= List of Columbia University honorary degree and commencement prize recipients =

Key
A.B.	Bachelor of Arts
A.M.	Master of Arts
D.D.	Doctor of Divinity
LH.D.	Doctor of Humane Letters
Litt.D.	Doctor of Letters
LL.B.	Bachelor of Laws
LL.D.	Doctor of Laws
M.D.	Doctor of Medicine
M.S.	Master of Science
Mus.D.	Doctor of Music
Sc.D.	Doctor of Science
S.T.D.	Doctor of Sacred Theology

This is a partial list of honorary degrees and commencement honors awarded by Columbia University in the City of New York.

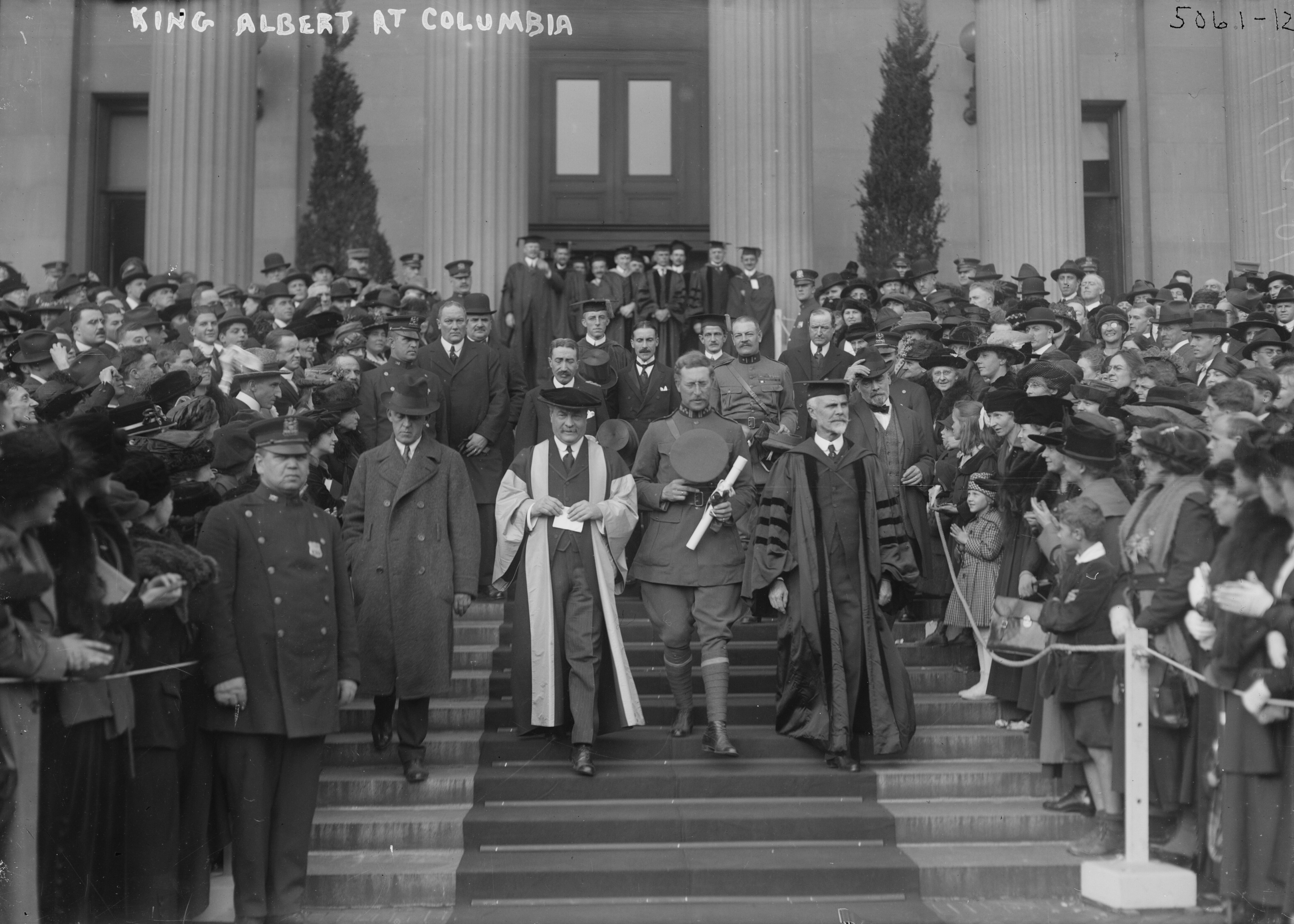
King Albert I of Belgium on the steps of Low Library after receiving an honorary degree, 1919

== 1700-1799 ==
=== 1750s ===
1758

Recipient	Degree or Honor
Daniel Isaac Brown	A.M.
Samuel Brown	A.M.
Isaac Browne	A.M.
Leonard Cutting	A.M.
Samuel Fayerweather	A.M.
Cary Ludlow	A.M.
David Mathews	A.M.
John McKesson	A.M.
Josiah Ogden	A.B.
Cyrus Punderson	A.M.
Ebenezer Punderson	A.M.
Daniel Treadwell	A.M.
Timothy Wetmore	A.M.

=== 1760s ===
1761

Recipient	Degree or Honor
John Beardsley	A.B.
William Jackson	A.M.
William Samuel Johnson	A.M.
Samuel Peters	A.M.
James Scovil	A.M.
Samuel Seabury	A.M.
Agur Treadwell	A.B.
Edward Winslow	A.M.

1762

Recipient	Degree or Honor
Samuel Andrews	A.M.
Robert Harpur	A.M.
Bela Hubbard	A.M.
Robert McKean	A.M.
Ebenezer Parmele	A.M.

1764

Recipient	Degree or Honor
Matthew Cushing	A.M.
Samuel Giles	A.B.

1765

Recipient	Degree or Honor
Jeremiah Leaming	A.M.

1767

Recipient	Degree or Honor
Samuel Auchmuty	D.D.
Ephram Avery	A.M.
Thomas Bradbury Chandler	D.D.
George Glentworth	A.M.
Charles Inglis	A.M.
Hugh Neill	A.M.
John Ogilvie	A.M.
John Tyler	A.B.

1768

Recipient	Degree or Honor
Samuel Bard	M.D.
John Beardsley	A.M.
Samuel Clossy	M.D.
Myles Cooper	LL.D.
John Jones	M.D.
Peter Middleton	M.D.

1769

Recipient	Degree or Honor
Ebenezer Kneeland	A.M.
John Tyler	A.M.

=== 1770s ===
1770

Recipient	Degree or Honor
Thomas Barton	A.M.
Robert Blackwell	A.B.
John Ogilvie	D.D.

1771

Recipient	Degree or Honor
Jonathan Boucher	A.M.

1772

Recipient	Degree or Honor
Edmund Fanning	A.M.

1773

Recipient	Degree or Honor
Isaac Hunt	A.M.
Joseph Lamson	A.M.
Harry Munro	A.M.
John Stuart	A.M.

1774

Recipient	Degree or Honor
Luke Babcock	A.M.
George Panton	A.M.
James Sayre	A.M.
William Tryon	LL.D.

=== 1780s ===
1787

Recipient	Degree or Honor
James Hardie	A.B.

1788

Recipient	Degree or Honor
Robert Annan	A.M.
William Cochran	A.M.
Alexander Hamilton	A.M.
Robert Charles Johnson	A.M.
Samuel Latham Mitchill	A.M.
Daniel Crommelin Verplanck	A.M.
James Watkin Watkins	A.M.

1789

Recipient	Degree or Honor
Roger Alden	A.M.
Abraham Beach	D.D.
John Daniel Gros	D.D.
Jacob Rusten Hardenbergh	D.D.
Samuel Evan Johnson	A.M.
Jeremiah Leaming	D.D.
William Linn	D.D.
Benjamin Moore	D.D.

=== 1790s ===
1790

Recipient	Degree or Honor
Joshua Bloomer	D.D.
James Hardie	A.M.
Henry Maeller	A.M.
Thomas Lambert Moore	A.M.
James Proudfit	A.M.

1793

Recipient	Honorary Degree
Ebenezer Dibble	D.D.
Andrew Jaffray	D.D.
William Ogivile	LL.D.

1794

Recipient	Honorary Degree
Richard Channing Moore	A.M.

1795

Recipient	Honorary Degree
John Campbell	A.M.
John Coffin	A.M.

1797

Recipient	Honorary Degree
John Bowden	D.D.
James Kent	LL.D.

1798

Recipient	Honorary Degree
William Best	A.M.
William Scott	A.M.
Andrew Smith	A.M.
Robert Griffeth Wetmore	A.M.

== 1800-1899 ==
=== 1800s ===
1802

Recipient	Honorary Degree
William Duke	A.M.
James Kemp	D.D.

1804

Recipient	Honorary Degree	Notes
Edmund D. Barry	A.M.	
Edward Jenkins	D.D.	
Jacob Larzelere	A.M.	Lecturer at l'Institut d'Etudes Politiques and l'Ecole Nationale d'Administration
Peter Stryker	A.M	

1805

Recipient	Honorary Degree
Clement Merriam	A.M

1806

Recipient	Honorary Degree
William James MacNeven	M.D.

1809

Recipient	Honorary Degree
Abraham Bronson	A.M.

=== 1810s ===
1811

Recipient	Honorary Degree
John Croes	D.D.
James Hall	D.D.
William Harris	D.D.
Isaac Wilkins	D.D.

1812

Recipient	Honorary Degree
Oliver Cromwell Comstock	M.D.
William Kirkpatrick	M.D.
Andrew Morton	M.D.
Alexandra Sheldon	M.D.
John Augustine Smith	M.D.
John Stearns	M.D.
David Baillie Warden	M.D.
Joseph White	M.D.
Westel Willoughby	M.D.

1814

Recipient	Honorary Degree
John Churchill Osborn	M.D.
Wright Post	M.D.

1815

Recipient	Honorary Degree
Frederick Beasley	D.D.

1816

Recipient	Honorary Degree
John Schureman	D.D.

1817

Recipient	Honorary Degree
John D. Jaques	M.D.

1818

Recipient	Honorary Degree
Robert Adrian	LL.D.
Joseph Hopkinson	LL.D.
Samuel Nichols	A.M.
Andrew Mitchell Thomson	D.D.

1819

Recipient	Honorary Degree
Thomas Church Brownell	D.D.
Philander Chase	D.D.
Richard Davidson	M.D.
John Philip	D.D.
William H Richardson	M.D.
John Van Cleve	M.D.

=== 1820s ===
1820

Recipient	Honorary Degree
Isaac Auld	M.D.
William Forrest	A.M.

1821

Recipient	Honorary Degree
Thaddeus Fiske	D.D.
Washington Irving	A.M.
Daniel McDonald	D.D.

1822

Recipient	Honorary Degree
William Lowndes	LL.D.
Thomas Lyell	D.D.
Pierre Proal	A.M.
John Reed	D.D.
Stephan N Rowan	D.D.
John Walsh	A.M.

1823

Recipient	Honorary Degree
John Carroll	A.M.
Abraham Oothout Halsey	A.M.
Chauncey Lee	D.D.
Edward Livingston	LL.D.
John Stark Ravenscroft	D.D.
Nathan Sanford	LL.D.
John Savage	LL.D.
Samuel Seabury	A.M.
Ambrose Spencer	LL.D.

1824

Recipient	Honorary Degree
Langdon Cheves	LL.D.
William A Clark	A.M.
James Fenimore Cooper	A.M.
Thomas Addis Emmet	LL.D.
Ernest Lewis Hazelius	D.D.
Levi Silliman Ives	A.M.
James Kirke Paulding	A.M.
Daniel Webster	LL.D.

1825

Recipient	Honorary Degree
John Caldwell Calhoun	LL.D.
Stephen Elliot	LL.D.
John McVickar	D.D.
Nathaniel Fish Moore	LL.D.
Henri L P F Peneveyre	D.D.
Joel Roberts Poinsett	LL.D.
William Shelton	A.M.

1826

Recipient	Honorary Degree
De Witt Clinton	LL.D.
Samuel Jones	LL.D.
Benjamin Tredwell Onderdonk	D.D.
William Wirt Phillips	D.D.
Peter Van Schaack	LL.D.

1827

Recipient	Honorary Degree
Jasper Adams	D.D.
Henry Ustick Onderdonk	D.D.
William Rollinson Whittingham	A.M

1828

Recipient	Honorary Degree
William Berrian	D.D.
Charles Taylor Catlin	A.M
Asa Eaton	D.D.
William Hendell	D.D.
William Buel Sprague	D.D.

1829

Recipient	Honorary Degree
Washington Irving	LL.D.
Jackson Kemper	D.D.
Clement Clarke Moore	LL.D.
James Renwick	LL.D.

=== 1830s ===
1830

Recipient	Honorary Degree
William Creighton	D.D.
James Marsh	D.D.
Frederic Christian Schaeffer	D.D.
William Davis Snodgrass	D.D.
William Muarry Stone	D.D.

1831

Recipient	Honorary Degree
Charles Anthon	LL.D.
Eli Baldwin	D.D.
Levi Silliman Ives	D.D.
Robert McCartee	D.D.
James Ryan	A.M.
James Shea	A.M.
Thomas Swords	A.B.
George Upfold	D.D.
Antoine Verren	A.B.

1832

Recipient	Honorary Degree
Henry Anthon	D.D.
Francis Lister Hawks	D.D.

1833

Recipient	Honorary Degree
Charles Burroughs	D.D.
George Washington Doane	D.D.
James Emott	LL.D.
James Hervey Otey	D.D.
John Hothersall Pinder	D.D.
David Prentice	A.M.
James M Quin	A.M.

1834

Recipient	Honorary Degree
Orange Clark	A.M.
Thomas Winthrop Coit	D.D.
Thomas Gener	LL.D.
Robert J Harvey	A.M.
William Augustus Muhlenburg	D.D.
William Sherwood	A.M.

1835

Recipient	Honorary Degree
Benjamin Clarke Cutler	D.D.
Manton Eastburn	D.D.
Manuel Fetter	D.D.
William Gaston	LL.D.
Peter Augustus Jay	LL.D.
James Neilson Reynolds	A.M.
Gulian Crommelin Verplanck	LL.D.
William Rollinson Williams	A.M.

1836

Recipient	Honorary Degree
Benjamin Hale	D.D.
Benjamin Luckock	A.M.
Jacob Sutherland	LL.D.
Henry Vethake	LL.D.

1837

Recipient	Honorary Degree
John Bethune	D.D.
William Cullen Bryant	A.M.
John Duer	LL.D.
George Griffin	LL.D.
Fitz-Greene Halleck	A.M.
Charles Fenno Hoffman	A.M.
Theodore Irving	A.M.
Erskine Mason	D.D.
Philip Frederick Mayer	D.D.
Samuel Allen McCoskry	D.D.
David Bayard Ogden	LL.D.
Samuel Seabury	D.D.
Thomas House Taylor	D.D.
Samuel Alexander Van Vranken	D.D.
Peter Dumont Vroom	LL.D.
William Rollinson Whittingham	D.D.
William R Williams	D.D.

1838

Recipient	Honorary Degree
Isaac Boyle	D.D.
Walter Chisolm	A.M.
Leonidas Polk	D.D.
James Romeyn	D.D.
Hugh Smith	D.D.

1839

Recipient	Honorary Degree
William Miller Carmichael	D.D.
Abraham Hasley	A.M.

=== 1840s ===
1840

Recipient	Honorary Degree
John Watson Adams	D.D.
Stephen Elliott	D.D.
Abraham Bruyn Hasbrouck	LL.D.
William Hawkesworth	A.M.
Hugh Swinton Legare	LL.D.
William Hickling Prescott	LL.D.

1841

Recipient	Honorary Degree
Albert Gallatin	LL.D.
E H Gotsbergen	A.M
C H Gottsberger	A.M.
Mancius Smedes Hutton	D.D.
Samuel Nelson	LL.D.
William M Thompson	A.M.

1842

Recipient	Honorary Degree
Gustavus Abeel	D.D.
James John Bowden	A.B.
Manuel Fetter	A.M.
Charles William Hackley	A.M.
Edward Y Higbee	A.M.
George C Schaeffer	A.M.
John H Shepherd	A.M.

1843

Recipient	Honorary Degree
John Mason Duncan	D.D.
George Emlen Hare	D.D.
Edward Y Higbee	D.D.
Daniel Stone	A.M.

1844

Recipient	Honorary Degree
Edward E Ford	D.D.
Joseph W Ingraham	A.M.
Ambrose Seymour Todd	D.D.
Charles Edwin West	A.M.

1845

Recipient	Honorary Degree
Daniel Dewey Barnard	LL.D.
Edward Cooper	A.M.
George H Fisher	D.D.
Charles Hewitt	A.M.
John Williamson McCullough	D.D.
Horatio Southgate	D.D.
Bird Wilson	LL.D.

1846

Recipient	Honorary Degree
William Bayard Blackwell	A.M.
Robert Emory	D.D.
Benjamin Isaacs Haight	D.D.
Ezra Abel Huntington	D.D.

1847

Recipient	Honorary Degree
John Murray Forbes	D.D.
William Ingraham Kip	D.D.
Joseph Henry Price	D.D.
John Canfield Spencer	LL.D.

1848

Recipient	Honorary Degree
Samuel Roosevelt Johnson	D.D.
Francis Vinton	D.D.

1849

Recipient	Honorary Degree
George Alexander Crook	A.M.
Robert William Harris	D.D.
James Stephenson	A.M.
Horace Webster	LL.D.

=== 1850s ===
1850

Recipient	Honorary Degree
Henry James Anderson	LL.D.
William Betts	LL.D.
William Drisler	A.M.
Hamilton Fish	LL.D.
David X Junkin	D.D.
John Barrett Kerfoot	D.D.
Kendrick Metcalf	D.D.
Winfield Scott	LL.D.
Timothy D Williams	D.D.

1851

Recipient	Honorary Degree
Francis Higgins Cuming	D.D.
Martin Phillips Parks	D.D.
Robert George Vermilye	D.D.
John Williams	D.D.
Octavius Winslow	D.D.

1852

Recipient	Honorary Degree
Stephen Alexander	LL.D.
Samuel Gilman Brown	D.D.
William Buel Franklin	A.M.
Richard Pulling Jenks	A.M.
William McMurray	D.D.
John Rowland	A.M.
Jesse Ames Spencer	D.D.
William Walton	D.D.
John Lee Watson	D.D.

1853

Recipient	Honorary Degree
Talbot Wilson Chambers	D.D.
Thomas Frederick Davis	D.D.
Henry D. Erskine	D.D.
Isaac Ferris	LL.D.
Charles Todd Quintard	A.M.
Charles Rogers	LL.D.
Samuel Spratt Strong	D.D.

1854

Recipient	Honorary Degree
William Robert Gordon	D.D.
Jean Romer	A.M.
J Jackson Scott	D.D.
Henry Philip Tappan	LL.D.

1855

Recipient	Honorary Degree
Joseph Howland Coit	D.D.
William Ernest Eigenbrodt	D.D.
Joseph Fewsmith	D.D.
John Magoffin Macauley	D.D.
Russel Trevett	D.D.

1856

Recipient	Honorary Degree
John Blakeley	D.D.
John Henry Hobart	D.D.
A. S. Osborne	A.M
George Sharswood	LL.D.
R S Smith	A.M.
Alfred Stubbs	D.D.

1857

Recipient	Honorary Degree
Joseph Alden	LL.D.
Alfred Baury Beach	D.D.
Samuel Cooke	D.D.
William Cecil Duncan	D.D.
Francis Maerschalk Kip	D.D.
William Ferdinand Morgan	D.D.

1858

Recipient	Honorary Degree
Charles D'Urban Morris	A.M.
Samuel Spring	D.D.
John Ireland Tucker	D.D.
Isaac Dyckman Vermilye	A.M.
Henry Waterman	S.T.D.

1859

Recipient	Honorary Degree
Thomas De Boice Coryell	A.M.
William Armstrong Dod	D.D.
William Mitchell Gillespie	LL.D.
George H Houghton	D.D.
Lot Jones	D.D.
Alexander S Leonard	D.D.
Alexander Gardiner Mercer	S.T.D.
Samuel Tyler	LL.D.

=== 1860s ===
1860

Recipient	Honorary Degree
Charles Patrick Daly	LL.D.
Theodore William Dwight	LL.D.
John Wakefield Francis	LL.D.
John William French	D.D.
Thomas Tompkins Guion	D.D.
David Murray Hoffman	LL.D.
Fordyce Mitchell Hubbard	D.D.
Daniel Phoenix Ingraham	LL.D.
Matthew Hall McAllister	LL.D.
Charles Stuart Tripler	A.M.
Lewis Bartholomew Woodruff	LL.D.

1861

Recipient	Honorary Degree	Notes
John Anthon	LL.D.	
Charles Bancroft	D.D.	
Alexander Warfield Bradford	LL.D.	
Charles Henry Hall	D.D.	
James Hall Mason Knox	D.D.	
Abraham Lincoln	LL.D.	Awarded in Washington, D.C.
Edward Nathaniel Mead	D.D.	
Joseph Clarkson Passmore	S.T.D.	
Sullivan Hardy Weston	S.T.D.	

1862

Recipient	Honorary Degree
Samuel Buel	S.T.D.
George Jarvis Geer	S.T.D.
Benjamin Nicholas Martin	S.T.D.
Henry Joel Scudder	A.M.
John Cotton Smith	S.T.D.

1863

Recipient	Honorary Degree
Samuel Hanson Coxe	S.T.D.
Morgan Dix	D.D.
Samuel Eliot	LL.D.
Jared Bradley Flagg	ST.D.
James Watson Gerard	LL.D.
Robert Shaw Howland	D.D.
Matson Meier-Smith	D.D.
William Mitchell	LL.D.
Gilbert Hunt Sayres	D.D.
James A Williams	D.D.

1864

Recipient	Honorary Degree
Henry Stephens Cutler	Mus.D.
Henry Drisler	LL.D.
Joseph G Fox	A.M.
Thomas Hunter	A.M.

1865

Recipient	Honorary Degree
Samuel Rose Ely	D.D.
John Marshall Guion	D.D.
Andrew Johnson	LL.D.
McWalter Bernard Noyes	A.M.
James Tuttle-Smith	A.M.
William Henry Walter	Mus.D.
George D Waters	D.D.
Henry John Whitehouse	LL.D.
John Freeman Young	S.T.D.

1866

Recipient	Honorary Degree
William Edmond Armitage	D.D.
John Jay Elmendorf	D.D.
Abner Jackson	LL.D.
Charles Pinckney Kirkland	LL.D.
James Mulcahey	S.T.D.
Charles Todd Quintard	D.D.

1867

Recipient	Honorary Degree
Samuel Blatchford	LL.D.
Samuel Breck Bostwick	D.D.
Frederic De Peyster	LL.D.
Ferdinand Cartwright Ewer	D.D.
Anthony Ten Broeck	D.D.
Daniel Sylvester Tuttle	D.D.
Channing M Williams	D.D.

1868

Recipient	Honorary Degree
Philander Kinney Cady	S.T.D.
George Barnard Draper	D.D.
John Henry Hill	LL.D.
Samuel Hollingsworth	D.D.
Charles Franklin Robertson	S.T.D.

1869

Recipient	Honorary Degree
Charles Breck	D.D.
Henry Ammi Dows	A.M.
Theodore Augustus Eaton	D.D.
Asa Bird Gardiner	A.M.
Thomas William Humes	D.D.
William Quintard Ketchum	D.D.
Benson John Lossing	A.M.
John Carpenter Smith	D.D.

=== 1870s ===
1870

Recipient	Honorary Degree
Samuel Brazer Babcock	S.T.D.
Peter Hasbrouck	A.M.
William Augustus McVickar	D.D.
Henry Nicoll	LL.D.

1871

Recipient	Honorary Degree
Edmund Alexander De Schweintiz	S.T.D.
John Habersham Elliott	S.T.D.
James Isbell Helm	D.D.
Pelham Williams	S.T.D.

1872

Recipient	Honorary Degree
John Graeff Barton	LL.D.
James Starr Clark	D.D.
Howard Crosby	LL.D.
Edward David Hearn	A.M.
William Bell White Howe	S.T.D.
Charles O'Conor	LL.D.
Isaac Lewis Peet	LL.D.
Eliphalet Nott Potter	S.T.D.
Nathan Ryno Smith	M.D.

1873

Recipient	Honorary Degree
John Gottlieb Auer	S.T.D.
William Henry Chandler	A.M.
[Oliver] Wolcott Gibbs	LL.D.
Henry Augustus Homes	LL.D.
William Reed Huntington	S.T.D.
Benjamin Douglas Silliman	LL.D.
James Stephenson	D.D.

1874

Recipient	Honorary Degree
Eben Edwards Beardsley	LL.D.
Joseph Hart Clinch	S.T.D.
Jacob Cooper	S.T.D.
Robert N Merritt	D.D.
Clarkson Nott Potter	LL.D.

1875

Recipient	Honorary Degree
William Spencer Child	D.D.
William Kirtland Douglas	S.T.D.
William Porcher Du Bose	S.T.D.
John Nicholas Galleher	D.D.
James Lenox	LL.D.
William Channing Russel	LL.D.
Thomas Edward Vermilye	LL.D.

1876

Recipient	Honorary Degree
William Whittingham Olssen	D.D.
Julius Hawley Seelye	LL.D.

1877

Recipient	Honorary Degree
Charles Coffin Adams	D.D.
Joseph Lemuel Chester	LL.D.
Thomas Ruggles Pynchon	LL.D.
Alonzo Groesbeck Shears	A.M.
James Craig Watson	LL.D.

1878

Recipient	Honorary Degree
Fordyce Barker	LL.D.
David Greene Haskins	S.T.D.
Edward Singleton Holden	LL.D.
George Franklin Seymour	LL.D.
Edmond Hamilton Smith	LL.B.

=== 1880s ===
1880

Recipient	Honorary Degree
Leopold Damrosch	Mus.D.
Louis Palma di Cesnola	LL.D.

1883

Recipient	Honorary Degree

1884

Recipient	Honorary Degree
William David Walker	S.T.D.
Charles Walston	A.M.

1885

Recipient	Honorary Degree
James Hall Mason Knox	LL.D.
Emory McClintock	LL.D.

1886

Recipient	Honorary Degree
John Hall	LL.D.

1887

Recipient	Honorary Degree
Martin Bower Anderson	LH.D.
Charles Andrews	LH.D.
James Burrill Angell	LL.D.
George Bancroft	LL.D.
Henry Barnard	LH.D.
Phillips Brooks	S.T.D.
Ephenor Adrastus Brown	A.M.
Francis James Child	LH.D.
Henry Augustus Coit	ST.D.
Frederic R. Coudert	LL.D.
George William Curtis	LH.D.
John Call Dalton	LL.D.
John Chandler Bancroft Davis	LL.D.
Nathaniel Henry Rhodes Dawson	LH.D.
Sir John William Dawson	LL.D.
John De Witt	LH.D.
Robert Earl	LL.D.
Amelia Blandford Edwards	LH.D.
Robert Brinkerhoff Fairbairn	S.T.D.
Sandford Fleming	LL.D.
Horace Howard Furness	LH.D.
Merrill Edwards Gates	LH.D.
Daniel Coit Gilman	LL.D.
William W Goodwin	LL.D.
Benjamin Apthorp Gould	LL.D.
Albert Zabriskie Gray	S.T.D.
Isaac Hollister Hall	LH.D.
James A Harrison	LH.D.
Abram Stevens Hewitt	LL.D.
Eugene W Hilgard	LL.D.
Eugene Augustus Hoffman	S.T.D.
Frederic Dan Huntington	S.T.D.
Lord William Thompson Kelvin	LL.D.
John Richard Magrath	S.T.D.
Daniel Manning	LL.D.
Francis Andrew March	LH.D.
John Barbee Minor	LL.D.
Maria Mitchell	LL.D.
Simon Newcomb	LL.D.
Mrs. G H Palmer	LH.D.
Charles Anthony Rapallo	LL.D.
William Crawford Ruger	LL.D.
Lewis Morris Rutherford	LL.D.
Julius Hawley Seelye	LL.D.
William Milligan Sloane	LH.D
George Williamson Smith	S.T.D.
Carlo Leonardo Speranza	A.M.
Moritz Steinschneider	LH.D.
Richard Salter Storrs	LH.D.
George Lansing Taylor	LH.D.
James Hammond Trumbell	LH.D.
Moses Coit Tyler	LH.D.
John Tyndall	LL.D.
Herman Ludwig Ferdinand von Helmholtz	LL.D.
Morrison Remick Waite	LL.D.
Francis Amasa Walker	LL.D.
Sir Charles Walston	LH.D.
Andrew Dickson White	LH.D.
William Dwight Whitney	LH.D.
William Copley Winslow	LH.D.
Charles Augustus Young	LL.D.

1888

Recipient	Honorary Degree
Victor Morawetz	A.M.
Charles Eliot Norton	LH.D.

1889

Recipient	Honorary Degree
Stephen P Nash	LL.D.

=== 1890s ===
1890

Recipient	Honorary Degree	Notes
W H Clifford Bartlett	LL.D.	Class of 1826, U.S. Military Academy. Long time faculty member at West Point.
Samuel Bowden	D.D.	Columbia College Class 1840; Pastor of the Reformed Presbyterian Church of York, Livingston County, N. Y., 1846–1876.
James Watson Gerard	LL.D.	Class of 1843, Columbia College.
John Howard Van Amringe	LH.D.	Class 1860, Columbia College; Professor at Columbia College

1891

Recipient	Honorary Degree	Notes
Thomas Frank Gailor	ST.D.	Vice Chancellor of the University of the South
Merrill Edwards Gates	LL.D.	President of Amherst College
Ezra Palmer Gould	ST.D.	Professor of Biblical Criticism at the Philadelphia Divinity School
John Jay	LL.D.	Columbia College, Class of 1836.

1892

Recipient	Honorary Degree	Notes
Edgar M Cullen	LL.D.	Justice of the Supreme Court of New York State, Second Judicial District
Henry Lawrence Jones	ST.D.	Rector of St. Stephen's Church, Wilkes-Barre, Pennsylvania
Fessendon Nott Otis	LL.D.	Medical doctor; professor at College of Physicians and Surgeons
Jacob Gould Schurman	LL.D.	President of Cornell University
Edmund Clarence Stedman	LH.D.	American poet, critic, and essayist

1893

Recipient	Honorary Degree	Notes
Ira Remsen	LL.D.	Professor at Johns Hopkins University

1894

Recipient	Honorary Degree	Notes
Landon Carter Gray	A.M.	Medical doctor, specializing in neurology
George William Hill	LL.D.	Mathematician
John Hone	A.B.	
Emile Henry Lacombe	LL.D.	Jurist; Judge of the United States Circuit Court for the Second Circuit
Nikola Tesla	LL.D.	Electrician

1895

Recipient	Honorary Degree	Notes
Thomas Messinger Drown	LL.D.	President-elect of Lehigh University

1896

Recipient	Honorary Degree	Notes
Samuel Putnam Avery	A.M.	American artist, art dealer and philanthropist
Charles Carter Harrison	LL.D.	Provost of the University of Pennsylvania

1897

Recipient	Honorary Degree	Notes
Samuel Andrew Law	A.M.	
Henry Yates Satterlee	LL.D.	Bishop of Washington

1898

Recipient	Honorary Degree	Notes
Alphonse Fteley	A.M.	Chief engineer N.Y. Acqueduct
George Frederick Kunz	A.M.	American mineralogist
William Nielson McVickar	S.T.D.	Coadjutor Bishop of Rhode Island
John Fritz	A.M.	General Superintendent and Chief Engineer of the Bethlehem Iron Works; Trustee of Lehigh University

1899

Recipient	Honorary Degree	Notes
George W Melville	M.S.	Engineer-in-Chief, United States Navy
Theodore Roosevelt	LL.D.	Governor of New York State
Carl Schurz	LL.D.	Politician, author and publicist
John Aikman Stewart	A.M.	Wall Street banker and financier
Edward Livingston Trudeau	M.S.	Medical doctor

== 1900-1999 ==
=== 1900s ===
1900

Recipient	Degree or Honor	Notes
Arthur Twining Hadley	LL.D.	President of Yale University
Abraham Jacobi	LL.D.	Professor of the Diseases of Children at the College of Physicians and Surgeons, Columbia University
Morris Ketchum Jesup	A.M.	U.S. banker and philanthropist
Alfred Thayer Mahan	LL.D.	Captain, United States Navy
Henry William Maxwell	A.M.	Banker, broker, educator, financier, and philanthropist
Julian Pauncefote	LL.B.	Lord of Preston; Ambassador
Charles Alfred Post	A.M.	Lawyer and astronomer
Thomas Brackett Reed	LL.D.	Statesman; Speaker of the House
Minton Warren	LL.D.	Professor of Latin at Harvard University

1901

Recipient	Degree or Honor	Notes
Theodore Low De Vinne	A.M.	American printer and scholarly author on typography.
Frank Dunlap Gamewell	M.S.	Educator and missionary
Arnold Hague	Sc.D.	Geologist
George Morewood Lefferts	M.S.	Medical doctor; Clinical Professor of Laryngology and Rhinology at the College of Physicians and Surgeons
William Henry Maxwell	LL.D.	Superintendent of the New York City Public Schools
Rufus William Peckham	LL.D.	Associate Justice of the Supreme Court of the United States

1902

Recipient	Degree or Honor	Notes
Samuel Benedict Christy	Sc.D.	Professor of Mining and Metallurgy at the University of California
Marie-Joseph Alfred Croiset	LL.D.	Dean of the Faculty of Letters at the University of Paris
Edward Washburn Hopkins	LL.D.	Professor of Sanskrit and Comparative Philology at Yale University
Michael Ernest Sadler	LL.D.	Director of Special Inquiries and Reports, Education Office, London
Right Reverend John Lancaster Spalding	LL.D.	Bishop of Peoria

1903

Recipient	Degree or Honor	Notes
Andrew Sloan Draper	LL.D.	President of the University of Illinois. Degree awarded in camera
John Britton Cauldwell	A.M.	Engineer
George Angier Gordon	S.T.D.	Minister of Old South Church, Boston
Peter Cooper Hewitt	Sc.D.	Scientist; Inventor
Alexander Crombie Humphreys	LL.D.	President of Stevens Institute of Technology
Jules Jusserand	LL.D.	Ambassador of France
Benjamin Barker Odell	LL.D.	Governor of New York State
Moses Taylor Pyne	Litt.D.	Trustee of Princeton University
Joseph John Thomson	Sc.D.	Cavendish Professor of Experimental Physics at the University of Cambridge

1904

Recipient	Degree or Honor	Notes
Alfred Conkling Coxe	LL.D.	Judge of the Circuit Court of the United States
Hugo De Vries	Sc.D.	Professor of Botany at the University of Amsterdam
Right Reverend David Hummell Greer	S.T.D.	Coadjutor Bishop of New York
Charles Follen McKim	Litt.D.	Architect
Howard Jason Rogers	A.M.	Assistant Commissioner of Education of New York State
Elihu Root	LL.D.	Formerly Secretary of War of the United States
Right Honorable James Bryce	LL.D.	Statesman. Degree awarded in camera
William Henry Nicholls	Sc.D.	Chemist. Degree awarded in camera
Sir William Ramsay	Sc.D.	Chemist. Degree awarded in camera
Willard Bartlett	LL.D.	Justice of the Supreme Court of New York State, Appellate Division, Second Department
Nathaniel Lord Britton	Sc.D.	Emeritus Professor of Botany at Columbia University, Director of the New York Botanical Garden
LeBaron Bradford Colt	LL.D.	Judge of the United States Circuit Court, First Judicial District
John Green Curtis	LL.D.	Professor of Physiology at Columbia University
Robert Fulton Cutting	LL.D.	Philanthropist; Leader and Organizer of Movements for Social and Political Betterment
Francis Delafield	LL.D.	Professor of the Practice of Medicine at the College of Physicians and Surgeons, Columbia University
William Archibald Dunning	LL.D.	Professor of History and Political Philosophy at Columbia University
James Willis Gleed	LL.D.	Professor of the Law of Real Property at the University of Kansas
Frank Johnson Goodnow	LL.D.	Professor of Administrative Law and Municipal Science at Columbia University
William Stewart Halsted	Sc.D.	Professor of Surgery at Johns Hopkins University; Surgeon-In-Chief at the Johns Hopkins Hospital
Luther Emmett Holt	Sc.D.	Carpentier Professor of Pediatrics at Columbia University; Attending Physician at Babies' and New York Foundling Hospitals
George Sumner Huntington	Sc.D.	Professor of Anatomy at Columbia University
George Landon Ingraham	LL.D.	Justice of the Supreme Court of New York State, Appellate Division, First Department
Abraham Valentine Williams Jackson	LL.D.	Professor of Indo-Iranian Languages at Columbia University
Walter Belknap James	LL.D.	Professor of the Practice of Medicine at Columbia University; Visiting Physician at Roosevelt and Presbyterian Hospitals
Edward Gamaliel Janeway	LL.D.	Dean of the University-and-Bellevue Hospital Medical College
Karl Gotthart Lamprecht	LL.D.	University Professor. Degree awarded in camera.
Joseph Larocque	LL.D.	Formerly President of the Bar Association of New York City
Ernst Joseph Lederle	Sc.D.	Former Commission of Health of New York City
Brander Matthews	LL.D.	Professor of Dramatic Literature at Columbia University
Andrew James McCosh	LL.D.	Visiting Surgeon at the Presbyterian Hospital
Henry Smith Munroe	Sc.D.	Professor of Mining at Columbia University
Morgan Joseph O'Brien	LL.D.	Justice of the Supreme Court of New York State, Appellate Division, First Department
Harry Thurston Peck	LL.D.	Professor of the Latin Language and Literature at Columbia University
Edward Delavan Perry	LL.D.	Jay Professor of Greek at Columbia University; Dean of the Faculty of Philosophy
William Mecklenberg Polk	LL.D.	Dean of the Cornell University Medical College
William Bleecker Potter	Sc.D.	Mining and Metallurgical Engineer
Michael Idvorsky Pupin	Sc.D.	Professor of Electro-Mechanics at Columbia University
Edwin Robert Anderson Seligman	LL.D.	Professor of Political Economy and Finance at Columbia University; Past President of the American Economic Association
Munroe Smith	LL.D.	Professor of Roman Law and Comparative Jurisprudence at Columbia University
Moses Allen Starr	Sc.D.	Professor of Neurology at Columbia University; Consulting Physician at the Presbyterian Hospital
Oscar Soloman Straus	LL.D.	Author, Diplomat, and Publicist; Formerly Minister of the United States to Turkey
William Henry Welch	LL.D.	Professor of Pathology at the Johns Hopkins University
Right Honorable and Most Reverend Randall Thomas Davidson	LL.D.	Archbishop of Canterbury. Degree awarded in camera.

1905

Recipient	Degree or Honor	Notes
William Tufts Brigham	Sc.D.	Director of the Bishop Museum of Ethnology, Honolulu
Jacob McGavock Dickinson	LL.D.	Lawyer
Frederick Arthur Goetze	M.S.	Superintendent of Buildings and Grounds at Columbia University
William Dean Howells	Litt.D.	Man of Letters
Reverend William Thomas Manning	S.T.D.	Assistant Rector of Trinity Church, New York
George Francis Sever	M.S.	Professor of Electrical Engineering at Columbia University
Robert Simpson Woodward	Sc.D.	Professor of Mechanics and Mathematical Physics at Columbia University; President of the Carnegie Institute of Washington
Edwin Anderson Alderman	LL.D.	President of the University of Virginia. Degree awarded in camera
Baron Jutaro Komura	LL.D.	Japanese Minister of Foreign Affairs. Awarded at the opening exercises. Awarded jointly with Sergey Yulievitch Witte. Conferred in absentia. Consul General Uchida received the diploma on behalf of Komura.
Sergey Yulievitch Witte	LL.D.	Russian Secretary of State and President of the Committee of Ministers. Awarded at the opening exercises. Awarded jointly with Baron Jutaro Komura. Conferred in absentia. Consul General Lodygensky received the diploma on behalf of Witte.

1906

Recipient	Degree or Honor	Notes
Daniel Giraud Elliot	Sc.D.	Curator of Zoology, Field Columbian Museum, Chicago
Joaquim Nabuco	LL.D.	Ambassador of Brazil to the United States
Edward Patterson	LL.D.	Justice of the Supreme Court of New York State
Kanehiro Takaki	Sc.D.	Surgeon General (reserve) of the Japanese Navy
William Greenough Thayer	A.M.	Headmaster of St. Mark's School, Southboro, Massachusetts
William Jewett Tucker	LL.D.	President of Dartmouth College
Benjamin Ide Wheeler	LL.D.	President of the University of California
William Henry Perkin	Sc.D.	Scientist. Degree awarded in camera

1907

Recipient	Degree or Honor	Notes
James Fitzmaurice-Kelly	Litt.D.	Author; Editor. Degree awarded in camera
Archer Milton Huntington	Litt.D.	Author. Degree awarded in camera
Hugh McCulloh Birckhead	A.M.	Rector of St. George's Church
Elmer Ellsworth Brown	LL.D.	United States Commissioner of Education
John Aaron Browning	A.M.	Headmaster of the Browning School
Charles Gordon Curtis, C.E.	M.S.	Inventor
Wilson Farrand	A.M.	Headmaster of the Newark Academy
Richard Watson Gilder	Litt.D.	Editor
Charles Evans Hughes	LL.D.	Governor of New York State
Henry Fairfield Osborn	LL.D.	Da Costa Professor of Zoology

1908

Recipient	Degree or Honor	Notes
K.G. Rudolf Leonard	LL.D.	Jurist; Publicist, Educator, and Ambassador of Learning; Kaiser William Professor 1907–1908. Degree awarded in camera
Lea Luquer	S.T.D.	Rector of St. Matthew's Church, Bedford, New York
Charles Freeman Williams McClure	Sc.D.	Professor of Zoology at Princeton University
George Browne Post	LL.D.	Architect
Hermann Shumacher	LL.D.	Professor of Economics at the University of Bonn
Frederick William Stevens	LL.D.	Vice-Chancellor of New Jersey
Jonathan Mayhew Wainwright	A.M.	Member of the Assembly, 1902–1908
Henry Clay White	LL.D.	President of Georgria State Agricultural and Mechanical College

1909

Recipient	Degree or Honor	Notes
Guglielmo Ferrero	Litt.D.	Historian. Degree Awarded in camera
Albrecht F. K. Penck	Sc.D.	Privy Councillor and Director of the Geographical Institute of the University of Berlin; Kaiser Wilhelm Professor 1908–1909. Degree Awarded in camera
Silas Brown Brownell	LL.D.	Chairman of the Trustees at Barnard College
Mary Whiton Calkins	Litt.D.	Professor of Philosophy and Psychology at Wellesley College
John Halliday Denbigh	A.M.	Principal of the Morris High School, New York City
Samuel Franklin Emmons	Sc.D.	Geologist
Christian K. F. Hulsen	Litt.D.	Archaeologist
Henry Churchill King	S.T.D.	President of Oberlin College
Benjamin Bowden Lawrence	M.S.	Engineer
Abbott Lawrence Lowell	LL.D.	President of Harvard University
Alfred Mosely, C.M.G.	LL.D.	Man of Affairs
John Coit Spooner	LL.D.	United States Senator from Wisconsin
Johann Heinrich von Bernstorff	LL.D.	German Ambassador to the United States

=== 1910s ===
1910

Recipient	Degree or Honor	Notes
Emile Boutroux	Litt.D.	Director of the Foundation of Theirs; Professor of History and Philosophy at the Sorbonne; President of the Academie des Sciences Morales et Politiques. Degree Awarded in camera
Otto Jespersen	Litt.D.	Professor of English Philology at the University of Copenhagen; Visiting Danish Professor at Columbia University 1909–1910. Degree awarded in camera
Carl Runge	Sc.D.	Professor of Applied Mathematics at the University of Göttingen; Kaiser Wilhelm Professor at Columbia University 1909–1910. Degree awarded in camera
Roelif Hasbrouk Brooks	A.M.	Rector of St. Paul's Church, Albany, New York
William Crary Brownell	Litt.D.	Author
William Newton Clarke	S.T.D.	Professor of Theology at Colgate University
Henry Steele Demarest	LL.D.	President of Rutgers College
Charles Buxton Going	M.S.	Engineer
William James Mayo	Sc.D.	Surgeon
John Howard Van Amringe	LL.D.	Dean of Columbia College
Mrs. Schuyler Van Rensselaer	Litt.D.	Author
William Allen White	A.M.	Author
Sir William Henry White, K.C.B.	Sc.D.	Formerly Director of Construction of the British Navy; Associated in Designing the "Mauretania" and "Lusitania"

1911

Recipient	Degree or Honor	Notes
Gustave Lanson	Litt.D.	Professor of French Literature at the University of Paris, Visiting French Professor 1911- 1912. Degree Awarded in camera
Josef Schick	Litt.D.	Professor of English Philosophy at the Ludwig-Maximilians-Universität München; Kaiser Wilhelm Professor 1911–1912. Degree Awarded in camera.
Ernst Daenell	Litt.D.	Professor of Modern History at Kiel University. Degree Awarded in camera.
Simeon Eben Baldwin	LL.D.	Governor of Connecticut
Charles Sumner Burch	S.T.D.	Bishop Suffragan of the Diocese of New York
Charles Frederick Chandler	LL.D.	Mitchell Professor of Chemistry at Columbia University
Paul D'Estournelles de Constant	LL.D.	Senator of France
Samuel William Fairchild	M.S.	Chemist
Alonzo Barton Hepburn	LL.D.	President of the Chamber of Commerce of New York State
William Lawrence	S.T.D.	Bishop of Massachusetts
Daniel Edward Moran	M.S.	Engineer
Hugo Reisinger	A.M.	Art Collector; Merchant
Edward Robinson	Litt.D.	Director of the Metropolitan Museum of Art
Charles Francis Stokes	Sc.D.	Surgeon General of the United States Navy

1912

Recipient	Degree or Honor	Notes
John William Burgess	LL.D.	Ruggles Professor of Political Science and Constitutional Law; Dean of Faculties of Political Science, Philosophy, Pure Science, and the Fine Arts
George Washington Goethals	Sc.D.	Colonel of Engineers, United States Army; Chief Engineer of the Panama Canal
John Grier Hibben	Litt.D.	President of Princeton University
George Haven Putnam	Litt.D.	Publisher
Philip Mercer Rhinelander	S.T.D.	Bishop of Pennsylvania
Oscar Wilder Underwood	LL.D.	Representative from the State of Alabama; Chairman of the Committee on Ways and Means in the Sixty-Second Congress
Schuyler Skaats Wheeler	M.S.	Engineer
Edward D White	LL.D.	Chief Justice of the United States
Luis Maria Drago	LL.D.	Formerly Minister of Foreign Affairs of the Argentine Republic; Member of the Permanent Court of Arbitration at the Hague. Was not conferred at 1912 June 5 commencement due to illness. Was then supposed to be awarded in October 1912, but apparently never was.

1913

Recipient	Degree or Honor	Notes
Jean Perrin	Sc.D.	Professor of Physical Chemistry at the University of Paris; Visiting French Professor, 1913–1914. Degree awarded in camera
Karl F Th Rathgen	Litt.D.	Professor of Political Economy at the Colonial Institute, Hamburg; Kaiser Wilhelm Professor 1913–1914. Degree awarded in camera
Josef Schumpeter	Litt.D.	Professor of Political Economy at the University of Graz; Visiting Austrian Professor 1913–1914. Degree awarded in camera
Henri Bergson	LL.D.	Membre de L'Insitut; Professor of Philosophy at the College de France, Visiting French Professor 1912–1913. Degree Awarded in camera
Felix Krueger	Litt.D.	Professor of Psychology at the University of Halle; Kaiser Wilhelm Professor 1912–1913
Samuel Parkes Cadman	S.T.D.	Pastor of the Central Congregational Church, Brooklyn
Alexis Carrel	Sc.D.	Surgeon
Daniel C French	Litt.D.	Sculptor
William C Gorgas	Sc.D.	Assistant Surgeon-General, United States Army
Henry Sydnor Harrison	A.M.	Author
William Rhinelander Stewart	A.M.	Humanitarian
George Sutherland	Litt.D.	United States Senator from Utah
Barrett Wendell	Litt.D.	Professor of English at Harvard University
Rudolf Eucken	Litt.D.	Professor of Philosophy at the University of Jena

1914

Recipient	Degree or Honor	Notes
Albert Geouffre De Lapradelle	LL.D.	Professor of International Public Law at the University of Paris; Visiting French Professor 1914–1915. Degree Awarded in camera
Aristides Agramonte	Sc.D.	Professor of Bacteriology and Experimental Pathology at the University of Cuba
Edward Livermore Burlingame	Litt.D.	Editor
Walter Johannes Damrosch	LL.D.	Conductor of the New York Symphony Society
John Huston Finley	LL.D.	Commissioner of Education of New York State
William Montague Geer	ST.D.	Clergyman
Seth Low	LL.D.	Eleventh President, 1890–1901; Trustee, 1881–1914
William Williams	A.M.	Commissioner of Immigration at the Port of New York; Commissioner of Water Supply, Gas, and Electricity
John Parke Channing	M.S.	Engineer. (Degree awarded at the Special Convocation in Celebration of the 50th Anniversary of the Founding of the School of Mines)
John Adams Church	M.S.	Engineer. (Degree awarded at the Special Convocation in Celebration of the 50th Anniversary of the Founding of the School of Mines)
Frances Bacon Crooker	Mus.D.	Engineer. (Degree awarded at the Special Convocation in Celebration of the 50th Anniversary of the Founding of the School of Mines)
Frederick Warner Denton	M.S.	Engineer. (Degree awarded at the Special Convocation in Celebration of the 50th Anniversary of the Founding of the School of Mines)
Gano Dunn	M.S.	Engineer. (Degree awarded at the Special Convocation in Celebration of the 50th Anniversary of the Founding of the School of Mines)
Arthur Smith Dwight	M.S.	Engineer. (Degree awarded at the Special Convocation in Celebration of the 50th Anniversary of the Founding of the School of Mines)
Karl Eilers	M.S.	Engineer. (Degree awarded at the Special Convocation in Celebration of the 50th Anniversary of the Founding of the School of Mines)
Arthur Henry Elliot	M.S.	Engineer. (Degree awarded at the Special Convocation in Celebration of the 50th Anniversary of the Founding of the School of Mines)
Henry Fred Hornbostel	A.M.	Engineer. (Degree awarded at the Special Convocation in Celebration of the 50th Anniversary of the Founding of the School of Mines)
Wheaton Bradish Kunhardt	M.S.	Engineer. (Degree awarded at the Special Convocation in Celebration of the 50th Anniversary of the Founding of the School of Mines)
Goodhue Livingston	A.M.	Engineer. (Degree awarded at the Special Convocation in Celebration of the 50th Anniversary of the Founding of the School of Mines)
Carl August Meissner	M.S.	Engineer. (Degree awarded at the Special Convocation in Celebration of the 50th Anniversary of the Founding of the School of Mines)
Rudolph Philip Miller	M.S.	Engineer. (Degree awarded at the Special Convocation in Celebration of the 50th Anniversary of the Founding of the School of Mines)
Robert Van Arsdale Norris	M.S.	Engineer. (Degree awarded at the Special Convocation in Celebration of the 50th Anniversary of the Founding of the School of Mines)

1915

Recipient	Degree or Honor	Notes
Benjamin Nathan Cardozo	LL.D.	Associate Judge of the Court of Appeals of New York State
Arthur Louis Day	Sc.D.	Director of the Geophyiscal Laboratory, Carnagie Institution, Washington
Sir Johnston Forbes-Robertson	A.M.	Actor
Robert Stanislaus Griffin	Sc.D.	Rear Admiral and Engineer-in-Chief, United States Navy
Myron Timothy Herrick	LL.D.	Former Ambassador to France
Charles Ransom Miller	Litt.D.	Editor-In-Chief of the New York Times
Reverend Ralph Brouwer Pomeroy	A.M.	Rector of Trinity Church, Princeton; Lecturer on Religion at Princeton University
Louisa Lee Schuyler	LL.D.	Philanthropist
Hugh Lenox Scott	LL.D.	Major General and Chief of Staff, United States Army

1916

Recipient	Degree or Honor	Notes
Edwin Hatfield Anderson	A.M.	Director of the New York Public Library
Edwin Howland Blashfield	Litt.D.	President of the National Institute of Arts and Letters
Joseph Hodges Choate	LL.D.	Former Ambassador to Great Britain
George Frederick Clover	A.M.	Superintendent of St. Luke's Hospital
Right Reverend Arthur Crawshay Alliston Hall	S.T.D.	Bishop of Vermont
Samuel Walker McCall	LL.D.	Governor of Massachusetts

1917

Recipient	Degree or Honor	Notes
George Lockhart Rives	LL.D.	Retiring Chairman of the Trustees. Degree awarded in camera
Right Reverend Charles Henry Brent	S.T.D.	Bishop of the Philippine Islands
George Ellery Hale	Sc.D.	Director of Mt. Wilson Solar Observatory, Pasadena, California
Richard Townley Haines Halsey	A.M.	Author of Works on American Art
Frank Harris Hiscock	LL.D.	Chief Judge of the Court of Appeals of New York State
V.K. Wellington Koo	LL.D.	Minister of the Republic of China to the United States
Guglielmo Marconi	Sc.D.	Inventor
Anna Caroline Maxwell	A.M.	Directress of the School for Nursing, Presbyterian Hospital
Robert Andrews Millikan	Sc.D.	Professor of Physics at the University of Chicago
John Purroy Mitchel	LL.D.	Mayor of New York City
Paul Elmer More	Litt.D.	Author; Critic
Right Honorable Arthur James, O.M. Balfour	LL.D.	His Majesty's Secretary of State for Foreign Affairs (Special Convocation ceremony)
Right Honorable Baron of Headley Cunliffe	LL.D.	Governor of the Bank of England (Special convocation ceremony)
Joseph Jacques Cesaire Joffre	LL.D.	Marshal of France (Special Convocation ceremony)
Rene Viviani	LL.D.	Ministre de la Justice; Ancien President du Conseil (Special convocation ceremony)

1918

Recipient	Degree or Honor	Notes
Right Honorable and Most Reverend Cosmo Gordon Lang	LL.D.	Lord Archbishop of York, Primate of England and Metropolitan. Degree Awarded in camera.
Benjamin Cabanel	A.M.	Chaplain of the French Army
Justin Godart	LL.D.	French Under-Secretary of War
Fernand P.J. Baldensperger	Litt.D.	Professor at the Sorbonne; Visiting French Professor 1917–1918
Robert Lansing	LL.D.	Secretary of State
Thomas Tertisu Noble	A.M.	Organist; Composer
Paul Périgord	A.M.	Lieutenant in the French Army
Right Honorable Earl of Reading	LL.D.	British High Commissioner and Ambassador on Special Mission
Francis Markoe Scott	LL.D.	Formerly Justice of the Supreme Court of New York State
Jonas Walso Smith	Sc.D.	Engineer

1919

Recipient	Degree or Honor	Notes
George Arliss	A.M.	Actor and Playwright
Walter Jarvis Barlow	A.M.	Physician
Enoch Herbert Crowder	LL.D.	Major General, Judge Advocate General, United States Army
Maurice Francis Egan	Litt.D.	Minister of the United States to Denmark
Ralph Hodder-Williams	A.M.	Captain, Princess Patricia's Canadian Light Infantry
Viscount Kikujiro Ishii	Litt.D.	Ambassador from Japan to the United States
Edward Page Mitchell	Litt.D.	Editor of the New York Sun
Reverend John Timothy Stone	S.T.D.	Pastor of the Fourth Presbyterian Church
His Majesty, King of the Belgians Albert	LL.D.	Degree Awarded in camera. Special convocation ceremony.
His Eminence Desideratus Cardinal Mercier	LL.D.	Archbishop of Malines and Primate of Belgium (Special Convocation ceremony)

=== 1920s ===
1920

Recipient	Degree or Honor	Notes
Right Reverend Charles Henry Brent	LL.D.	Chief of the Chaplains' Service in the American Expeditionary Forces
Henry Pomeroy Davison	LL.D.	Chairman of the War Council, American Red Cross
Herbert Clark Hoover	LL.D.	Chairman of the Commission of Relief in Belgium; United States Food Administrator
John Joseph Pershing	LL.D.	General of the Armies of the United States; Commander-in-Chief of the American Expeditionary Forces
William Sowden Sims	LL.D.	Rear Admiral, United States Navy; President of the Naval War College; Commander of the United States Naval Forces Operating in European Waters During the Great War

1921

Recipient	Degree or Honor	Notes
James Rowland Angell	LL.D.	President-Elect of Yale University
Marie Sklodowska Curie	Sc.D.	Physicist
Robert Grant	Litt.D.	Author
Samuel Waldron Lambert	Sc.D.	Dean Emeritus of the Faculty of Medicine
Julius Marshall Mayer	LL.D.	Judge of the United States District Court
John Campbell Merriam	Sc.D.	President of the Carnegie Institution of Washington
Nathan Lewis Miller	LL.D.	Governor of New York State
Ferdinand Foch	LL.D.	Marshal of France (Special Convocation ceremony)
Aristide Briand	LL.D.	President of the Council of Ministers of the French Republic. Degree awarded in camera

1922

Recipient	Degree or Honor	Notes
Viscount d'Alte	LL.D.	Minister of Portugal
Baron de Cartier de Marchienne	LL.D.	Belgian Ambassador
William P.G. Harding	LL.D.	Governor of the Federal Reserve Board
Ignace Jan Paderewski	LL.D.	Prime Minister of the Republic of Poland
Mary Mills Patrick	Litt.D.	President of Constantinople Woman's College
Right Reverend Herbert Shipman	S.T.D.	Suffragan Bishop, Diocese of New York
Stephen Smith	Sc.D.	Physician; Public Servant
Frank Julian Sprague	Sc.D.	Engineer
Reverend Caleb Rochford Stetson	S.T.D.	Rector of Trinity Parish
Alfred Sao-Ke Sze	LL.D.	Minister of China
Augustus Thomas	Litt.D.	Playwright

1923

Recipient	Degree or Honor	Notes
William Shankland Andrews	LL.D.	Judge of the Court of Appeals of New York State
Very Reverend Duncan Hodge Browne	S.T.D.	Dean of the Cathedral at Denver, Colorado
Don Gelasio Benedetto Anatolio Caetani	LL.D.	Italian Ambassador
Frederick Evan Crane	LL.D.	Judge of the Court of Appeals of New York State
Wilbur Lucius Cross	Litt.D.	Dean of the Graduate School of Yale University
Very Reverend Hughell Edgar Woodall Fosbroke	S.T.D.	Dean of the General Theological Seminary
Remsen Brinckerhoff Ogilby	Litt.D.	President of Trinity College
Stephen Henry Olin	Litt.D.	Acting President of Wesleyan University

1924

Recipient	Degree or Honor	Notes
James Truslow Adams	Litt.D.	Historian
Robert Bridges	Litt.D.	Poet; Essayist
Victor Fremont Lawson	LL.D.	Journalist
Andrew William Mellon	LL.D.	Secretary of the Treasury
Adolph Simon Ochs	LL.D.	Journalist
Reverend Frederick Herbert Sill	Litt.D.	Headmaster of Kent School
Melville Elijah Stone	LL.D.	Journalist
Booth Tarkington	Litt.D.	Novelist

1925

Recipient	Degree or Honor	Notes
Robert Lee Bullard	LL.D.	Major General, United States Army, Retired
Henry Sloane Coffin	S.T.D.	Pastor, Madison Avenue Presbyterian Church
Irving Langmur	Sc.D.	Engineer
Harlan Fiske Stone	LL.D.	Justice of the Supreme Court
Owen D Young	LL.D.	Lawyer; Financier
John St. Loe Strachey	Litt.D.	Editor of the London Spectator

1926

Recipient	Degree or Honor	Notes
Walter Sydney Adams	Sc.D.	Director of the Mount Wilson Observatory
Edward Channing	Litt.D.	McLean Professor of History at Harvard University
Miles Farrow	Mus.D.	Organist and Master of the Choristers at the Cathedral of St. John the Divine
Max Mason	Sc.D.	President of the University of Chicago
Right Reverend John Gardner Murray	S.T.D.	Bishop of Maryland
Cuthbert Winfred Pound	LL.D.	Judge of the Court of Appeals
Alfred Emmanuel Smith	LL.D.	Governor of New York State
Right Reverend Ernest Milmore Stires	S.T.D.	Bishop of Long Island
Henry Osborn Taylor	Litt.D.	Historian; Critic
Right Reverend Arthur F Winnington Ingram	S.T.D.	Lord Bishop of London

1927

Recipient	Degree or Honor	Notes
Frank Baldwin Jewett	Sc.D.	Former President of the American Institute of Electrical Engineers
Irving Lehman	LL.D.	Judge of the Court of Appeals
William Pierson Merrill	S.T.D.	Pastor of the Brick Presbyterian Church
John Bassett Moore	LL.D.	Hamilton Fish Professor Emeritus of International Law and Diplomacy; Member of the Permanent Court of International Justice
Agnes Repplier	Litt.D.	Essayist
James Earl Russell	Litt.D.	Dean Emeritus of Teachers College
Joseph Sylvester (Brother Leon) Sauget	Sc.D.	Professor of Botany, Colegio de la Salle, Havana

1928

Recipient	Degree or Honor	Notes
Willem Mengelberg	Mus.D.	Conductor of The New York Philharmonic Society Orchestra
Antonio Barcelo	LL.D.	Senator of Puerto Rico
Murray Bartlett	S.T.D.	President of Hobart College
William Wallace Campbell	Sc.D.	Director of the Lick Observatory; President of the University of California
Willa Cather	Litt.D.	Author
Paul Louis Charles Claudel	LL.D.	Ambassador of the French Republic
Antonio Sanchez de Bustamante	LL.D.	Member of The Permanent Court of International Justice at the Hague; President of the Sixth Pan-American Conference, Havana, Cuba, 1928
Albert Charles Fox, S.J	LL.D.	President of St. Xavier College
Otto Marc Eidlitz	Sc.D.	Builder (Awarded at the Dedication of the New Medical Center)
Edward Stephen Harkness	LL.D.	Man of Affairs (Awarded at the Dedication of the New Medical Center)
James Gamble Rogers	Sc.D.	Architect (Awarded at the Dedication of the New Medical Center)
Dean Sage	LL.D.	Lawyer (Awarded at the Dedication of the New Medical Center)

1929

Recipient	Degree or Honor	Notes
Charles Templeman Loram	University Medal for Excellence	Ph.D. 1918. Department of Education, Piertermaritsburg, South Africa.
Percival Richard Cole	University Medal for Excellence	Ph.D. 1907. Vice-Principal of Sydney Teachers College.
Alfred Horation Martin	University Medal for Excellence	Ph.D. 1922. Professor of Psychology, Sydney University
John Seaman Bates	University Medal for Excellence	Chem.E. 1913; Ph.D. 1914; President of the Canadian Institute of Chemistry.
Samuel Henry Prince	University Medal for Excellence	Ph.D. 1920. Professor of Sociology, King's College, Halifax.
Walter Alexander Riddell	University Medal for Excellence	Ph.D. 1916. Dominion of Canada Official Adviser accredited to the League of Nations; chairman, Dominion Employment Council.
Petre Sandiford	University Medal for Excellence	Ph.D. 1910. Professor of Educational Psychology, University of Toronto.
Luis Alfredo Tirapeugui Leiva	University Medal for Excellence	Ph.D. 1924. Head of Department of Education in National University of Santiago.
Ta Chen	University Medal for Excellence	Ph.D. 1923. Professor of Sociology, tsing Hua College, Peking.
Yu-Gwan Chen	University Medal for Excellence	Ph.D. 1922. Chemist and Professor of Chemistry and recently President of Nanking University.
Mon-Lin Chiang	University Medal for Excellence	Ph.D. 1917. Minister of Education, Nationlist Government, Nanking.
Te-Pang Hou	University Medal for Excellence	Ph.D. 1921. Engineer.
Shih Hu	University Medal for Excellence	Ph.D. 1927. Dean of the Department of English Literature, National University, Peking.
Ping-Wen Kuo	University Medal for Excellence	Ph.D. 1914. Director of China Institute in America; formerly President of Southeastern University of Nanking.
Timothy Ting-Fang Lew	University Medal for Excellence	A.B. 1914; Ph.D. 1920; Dean of the School of Religion, Yenching University, Peking.
Herman Chan-En Liu	University Medal for Excellence	Ph.D. 1922; President of Shanghai College.
Fo Sun	University Medal for Excellence	M.S. 1917. Minister of Communications in Chinese cabinet.
Andrew Yu-Yue Tsu	University Medal for Excellence	Ph.D. 1912. Director of religious work, Pekling Union Medical College.
Cheng-Fu Wang	University Medal for Excellence	A.M. 1912. Engineer.
Chung-Yu Wang	University Medal for Excellence	A.M. 1904. Mining Engineer.
Wen-Tsao Wu	University Medal for Excellence	Ph.D. 1929. Assistant Professor of Sociology, Yenching University, Peking.
Hawkling Lugine Yen	University Medal for Excellence	Ph.D. 1911. Former President of Tsing Hua College; former Councillor of the Ministry of Foreigh Affairs; Secretary of the Institute of Pacific Relations, Honolulu.
Samuel Sung Young	University Medal for Excellence	A.M. 1905. Chinese Consul-General to New York City.
Chai-Lan Yu	University Medal for Excellence	Ph.D. 1922. Professor of Chemistry, University of Amoy.
Camilo Claudio Restrepo	University Medal for Excellence	E.M. 1887; C.E. 1889. Governor of the State of Antioquia.
Robert Loyalty Cru	University Medal for Excellence	Ph.D. 1913. Director of the French House in London.
Very Reverend Joseph Herman Hertz	University Medal for Excellence	Ph.D. 1894. Chief Rabbi of the United Hebrew Congregations of the British Empire.
Eric Higgins	University Medal for Excellence	Ph.D. 1908. Physical chemist.
Clarence Hunter Northcott	University Medal for Excellence	Ph.D. 1918. Personnel manager.
William DeBurgh Whyte	University Medal for Excellence	E.M. 1902. Engineer.
Camillo Andrei	University Medal for Excellence	M.E. 1908. Engineer.
Iwao Frederick Ayusawa	University Medal for Excellence	Ph.D. 1920. Japanese Representative at the International Labor Office, League of Nations, Geneva.
Seiji G. Hishida	University Medal for Excellence	Ph.D. 1906. Educational administrator.
Uichi Iwaskai	University Medal for Excellence	Ph.D. 1921. Professor of Sociology, Kobe University.
Yetaro Kinosita	University Medal for Excellence	Ph.D. 1902. Economist.
Seigo Takahashi	University Medal for Excellence	Ph.D. 1917. Professor of Government in Waseda University, Tokyo
Tomi Wada	University Medal for Excellence	Ph.D. 1922. Organizer and administrator of an experimental school; Chofu, Nagato.
Naohide Yatsu	University Medal for Excellence	Ph.D. 1905. Professor of Zoology, Tokyo University.
Manuel Barranco	University Medal for Excellence	B.S. 1911; Ph.D. 1914; Secretary of the University of Mexico.
Victor Manuel Braschi	University Medal for Excellence	Ph.B. 1881; E.M. 1883; C.E. 1884. Engineer.
Carlos Contreras	University Medal for Excellence	B.Arch. 1921. Architect; professor in the National University of Mexico.
Moises Saenz	University Medal for Excellence	A.M. 1921. Sub-Secretary, Ministry of Education, Mexico City.
Francisco Benitez	University Medal for Excellence	B.S. 1910; A.M. 1914. School of Education, Philippine University.
Camilo Osias	University Medal for Excellence	B.S. 1910. Formerly President of National University; Resident Commissioner of the Philippines at Washington, D.C.
Francisco A. Quisumbing	University Medal for Excellence	Ph.D. 1921. Professor of Chemistry, College of Agriculture, Lost Banos.
Juan Jose Osuna	University Medal for Excellence	Ph.D. 1923. Professor of Education in the University of Puerto Rico.
Bulus Kuzma Khauli	University Medal for Excellence	A.M. 1905. Head of Department of Education, University of Beirut.
Walter Arthur Bastedo	Sc.D.	Pharmacist-Physician; Medical Author (In Celebration of the One Hundredth Anniversary of the Foundation of the College of Pharmacy)
George Emerson Brewer	Sc.D.	Surgeon
Carlos Guillermo Davila	LL.D.	Ambassador of the Republic of Chile
Robert Anthony Hatcher	Sc.D.	Professor of Pharmacology at Cornell University (In Celebration of the One Hundredth Anniversary of the Foundation of the College of Pharmacy)
Vincent Massey	LL.D.	Minister of the Dominion of Canada
William Hallock Park	Sc.D.	Physician; Medical Officer
George Arthur Plimpton	Litt.D.	Trustee of Barnard College
Charles Frederick Schleussner	Sc.D.	Pharmacist (In Celebration of the One Hundredth Anniversary of the Foundation of the College of Pharmacy)
Wilbur Lincoln Scoville	Sc.D.	Chairman of the National Formulary Revision Committee (In Celebration of the One Hundredth Anniversary of the Foundation of the College of Pharmacy)
Frederick John Wulling	Sc.D.	Dean of the School of Pharmacy, University of Minnesota (In Celebration of the One Hundredth Anniversary of the Foundation of the College of Pharmacy)
Felix Adler	Litt.D.	Professor of Social and Political Ethics (Special Convocation in celebration of the 175th Anniversary of the Granting of the Original Charter to King's College, Columbia University)
Chester Holmes Aldrich	Litt.D.	Architect (Special Convocation in celebration of the 175th Anniversary of the Granting of the Original Charter to King's College, Columbia University)
Walter Hull Aldridge	Sc.D.	Engineer (Special Convocation in celebration of the 175th Anniversary of the Granting of the Original Charter to King's College, Columbia University)
Edwin Howard Armstrong	Sc.D.	Radio Engineer (Special Convocation in celebration of the 175th Anniversary of the Granting of the Original Charter to King's College, Columbia University)
Leo Hendrick Baekeland	Sc.D.	Honorary Professor of Chemical Engineering (Special Convocation in celebration of the 175th Anniversary of the Granting of the Original Charter to King's College, Columbia University)
Charles Sears Baldwin	Litt.D.	Professor of Rhetoric and English Composition (Special Convocation in celebration of the 175th Anniversary of the Granting of the Original Charter to King's College, Columbia University)
Walter Jarvis Barlow	Sc.D.	Physician (Special Convocation in celebration of the 175th Anniversary of the Granting of the Original Charter to King's College, Columbia University)
Frederick Mark Becket	Sc.D.	President of the Electro-Chemical Society (Special Convocation in celebration of the 175th Anniversary of the Granting of the Original Charter to King's College, Columbia University)
Bernard Iddings Bell	Litt.D.	Professor of Religion; Warden of St. Stephen's College (Special Convocation in celebration of the 175th Anniversary of the Granting of the Original Charter to King's College, Columbia University)
Charles Peter Berkey	Sc.D.	Professor of Geology (Special Convocation in celebration of the 175th Anniversary of the Granting of the Original Charter to King's College, Columbia University)
Maurice Alpheus Bigelow	Sc.D.	Professor of Biology; Director of the School of Practical Arts (Special Convocation in celebration of the 175th Anniversary of the Granting of the Original Charter to King's College, Columbia University)
Franz Boas	Sc.D.	Professor of Anthropology (Special Convocation in celebration of the 175th Anniversary of the Granting of the Original Charter to King's College, Columbia University)
Marston Taylor Bogert	Sc.D.	Professor of Organic Chemistry (Special Convocation in celebration of the 175th Anniversary of the Granting of the Original Charter to King's College, Columbia University)
William Alciphron Boring	Litt.D.	Professor of Design; Director of the School of Architecture (Special Convocation in celebration of the 175th Anniversary of the Granting of the Original Charter to King's College, Columbia University)
William Clarence Braisted	Sc.D.	Surgeon-General, United States Navy, Retired (Special Convocation in celebration of the 175th Anniversary of the Granting of the Original Charter to King's College, Columbia University)
William Tenney Brewster	Litt.D.	Professor of English (Special Convocation in celebration of the 175th Anniversary of the Granting of the Original Charter to King's College, Columbia University)
Reverend Roelif Hasbrouck Brooks	S.T.D.	Rector of St. Thomas's Church, New York (Special Convocation in celebration of the 175th Anniversary of the Granting of the Original Charter to King's College, Columbia University)
Gary Nathan Calkins	Sc.D.	Professor of Protozoology (Special Convocation in celebration of the 175th Anniversary of the Granting of the Original Charter to King's College, Columbia University)
William Campbell	Sc.D.	Howe Professor of Metalllurgy (Special Convocation in celebration of the 175th Anniversary of the Granting of the Original Charter to King's College, Columbia University)
Joseph Perkins Chamberlain	LL.D.	Professor of Public Law (Special Convocation in celebration of the 175th Anniversary of the Granting of the Original Charter to King's College, Columbia University)
John Bates Clark	LL.D.	Professor Emeritus of Political Economy (Special Convocation in celebration of the 175th Anniversary of the Granting of the Original Charter to King's College, Columbia University)
Reverend Cornelius Clifford	Litt.D.	Lecturer in Philosophy (Special Convocation in celebration of the 175th Anniversary of the Granting of the Original Charter to King's College, Columbia University)
Lotus Delta Coffman	LL.D.	President of the University of Minnesota (Special Convocation in celebration of the 175th Anniversary of the Granting of the Original Charter to King's College, Columbia University)
Harvey Wiley Corbett	Litt.D.	Associate in Design (Special Convocation in celebration of the 175th Anniversary of the Granting of the Original Charter to King's College, Columbia University)
John Jacob Coss	Litt.D.	Professor of Philosophy; Director of the Summer Session (Special Convocation in celebration of the 175th Anniversary of the Granting of the Original Charter to King's College, Columbia University)
Henry Edward Crampton	Sc.D.	Professor of Zoology (Special Convocation in celebration of the 175th Anniversary of the Granting of the Original Charter to King's College, Columbia University)
John William Cunliffe	Litt.D.	Professor of English; Director of the School of Journalism (Special Convocation in celebration of the 175th Anniversary of the Granting of the Original Charter to King's College, Columbia University)
William Darrach	Sc.D.	Professor of Clinical Surgery, Dean of the College of Physicians and Surgeons, Columbia University (Special Convocation in celebration of the 175th Anniversary of the Granting of the Original Charter to King's College, Columbia University)
Bergen Davis	Sc.D.	Professor of Physics (Special Convocation in celebration of the 175th Anniversary of the Granting of the Original Charter to King's College, Columbia University)
John Dewey	Litt.D.	Professor of Philosophy (Special Convocation in celebration of the 175th Anniversary of the Granting of the Original Charter to King's College, Columbia University)
Maneckji Nusservanji Dhalla	Litt.D.	High Priest of the Parsis of the Northwest India and Baluchistanv (Special Convocation in celebration of the 175th Anniversary of the Granting of the Original Charter to King's College, Columbia University)
William Bell Dinsmoor	Litt.D.	Professor of Architecture (Special Convocation in celebration of the 175th Anniversary of the Granting of the Original Charter to King's College, Columbia University)
Arthur Smith Dwight	Sc.D.	Engineer (Special Convocation in celebration of the 175th Anniversary of the Granting of the Original Charter to King's College, Columbia University)
James Chidester Egbert	Litt.D.	Professor of Latin; Director of University Extension and of the School of Business (Special Convocation in celebration of the 175th Anniversary of the Granting of the Original Charter to King's College, Columbia University)
Edward Charles Elliott	LL.D.	President of Purdue University (Special Convocation in celebration of the 175th Anniversary of the Granting of the Original Charter to King's College, Columbia University)
Richard Theodore Ely	LL.D.	Research Professor of Economics at Northwestern University (Special Convocation in celebration of the 175th Anniversary of the Granting of the Original Charter to King's College, Columbia University)
John Erskine	Litt.D.	Professor of English (Special Convocation in celebration of the 175th Anniversary of the Granting of the Original Charter to King's College, Columbia University)
Frank Diehl Fackenthal	Litt.D.	Secretary of the University (Special Convocation in celebration of the 175th Anniversary of the Granting of the Original Charter to King's College, Columbia University)
Livingston Farrand	LL.D.	President of Cornell University (Special Convocation in celebration of the 175th Anniversary of the Granting of the Original Charter to King's College, Columbia University)
James Fairman Fielder	LL.D.	Vice Chancellor of New Jersey; Governor of New Jersey, 1914-1917 (Special Convocation in celebration of the 175th Anniversary of the Granting of the Original Charter to King's College, Columbia University)
Robert Herndon Fife	Litt.D.	Gebhard Professor of Germanic Languages and Literatures (Special Convocation in celebration of the 175th Anniversary of the Granting of the Original Charter to King's College, Columbia University)
Edward Ridley Finch	LL.D.	Justice of the Supreme Court of New York State, Appellate Division (Special Convocation in celebration of the 175th Anniversary of the Granting of the Original Charter to King's College, Columbia University)
Dorothy Canfield Fisher	Litt.D.	Author (Special Convocation in celebration of the 175th Anniversary of the Granting of the Original Charter to King's College, Columbia University)
James Wilford Garner	Litt.D.	Professor of Political Science at the University of Illinois.
James Watson Gerard	LL.D.	Ambassador to Germany 1913-1917 (Special Convocation in celebration of the 175th Anniversary of the Granting of the Original Charter to King's College, Columbia University)
Franklin Henry Giddings	LL.D.	Professor Emeritus of Sociology and the History of Civilization in Residence (Special Convocation in celebration of the 175th Anniversary of the Granting of the Original Charter to King's College, Columbia University)
Virginia Crocheron Gildersleeve	Litt.D.	Professor of English; Dean of Barnard College (Special Convocation in celebration of the 175th Anniversary of the Granting of the Original Charter to King's College, Columbia University)
Meta Glass	Litt.D.	President of Sweet Briar College (Special Convocation in celebration of the 175th Anniversary of the Granting of the Original Charter to King's College, Columbia University)
Frederick Arthur Goetze	Sc.D.	Treasurer of Columbia University (Special Convocation in celebration of the 175th Anniversary of the Granting of the Original Charter to King's College, Columbia University)
Richard James Horatio Gottheil	Litt.D.	Professor of Rabbinical Literature and the Semitic Languages (Special Convocation in celebration of the 175th Anniversary of the Granting of the Original Charter to King's College, Columbia University)
Frank Pierrepont Graves	LL.D.	President of the University of New York State (Special Convocation in celebration of the 175th Anniversary of the Granting of the Original Charter to King's College, Columbia University)
Robert Almer Harper	Sc.D.	Torrey Professor of Botany (Special Convocation in celebration of the 175th Anniversary of the Granting of the Original Charter to King's College, Columbia University)
Herbert Edwin Hawkes	LL.D.	Professor of Mathematics; Dean of Columbia College (Special Convocation in celebration of the 175th Anniversary of the Granting of the Original Charter to King's College, Columbia University)
Carlton Joseph Huntley Hayes	Litt.D.	Professor of History (Special Convocation in celebration of the 175th Anniversary of the Granting of the Original Charter to King's College, Columbia University)
Patty Smith Hill	Litt.D.	Professor of Education (Special Convocation in celebration of the 175th Anniversary of the Granting of the Original Charter to King's College, Columbia University)
John Sherman Hoyt	LL.D.	Trustee of the Babies' Hospital (Special Convocation in celebration of the 175th Anniversary of the Granting of the Original Charter to King's College, Columbia University)
Walter Albert Jessup	LL.D.	President of the University of Iowa (Special Convocation in celebration of the 175th Anniversary of the Granting of the Original Charter to King's College, Columbia University)
Allen Johnson	Litt.D.	Editor of the Dictionary of American Biography (Special Convocation in celebration of the 175th Anniversary of the Granting of the Original Charter to King's College, Columbia University)
Douglas Wilson Johnson	Sc.D.	Professor of Physiography (Special Convocation in celebration of the 175th Anniversary of the Granting of the Original Charter to King's College, Columbia University)
Adam Leroy Jones	Litt.D.	Associate Professor of Philosophy; Director of University Admissions (Special Convocation in celebration of the 175th Anniversary of the Granting of the Original Charter to King's College, Columbia University)
Walter Guest Kellogg	LL.D.	Regent of the University of the State of New York (Special Convocation in celebration of the 175th Anniversary of the Granting of the Original Charter to King's College, Columbia University)
Frederick Pual Keppel	Litt.D.	President of the Carnegie Corporation (Special Convocation in celebration of the 175th Anniversary of the Granting of the Original Charter to King's College, Columbia University)
Cassius Jackson Keyser	Sc.D.	Adrain Professor Emeritus of Mathematics (Special Convocation in celebration of the 175th Anniversary of the Granting of the Original Charter to King's College, Columbia University)
William Heard Kilpatrick	Litt.D.	Professor of Education (Special Convocation in celebration of the 175th Anniversary of the Granting of the Original Charter to King's College, Columbia University)
Charles Knapp	Litt.D.	Professor of Greek and Latin (Special Convocation in celebration of the 175th Anniversary of the Granting of the Original Charter to King's College, Columbia University)
Horatio Sheafe Krans	Litt.D.	Associate Director of the American University Union in Paris (Special Convocation in celebration of the 175th Anniversary of the Granting of the Original Charter to King's College, Columbia University)
Edward Lazansky	LL.D.	Presiding Justice of the Supreme Court of New York State, Appellate Division, Second Judicial Department (Special Convocation in celebration of the 175th Anniversary of the Granting of the Original Charter to King's College, Columbia University)
Frederic Schiller Lee	Sc.D.	Professor of Physiology (Special Convocation in celebration of the 175th Anniversary of the Granting of the Original Charter to King's College, Columbia University)
Gonzalez Lodge	Litt.D.	Professor of Latin and Greek (Special Convocation in celebration of the 175th Anniversary of the Granting of the Original Charter to King's College, Columbia University)
Charles Edward Lucke	Sc.D.	Professor of Mechanical Engineering (Special Convocation in celebration of the 175th Anniversary of the Granting of the Original Charter to King's College, Columbia University)
Robert Morrison MacIver	Litt.D.	Professor of Social Science (Special Convocation in celebration of the 175th Anniversary of the Granting of the Original Charter to King's College, Columbia University)
Valentine Everit Macy	LL.D.	Chairman of the Trustees of Teachers College (Special Convocation in celebration of the 175th Anniversary of the Granting of the Original Charter to King's College, Columbia University)
Walter Taylor Marvin	Litt.D.	Professor of Philosophy; Dean of the College of Arts and Sciences at Rutgers University (Special Convocation in celebration of the 175th Anniversary of the Granting of the Original Charter to King's College, Columbia University)
Howard Lee McBain	LL.D.	Ruggles Professor of Political Science and Constitutional Law; Dean of Faculties of Political Science, Philosophy, and Pure Science (Special Convocation in celebration of the 175th Anniversary of the Granting of the Original Charter to King's College, Columbia University)
Nelson Glenn McCrea	Litt.D.	Anthon Professor of the Latin Language and Literature. (Special Convocation in celebration of the 175th Anniversary of the Granting of the Original Charter to King's College, Columbia University)
Roswell Cheney McCrea	LL.D.	Hepburn Professor of Economics (Special Convocation in celebration of the 175th Anniversary of the Granting of the Original Charter to King's College, Columbia University)
James Alexander Miller	Sc.D.	Professor of Clinical Medicine (Special Convocation in celebration of the 175th Anniversary of the Granting of the Original Charter to King's College, Columbia University)
Wesley Clair Mitchell	LL.D.	Professor of Economics (Special Convocation in celebration of the 175th Anniversary of the Granting of the Original Charter to King's College, Columbia University)
Paul Monroe	Litt.D.	Barnard Professor of Education (Special Convocation in celebration of the 175th Anniversary of the Granting of the Original Charter to King's College, Columbia University)
Frank Gardner Moore	Litt.D.	Professor of Latin (Special Convocation in celebration of the 175th Anniversary of the Granting of the Original Charter to King's College, Columbia University)
Daniel Edward Moran	Sc.D.	Engineer (Special Convocation in celebration of the 175th Anniversary of the Granting of the Original Charter to King's College, Columbia University)
Benjamin Wistar Morris	Litt.D.	Architect (Special Convocation in celebration of the 175th Anniversary of the Granting of the Original Charter to King's College, Columbia University)
Kenneth Mackenzie Murchison	Litt.D.	Architect (Special Convocation in celebration of the 175th Anniversary of the Granting of the Original Charter to King's College, Columbia University)
George Clinton Densmore Odell	Litt.D.	Professor of Dramatic Literature (Special Convocation in celebration of the 175th Anniversary of the Granting of the Original Charter to King's College, Columbia University)
Alfred Owre	Sc.D.	Professor of Dentistry; Dean of the Faculty of Dentistry (Special Convocation in celebration of the 175th Anniversary of the Granting of the Original Charter to King's College, Columbia University)
Walter Walker Palmer	Sc.D.	Bard Professor of the Practice of Medicine (Special Convocation in celebration of the 175th Anniversary of the Granting of the Original Charter to King's College, Columbia University)
Bruce Ryburn Payne	Litt.D.	President of George Peabody College for Teachers (Special Convocation in celebration of the 175th Anniversary of the Granting of the Original Charter to King's College, Columbia University)
George Braxton Pegram	Sc.D.	Professor of Physics; Dean of the Faculty of Engineering (Special Convocation in celebration of the 175th Anniversary of the Granting of the Original Charter to King's College, Columbia University)
Ulrich Bonnell Phillips	Litt.D.	Professor of American History at Yale University (Special Convocation in celebration of the 175th Anniversary of the Granting of the Original Charter to King's College, Columbia University)
John Russell Pope	Litt.D.	Architect (Special Convocation in celebration of the 175th Anniversary of the Granting of the Original Charter to King's College, Columbia University)
Reverend Francis Lister Hawks Pott	S.T.D.	President of St. John's University, Shanghai (Special Convocation in celebration of the 175th Anniversary of the Granting of the Original Charter to King's College, Columbia University)
Joseph Meyer Proskauer	LL.D.	Justice of the Supreme Court of New York State, Appellate Division (Special Convocation in celebration of the 175th Anniversary of the Granting of the Original Charter to King's College, Columbia University)
Sylvanus Albert Reed	Sc.D.	Engineer (Special Convocation in celebration of the 175th Anniversary of the Granting of the Original Charter to King's College, Columbia University)
William Zebina Ripley	Litt.D.	Professor of Political Economy at Harvard University (Special Convocation in celebration of the 175th Anniversary of the Granting of the Original Charter to King's College, Columbia University)
Henry Hurd Rusby	Sc.D.	Professor of Materia Medica; Dean of the College of Pharmacy (Special Convocation in celebration of the 175th Anniversary of the Granting of the Original Charter to King's College, Columbia University)
William Fletcher Russell	LL.D.	Professor of Education and Dean of Teachers College (Special Convocation in celebration of the 175th Anniversary of the Granting of the Original Charter to King's College, Columbia University)
Julius Sachs	Litt.D.	Professor Emeritus of Education (Special Convocation in celebration of the 175th Anniversary of the Granting of the Original Charter to King's College, Columbia University)
Edward Sapir	Sc.D.	Professor of Anthropology and General Linguistics in the University of Chicago (Special Convocation in celebration of the 175th Anniversary of the Granting of the Original Charter to King's College, Columbia University)
Henry Rogers Seager	Litt.D.	Professor of Political Economy (Special Convocation in celebration of the 175th Anniversary of the Granting of the Original Charter to King's College, Columbia University)
William Robert Shepherd	Litt.D.	Seth Low Professor of History (Special Convocation in celebration of the 175th Anniversary of the Granting of the Original Charter to King's College, Columbia University)
Henry Clapp Sherman	Sc.D.	Mitchell Professor of Chemistry (Special Convocation in celebration of the 175th Anniversary of the Granting of the Original Charter to King's College, Columbia University)
James Thomson Shotwell	LL.D.	Professor History (Special Convocation in celebration of the 175th Anniversary of the Granting of the Original Charter to King's College, Columbia University)
David Eugene Smith	Sc.D.	Professor Emeritus of Mathematics (Special Convocation in celebration of the 175th Anniversary of the Granting of the Original Charter to King's College, Columbia University)
Joseph Russell Smith	Sc.D.	Professor of Economic Geography (Special Convocation in celebration of the 175th Anniversary of the Granting of the Original Charter to King's College, Columbia University)
Young Berryman Smith	LL.D.	Professor of Law and Dean of the Faculty of Law (Special Convocation in celebration of the 175th Anniversary of the Granting of the Original Charter to King's College, Columbia University)
George Drayton Strayer	Litt.D.	Professor of Education (Special Convocation in celebration of the 175th Anniversary of the Granting of the Original Charter to King's College, Columbia University)
Henry Suzzallo	LL.D.	Former President of the University of Washington (Special Convocation in celebration of the 175th Anniversary of the Granting of the Original Charter to King's College, Columbia University)
Ashley Horace Thorndike	Litt.D.	Professor of English (Special Convocation in celebration of the 175th Anniversary of the Granting of the Original Charter to King's College, Columbia University)
Robert Thorne	LL.B.	President of the Neurological Institute (Special Convocation in celebration of the 175th Anniversary of the Granting of the Original Charter to King's College, Columbia University)
Frederick Tilney	Sc.D.	Professor of Neurology and Neuro-Anatomy (Special Convocation in celebration of the 175th Anniversary of the Granting of the Original Charter to King's College, Columbia University)
Augustus Trowbridge	Sc.D.	Dean of the Graduate School of Princeton University (Special Convocation in celebration of the 175th Anniversary of the Granting of the Original Charter to King's College, Columbia University)
Milton Haight Turk	Litt.D.	Professor of English and Dean of Hobart College (Special Convocation in celebration of the 175th Anniversary of the Granting of the Original Charter to King's College, Columbia University)
Allen Oldfather Whipple	Sc.D.	Professor of Surgery (Special Convocation in celebration of the 175th Anniversary of the Granting of the Original Charter to King's College, Columbia University)
Norman Wilde	Litt.D.	Professor of Philosophy at the University of Minnesota (Special Convocation in celebration of the 175th Anniversary of the Granting of the Original Charter to King's College, Columbia University)
Charles Clarence Williamson	Litt.D.	Professor of Literary Administration; Director of University Libraries and of the School of Library Service (Special Convocation in celebration of the 175th Anniversary of the Granting of the Original Charter to King's College, Columbia University)
Bailey Willis	Sc.D.	Professor Emeritus of Geology in Stanford University (Special Convocation in celebration of the 175th Anniversary of the Granting of the Original Charter to King's College, Columbia University)
Henry Parker Wilson	LL.D.	Professor of Banking (Special Convocation in celebration of the 175th Anniversary of the Granting of the Original Charter to King's College, Columbia University)
Frederick James Eugene Woodbridge	LL.D.	Johnsonian Professor of Philosophy; Dean of the Faculties of Political Science, Philosophy, and Pure Science from 1912 to 1929 (Special Convocation in celebration of the 175th Anniversary of the Granting of the Original Charter to King's College, Columbia University)
Robert Sessions Woodsworth	Sc.D.	Professor of Psychology (Special Convocation in celebration of the 175th Anniversary of the Granting of the Original Charter to King's College, Columbia University)
John Munro Woolsey	LL.D.	Judge of the United States District Court (Special Convocation in celebration of the 175th Anniversary of the Granting of the Original Charter to King's College, Columbia University)
Elwood Worcester	ST.D.	Rector of Emmanuel Church, Boston (Special Convocation in celebration of the 175th Anniversary of the Granting of the Original Charter to King's College, Columbia University)
Hans Zinsser	Sc.D.	Professor of Bacteriology and Immunology at Harvard University (Special Convocation in celebration of the 175th Anniversary of the Granting of the Original Charter to King's College, Columbia University)

=== 1930s ===
1930

Recipient	Degree or Honor	Notes
Marcus Benjamin	University Medal for Excellence	Ph.B. 1878. Graduated from the School of Mines with the Class of 1878; lifelong servant of both science and letters, rendering constant and effective service to both at the capital of the nation.
John Marshall Chew	University Medal for Excellence	A.B. 1883. Rector of Good Shepherd Parish, Newburgh, New York, from 1892.
Richard H. Cobden	University Medal for Excellence	A.B. 1886. Rector of St. John's Parish, Larchmont, New York, from 1897 to 1923; Rector Emeritus, 1923.
Elbert Floyd-Jones	University Medal for Excellence	A.B. 1889; A.M. 1890. Record of St. Mary's Parish, Cold Spring, New York, from 1896.
Leonard Beecher McWhood	University Medal for Excellence	A.B. 1893. Effective member of the Department of Music at Columbia University from 1898 to 1910; now Professor of Music at Dartmouth College.
Jan Christian Smuts	LL.D.	Prime Minister of the Union of South Africa, 1919–1924. Degree awarded in camera
Edward Dean Adams	Sc.D.	Engineer; Man of Affairs
Duchess of Atholl Atholl	LL.D.	Member of the House of Commons and Former Parliamentary Secretary, Board of Education
William Warner Bishop	Litt.D.	Librarian of the University of Michigan
Charles Butler	Litt.D.	Architect
Henry Evertson Cobb	ST.D.	Senior Minister of the Collegiate Church
Victor James Dowling	LL.D.	Presiding Justice of the Supreme Court of New York State, Appellate Division, First Department
Milo Hudson Gates	ST.D.	Dean of the Cathedral of St. John the Divine
Cass Gilbert	Litt.D.	Architect; President of the National Academy of Design
William Gillete	Litt.D.	Actor; Playwright
Charles Sumner Hamlin	LL.D.	Member of the Federal Reserve Board
Learned Hand	LL.D.	Judge of the United States Circuit Court, Second Circuit
Arnold Herman Knapp	Sc.D.	Professor of Ophthalmology, 1904–1928
George Wellwood Murray	LL.D.	Lawyer; Awarded at the Dedication of the New Medical Center
Oscar H. Rogers	Sc.D.	Physician
Sir John Charles Stamp	LL.D.	Economist; Administrator
Baron of Ash (formerly Tomlin, Thomas James Chesshyre) Tomlin	LL.D.	Lord of Appeal in Ordinary; (Special Convocation)
Pierre Arminjon	LL.D.	Formerly French Judge at the Mixed Tribunal of Egypt (Special Convocation)
Maitre Henri Decugis	LL.D.	Avocat a la Cour d'Appel de Paris (Special Convocation)
Viscount (formerly Murray, Andrew Graham) Dunedin	LL.D.	Lord of Appeal in Ordinary (Special Convocation)
Roger Burrow Gregory	LL.D.	President of the Law Society (Special Convocation)
Sir William Allen Jowitt	LL.D.	Attorney General of England (Special Convocation)
Baron of Aberfeldy (formerly Macmillan, Lord Hugh Pattison) Macmillan	LL.D.	Lord of Appeal in Ordinary (Special Convocation)
Sir Frederick Pollock	LL.D.	Sometime Corpus Professor of Jurisprudence at Oxford University (Special Convocation)
Walter Simons	LL.D.	Formerly President of the Supreme Court of the German Reich; Acting President of the German Reich, March to May 1925 (Special Convocation)

1931

Recipient	Degree or Honor	Notes
Mabel Smith Douglass	University Medal for Excellence	A.B. Barnard, 1899. Eager and effective administrator of all that pertains to the higher education of women.
John Driscoll Fitzgerald, II	University Medal for Excellence	A.B. 1895; Ph.D. 1906. Thoroughly trained scholar and teacher in the field of Romance philology, and particularly in the language and literature of the Spanish people.
Harry Harkenss Flagler	University Medal for Excellence	A.B. 1897. Generous and untiring in promoting music of the highest type for the instruction and cultivation of the people.
Frank Sutliff Hackett	University Medal for Excellence	A.B. 1899. High-minded and devoted guide and counselor of American youth.
George Samuel Rice	University Medal for Excellence	E.M. 1887. Foremost authority on safety appliances in mines, honored by scientific societies in many lands for contributions to the literature of mining engineering.
William Jay Schieffelin	University Medal for Excellence	Ph.B. 1887. For many years counselor and friend of the College of Pharmacy, untiring and fearless in works of good citizenship.
Solomon Marcuse Stroock	University Medal for Excellence	A.M. 1892; LL.B. 1894. Generous and devoted in many types of unofficial public service and in supporting and directing important public charities.
Jay Downer	Sc.D.	Engineer
Luther Pfahler Eisenhart	Sc.D.	Professor of Mathematics at Princeton University; Dean of the Faculty
Edna Ferber	Litt.D.	Author
Claude Moore Fuess	Litt.D.	Author
Francis Pendleton Gaines Gaines	Litt.D.	President of Washington and Lee University
Seymour Parker Gilbert	LL.D.	Formerly Agent-General for Reparation Payments of Germany
Frank Porter Graham	Litt.D.	President of the University of North Carolina
Charles Judson Herrick	Sc.D.	Professor of Neurology at the University of Chicago
Sir Ronald Lindsay Lindsay	LL.D.	British Ambassador at Washington
Arthur Dehon Little	Sc.D.	Chemical Engineer
James de Wolf Perry	S.T.D.	Presiding Bishop of the Protestant Episcopal Church in the United States
Sir James Arthur Salter	LL.D.	Director of the Economic and Finance Section of the League of Nations; Secretary of the British Department of the Supreme Council, 1919
Freiedrich Wilhelm von Prittwitz und Gaffron	LL.D.	German Ambassador at Washington
Granville Mercer Williams	S.T.D.	Rector of the Church of St. Mary the Virgin

1932

Recipient	Degree or Honor	Notes
Edwin Cornelius Broome	University Medal for Excellence	Ph.D. 1902. Superindentent of schools at Philadelphia.
Clarence Herbert Cook	University Medal for Excellence	Student in Columbia College from 1875 to 1877. Teacher in the Columbia Grammar School.
Leon Fraser	University Medal for Excellence	A.B. 1909; A.M. 1912; B.Litt. 1913; Ph.D. 1915. Alternate to the President, Bank for International Settlements.
John Kinsey Gore	University Medal for Excellence	A.B. 1883; A.M. 1886. Actuary and Vice President of the Prudential Life Insurance Company.
Clayton Hamilton	University Medal for Excellence	A.M. 1901. Playwright and Dramatic Critic.
Joseph Gregoire de Roulhac Hamilton	University Medal for Excellence	Ph.D. 1906. Kenan Professor of History and Government in the University of North Carolina.
Emil Joseph	University Medal for Excellence	A.B.1879; LL.B. 1881. Member of the Bar, Cleveland, Ohio.
Charles Riborg Mann	University Medal for Excellence	A.B. 1890; A.M. 1891. Director of the American Council on Education; Chairman of President's Advisory Committee on Federal Relations to Education.
Richard Cunningham Patterson Jr.	University Medal for Excellence	E.M. 1912. Commissioner of Correction of the City of New York.
William Bogert Walker	University Medal for Excellence	A.B. 1865. Clergyman.
Sebastian Charléty	LL.D.	Rector of the University of Paris
Gerhart Hauptmann	Litt.D.	Author. Degree awarded in camera
Edwin Hatfield Anderson	Litt.D.	Director of the New York Public Library
Robert Frost	Litt.D.	Poet; Maker of the American Academy of Arts and Letters
Dugald Caleb Jackson	Sc.D.	Professor of Electric Power Production and Distribution at the Massachusetts Institute of Technology
Thomas William Lamont	LL.D.	Man of Affairs
Channing Lefebvre	Mus.D.	Organist and Choirmaster of Trinity Church
Walter Lippman	Litt.D.	Journalist; Man of Letters
George Norlin	Litt.D.	President of the University of Colorado
Albert Henry Wiggin	LL.D.	Man of Affairs
Alice Pleasance Hargreaves	Litt.D.	Alice in Wonderland

1933

Recipient	Degree or Honor	Notes
John Arthur Barratt	University Medal for Excellence	LL.B. 1880.
Alfred Chester Beatty	University Medal for Excellence	E.M. 1898.
Henry Dwight Chapin	University Medal for Excellence	M.D. 1881
Ellwood Patterson Conner	University Medal for Excellence	A.M. 1902; Ph.D.1905
Chester Welde Cuthell	University Medal for Excellence	A.B. 1905; LL.B. 1907
Lucetta Daniell	University Medal for Excellence	Recently retired from that important post at Teachers College, in which for a long generation she rendered most effective service to the women students of that part of the university's educational system.
Lawton Bryab Evans	University Medal for Excellence	A.M. Georgia, 1881. Just now completing fifty years of unbroken service as Superintendent of Schools in the State of Georgia, with a well-earned reputation as administrator, as orator, and as public-spirited citizen.
William Livingston Hazen	University Medal for Excellence	A.B. 1883; LL.B. 1885
Robinson Godfrey Jones	University Medal for Excellence	A.M. 1912
William Langer	University Medal for Excellence	A.B. 1910
Charles Mandred Lum	University Medal for Excellence	A.B. 1881
Alice Duer Miller	University Medal for Excellence	A.B. Barnard, 1899.
Richard Alexander Parker	University Medal for Excellence	C.E. 1878; E.M. 1896
Geoffrey Parsons	University Medal for Excellence	A.B. 1899; LL.B. 1903
Albert Payson Terhune	University Medal for Excellence	A.B. 1893
Bailey Kelly Ashford	Sc.D.	Mycologist
David Prescott Barrows	Litt.D.	Professor of Political Science at the University of California
Charles Culp Burlingham	LL.D.	Lawyer
Norman Hezekiah Davis	LL.D.	Chairman of the Delegation of the United States to the General Disarmament Conference at Geneva
Thomas Stearns Eliot	Litt.D.	Charles Eliot Norton Professor of Poetry at Harvard University
Rufus Matthew Jones	S.T.D.	Professor of Philosophy at Haverford College
Stanley King	LL.D.	President of Amherst College
William Lyon Phelps	Litt.D.	Lampson Professor of English Literature at Yale University
Samuel Seabury	LL.D.	Lawyer
Charles Warren	LL.D.	Lawyer
William Morton Wheeler	Sc.D.	Professor of Entomology at Harvard University
Sir Walter Thomas Layton	LL.D.	Teacher; Public Servant. Degree Awarded in camera
Will Spens	LL.D.	Master and Chancellor of Corpus Christi College, Cambridge. Degree Awarded in camera

1934

Recipient	Degree or Honor	Notes
Herbert Sebastian Agar	University Medal for Excellence	A.B. 1919
Francis Blossom	University Medal for Excellence	C.E. 1891
James Brown	University Medal for Excellence	Of the Class of 1883, Engineering
Lewis Einstein	University Medal for Excellence	A.B. 1898, A.M. 1899
Peter B. Grimm	University Medal for Excellence	B.S. 1911
Jacob Barstow Smull	University Medal for Excellence	Of the Class of 1896, Engineering
Arthur Hays Sulzburger	University Medal for Excellence	B.S. 1913
Jonathan Mayhew Wainwright	University Medal for Excellence	A.B. 1884; LL.B. 1886
Tung-Li Yuan	University Medal for Excellence	A.B. 1922
John Buchan	Litt.D.	Lord High Commissioner to the Church of Scotland. Degree Awarded in camera
Ernest William Brown	Sc.D.	Josiah Willard Gibbs Professor Emeritus of Mathematics at Yale University
Harry Woodburn Chase	Litt.D.	Chancellor of New York University
James Bryant Conant	Sc.D.	President of Harvard University
Harold Willis Dodds	Litt.D.	President of Princeton University
James Aloysius Foley	LL.D.	Surrogate of New York County
Calvin Bryce Hoover	Litt.D.	Professor of Economics at Duke University
Cordell Hull	LL.D.	Secretary of State
John Maynard Keynes	LL.D.	Economist
Russel Henry Stafford	S.T.D.	Minister of Old South Church, Boston

1935

Recipient	Degree or Honor	Notes
Eugene Aloysius Colligan	University Medal for Excellence	B.S. 1908
Lincoln Ellsworth	University Medal for Excellence	Of the Class of 1905, Engineering
Thomas Ewing	University Medal for Excellence	A.B. 1885; A.M. 1886
Mabel Hyde Kittredge	University Medal for Excellence	Social Worker; who has given years of an active life to improving the living and housekeeping conditions of tens of thousands of dwellers on Manhattan Island.
Grover Cleveland Loening	University Medal for Excellence	B.S. 1909; A.M. 1910; C.E. 1911
Tingfu Fuller Tsiang	University Medal for Excellence	PhD. 1923
Frank Vinsonhaler	University Medal for Excellence	M.D.1885
Reverend Winfred Hamlin Ziegler	University Medal for Excellence	A.B. 1911
Right Honorable and Most Reverend William Temple		Lord Archbishop of York; Primate of England and Metropolitan (Special University Convocation)
William Slocum Barstow	Sc.D.	Electrical Engineer
William Bondy	LL.D.	Judge of the United States District Court
Tyler Dennett	Litt.D.	President of Williams College
Harvey Fletcher	Sc.D.	Electrical Engineer
Dixon Ryan Fox	Litt.D.	President of Union College
Most Reverend John Joseph Glennon	LL.D.	Archbishiop of St. Louis
Edwin Walter Kemmerer	LL.D.	Research Professor of International Finance at Princeton University
Right Reverend Warren Lincoln Rogers	S.T.D.	Bishop of Ohio
Helen Waddell	Litt.D.	Woman of Letters
Henry Agard Wallace	LL.D.	Secretary of Agriculture
Rafael Altamira y Crevea	LL.D.	Lawyer; Professor; Public Servant. Degree awarded in absentia
Sir James Colquhoun Irvine	LL.D.	Scientist; Educational Administrator
Count Carlo Sforza	LL.D.	Government Official in Italy
Count Paul Teleki	LL.D.	Government Official in Hungary
Erich von Prittwitz und Gaffron		Public Servant

1936

Recipient	Degree or Honor	Notes
Frank Lusk Babbott	University Medal for Excellence	M.D. 1918
Francis Burke Brandt	University Medal for Excellence	Ph.D. 1895
Lincoln Cromwell	University Medal for Excellence	A.B. 1886; A.M. 1888; LL.B. 1889
Thomas Edmund Dewey	University Medal for Excellence	LL.B. 1925
Victor Elting	University Medal for Excellence	A.B. 1891
Robert Ogden Purves	University Medal for Excellence	Class of 1920
John Angel	Litt.D.	Sculptor
Sigismund Cybichowski	LL.D.	Lawyer; Professor
William Francis Giauque	Sc.D.	Professor of Chemistry at the University of California
Reverend Leicester Crosby Lewis	S.T.D.	Rector of the Church of St. Martin in the Fields, Philadelphia
William Mather Lewis	LL.D.	President of Lafayette College
Ellen Fitz Pendleton	Litt.D.	President of Wellesley College
Stephen Joseph Pigott	Sc.D.	Engineer
Charles Brown Spears	LL.D.	Justice of the Supreme Court of New York State
Sarah Wambaugh	LL.D.	Technical Expert; Deputy Member of the (Saar) Plebiscite Commission

1937

Recipient	Degree or Honor	Notes
Edward Bruce	University Medal for Excellence	A.B. 1901; LL.B. 1904. Artist.
Carlos Contreras	University Medal for Excellence	B.Arch. 1921. Architect.
Harold Fowler	University Medal for Excellence	A.B. 1908. First Deputy Police Commissioner of the City of New York.
Robert Moses	University Medal for Excellence	Ph.D. 1914. New York City Park Commissioner.
Paul Windels	University Medal for Excellence	A.B. 1908. Corporation Counsel of the City of New York.
Helen Young	University Medal for Excellence	Director of the Presbyterian Hospital School of Nursing.
Van Wyck Brooks	Litt.D.	Man of Letters
Robert Broom	Sc.D.	Scientist
Reverend William Adams Brown	S.T.D.	Professor Emeritus at Union Theological Seminary
Right Reverend Willia Leopold Essex	S.T.D.	Bishop of the Diocese of Quincy, Illinois
Right Honorable Herbert Albert Laurens Fisher	Litt.D.	Warden of New College, Oxford
Carter Glass	LL.D.	United States Senator from Virginia
John Clark Knox	LL.D.	Judge of the United States District Court
John Howard Northrop	Sc.D.	Scientist
I.N. Phelps Stokes	Litt.D.	Architect
Mary Emma Woolley	Litt.D.	President of Mount Holyoke College
Hennry Merritt Wriston	Litt.D.	President of Brown University
Right Reverend Winfred Hamlin Ziegler	S.T.D.	Missionary Bishop of the Diocese of Wyoming
Edgar Algernon Robert	LL.D.	Viscount Cecil of Chelwood, P.C. Degree awarded in camera

1938

Recipient	Degree or Honor	Notes
George Arents Jr.	University Medal for Excellence	Of the Class of 1897. Corporation Executive.
Harold Riegelman	University Medal for Excellence	LL.B. and A.M. 1916; Lawyer.
George Ephraim Sokolsky	University Medal for Excellence	Of the Class of 1917, Journalism. Newspaper correspondent and man of letters.
Samuel Clifton Thomson	University Medal for Excellence	E.M. 1893
Edward Larocque Tinker	University Medal for Excellence	A.B. 1902
Célestin Bouglé	Litt.D.	Directeur de L'École Normale Superiéure. Degree awarded in camera
Alfred Chester Beatty	Sc.D.	Mining Engineer
José Castillejo	Litt.D.	Professor of Law at the University of Madrid
Gano Dunn	Sc.D.	Electrical Engineer
Sir Herbert John Clifford Grierson	Litt.D.	Lord Rector of the University of Edinburgh
James Hampton Kirkland	Litt.D.	Chancellor Emeritus of Vanderbilt University
Thomas Mann	Litt.D.	Author
Philip James McCook	LL.D.	Justice of the Supreme Court of New York State
Joseph Christopher O'Mahoney	LL.D.	United States Senator from Wyoming
Thomas Parran Jr.	Sc.D.	Surgeon-General of the United States
Charles Seymour	Litt.D.	President of Yale University
Reverend Joseph Richard Sizoo	S.T.D.	Pastor of the Collegiate Church of St. Nicholas, New York City
Oliver Mitchell Wentworth Sprague	Litt.D.	Economist
Robert Gordon Sproul	Litt.D.	President of the University of California
Dorothy Thompson Lewis	Litt.D.	Journalist
Walter Robert Matthews	S.T.D.	Dean of St. Paul's Cathedral, London

1939

Recipient	Degree or Honor	Notes
Henry Brundage Culver	University Medal for Excellence	LL.B. 1893. Lawyer.
Gustavus Town Kirby	University Medal for Excellence	E.E. 1895; LL.B. 1898
Ferdinand Kuhn Jr.	University Medal for Excellence	A.B. 1925. London correspondent of the New York Times.
Harriet Beardslee Prescott	University Medal for Excellence	Litt.D. Mount Holyoke, 1936. Now retiring after a full half-century of devoted and indispensable service in the Library of this university.
Baldwin of Bewdley	LL.D.	Prime Minister and First Lord of the Treasury of England
Fred Clarke	Litt.D.	Professor of Education; Director of the Institute of Education at the University of London
Edouard Herriot	LL.D.	President of the Chamber of Deputies. Degree awarded in absentia
John Murray	Litt.D.	Principal of the University of Southwest of England
Eustace Percy	LL.D.	Rector of Newcastle Division of Durham University
William David Ross	Litt.D.	Member of the Order of the British Empire
Carl Lotus Becker	Litt.D.	Professor of History at Cornell University
Eduard Beneš	LL.D.	President of Czechoslovakia
Evangeline Cory Booth	LL.D.	International Head of the Salvation Army
Mortimer Wardle Byers	LL.D.	Judge of the United States District Court for the Eastern district of New York
Guy Stanton Ford	Litt.D.	President of the University of Minnesota
Robert Sanderson Mulliken	Sc.D.	Professor of Physics at the University of Chicago
Hu Shih	LL.D.	Chinese Ambassador in Washington
Robert Crooks Stanley	Sc.D.	Chairman of the trustees of Stevens Institute of Technology
Henry St. George Tucker	S.T.D.	Presiding Bishop of the Protestant Episcopal Church in the United States
Sumner Welles	LL.D.	Under Secretary of State of the United States
Phineas Lawrence Windsor	Litt.D.	Librarian and director of the Library School of the University of Illinois
Jean Zay	LL.D.	Minister of National Education of France

=== 1940s ===
1940

Recipient	Degree or Honor	Notes
Pelham St. George Bissell	University Medal for Excellence	A.B. 1909; A.M. 1910; LL.B 1912. President Justice of the Municipal Court, New York.
Francis Stuart Chapin	University Medal for Excellence	B.S. 1909; A.M. 1910; Ph.D. 1911. Professor of Sociology in the University of Minnesota.
Elbridge Colby	University Medal for Excellence	A.B. 1912; A.M. 1913; Ph.D. 1922. Major of Infantry at the Army War College at Washington, D.C.
Harris Kennedy Masters	University Medal for Excellence	E.M. 1894. Recognized authority on minerals and the metal industry; devoted son of Alma Mater.
Alfred Einstein Cohn	Sc.D.	Member of the Rockefeller Institute for Medical Research
Harvey nathaniel Davis	Sc.D.	President of the Stevens Institute of Technology
Cupertino Del Campo	LL.D.	President of the Instituto Cultural Argentino-Borte-Americano, Buenos Aires
Sidney Bradshaw Fay	Litt.D.	Professor of History at Harvard University
Ross Granville Harrison	Sc.D.	Sterling Professor of Biology at Yale University
William Otis Hotchkiss	Sc.D.	President of Rensselaer Polytechnic Institute
Charles Kenneth Leith	Sc.D.	Professor of Geology at the University of Wisconsin
Marquess of Lothian	LL.D.	British Ambassador to the United States
Harry Miller Lydenberg	Litt.D.	Director of the New York Public Library
Arthur Hastings Merritt	Sc.D.	President of the American Dental Association
Stanley Forman Reed	LL.D.	Justice of the Supreme Court of the United States
Robert Lawrence Stearns	LL.D.	President of the University of Colorado
Carl Van Doren	Litt.D.	Man of Letters
Béla Barthók (Bartok)	Mus.D.	Professor at the Royal Hungarian Academy of Music
Cecil Thomas Carr	LL.D.	Of the Inner Temple
Karl Taylor Compton	Sc.D.	President of the Massachusetts Institute of Technology
Paul Hazard	Litt.D.	Man of letters

1941

Recipient	Degree or Honor	Notes
William Bennett Bizzell	University Medal for Excellence	Ph.D. 1921. President of the University of Oklahoma.
G. Forrest Butterworth Jr.	University Medal for Excellence	A.B. 1913; LL.B. 1916. Chancellor of the Diocese of New York.
Frederic Rene Coudert Jr.	University Medal for Excellence	A.B. 1918; LL.B. 1922. Member of the Senate of the State of New York.
Huger Elliott	University Medal for Excellence	B.S. in architecture, 1900. Director of education work at the Metropolitan Museum of Art.
John Howard Johnson	University Medal for Excellence	A.B. 1920. A.M. 1921. Rector of St. Martin's Episcopal Church in Harlem.
Arthur Vincent McDermott	University Medal for Excellence	Class of 1910, Columbia College. Director of Selective Service for the City of New York and First Deputy Comptroller of the City.
William Bacon Pettus	University Medal for Excellence	A.B. 1904. President of the College of Chinese Studies, Peiping, China.
Otto David Tolischus	University Medal for Excellence	B.Litt. 1916. Correspondent of the New York Times in Europe and Asia.
Viscount (formerly Frederick Lindley Wood) Halifax	LL.D.	Chancellor of the University of Oxford; British Ambassador in Washington
Othmar Hermann Ammann	Sc.D.	Former Chief Engineer, Port of New York Authority
The Honorable Oswaldo Aranha	LL.D.	Minister of Foreign Affairs of the United States of Brazil (Represented by Ambassador)
The Very Reverend James Pernette DeWolfe	S.T.D.	Dean of the Cathedral of St. John the Divine
Sir Lyman Poore Duff	LL.D.	Privy Councilor and Knight; Chief Justice of the Supreme Court of the Dominion of Canada
The Reverend Robert Ignatius Gannon	Litt.D.	President of Fordham University
Anne O'Hare McCormick	Litt.D.	Member of the Eidtorial Staff of the New York Times
Frank Ross McCoy	LL.D.	Major General of the Army of the United States, Retired
Geoffrey Parsons	Litt.D.	Chief Editorial Writer of the New York Herald Tribune
The Honorable Enrique Ruiz-Guiñazú	LL.D.	Minister of Foreign Affairs of the Argentine Republic (Represented by Ambassador)
Clark Howell Woodward	LL.D.	Rear Admiral of the United States Navy, Retired

1942

Recipient	Degree or Honor	Notes
George Raimes Beach	University Medal for Excellence	LL.B. 1897. Member of the Bar of the State of New Jersey.
Alice Henrietta Gregg	University Medal for Excellence	B.S. 1921; A.M. 1928. Religious Education Secretary for the Anglican Communion in China.
Frank Smithwick Hogan	University Medal for Excellence	A.B. 1924; LL.B. 1928. District Attorney of the County of New York.
Henry Beetle Hough	University Medal for Excellence	B.Litt. 1918. Author of Cuntry Editor.
Louis Vernon Ledoux	University Medal for Excellence	A.B. 1902. Student and author who writes with special authority on the institutions and art of Japan.
Joseph Daniel McGoldrick	University Medal for Excellence	A.B. 1922; A.M. 1923; Ph.D. 1931. Comptroller of the City of New York.
Edgar Joshua Nathan Jr.	University Medal for Excellence	LL.B. 1916. President of the Borough of Manhattan.
Lyman Rhoades	University Medal for Excellence	A.B. 1902. Vice President of the Chase National Bank.
H.M., George II King of the Hellenes	LL.D.	(Special University Convocation)
John Marshall Chew	S.T.D.	Rector of the Church of the Good Shepard, Newburgh, New York
John Crocker	Litt.D.	Headmaster of the Groton School
John Wesley Dafoe	Litt.D.	Journalist and Man of Letters
James Byron Drew	LL.D.	Justice of the Supreme Court of the State of Pennsylvania
Hugh Aloysius Drum	LL.D.	Lieutenant General, United States Army
Jekuthiel Ginsburg	Sc.D.	Head of the Department of Mathematics at Yeshiva College
Alice Duer Miller	Litt.D.	Author and Poet
Samuel Eliot Morison	Litt.D.	Professor of History and Senior Fellow of the Society of Fellows at Harvard University
Derwyn Trevor Owen	S.T.D.	Archbishop of Toronto; Primate of the Church of England in Canada
Ezequiel Padilla	LL.D.	Secretary of Foreign Affairs of Mexico
Alfred Newton Richards	Sc.D.	Professor of Pharmacology at the University of Pennsylvania
James Wolcott Wadsworth Jr.	LL.D.	Representative in Congress from New York State
Robert Runnels Williams	Sc.D.	Chemical Director of the Bell Telephone Laboratories of New York
Roger John Williams	Sc.D.	Professor of Chemistry at the University of Texas
Manuel Prado Ugarteche	LL.D.	President of the Republic of Peru. Degree awarded in camera
Carlos Arroyo Del Rio	LL.D.	President of Ecuador (Special University Convocation)
Dr. Carlos Arroyo Del Rio	LL.D.	President of Ecuador (Special University Convocation)

1943

Recipient	Degree or Honor	Notes
Miles Lanier Colean	University Medal for Excellence	A.B. 1922. Able and effective public servant in planning and building.
Gustav Egloff	University Medal for Excellence	A.M 1913; Ph.D. 1915. Researcher in the petroleum industry.
John Warren Hill	University Medal for Excellence	A.B. 1911; LL.B. 1914. Presiding Justice of the Domestic Relations Court
William Ogden Wiley	University Medal for Excellence	A.B. 1882; A.M. 1887. Publisher.
William Beveridge	LL.D.	Master of University College, Oxford
Harold Beresford Butler	LL.D.	Head of the International Labor Office at Geneva
John van Nostrand Dorr	Sc.D.	Engineer
Harry Emerson Fosdick	S.T.D.	Pastor of Riverside Church
Charles Franklin Kettering	Sc.D.	Engineer
William Lyon Mackenzie King	LL.D.	Prime Minister of Canada
William Frederick Lamb	Litt.D.	Architect
William Church Osborn	LL.D.	President of the Metropolitan Museum of Art
Julia Marlowe Sothern	Litt.D.	Actress
Hatton William Sumners	LL.D.	Representative in Congress from the State of Texas
Enrique Peñaranda	LL.D.	(Special University Convocation)

1944

Recipient	Degree or Honor	Notes
Clarence Orion Cheney	University Medal for Excellence	A.B. 1908. M.D. 1911. Director of the New York Hospital, Westchester Division.
Condict Walker Cutler Jr.	University Medal for Excellence	B.S. 1910; M.D. 1912. Lieutenant Colonel in the Medical Corps of the United States Army in active service.
Chester Alan Fulton	University Medal for Excellence	E.M. 1906. President of the American Institute of Mining and Metallurgical Engineers.
James Taylor Kemp	University Medal for Excellence	B.S. 1912; Met.E. 1916. Metallurgist. Member of the Mission for Economic Affairs.
Paul Evans Lockwood	University Medal for Excellence	A.B. 1923. Private secretary to the Governor of New York State.
Abbot Low Moffat	University Medal for Excellence	LL.B. 1926. Lawyer; now serving with the Office of Foreign Economic Coordination in Washington.
Francis Ellis Rivers	University Medal for Excellence	LL.B. 1922. Justice of the City Court.
Cyril Forster Garbett	LL.D.	Lord Archbishop of York, Primate of England and Metropolitan (Special University Convocation)
Warren Robinson Austin	LL.D.	United States Senator from Vermont
Charles Austin Beard	Litt.D.	Historian and Political Scientist
Lyman James Briggs	Sc.D.	Physicist
Augustus Noble Hand	LL.D.	Judge of the United States Circuit Court of Appeals
Te-Pang Hou	Sc.D.	Chemist and Engineer
Charles Merz	Litt.D.	Editor in Chief of the New York Times
Francis Joseph Spellman	LL.D.	Archbishop of New York.
Walter Hubert Baddeley	S.T.D.	Anglican Bishop of Melanesia (Special University Convocation)

1945

Recipient	Degree or Honor	Notes
Ralph Stanton Barnaby	University Medal for Excellence	M.E. 1915. Captain in the U.S. Navy
William Fondiller	University Medal for Excellence	E.E. 1909; A.M. 1913. Executive Vice President of the Bell Laboratories.
Russell Justin Hill	University Medal for Excellence	A.B. 1939. War correspondent of the New York Herald Tribune.
Amy Loveman	University Medal for Excellence	A.B. Barnard, 1901. An editor of the Saturday Review of Literature.
Herbert Lionel Matthews	University Medal for Excellence	A.B. 1922. Journalist on the staff of the New York Times.
Rhoda Jameson Milliken	University Medal for Excellence	A.B. Barnard, 1918. Chief of the Women's Bureau of the Metropolitan Police Department at Washington, D.C.
Paul Austin Wolfe	S.T.D.	Pastor of the Brick Presbyterian Church
Edwin Joseph Cohn	Sc.D.	Professor of Biological Chemistry at the Medical School of Harvard University
Kenneth Wallace Colegrove	Litt.D.	Professor of Political Science at Northwestern University.
Douglas Southall Freeman	Litt.D.	Editor of the News Leader, Richmond, Virginia
Herbert Spencer Gasser	Sc.D.	Director of Rockefeller Institute
Walter Franklin George	LL.D.	United States Senator from Georgia
George Mead Jr.	Mus.D.	Organist and Director of Music, Trinity Church
Edward Reilly Stettinius Jr.	LL.D.	Secretary of State of the United States. In absentia
Thomas Day Thacher	LL.D.	Judge of the Court of Appeals of New York State
Paul Austin Wolfe	S.T.D.	Pastor of the Brick Presbyterian Church
Juan Antonio Rios	LL.D.	President of the Republic of Chile

1946

Recipient	Degree or Honor	Notes
Donald Armstrong	University Medal for Excellence	A.B. 1909; A.M. 1910
Robert Erskine Campbell	University Medal for Excellence	A.B. 1906
Edward Mead Earle	University Medal for Excellence	B.S. 1917; A.M. 1918
Knowlton Durham	University Medal for Excellence	A.B. 1901; A.M. 1902; LL.B. 1905
Willet Lawrence Eccles	University Medal for Excellence	A.B. 1923; A.M. 1925; Ph.D. 1928
Reginald James Seymour Pigott	University Medal for Excellence	Mech.E. 1906
Winthrop Williams Aldrich	LL.D.	Financier
Maxwell Anderson	Litt.D.	Teacher; Journalist; Dramatist
Francis Gordon Caffey	LL.D.	Judge of the Southern District of New York
Babette Deutsch	Litt.D.	Author and Poet
Enrico Fermi	Sc.D.	Scientist; Winner of the Nobel Prize for the discovery of nuclear reactions
Frank Sutliff Hackett	Litt.D.	Founder and Headmaster, Riverdale Country School
Howard Hanson	Mus.D.	Composer
Poling Chang	Litt.D.	President of Nanking University
John Kelvey Richards Jr.	Sc.D.	Commodore, United States Navy
Timothy Edward Shea	Sc.D.	Engineer
Harold Clayton Urey	Sc.D.	Chemist
Nicholai Velimirovich	S.T.D.	Bishop of Ochrida and Zicha of the Serbian Orthodox Church
Winston Leonard Spencer Churchill, O.M.	LL.D.	Member of British Parliament
Geoffrey Francis Fisher	LL.D.	Archbishop of Canterbury; Primate of All England and Metropolitan

1947

Recipient	Degree or Honor	Notes
Albert Herman Case	University Medal for Excellence	E.M. 1905
Calvin Hadden	University Medal for Excellence	C.E. 1912
William Anthony Kimbel	University Medal for Excellence	B.S. 1916
David Barnard Steinman	University Medal for Excellence	C.E. 1909; A.M. 1909; Ph.D. 1911
Henry Harley Arnold	LL.D.	General, United States Army. Degree awarded in absentia
Dwight David Eisenhower	LL.D.	General and Chief of Staff, United States Army
William Frederick Halsey	LL.D.	Fleet Admiral, United States Navy
Lewis Blane Hershey	LL.D.	Director of the Selective Service System
Ernest Joseph King	LL.D.	Commander in Chief of the United States Fleet; Chief of Naval Operation
Norman Thomas Kirk	LL.D.	Surgeon General, United States Army
Emory Scott Land	LL.D.	Vice Admiral, United States Navy; Chairman of the United States Maritime Commission; Administrator of the War Shipping Administration
Douglas MacArthur	LL.D.	General, United States Army; Commanding General, Armed forces in the Pacific. Degree awarded in absentia
George Catlett Marshall	LL.D.	General, United States Army; Secretary of State
Chester William Nimitz	LL.D.	Fleet Admiral, United States Navy
Alexander Archer Vandergrift	LL.D.	General, United States Marine Corps
Barnard Mannes Baruch	LL.D.	Man of Affairs
Vannevar Bush	Sc.D.	President of the Carnegie Institution of Washington; Chairman of the Joint Research and Development Board of the Army and Navy
Louis Shattuck Cates	Sc.D.	Mining Engineer
James Vincent Forrestal	LL.D.	Secretray of the Navy
Charles Spurgeon Johnson	Litt.D.	President of Fisk University
Robert McLean	Litt.D.	Publisher; President of the Associated Press
Harvey Seely Mudd	Sc.D.	Mining Engineer
Robert Porter Patterson	LL.D.	Secretary of War
Bernard Lloyd Shientag	LL.D.	Justice of the Supreme Court of New York State
Henry Lewis Stimson	LL.D.	Secretary of State and of War of the United States
John William Charles Wand	S.T.D.	Lord Bishop of London
William Joseph Donovan	LL.D.	Major General, United States Army; Wartime Head of the Office of Strategic Services
Miguel Aleman	LL.D.	President of the Republic of Mexico
Thomas Edmund Dewey	LL.D.	Governor of the State of New York

1948

Recipient	Degree or Honor	Notes
Richard Erwin Dougherty	University Medal for Excellence	C.E. 1901
William Comings White	University Medal for Excellence	E.E. 1912
Philip Sporn	University Medal for Excellence	E.E. 1917
Melville Henry Cane	University Medal for Excellence	A.B. 1900; LL.B. 1903
Romulo Gallegos	LL.D.	President of the United States of Venezuela
Oliver Ellsworth Buckley	LL.D.	President of Bell Telephone Laboratories
James Francis Byrnes	LL.D.	Statesman
Colgate Whitehead Darden Jr.	LL.D.	President of the University of Virginia
Manuel Gamio	Litt.D.	Director of the Instituto Indigenieta Interamericano
Paul Hindemith	Mus.D.	Professor of the Theory of Music and Associate Fellow of Jonathan Edwards College, Yale University
William Walter Pettit	Litt.D.	Former Dean of the New York School of Social Work
Henry Knox Sherrill	S.T.D.	Presiding Bishop of the Protestant Episcopal Church
Arthur Hendrick Vandenberg	LL.D.	United States Senator from Michigan

1949

Recipient	Degree or Honor	Notes
Milton Longacre Cornell	University Medal for Excellence	C.E. 1905
Oscar Hammerstein II	University Medal for Excellence	A.B. 1916
John Marshall Lowrie	University Medal for Excellence	LL.B. 1912
Richard Rodgers	University Medal for Excellence	Class of 1923, Columbia College
Middleton Beaman	LL.D.	Legislative Counsel for the House of Representatives (as of June 1, 1948)
Omar Nelson Bradley	LL.D.	General and Chief of Staff, United States Army (voted in March, 1948)
Lucius DuBignon Clay	LL.D.	General, United States Army (voted in March, 1947)
Raymond Blaine Fosdick	LL.D.	Lawyer (voted in March 1948)
Oliver Shewell Franks	LL.D.	Ambassador of Great Britain to the United States
Paul Klapper	LL.D.	President Emeritus of Queens College
Helen Hayes MacArthur	Litt.D.	Actress
Herman Joseph Muller	Sc.D.	Professor of Zoology at Indiana University
Helen Rogers Reid	Litt.D.	Publisher
Arnold Joseph Toynbee	Litt.D.	Historian (voted in March 1948)
Charles Erwin Wilson	Sc.D.	Industrialist
Jawaharlal Nehru	LL.D.	Prime Minister of India

=== 1950s ===
1950

Recipient	Degree or Honor	Notes
Donald Clifford Brace	University Medal for Excellence	A.B. 1904
Thomas Hamilton Chilton	University Medal for Excellence	Chem.E. 1922
Horace Reynolds Graham	University Medal for Excellence	E.M. 1908
Milton C. Whitaker	University Medal for Excellence	Professor in Columbia University, 1910–1917
Gabriel Gonzalez Videla	LL.D.	President of the Republic of Chile
Ralph Johnson Bunche	LL.D.	Director of the Division of Trusteeship of the United Nations
Charles Proctor Cooper	Sc.D.	President of the Presbyterian Hospital
Charles Kendall Gilbert	S.T.D.	Bishop of New York
Camille Gutt	LL.D.	Chairman of the Board of the International Monetary Fund
Paul Gray Hoffman	LL.D.	Economic Cooperation Administrator
Albert Charles Jacobs	LL.D.	Chancellor of the University of Denver
Trygve Halvdan Lie	LL.D.	Secretary General of the UN; Legal advisor to the Norwegian Labor Party
Robert Abercrombie Lovett	LL.D.	Former Under Secretary of State
Robert James McCracken	S.T.D.	Pastor of the Riverside Church
Harold Raymond Medina	LL.D.	Judge of the United States District Court
John Fairfield Thompson	Sc.D.	Industrialist
Eleanore Robson Belmont	Litt.D.	Actress, Philanthropist and Social Worker
Liaquat Ali Khan	LL.D.	Prime Minister of Pakistan

1951

Recipient	Degree or Honor	Notes
Dorothy Fosdick	University Medal for Excellence	Ph.D. 1939
Julian Seymour Schwinger	University Medal for Excellence	A.B. 1936; Ph.D. 1939
Vincent Auriol	LL.D.	President of the French Republic
Madeleine Beer Borg	L.H.D.	Worker in Philanthropy
Edward Calvin Kendall	Sc.D.	Biochemist
Henry Krumb	Sc.D.	Consulting and Mining Engineer
Arthur Oncken Lovejoy	Litt.D.	Philosopher
Walter Winne Stewart	LL.D.	Economist
Iphingene Ochs Sulzberger	LL.D.	Outstanding Public Citizen
Helen Brook Taussig	Sc.D.	Pediatrician
Charles Edward Wilson	LL.D.	Director of Defense Mobilization
Lewis Williams Douglas	LL.D.	Former United States Ambassador to Great Britain
Alberto Gainza Paz	LL.D.	Journalist

1952

Recipient	Degree or Honor	Notes
Herman Wouk	University Medal for Excellence	A.B. 1934. Author.
Thomas Scherman	University Medal for Excellence	A.B. 1937. Musician.
Juliana	LL.D.	Queen of the Netherlands
Anthony Eden	LL.D.	British Secretary of State for Foreign Affairs
Bhimrao Ramji Ambedkar	LL.D.	Educator and Statesman
Stephen Fielding Bayne Jr.	S.T.D.	Bishop of Olympia
Hugh Hammond Bennett	Sc.D.	Soil Conservationist
Frank Smithwick Hogan	LL.D.	District Attorney of New York County
Daniel Mornet	Litt.D.	Literary Historian and Critic
Robert Moses	LL.D.	Distinguished Public Servant
Lester Bowles Pearson	LL.D.	Canadian Secretary of State for External Affairs
Joseph Pulitzer	LL.D.	Publisher
Anna Marie Rosenberg	L.H.D.	Assistant Secretary of Defense of Hungary
Allan Sproul	LL.D.	Banker
Wallace Stevens	Litt.D.	Poet
Joao Neves Da Fontoura	LL.D.	Minister of Foreign Affairs, Brazil. Degree Awarded in camera

1953

Recipient	Degree or Honor	Notes
Milton Katims	University Medal for Excellence	A.B. 1930. Musician.
Grayson Lewis Kirk	LL.D.	Then Vice President and Provost of the University. Degree Awarded in camera
John William Davis	LL.D.	Congressman from West Virginia; Solicitor General; United States Ambassador to Great Britain
Luther Harris Evans	LL.D.	Librarian of Congress
Crawford Hallock Greenewalt	LL.D.	Industrial Chemist
Alfred Louis Kroeber	L.H.D.	Anthropologist
Frank Charles Laubach	L.H.D.	Missionary and Educator
John Jay McCloy	LL.D.	Former United States High Commissioner for Germany
Henry Allen Moe	LL.D.	Secretary General of the John Simon Guggenheim Memorial Foundation
Jean Monnet	LL.D.	President of the High Authority of the European Coal-Steel Community
David Bernard Steinman	Sc.D.	Bridge Engineer
Luis Antonio Eguiguren	LL.D.	Chief Justice of the Republic of Peru
King of the Hellenes Paul	L.H.D.	
William Edward Schneck Griswold	LL.D.	Lawyer and Business Executive
Leonard Andrew Scheele	Sc.D.	Surgeon General of the United States

1954

Recipient	Degree or Honor	Notes
Syngman Rhee	LL.D.	President of the Republic of Korea
Celal Bayar	LL.D.	President of the Republic of Turkey (Bicentennial Convocation)
Roy Blough	L.H.D.	Principal Director Department of Economic Affairs at the United Nations (Bicentennial Convocation I)
Thomas Henry Briggs	L.H.D.	Professor Emeritus of Education in Columbia University (Bicentennial Convocation I)
Sevellon Ledyard Brown	Litt.D.	Publisher of the Providence Journal and Evening Bulletin (Bicentennial Convocation I)
Harry James Carman	LL.D.	Dean Emeritus of Columbia College (Bicentennial Convocation I)
Sir Alexander Morris Carr-Saunders	LL.D.	Director of the London School of Economics (Bicentennial Convocation I)
Louis Chevalier	L.H.D.	Professor of the History of the Social Structure of Paris, in the College de France (Bicentennial Convocation I)
Sir George Norman Clark	Litt.D.	Provost of Oriel College in Oxford University (Bicentennial Convocation I)
Frederic René Coudert	LL.D.	Lawyer; Trustee of Columbia University (Bicentennial Convocation I)
Howard Stix Cullman	LL.D.	Commissioner of the Port of the New York Authority (Bicentennial Convocation I)
Haven Emerson	Sc.D.	Professor Emeritus of Public Health Administration in Columbia University (Bicentennial Convocation I)
James Kip Finch	Sc.D.	Dean Emeritus of the Faculty of Engineering in Columbia University (Bicentennial Convocation I)
Philip Sargant Florence	L.H.D.	Dean of the Faculties of Commerce and Social Science in Birmingham University (Bicentennial Convocation I)
Joseph Folliet	L.H.D.	Director of the Social Institute in the Facultes Catholiques de Lyon (Bicentennial Convocation I)
George Barry Ford	L.H.D.	Pastor of Corpus Christi Church, New York City (Bicentennial Convocation I)
Paul Abraham Freund	LL.D.	Charles Stebbins Fairchild Professor of Law in Harvard University (Bicentennial Convocation I)
Carl Joachim Friedrich	L.H.D.	Professor of Government in Harvard University (Bicentennial Convocation I)
John Merriman Gaus	L.H.D.	Professor of Government in Harvard University (Bicentennial Convocation I)
Arthur Lehman Goodhart	LL.D.	Master of University College in Oxford University (Bicentennial Convocation I)
Luther Halsey Gulick	LL.D.	President of the Institute of Public Administration (Bicentennial Convocation I)
Saba Habachy	LL.D.	Attorney and Professor of Law in Fuad University (Bicentennial Convocation I)
Oscar Hammerstein 2nd	Litt.D.	Librettist (Bicentennial Convocation I)
Henry Melvin Hart Jr.	LL.D.	Professor of Law in Harvard University (Bicentennial Convocation I)
Theresa Helburn	L.H.D.	Co-director of the Theatre Guild (Bicentennial Convocation I)
David Melville Heyman	L.H.D.	President of the New York Fund (Bicentennial Convocation I)
Archibald Vivian Hill	Sc.D.	Honorary Professor of Physiology in University College, London (Bicentennial Convocation I)
Rabbi Isidor B. Hoffman	L.H.D.	Counselor to Jewish students in Columbia University (Bicentennial Convocation I)
Arthur Norman Holcombe	L.H.D.	Professor of Government in Harvard University (Bicentennial Convocation I)
Myres Smith McDougal	L.H.D.	Professor of Law in Yale University (Bicentennial Convocation I)
James Howard McGregor	Sc.D.	William E. Dodge Jr. Professor of Applied Christianity, in Union Theological Seminary (Bicentennial Convocation I)
Reinhold Niebuhr	S.T.D.	Author (Bicentennial Convocation I)
Stuart Piggott	L.H.D.	Abercromby Professor of Prehistoric Archaeology in the University of Edinburgh (Bicentennial Convocation I)
Ivan Cleaveland Rand	LL.D.	Justice of the Supreme Court of Canada (Bicentennial Convocation I)
Harold Leslie Reeve	L.H.D.	Author and Lawyer (Bicentennial Convocation I)
Richard Rodgers	Mus.D.	Composer (Bicentennial Convocation I)
George Adolphe Salles	L.H.D.	Director of The Louvre (Bicentennial Convocation I)
Sir George Sansom	LL.D.	Professor Emeritus of Japanese in Columbia University (Bicentennial Convocation I)
William Schuman	Mus.D.	President of the Juilliard School of Music (Bicentennial Convocation I)
Angelo Piero Sereni	LL.D.	Professor of International Law in the University of Ferrara (Bicentennial Convocation I)
Sir Hartley William Shawcross	LL.D.	President of the Board of Trade and Attorney General in the Labour Government (Bicentennial Convocation I)
Anson Phelps Stokes Jr.	S.T.D.	Rector of St. Bartholomew's Church, New York City (Bicentennial Convocation I)
Ingvar Svennilson	L.H.D.	Professor of Political Economy in the University of Stockholm (Bicentennial Convocation I)
Francis Henry Taylor	L.H.D.	Director of the Metropolitan Museum of Art (Bicentennial Convocation I)
Thurman William Van Metre	L.H.D.	Professor Emeritus of Transportation in Columbia University (Bicentennial Convocation I)
Kenneth Clinton Wheare	L.H.D.	Gladstone Professor of Government and Public Administration, in Oxford University (Bicentennial Convocation I)
William P.G. Alexander	L.H.D.	Secretary of the Association of Education Committees in Great Britain (Special Bicentennial Convocation honoring National Education Association and leaders in public education)
Harvie Branscomb	LL.D.	Chancellor of Vanderbilt University (Special Bicentennial Convocation honoring National Education Association and leaders in public education)
Lyman Lloyd Bryson	L.H.D.	Professor Emeritus of Education in Columbia University (Special Bicentennial Convocation honoring National Education Association and leaders in public education)
William George Carr	L.H.D.	Executive Secretary of the National Association of the United States (Special Bicentennial Convocation honoring National Education Association and leaders in public education)
Cleaveland E. Dodge	LL.D.	Chairman of the Trustees of Teachers College; (Special Bicentennial Convocation honoring National Education Association and leaders in public education)
Harry David Gideonse	LL.D.	President of Brooklyn College of the College of the City of New York (Special Bicentennial Convocation honoring National Education Association and leaders in public education)
Henry Harrington Hill	L.H.D.	President of George Peabody College for Teachers (Second Bicentennial Convocation honoring National Education Association and leaders in public education)
Mohammed Fadhil Jamali	LL.D.	Minister of Foreign Affairs and Acting Minister of Education in Iraq (Special Bicentennial Convocation honoring National Education Association and leaders in public education)
William Jansen	L.H.D.	Superintendent of Schools of the City of New York (Special Bicentennial Convocation honoring National Education Association and leaders in public education)
Frederick Ernest Johnson	L.H.D.	Professor Emeritus of Education in Columbia University (Special Bicentennial Convocation honoring National Education Association and leaders in public education)
John Paul Leonard	L.H.D.	President of San Francisco State College (Special Bicentennial Convocation honoring National Education Association and leaders in public education)
John Platt Myers	LL.D.	Chancellor of the Board of Regents of the University of the State of New York (Special Bicentennial Convocation honoring National Education Association and leaders in public education)
Arthur Wilson Page	LL.D.	Trustee of Teachers College (Special Bicentennial Convocation honoring National Education Association and leaders in public education)
George Nauman Shuster	LL.D.	President of Hunter College of the College of the City of New York (Special Bicentennial Convocation honoring National Education Association and leaders in public education)
Isabel Maitland Stewart	L.H.D.	Professor Emeritus of Nursing Education in Columbia University (Special Bicentennial Convocation honoring National Education Association and leaders in public education)
John Jacob Theobald	LL.D.	President of Queens College of The College of the City of New York (Special Bicentennial Convocation honoring National Education Association and leaders in public education)
Pearl Anderson Wanamaker	L.H.D.	State Superintendent of Public Instruction of the State of Washington (Special Bicentennial Convocation honoring National Education Association and leaders in public education)
Lewis Albert Wilson	LL.D.	President of the University of the State of New York and Commissioner of Education (Special Bicentennial Convocation honoring National Education Association and leaders in public education)
Buell Gordon Gallagher	LL.D.	President of The City College of The College of the City of New York (Special Bicentennial Convocation honoring National Education Association and leaders in public education)
Ordway Tead	L.H.D.	Author and Educator (Special Bicentennial Convocation honoring National Education Association and leaders in public education)
Shelton Hale Bishop	S.T.D.	Rector of Saint Philip's Church New York City (Bicentennial Convocation II)
Eugene Robert Black	LL.D.	President of the International Bank for Reconstruction and Development (Bicentennial Convocation II)
Gerty Theresa Cori	Sc.D.	Professor of Biological Chemistry in Washington University, St. Louis (Bicentennial Convocation II)
Joseph Stancliffe Davis	L.H.D.	Director Emeritus of the Food Research Institute in Stanford University (Bicentennial Convocation II)
John Foster Dulles	LL.D.	The Secretary of State (Bicentennial Convocation II)
Edward M. Earle	L.H.D.	Professor in the School of Historical Studies Institute for Advanced Study (Bicentennial Convocation II)
Lester Blackwell Granger	L.H.D.	Executive Director of the National Urban League (Bicentennial Convocation II)
Alfred Whitney Griswold	LL.D.	President of Yale University (Bicentennial Convocation II)
Erwin Nathaniel Griswold	LL.D.	Dean of the Law School in Harvard University (Bicentennial Convocation II)
William Averill Harriman	LL.D.	Statesman and Public Servant (Bicentennial Convocation II)
Henry Townley Heald	LL.D.	Chancellor of New York University (Bicentennial Convocation II)
Oveta Culp Hobby	LL.D.	The Secretary of Health, Education, and Welfare (Bicentennial Convocation II)
Barbara Ward Jackson	L.H.D.	Author and Economist (Bicentennial Convocation II)
Lewis Webster Jones	LL.D.	President of Rutgers University (Bicentennial Convocation II)
Willard Vinton King	L.H.D.	Trustee Emeritus of Columbia University (Bicentennial Convocation II)
Shinzo Koizumi	L.H.D.	Permanent Advisor to the Peers School, Tokyo (Bicentennial Convocation II)
Simon Smith Kuznets	L.H.D.	Professor of Economic Statistics in the University of Pennsylvania (Bicentennial Convocation II)
Pierre Laroque	LL.D.	Conseiller d'Etat, France (Bicentennial Convocation II)
William Arthur Lewis	L.H.D.	Stanley Jevons Professor of Political Economy in the University of Manchester (Bicentennial Convocation II)
Vincent Christopher MacDonald	LL.D.	Justice of the Supreme Court of Nova Scotia (Bicentennial Convocation II)
Gunner Carl Myrdal	L.H.D.	Executive Secretary of the United Nations Economic Commission for Europe (Bicentennial Convocation II)
Bertil Ohlin	L.H.D.	Professor of Economics in the Stockholm School of Business (Bicentennial Convocation II)
Raul Prebisch	LL.D.	Executive Secretary of the Economic Commission for Latin America (Bicentennial Convocation II)
Nathan Marsh Pusey	LL.D.	President of Harvard University (Bicentennial Convocation II)
Lionel Charles Robbins	L.H.D.	Professor of Economics in the London School of Economics and Political Science (Bicentennial Convocation II)
Sir Dennis Holme Robertson	L.H.D.	Professor of Political Economy in Cambridge University (Bicentennial Convocation II)
Wilhelm Roepke	L.H.D.	Professor in the Graduate Institute of International Studies University of Geneva (Bicentennial Convocation II)
Ralph Washington Sockman	S.T.D.	Minister of Christ Church New York City (Bicentennial Convocation II)
Lewis Lichenstein Strauss	LL.D.	Chairman of the United States Atomic Energy Commission (Bicentennial Convocation II)
Wesley Alba Sturges	LL.D.	Dean of the Law School in Yale University (Bicentennial Convocation II)
Thomas Walter Swan	LL.D.	Judge of the United States State Court of Appeals, Second Circuit (Bicentennial Convocation II)
James Alward Van Fleet	LL.D.	General of the United States Army, Retired (Bicentennial Convocation II)
Jacob Viner	L.H.D.	Walker Professor of Economics in the Institute for Advanced Study (Bicentennial Convocation II)
Barbara Brances Wootton	L.H.D.	Nuffield Research Fellow in Bedford College University of London (Bicentennial Convocation II)
Haile Selassie I	LL.D.	Emperor of Ethiopia (Bicentennial Convocation II) Degree awarded in camera
Field Marshal Viscount Montgomery of Alamein	LL.D.	(Bicentennial Convocation)
Shigeru Yoshida	LL.D.	Prime Minister of Japan (Bicentennial Convocation)
Mohammed Ali	LL.D.	Prime Minister of Pakistan (Bicentennial Convocation)
Konrad Adenauer	LL.D.	Chancellor of the Federal Republic of Germany. (Bicentennial Convocation III)
Felice Battaglia	LL.D.	Rector of the University of Bologna (Bicentennial Convocation III)
James Phinney Baxter, III	LL.D.	President of Williams College (Bicentennial Convocation III)
Eivind Josef Berggrav	S.T.D.	Bishop of Oslo and Primate of Norway, 1937-1951 (Bicentennial Convocation III)
Margarete Bieber	Litt.D.	Classicist and Archaeologist (Bicentennial Convocation III)
Niels Henrik David Bohr	Sc.D.	Professor of Theoretical Physics in Copenhagen University (Bicentennial Convocation III)
Victor Lloyd Butterfield	LL.D.	President of Wesleyan University (Bicentennial Convocation III)
John Maurice Clark	LL.D.	John Bates Clark Professor Emeritus of Political Economy in Columbia University (Bicentennial Convocation III)
Sir Kenneth McKenzie Clark	Litt.D.	Chairman of the Arts Council of Great Britain (Bicentennial Convocation III)
Charles Woolsey Cole	LL.D.	President of Amherst College (Bicentennial Convocation III)
John Sloan Dickey	LL.D.	President of Dartmouth College (Bicentennial Convocation III)
Alphonse Raymond Dochez	Sc.D.	John E. Borne Professor Emeritus of Medical and Surgical Research in Columbia University (Bicentennial Convocation III)
Pierre Donzelot	L.H.D.	Permanent Representative of French Universities in the United States (Bicentennial Convocation III)
Noel Thomas Dowling	LL.D.	Harlan Fiske Stone Professor Emeritus of Constitutional Law in Columbia University (Bicentennial Convocation III)
Her Majesty, The Queen Mother Elizabeth (Queen)	LL.D.	(Bicentennial Convocation III.)
Gilberto De Mello Freyre	Litt.D.	Brazilian Social Anthropologist and Historian (Bicentennial Convocation III)
Etienne Henri Gilson	Litt.D.	Fellow of the Académie Française and Professor in the University of Toronto (Bicentennial Convocation III)
Dag Hjalmar Agne Carl Hammarskjold	LL.D.	Secretary General of the United Nations (Bicentennial Convocation III)
Arthur Warren Hixson	Sc.D.	Professor Emeritus of Chemical Engineering in Columbia University (Bicentennial Convocation III)
Bernardo Alberto Houssay	Sc.D.	President of the Argentine Association for the Advancement of Science (Bicentennial Convocation III)
Julian Sorell Huxley	Sc.D.	Author and Biologist (Bicentennial Convocation III)
Edward Kasner	Sc.D.	Adrain Professor Emeritus of Mathematics in Columbia University (Bicentennial Convocation III)
Frank Hyneman Knight	L.H.D.	Professor of Economics in the University of Chicago (Bicentennial Convocation III)
Joseph Wood Krutch	Litt.D.	Brander Matthews Professor of Dramatic Literature in Columbia University, 1937-1953 (Bicentennial Convocation III)
Sir Richard Winn Livingstone	Litt.D.	British Classicist and Educator (Bicentennial Convocation III)
Alberto Lleras Camargo	LL.D.	Secretary General of the Organization of American States, 1948-1954 (Bicentennial Convocation III)
Archibald MacLeish	Litt.D.	Boylston Professor of Rhetoric and Oratory in Harvard University (Bicentennial Convocation III)
Charles Habib Malik	LL.D.	Ambassador of Lebanon to the United States (Bicentennial Convocation III)
Gabriela Mistral	Litt.D.	Chilean Poetess and Diplomat (Bicentennial Convocation III)
Fernando Ortiz	L.H.D.	Anthropologist and Director of Revista Bimestre Cubana (Bicentennial Convocation III)
Richard Roy Belden Powell	LL.D.	Dwight Professor of Law and Director of the Bicentennial of Columbia University (Bicentennial Convocation III)
Sir Sarvepalli Radhakrishran	LL.D.	Vice President of the Republic of India (Bicentennial Convocation III)
Herbert Harold Read	Sc.D.	Professor of Geology in the University of London (Bicentennial Convocation III)
David Rockefeller	LL.D.	President of Morningside Heights, Incorporated (Bicentennial Convocation III)
Jean Sarrailh	L.H.D.	Rector of the University of Paris (Bicentennial Convocation III)
Robert Livingston Schuyler	Litt.D.	Gouverneur Morris Professor Emeritus in Columbia University (Bicentennial Convocation III)
Gregg Manners Sinclair	LL.D.	President of the University of Hawaii (Bicentennial Convocation III)
Philip Edward Smith	Sc.D.	Professor Emeritus of Anatomy in Columbia University (Bicentennial Convocation III)
Paul Henri Spaak	LL.D.	Minister of Foreign Affairs for the Kingdom of Belgium (Bicentennial Convocation III)
Adlai Ewing Stevenson	LL.D.	Governor of the State of Illinois, 1948-1953 (Bicentennial Convocation III)
Arthurt Fay Taggart	Sc.D.	Vinton Professor Emeritus of Mining in Columbia University (Bicentennial Convocation III)
Lily Ross Taylor	Litt.D.	Professor Emeritus of Latin in Bryn Mawr College (Bicentennial Convocation III)
Lynn Thorndike	Litt.D.	Professor Emeritus of History in Columbia University (Bicentennial Convocation III)
Levering Tyson	LL.D.	Chancellor of the Free Europe University in Exile (Bicentennial Convocation III)
John von Neumann	Sc.D.	Professor of Mathematics in the Institute for Advanced Study (Bicentennial Convocation III)
Earl Warren	LL.D.	Chief Justice of the United States (Bicentennial Convocation III)
Hermann Weyl	Sc.D.	Professor of Mathematics in the Institute for Advanced Study (Bicentennial Convocation III)
Silvio Zavala	L.H.D.	Head of the History Commission of the Inter-American Institute of Geography and History (Bicentennial Convocation III)

1955

Recipient	Degree or Honor	Notes
Mario Scelba	LL.D.	Prime Minister of the Republic of Italy
Luis Batlle Berres	LL.D.	President of the National Council of Government of the Oriental Republic of Uruguay
Paul Eugene Magloire	LL.D.	President of the Republic of Haiti
Mohammed Reza Shah Pahlavi	LL.D.	Sananshah of Iran
Dino Bigongiari	Litt.D.	Da Ponte Professor Emeritus of Italian in Columbia University (Bicentennial Convocation II)
Frank Whittemore Abrams	LL.D.	Chairman of the Board Standard Oil Company of New Jersey
Allen Welsh Dulles	LL.D.	Deputy Director of the Central Intelligence Agency
Edward Roland Noel Harriman	LL.D.	Chairman of the American National Red Cross
Frederick Edward Hasler	LL.D.	Banker and Advocate of Inter-American Understanding
David de Sola Pool	S.T.D.	Minister of the Spanish and Portuguese Synagogue, Shearith Israel
Thomas Reed Powell	LL.D.	Story Professor Emeritus of Law in Harvard University
Howard Alexander Smith	LL.D.	United States Senator from New Jersey
Margaret Chase Smith	LL.D.	United States Senator from Maine
William Pearson Tolley	LL.D.	Chancellor of Syracuse University
Felix Andries Vening Meinesz	Sc.D.	Professor of Geodesy and Geophysics in the University of Utrecht
William John Wallin	LL.D.	Member of the Board of Regents of the University of the State of New York
Field Marshal P. Pibulsonggram	LL.D.	Prime Minister of Thailand
Carlos Castillo Armas	LL.D.	President of the Republic of Guatemala

1956

Recipient	Degree or Honor	Notes
Herbert Butterfield	Litt.D.	Master of Peterhouse of Cambridge University
George Francis Cahill	Sc.D.	Professor Emeritus of Urology at Columbia University
Margaret Clapp	Litt.D.	Pulitzer Prize Recipient
John Marshall Harlan	LL.D.	Associate Justice of the United States Supreme Court
Ivan Mestrovic	Litt.D.	Sculptor
Edmund Astley Prentis	Sc.D.	Engineer; Distinguished Alumn of Columbia
Henry Pitney Van Dusen	S.T.D.	Professor and President of Union Theological Seminary
Sukarno	LL.D.	President of Indonesia

1957

Recipient	Degree or Honor	Notes
Hans Thacher Clarke	Sc.D.	Professor of Biochemistry; Department Chair at the College of Physicians and Surgeons, Columbia University
Gaston Berger	L.H.D.	Distinguished Educator and Intellectual of France
Lee Alvin DuBridge	Sc.D.	President of the California Institute of Technology
Alfred M. Gruenther	LL.D.	Chief of the American National Red Cross; Supreme Allied Commander of NATO
Gaylord P. Harnwell	LL.D.	President of University of Pennsylvania
Robert Sherman Loomis	Litt.D.	Professor at Columbia University; Eastman Professor at Oxford University
Agnes Ernst Meyer	L.H.D.	Education activist; Philanthropist
James J. Rorimer	L.H.D.	Director of the Metropolitan Museum of Art
Afred Pritchard Sloan Jr.	LL.D.	Chairman of General Motors
Prince Wan Waithayakon	LL.D.	Foreign Minister of the government of Thailand
Marcellus Hartley Dodge	LL.D.	Trustee of Columbia University

1958

Recipient	Degree or Honor	Notes
Walter Herman Bucher	Sc.D.	Newbury Professor Emeritus of Geology
Padraic Colum	Litt.D.	Poet; Dramatist
Rene d'Harnoncourt	L.H.D.	Director of the Museum of Modern Art
Robert Francis Goheen	LL.D.	President of Princeton University
Per Jacobson	LL.D.	Managing Director of the IMF
James Rhyne Killian Jr.	Sc.D.	Educator
Herbert Henry Lehman	LL.D.	Governor of New York State; United States Senator; Director General of UN Relief and Rehabilitation Administration
Millicent Carey McIntosh	LL.D.	President of Barnard
Charlotte Haxall Noland	L.H.D.	Founder of Foxcroft School, Virginia
Sidney Earle Smith	LL.D.	Canada's Secretary of State for External Affairs

1959

Recipient	Degree or Honor	Notes
Frank Press	University Medal for Excellence	Geophysicist
Dana Winslow Atchley	Sc.D.	Professor Emeritus of Clinical Medicine, Columbia University
Lloyd Viel Berkner	Sc.D.	President, Associated Universities
Clarence Douglas Dillon	LL.D.	Under Secretary of State
Stanley Howells Fuld	LL.D.	Judge, New York State Court of Appeals
Barnaby Conrad Keeney	LL.D.	President of Brown University
Alfred A. Knopf	L.H.D.	Publisher
Arthur Whittier MacMahon	LL.D.	Professor Emeritus of Public Administration at Columbia University
John Davison Rockefeller, III	LL.D.	Chairman of the Board of Trustees of the Rockefeller Foundation
William Pierce Rogers	LL.D.	United States Attorney General
George Vernadsky	L.H.D.	Professor Emeritus of History atYale University
Henry Alsop Riley	Sc.D.	Professor Emeritus of Clinical Neurology at Columbia University
Byron Stookey	Sc.D.	Professor Emeirtus of Clinical Neurological Surgery at Columbia University
Arthur Hays Sulzberger	LL.D.	Publisher of the New York Times; Trustee of Columbia University

=== 1960s ===
1960

Recipient	Degree or Honor	Notes
Joseph Campbell	LL.D.	United States Comptroller General
Horace Donegan	S.T.D.	Bishop of New York
James Brown Fisk	Sc.D.	President, Bell Telephone Laboratories
Laurence McKinley Gould	Sc.D.	President of Carleton College; Geologist
Lister Hill	LL.D.	United States Senator from Alabama
Henry Cabot Lodge Jr.	LL.D.	United States Ambassador to the UN
Albert Joseph McConnell	Sc.D.	Provost of Trinity College, Dublin
Allan Nevins	Litt.D.	DeWitt Clinton Professor Emeritus of American History at Columbia University
Frank Pace Jr.	LL.D.	Chairman of the Board, General Dynamics Corporation; United States Secretary of the Army
Hyman George Rickover	Sc.D.	Vice Admiral, United States Navy
Mark Van Doren	Litt.D.	Professor Emeritus of English at Columbia University
Elliot Evans Cheatham	LL.D.	Charles Evans Hughes Professor Emeritus of Law at Columbia University
Francis Raymond Evershed	LL.D.	The First Baron Stapenhill
David Patrick Maxwell Fyfe	LL.D.	The First Viscount Kilmuir of Creich
Whitney North Seymour	LL.D.	President of the Bar Association
Jeanne Mitchell	University Medal for Excellence	Violinist

1961

Recipient	Degree or Honor	Notes
Charles Edouard Jeanneret	L.H.D.	Architect
Hayato Ikeda	LL.D.	Prime Minister of Japan
Thomas Sovereign Gates Jr.	LL.D.	Secretary of Defense
Thomas Keith Glennan	Sc.D.	President of Case Institute of Technology; Head of NASA
Theodore Martin Hesburgh, C.S.C.	LL.D.	President of the University of Notre Dame
Mary Shotwell Ingraham	L.H.D.	Civic Leader; Chair on the Board of Higher Education
Robert Frederick Loeb	Sc.D.	Bard Professor Emeritus of Medicine at Columbia University
Frederick Cecil Mills	LL.D.	Heburn Professor Emeritus of Economics at Columbia University
Galo Lasso Plaza	LL.D.	President of Ecuador
Walter Gropius	L.H.D.	Architect
Lawrence Edward Walsh	University Medal for Excellence	
Thomas Merton	University Medal for Excellence	

1962

Recipient	Degree or Honor	Notes
James Stacy Coles	LL.D.	Scientist; Teacher
Luther Carrington Goodrich	Litt.D.	Dean Lung Professor Emeritus of Chinese
Henry Franklin Guggenheim	LL.D.	Miner; Financier; Industrialist; Civic Leader; Diplomatist
Louis Plack Hammett	Sc.D.	Mitchill Professor Emeritus of Chemistry
Frederick Russel Kappel	LL.D.	Communications Leader
Robert McNamara	LL.D.	United States Secretary of Defense
Rosemary Park	LL.D.	Dean and President of Barnard College
Gerard Piel	L.H.D.	Science Journalist
Jean Casimir Henri Hilaire Roche	Sc.D.	Biologist; Rector of the University of Paris
John Ewart Wallace Sterling	LL.D.	President of the Association of American Universities
Llewellyn E. Thompson	LL.D.	United States ambassador to the U.S.S.R.
Arthur Michael Ramsey	S.T.D.	Archbishop of Canterbury
Ryusaku Tsunoda	Litt.D.	Former curator of Columbia University's Japanese Collection. Special convocation to celebrate the opening of a new Asian studies center at Columbia University.
Robert Jastrow	University Medal for Excellence	

1963

Recipient	Degree or Honor	Notes
Herbert Brucker	L.H.D.	Editor of the Hartford Courant. Convocation in honor of 50th anniversary of Journalism School.
James Reston	L.H.D.	Chief Washington correspondent for the New York Times. Convocation in honor of 50th anniversary of Journalism School.
Ralph Emerson McGill	L.H.D.	Publisher of the Atlanta Newspapers, Inc. Convocation in honor of 50th anniversary of Journalism School.
Hamilton Fish Armstrong	LL.D.	Editor; Author; Diplomat
John William Gardner	LL.D.	Educational Counselor; Psychologist
Walter Hallstein	LL.D.	President of the European Economic Community
Muhammad Zafrulla Khan	LL.D.	Permanent Representative of the Republic of Pakistan to the UN
John Allen Krout	LL.D.	Historian; Vice President Emeritus of Columbia University
Luis Munoz Marin	LL.D.	Governor of the Commonwealth of Puerto Rico
Douglas Stuart Moore	L.H.D.	Mac Dowell Professor of Music at Columbia University
Marjorie Hope Nicolson	Litt.D.	English teacher
Dean Rusk	LL.D.	President of the Rockefeller Foundation
Edward LaRocque Tinker	Litt.D.	Author; Patron of literature and the arts
Charles Hard Townes	Sc.D.	Physicist
Harold Brown	University Medal for Excellence	

1964

Recipient	Degree or Honor	Notes
Queen Frederika	LL.D.	Queen of the Hellenes (Greece)
John Coleman Bennett	S.T.D.	President of Union Theological Seminary
James Edward Allen Jr.	L.H.D.	President of the University of the State of New York; Commissioner of Education of New York State
Sir Eric Ashby	LL.D.	Scientist; Humanist; Diplomatist; Administrator; Internationally Acclaimed Statesman of Education
Salo Wittmayer Baron	Litt.D.	Historian of Ancient Peoples
Adolf Augustus Berle Jr.	LL.D.	Professor Emeritus of Law at Columbia University
Kingman Brewster Jr.	LL.D.	President of Yale University
Theodosius Dobzhansky	Sc.D.	Scientist; Professor of Zoology at Columbia University; Professor at the Rockefeller Institute
John Henry Fischer	L.H.D.	President of Teachers College, Columbia University
Inge Lehmann	Sc.D.	Earth Scientist; Founder of the Danish Geophysical Society; President of the European Seismological Federation
Augustus Long	LL.D.	Industrialist; President of the Presbyterian Hospital
Susanne Knauth Langer	LL.D.	Philosopher; Scholar; Teacher
Margaret Mead	LL.D.	Anthropologist
Jaiyeola Aduke Moore	LL.D.	Social Welfare Officer for Nigeria; Delegate to the UN
Alvar Aalto	L.H.D.	Master Architect
Daniel G. Hoffman	University Medal for Excellence	

1965

Recipient	Degree or Honor	Notes
Claude Thomas Bissell	LL.D.	Literary Scholar
André Frédéric Cournand	Sc.D.	Nobel Laureate
Sir Patrick Henry Dean	LL.D.	Diplomatist
Kenneth Onwuka Dike	LL.D.	Founder and Director of the National Archives of Nigeria; President of the Historical Society of Nigeria
Ludwig Erhard	LL.D.	Chancellor of Germany
Walter D. Fletcher	LL.D.	Student; Teacher; Alumnus and Trustee of Columbia University
Leland John Haworth	Sc.D.	Nuclear Physicist; Professor; Director of the National Science Foundation
George Alexander Heard	LL.D.	Political Scientist
William McChesney Martin Jr.	LL.D.	President of the New York Stock Exchange; President of the Export-Import Bank; Assistant Secretary of the Treasury; United States Director of the World Ban;. Chairman of the Board of the Federal Reserve
Alva Reimer Myrdal	L.H.D.	Diplomat
Erwin Panofsky	Litt.D.	Professor and Scholar of Art History
John Hay Whitney	LL.D.	United States Ambassador to the United Kingdom; Publisher of the New York Herald Tribune.
Alan H. Cottrell	Sc.D.	Metallurgist; Deputy Chief Scientific Advisor to the Ministry of Defense
Ferdinand W. F. Friedensburg	Sc.D.	Mining Engineer and Mineral Economist; Public Servant; Statesman
John Robinson Pierce	Sc.D.	Scientist; Engineer; Administrator
Louis A.M. Simpson	University Medal for Excellence	

1966

Recipient	Degree or Honor	Notes
Raymond Claude Ferdinand Aron	Litt.D.	Scoail Scientist; Professor; Author; Editor; Journalist; Philosopher
Sir George Coldstream, K.C.B., Q.C.	LL.D.	Senior Executive Officer of the Lord Chancellor's Office
Julius Goebel Jr.	LL.D.	Law Historian
John Courtney Murray, S.J.	S.T.D.	Worker in religion
James Alfred Perkins	LL.D.	President of Cornell University
Dickinson Woodruff Richards	Sc.D.	Physician; Teacher at College of Physicians and Surgeons, Columbia University; Nobel Prize Recipient
David Sarnoff	Sc.D.	Pioneer of Radio and Television
Julian Seymour Schwinger	Sc.D.	Professor of Physics at Harvard University
Thomas John Watson Jr.	LL.D.	Business Executive; President of IBM
Robert Clifton Weaver	LL.D.	United States Secretary of Housing and Urban Development
George David Woods	LL.D.	Economist; President of the International Bank for Reconstruction and Development
Gaston Eyskens	LL.D.	Belgian Finance Minister. Special convocation.
Sir Jehangir Jivaji Ghandy	LL.D.	Statesman; Industrialist
Philip Sporn	LL.D.	Engineer
Edward Anders	University Medal for Excellence	

1967

Recipient	Degree or Honor	Notes
Shmuel Yosef Agnon	Litt.D.	Nobel Laureate in Literature
Sir (Cecil) Maurice Bowra	Litt.D.	Warden of Wadham College, Oxford University
Clifford Philip Case	LL.D.	United States Senator from New Jersey
Lincoln Gordon	LL.D.	Scholar; United States Ambassador to Brazil; Assistant Secretary of State for Inter-American Affairs; President of Johns Hopkins University
John William King	LL.D.	Governor of New Hampshire
George Bogdan Kistiakowsky	Sc.D.	Chemist; Special Assistant in Science and Technology to the President
Edwin Herbert Land	Sc.D.	Optical Physicist; Recipient of the Presidential Medal of Freedom
Felipe Herrera Lane	LL.D.	Professor at the University of Chile; Executive Director of the IMF; President of the Inter-American Development Bank
Erich Leinsdorf	L.H.D.	Conductor of the Boston Symphony Orchestra
Geroid Tanquary Robinson	LL.D.	Founder and Director of theRussian Institute of Columbia University; Seth Low Professor of History
Nelson Aldrich Rockefeller	LL.D.	Vice President of the United States
Barbara Wertheim Tuchman	Litt.D.	Author; Historian
Eisaku Sato	LL.D.	Prime Minister of Japan. Special convocation.
William Black	L.H.D.	Chairman of the Board of Chock Full o' Nuts Corporation
Konrad Bloch	Sc.D.	Higgins Professor of Biochemistry at Harvard University; Nobel Laureate
Albert Baird Hastings	Sc.D.	Hamilton Kuhn Professor of Biochemistry at Harvard University
Joshua Lederberg	Sc.D.	Geneticist
Willard Cole Rappleye	Sc.D.	Physician; Educator; Medical Administrator; President of the Council of the Association of American Medical Colleges; Commissioner of Hospitals
James Augustine Shannon	Sc.D.	Scientist; Teacher; Administrator
Max Frankel	University Medal for Excellence	

1968

Recipient	Degree or Honor	Notes
The Right Honorable Harold Macmillan	LL.D.	Prime Minister of England. Special convocation.
Sir Isaiah Berlin	LL.D.	Scholar; Administrator; Planner; Teacher
Charles Eustis Bohlen	LL.D.	Career Diplomat
Edgar Williams Couper	LL.D.	Member of the New York Board of Regents; Chancellor of the University of the State of New York
David Dubinsky	LL.D.	Early union organizer; Director of charitable enterprises
Dudley Fitts	Litt.D.	Poet; Teacher; Scholar; Musician
Jacques Lipchitz	L.H.D.	Sculptor
Joseph Irwin Miller	LL.D.	Board member of various organizations (unspecified)
Maurice Thompson Moore	LL.D.	Chairman of the board of Trustees
Martha Elizabeth Peterson	LL.D.	Professor, Dean, and President of Barnard.
Isidor Issac Rabi	Sc.D.	Nobel Prize winning Physicist
John Hermann Randall Jr.	L.H.D.	Professor of Philosophy
Rene Welleck	Litt.D.	Comparative Literature Critic
Arthur M Okun	University Medal for Excellence	

1969

Recipient	Degree or Honor	Notes
Andrew Wellington Cordier	L.H.D.	Executive Assistant to the UN Secretary-General; Dean of the Columbia School of International Affairs; President of Columbia University
Alfred Hamilton Barr Jr.	L.H.D.	Writer; Editor; Teacher; Distinguished art historian; Director of the Museum of Modern Art.
Detlev W. Bronk	Sc.D.	Physicist; Biologist; President of Johns Hopkins University; Founder of Rockefeller University; President of the National Academy of Sciences
Eveline Mabel Burns	L.H.D.	Social Economist; Developer of American Social Security System
John Usher Monro	L.H.D.	Dean of Harvard College; Director of Freshman Studies at Miles College in Alabama
Gordon Norton Ray	LL.D.	Teacher at Harvard; Head of English Department; Vice President; Provost at the University of Illinois
U Thant	LL.D.	Secretary General of the UN
Herman B Wells	LL.D.	President and Chancellor Emeritus of Indiana University
M. Moran Weston	S.T.D.	Rector of St. Philip's Church in Harlem, founder and president of the Carver Savings and Loan Association
Roy Wilkins	LL.D.	Executive director of the N.A.A.C.P.
Robert Burns Woodward	Sc.D.	Organic Chemist; Nobel Prize Recipient
Henry Steele Commager	LL.D.	Teacher; Scholar; Editor
Peter Leonidovich Kapitza	Sc.D.	Physicist. Special convocation.
Norton D. Zinder	University Medal for Excellence	

=== 1970s ===
1970

Recipient	Degree or Honor	Notes
Pau Carlos Salvador Defillo "Pablo" Casals	L.H.D.	Conductor; Composer; Teacher; Internationalist. Special convocation.
Derek Harold Richard Barton	Sc.D.	Professor of Chemistry in the Imperial College of Science and Technology, London
Arthur Frank Burns	LL.D.	Economist; Presidential Advisor; President of the American Economic Association and the Academy of Political Science; Chairman of the Board of Governors of the Federal Reserve System
Kenneth Bancroft Clark	LL.D.	Educator; Psychologist
John Hope Franklin	LL.D.	Professor of History at the University of Chicago
Paul Felix Lazarsfeld	LL.D.	Quetelet Professor Emeritus of Social Science in Columbia University
Arthur Levitt	LL.D.	Comptroller of New York State
Louis Melville Loeb	LL.D.	Lawyer
William James McGill	L.H.D.	Chancellor of the University of California; President of Columbia University
Jean Piaget	Sc.D.	Professor of Child Psychology and the History of Scientific Thought at the University of Geneva.
Rudolph J Wittkower	L.H.D.	Avalon Foundation Professor Emeritus in the Humanities at Columbia University
Harry Austryn Wolfson	L.H.D.	Nathan Littauer Professor Emeritus of Hebrew Literature and Philosophy at Columbia University
Daniel S. Greenberg	University Medal for Excellence	

1971

Recipient	Degree or Honor	Notes
Jorge Luis Borges	Litt.D.	Writer. Special convocation.
Simeon Olaosebikan Adebo	LL.D.	Undersecretary General of the UN
Brooke Astor	LL.D.	Philanthropist
Aaron Copland	L.H.D.	Composer
Gabriel Garcia-Marquez	Litt.D.	Novelist
J. George Harrar	LL.D.	President of the Rockefeller Foundation
John George Kemeny	LL.D.	President of Dartmouth College
Claude Levi-Strauss	L.H.D.	Sociologist
H. Houston Merritt	Sc.D.	Dean Emeritus of the Faculty of Medicine; Vice President Emeritus of Columbia University
Matthew Stanley Meselson	Sc.D.	Professor of Biology at Harvard University
Ernest Nagel	Litt.D.	Professor Emeritus at Columbia University
Georgia O'Keefe	L.H.D.	Artist
Mina Splegel Rees	LL.D.	President of the Graduate Center of the City University of New York
Russell Errol Train	LL.D.	Chairman of the Council on Environmental Quality
Whitney Moore Young Jr.	LL.D.	Executive Director of the National Urban League (Awarded Posthumously)
Paul Charles Zamecnick	Sc.D.	Professor of Medicine at Harvard Medical School
Frank Altschul	L.H.D.	Philanthropist, bibliophile, and authority in international affairs
Leland Matthew Goodrich	LL.D.	American political scientist
Joseph Rudolph Grimes	LL.D.	Lawyer and leading politician in Liberia
Edvard Isak Hambro	LL.D.	Norwegian politician; President of U.N. General Assembly
Philip C. Jessup	LL.D.	Diplomat, scholar and jurist
Harold Dwight Lasswell	LL.D.	American political scientist
Julius L. Chambers	University Medal for Excellence	

1972

Recipient	Degree or Honor	Notes
Dale Raymond Corson	LL.D.	President of Cornell University
Louis Morton Hacker	L.H.D.	Professor Emeritus of Economics at Columbia University
Helen Hall	LL.D.	Social Worker
Alfred Hitchcock	L.H.D.	Film Director
Jerome Heartwell Holland	LL.D.	United States Ambassador to Sweden
Edith Altschul Lehman	LL.D.	Philanthropist
J. Edward Lumbard Jr.	LL.D.	Jurist
A. Phillip Randolph	LL.D.	Labor Leader
Harrison Ross Steeves	Litt.D.	Professor Emeritus of English at Columbia University
Jack Tworkov	L.H.D.	Artist
C. Vann Woodward	L.H.D.	Sterling Professor of History at Yale
Walter Bigelow Wriston	LL.D.	Banker
Eugene T. Rossides	University Medal for Excellence	

1973

Recipient	Degree or Honor	Notes
Kenneth J. Arrow	Sc.D.	Economist. Special Convocation for Nobel Laureates.
Leon N. Cooper	Sc.D.	Physicist. Special Convocation for Nobel Laureates.
William Stein	Sc.D.	Chemist. Special Convocation for Nobel Laureates.
George Balanchine	L.H.D.	Choreographer
Bruce Catton	Litt.D.	Author
Edward Kennedy "Duke" Ellington	Mus.D.	Composer
Henry J. Friendly	LL.D.	Jurist
Marion E. Kenworthy, M.D.	Sc.D.	Psychiatrist; Psychoanalyst
Elisabeth Luce Moore	LL.D.	Humanitarian; Educational Administrator
Samuel I. Rosenman	LL.D.	Lawyer
Martin Schwarzschild	Sc.D.	Astronomer
Paul Althaus Smith	Sc.D.	Mathematician
Frank Stanton	LL.D.	Psychologist; Broadcast Executive
Marina von Neumann Whitman	University Medal for Excellence	

1974

Recipient	Degree or Honor	Notes
Seymour Benzer	Sc.D.	Biochemist
Frederick Burkhardt	LL.D.	Educator
Katharine Graham	LL.D.	Newspaper Publisher
Michael Heidelberger	Sc.D.	Immunologist
Louis I. Kahn	L.H.D.	Architect (Awarded Posthumously)
Paul Oscar Kristeller	L.H.D.	Frederick James Eugene Woodbridge Professor Emeritus of Philosophy
Arnaldo Momigliano	L.H.D.	Distinguished scholar of historical Mediterranean era
Henry Spencer Moore	L.H.D.	Artist; Sculptor
Malcolm Wilson	LL.D.	Governor of New York State
Lawrence Arthur Wien	LL.D.	Columbia College 1925 (A.B.), Law School 1927 (LL.B.), Lawyer, realtor and philanthropist.
Jacob Neusner	University Medal for Excellence	

1975

Recipient	Degree or Honor	Notes
Takeo Miki	LL.D.	Prime Minister of Japan. Special convocation.
Kobo Abe	L.H.D.	Writer
Lawrence Arthur Cremin	Litt.D.	Educator; Historian
Carl Djerassi	Sc.D.	Chemist
Dennis Gabor	Sc.D.	Physicist
Millard Meiss	Litt.D.	Art Historian
William S. Paley	LL.D.	Broadcaster; Philanthropist; Public Servant
Arthur Rubinstein	Mus.D.	Pianist
Meyer Schapiro	Litt.D.	Art Historian; Professor Emeritus
Philip A. Lacovara	University Medal for Excellence	

1976

Recipient	Degree or Honor	Notes
Warren E. Burger	LL.D.	Chief Justice of the United States. U.S. Bicentennial Special Convocation.
Lord (Alfred Thompson) Denning	LL.D.	Master of the Rolls. U.S. Bicentennial Special Convocation.
The Right Honourable Lord C.H. Elwyn-Jones	LL.D.	Lord Chancellor of Great Britain. U.S. Bicentennial Special Convocation.
The Right Honourable Lord John Widgery, O.B.E	LL.D.	Lord Chief Justice of England. U.S. Bicentennial Special Convocation
Chaoying Fang	L.H.D.	Bibliographical Historian. Special convocation.
Lienche Tu Fang	L.H.D.	Bibliographical Historian. Special convocation.
Hugh Carey	LL.D.	Governor of New York State
Erwin Chargaff	Sc.D.	Biochemist; Awarded National Medal of Science in 1974
Walter Gellhorn	LL.D.	Legal scholar; Teacher; Public Servant
Lillian Hellman	Litt.D.	Author; Playwright
Roman Jakobson	Litt.D.	Founder of the Linguistic Circle of Prague
Edward Hirsch Levi	LL.D.	United States Attorney General
Jacquelyn Anderson Mattfeld	L.H.D.	Pianist; Music Historian; President of Barnard
Richard Brandon Morris	Litt.D.	Historian
Gregor Piatigorsky	Mus.D.	Cellist
Jacob Furth	Sc.D.	Medical Doctor; Researcher
Jacob K. Javits	LL.D.	Congressman; Attorney General of New York State
Mary Woodward Lasker	LL.D.	Biomedical Researcher
Maclyn McCarty	Sc.D.	Medical Scientist
Benno C. Schmidt	LL.D.	Co-creator of the National Cancer Program
Harold H. Helm	LL.D.	Business Leader
Charles A. Ragan Jr.	Sc.D.	Physician; Scientists; Teacher; Medical Statesman
Edgar Haber	University Medal for Excellence	
Franklin A Thomas	University Medal for Excellence	

1977

Recipient	Degree or Honor	Notes
Benjamin Joseph Buttenwieser	LL.D.	Investment Banker
Owen Chadwick	Litt.D.	Regious Professor of Modern History and Master of Selwyn College; Former Vice Chancellor of Cambridge University
Robben W. Fleming	LL.D.	Professor of Law and Chancellor of the University of Wisconsin
Murrary Gell-Mann	Sc.D.	R.A. Millikan Professor of Physics at the California Institute of Technology
Julius S. Held	Litt.D.	Art Historian
Gilbert Highet	Litt.D.	Author
Shirley Mount Hufstedler	LL.D.	Jurist; Judge in the United States Court of Appeals for the Ninth Circuit
Louise Nevelson	L.H.D.	Sculptor
Wolfgang K.H. Panofsky	Sc.D.	Physicist
Percy T. Phillips	Sc.D.	Leader in Dentistry
Laurence Sickman	L.H.D.	Curator of Oriental Art
Isaac Stern	Mus.D.	Musician
Helen Suzman	LL.D.	Professor of Economics; Member of Parliament of South Africa
Hendrick B. G. Casimir	Sc.D.	Physicist
Arne Sigvard Eklund	Sc.D.	Nuclear Physicist
Francis H.J.S. Perrin	Sc.D.	Physicist
Solly Zuckerman	Sc.D.	Baron of Burnham Thorpe; Anatomist
Peter B. Kenen	University Medal for Excellence	

1978

Recipient	Degree or Honor	Notes
Charles D. Breitel	LL.D.	Chief Judge of the Court of Appeals of New York
William T. Gossett, The Honorable	LL.D.	President of the America Bar Association; Chairman of National Board of United Negro College Fund
Soia Mentschikoff	LL.D.	Lawyer; Teacher; Dean of Miami Law School
Lewis F. Powell Jr.	LL.D.	President of the American Bar Association
Herbert Wechsler	LL.D.	Professor; Principal adviser to the American Judges at Nuremberg War Crime Trials
John D. de Butts	LL.D.	Electrical Engineer; Chairman of American Telephone and Telegraph Co.
Anna Freud	Sc.D.	Child Psychoanalist
Henry Beetle Hough	L.H.D.	Vineyard Gazette
Sir Victor Sawdon Pritchett	Litt.D.	Author
Mario G. Salvadori	Sc.D.	Engineer; Art Critic
Lewis Thomas	Sc.D.	Physician; Biomedical Researcher; Health Administrator; Poetic Essayist; President of the Memorial Slaon-Kettering Cancer Center
Virgil Thompson	Mus.D.	Composer and critic of the musical arts
William York Tindall	Litt.D.	Scholar
Clifton R. (Reginald) Wharton Jr.	LL.D.	Economist; Chancellor of the State University of New York
Sir Geoffrey Wilkinson	Sc.D.	Chemist
Walter Gilbert	Sc.D.	Molecular Biologist
Niels Kaj Jerne	Sc.D.	Director of the Basel Institute of Immunology
Donald Kennedy	Sc.D.	Commissioner of Food and Drugs in the Department of Health, Education, and Welfare
Aaron Klug	Sc.D.	Molecular Biologist
Armand Hammer	LL.D.	Industrialist
Vilma S Martinez	University Medal for Excellence	

1979

Recipient	Degree or Honor	Notes
William O. Douglas	LL.D.	Justice of the United States Supreme Court. Special Convocation.
Melvin Calvin	Sc.D.	Professor at the University of California; Nobel Prize Recipient in Chemistry
Louise Adams Holland	Litt.D.	Classicist
Mirra Komarovsky	Litt.D.	Scholar; Feminist
Paul Henry Lang	Litt.D.	Musicologist
Leontyne Price	Mus.D.	Singer
Cicely Mary Strode Saunders	LL.D.	Founder of St. Christopher's Hospice
Irving S Shapiro	LL.D.	Chairman of the board of directors; Business Leader
Franklin A. Thomas	LL.D.	Lawyer; Practical Humanist; Trsutee of Columbia University; President of the Bedford-Stuyvesant Restoration Corporation
Edgar Bright Wilson	Sc.D.	Scientist; Teacher

=== 1980s ===
1980

Recipient	Degree or Honor	Notes
Luigi Luca Cavalli-Sfroza	Sc.D.	Geneticist
Jacques Derrida	Litt.D.	Philosopher
George A. Miller	Sc.D.	Psychologist
Norman E. Borlaug	Sc.D.	Agricultural Scientist
Curt F. Buhler	Litt.D.	Historian; Scholar
May Edward Chinn	Sc.D.	Humanitarian; Physician
F. Albert Cotton	Sc.D.	Educator; Scientist
James Marston Fitch	Litt.D.	Architect; Educator
Ieoh Ming Pei	L.H.D.	Architect; Urbanist
William E. Petersen	LL.D.	Banker and Chairman of the Trustees and Trustee Emeritus of Columbia University
Prezell Russell Robinson	LL.D.	Educator; Statesman
Harry M. Rose	Sc.D.	Physician; Teacher
Rudolf Serkin	L.H.D.	Musician; Humanist
Michael I. Sovern	LL.D.	Educational Administrator; Legal Scholar
Leonard Woodcock	LL.D.	Labor Leader; Humanitarian

1981

Recipient	Degree or Honor	Notes
Kurt Otto Friedrichs	Sc.D.	Educator; Mathematician; Scientist
Robrert Dodd Lilley	LL.D.	Business and Community Leader; Trustee Emeritus of Columbia University
Robert Traill Spence Lowell Jr.	Litt.D.	Recipient of the Pulitzer Prize for Poetry
Otto Luening	Litt.D.	Composer; Educator; Musician
V.S. Naipaul	L.H.D.	Essayist; Novelist; World Author
Samson Raphaelson	L.H.D.	Author; Playwright; Screenwriter
Paul Ricoeur	Litt.D.	Humanist; Philosopher; Scholar
Samuel Ruben	Sc.D.	Inventor; Scientist
Beverly Sills Greenough	Mus.D.	Humanist; Opera Impresario; Champion of the Arts
William Clements Warren	LL.D.	Law School Dean; Scholar; Legal Advisor
George Schneiweis Wise	LL.D.	University President; Social Scientist; Philanthropist
Ntozake Shange	University Medal for Excellence	

1982

Recipient	Degree or Honor	Notes
Bishop Desmond M. Tutu	S.T.D.	Theologian; Human Rights Leader; was not allowed to leave South Africa to attend May 19 commencement ceremony. An empty chair was on stage and his citation was read at commencement. Degree was conferred by President Sovern in Johannesburg, South Africa in August 1982.
George T. Delacorte Jr.	LL.D.	Publisher; Philanthropist
Marion Donhoff	LL.D.	Journalist; Editor; Author
Eli Ginzberg	Litt.D.	Scholar; Teacher; Economist
Roald Hoffman	Sc.D.	Chemist; Scholar; Teacher
Arthur B. Krim	LL.D.	Lawyer; Motion Picture Executive
Sir Richard W. Southern	Litt.D.	Scholar; Teacher; Economist
Eudora Welty	L.H.D.	
Chein-Shiung Wu	Sc.D.	Physicist; Scholar; Teacher
Alessandro Pertini	LL.D.	President of the Republic of Italy. Special Convocation.
Yu-lan Fung	Litt.D.	Philosopher
Stephen Jay Gould	University Medal for Excellence	
Mark Eric Josephson	University Medal for Excellence	

1983

Recipient	Degree or Honor	Notes
Isaac Asimov	Sc.D.	Author; Biochemist
William Lucius Cary	LL.D.	Dwight Professor Emeritus of Law (Awarded Posthumously)
George B. Dantzig	Sc.D.	Mathematician; Educator
Northrop Frye	Litt.D.	Author; Educator
Jerome L. Greene	LL.D.	Lawyer; Philanthropist; Patron of the Arts
Polykarp Kusch	Sc.D.	Physicist; Educator
Claiborne Pell	LL.D.	United States Senator
Hildegard E. Peplau	Sc.D.	Physicist; Educator
Ira David Wallach	LL.D.	Lawyer; Businessman; Philanthropist
Edward Victor Zegarelli	Sc.D.	Educator; Oral Pathologist; Edwin S. Robinson Professor Emeritus of Dentistry; Dean Emeritus of School of Dental and Oral Surgery
Herbert A. Simon	Sc.D.	Richard King Mellon Professor of Computer Science and Psychology of Carnegie-Mellon. Computer Science Convocation to celebrate completion of Columbia's Computer Science Building.
J. Emerson Moore	University Medal for Excellence	

1984

Recipient	Degree or Honor	Notes
Malcolm Pratt Aldrich	LL.D.	Philanthropist. Celebration of the 50th anniversary of the Harkness Eye Institute.
Bob Hope	L.H.D.	Actor, Singer. Celebration of the 50th anniversary of the Harkness Eye Institute.
Bradley R. Straatsma	Sc.D.	Medical doctor, specializing in ophtalmology. Celebration of the 50th anniversary of the Harkness Eye Institute.
Erik Barnouw	Litt.D.	Scholar; Teacher
Frank T. Cary	LL.D.	Business Leader
David L. Dodd	Litt.D.	Scholar; Teacher
Ellen Victoria Futter	LL.D.	Lawyer; President of Barnard College
Jack Greenberg	LL.D.	Lawyer; Teacher
Flora Lewis	L.H.D.	Author; Journalist
Benjamin Elijah Mays	LL.D.	Editor; Public Servant; Theologian; (Awarded Posthumously)
Chloe Anthony "Toni" Morrison	L.H.D.	Editor; Novelist; Teacher
Isamu Noguchi	L.H.D.	Sculptor
Paul A. Volcker	LL.D.	Banker; Economist; Statesman
Rosalyn Sussman Yalow	Sc.D.	Nobel Laureate; Physicist
Emanuel Ax	University Medal for Excellence	

1985

Recipient	Degree or Honor	Notes
Benacerraf Baruj	Sc.D.	Nobel Laureate; Physician; Teacher
Mikhail Baryshnikov	L.H.D.	Dancer; Choreographer
Courtney C. Brown	Litt.D.	Business Executive; Educator
Mary Steichen Calderone	Sc.D.	Physician; Public Health Champion
Howard Longstreth Clark	LL.D.	Business Executive; Civic Leader
Marian Wright Edelman	LL.D.	Lawyer; Human Rights Leader
Wilfred Feinberg	LL.D.	Jurist
Joseph Lane Kirkland	LL.D.	Labor Chief; National Leader
Stella Kramrisch	Litt.D.	Scholar; Teacher
John Edward Sawyer	LL.D.	Educator; Foundation Executive
Nathan Leventhal	University Medal for Excellence	

1986

Recipient	Degree or Honor	Notes
Noboru Takeshita	LL.D.	Minister of Finance of Japan. Special Convocation.
William J. Brennan Jr.	LL.D.	Associate Justice of the United States Supreme Court
Temple Hoyne Buell	L.H.D.	Architect
William Thaddeus Coleman Jr.	LL.D.	Lawyer; Public Servant; Human Rights Advocate
Fred W. Friendly	LL.D.	Journalist; Educator; Scholar
Mitchell I. Ginsberg	Litt.D.	Social work leader; Educator
William T. Golden	LL.D.	Business Leader; Science Policy Advisor
Benny Goodman	Mus.D.	Clarinetist; Orchestra Conductor
George F. Kennan	LL.D.	Diplomat; Scholar
Karl Meyer	Sc.D.	Biochemist; Educator
George E. Palade	Sc.D.	Cell Biologist; Teacher
Margaret M. Thompson	Litt.D.	Numismatist; Museum Curator
Twyla Tharp	University Medal for Excellence	

1987

Recipient	Degree or Honor	Notes
Daniel Patrick Moynihan	LL.D.	United States Senator; Doctor of Laws given at a convocation at the university celebrating the bicentennial of the present charter of Columbia College
Samuel Eilenberg	LL.D.	Mathematician; Teacher; University President Emeritus
Hannah Holborn Gray	LL.D.	Philanthropist; Leading Citizen
Pamela C. Harriman	LL.D.	Philanthropist; Leading Citizen
Elvin Abraham Kabat	Sc.D.	Immunologist; Teacher; Higgins Professor Emeritus of Microbiology
Danny Kaye	L.H.D.	Actor. Awarded Posthumously
Charles B. Rangel	LL.D.	United States Congressman
Philip Roth	L.H.D.	Author
Morris A. Schapiro	LL.D.	Investment Banker; Philanthropist
Jean Starobinski	Litt.D.	Scholar; Teacher
Helen Hennessy Vendler	Litt.D.	Scholar; Teacher
Lowell P Weicker Jr	LL.D.	United States Senator from Connecticut. Special Convocation.
Evan A. Davis	University Medal for Excellence	

1988

Recipient	Degree or Honor	Notes
Charles R. Dawson	Sc.D.	Chemist; Teacher
Nadine Gordimer	L.H.D.	Author
Mathilde Krim	LL.D.	Scientist; Foundation Leader
Eugene M. Lang	LL.D.	Businessman; Philanthropist
Carl E. McGowan	LL.D.	Lawyer; Public Servant; Jurist (Degree Awarded Posthumously)
Emanuel M. Papper	Sc.D.	Anesthesiologist; Teacher
Paul Anthony Samuelson	Litt.D.	Nobel Laureate in Economics
Jerome S. Bruner	Sc.D.	Psychologist; Social Scientist; Educator; George Herber Mead University Professor Emeritus at the New School for Social Research
Alonzo A. Crim	LL.D.	Educator
Thomas H. Kean	LL.D.	Governor of New Jersey
Deborah W. Meier	LL.D.	Educator
Bill D. Moyers	LL.D.	Television Journalist and Commentator
John Werner Kluge	LL.D.	Broadcasting; Donor of John W. Kluge Presidential Scholars Program for Academically Talented and Financially Needy Minority Students
Augusta Souza Kappner	University Medal for Excellence	

1989

Recipient	Degree or Honor	Notes
Sir Ralf Dahrendorf	LL.D.	Educational Leader; Scholar; Teacher
Bronislaw Geremek	Litt.D.	Historian; Teacher
Nicole M. Le Douarin	Sc.D.	Cellular Biologist; Teacher
Itzhak Perlman	Mus.D.	Violinist
Edith Porada	Litt.D.	Art Historian; Teacher
Lloyd George Richards	L.H.D.	Theatre Director; University Dean
Francesco Cossiga	LL.D.	President of the Republic of Italy. Special Convocation.
Anne Marie Quindlen	University Medal for Excellence	

=== 1990s ===
1990

Recipient	Degree or Honor	Notes
Vaclav Havel	LL.D.	President of Czechoslovakia. Special Convocation.
Natalie Zemon Davis	Litt.D.	Scholar; Teacher
Joseph P. DiMaggio	LL.D.	Baseball Immortal
Milton Handler	LL.D.	Lawer; Scholar; Teacher
Helene L. Kaplan	LL.D.	Lawyer; Leader
Frank Press	Sc.D.	Geophysicist; Statesman of Science
Samuel DeWitt Proctor	S.T.D.	College President; Theologian; Pastor
P. Roy Vagelos	Sc.D.	Scientist; Teacher; Business Leader
Baruch Samuel Blumberg	Sc.D.	Scientist; Nobel Prize Recipient. Nobel Laureates Convocation.
Iosif Alexandrovich Brodsky	Litt.D.	Poet; Nobel Prize Recipient. Nobel Laureates Convocation.
Val Logsdon Fitch	Sc.D.	Physicist; Nobel Prize Recipient. Nobel Laureates Convocation.
Herbert Aaron Hauptman	Sc.D.	Mathematician; Nobel Prize Recipient. Nobel Laureates Convocation.
Willis Eugene Lamb	Sc.D.	Physicist; Nobel Prize Recipient. Nobel Laureates Convocation.
Leon Max Lederman	Sc.D.	Experimental Physicist; Nobel Prize Recipient. Nobel Laureates Convocation.
Tsung Dao Lee	Sc.D.	Physicist; Nobel Prize Recipient. Nobel Laureates Convocation.
Arno Allan Penzias	Sc.D.	Physicist; Nobel Prize Recipient. Nobel Laureates Convocation.
Jack Steinberger	Sc.D.	Physicist; Nobel Prize Recipient. Nobel Laureates Convocation.
George Joseph Stigler	Sc.D.	Economist. Nobel Laureates Convocation.
Samuel Chao Chung Ting	Sc.D.	Particle Physicist; Nobel Prize Recipient. Nobel Laureates Convocation.
Harold Eliot Varmus	Sc.D.	Cell Biologist; Nobel Prize Recipient. Nobel Laureates Convocation.
George Wald	Sc.D.	Nobel Prize Recipient. Nobel Laureates Convocation.
Steven Weinberg	Sc.D.	Physicist. Nobel Laureates Convocation.

1991

Recipient	Degree or Honor	Notes
Russell Wayne Baker	Litt.D.	Columnist; Author
Joan Ganz Cooney	LL.D.	Broadcasting Executive
William Dillard	LL.D.	Business Leader
John Birks "Dizzy" Gillespie	Mus.D.	Composer; Musician
Thomas S. Kuhn	Litt.D.	Philosopher; Teacher
Mary Douglas Leakey	Litt.D.	Archaeologist; Anthropologist
Walter Eugene Massey	Sc.D.	Physicist; Teacher; Statesman of Science
Melvin Schwartz	Sc.D.	Physicist; Teacher
David Benjamin Sprinson	Sc.D.	Biochemist; Teacher

1992

Recipient	Degree or Honor	Notes
Harry A. Blackmun	LL.D.	Supreme Court Justice
Johnetta B. Cole	LL.D.	Educational Leader
Gertrude B. Elion	Sc.D.	Nobel Laureate in Medicine
Horst Fuhrmann	Litt.D.	Scholar; Teacher
Katharine Houghton Hepburn	L.H.D.	Actress; Author
Marshall Darrow Shulman	Litt.D.	Diplomat; Adlai E. Stevenson Emeritus of International Relations
Arthur Ochs Sulzberger	LL.D.	Publisher of the New York Times; Philanthropist
Jacqueline K. Barton	University Medal for Excellence	

1993

Recipient	Degree or Honor	Notes
Arthur Ashe	LL.D.	Champion Athlete; Social Advocate (Awarded Posthumously)
Gary Stanley Becker	Sc.D.	Nobel Laureate in Economics; Educator
Harold George (Harry) Belafonte	L.H.D.	Entertainer; Human Rights Leader
Seymour Milstein	LL.D.	Business Leader; Philanthropist
Mary Robinson	LL.D.	President of Ireland
George Erik Rupp	Litt.D.	President of Rice University; President-Designate of Columbia University
Susan Sontag	L.H.D.	Author; Social Critic
Gilbert Stork	Sc.D.	Higgins Professor Emeritus of Chemistry at Columbia University
George Stephanopoulos	University Medal for Excellence	

1994

Recipient	Degree or Honor	Notes
Tenzin Gyatso	L.H.D.	14th Dalai Lama of Tibet. Special Convocation.
James Comer	LL.D.	Psychiatrist; Educator
William Theodore de Bary	Litt.D.	Asian Studies Scholar; Educator; Son of Columbia
Dorothy DeLay	Mus.D.	Violinist; Educator
Betty Friedan	Litt.D.	Author; Feminist Leader
Ruth Bader Ginsberg	LL.D.	Supreme Court Justice; Teacher; Scholar
Harry Barkus Gray	Sc.D.	Chemist; Educator
Johan Jorgen Holst	LL.D.	Norwegian Minister of Foreign Affairs; Peacemaker (Awarded Posthumously)
Ellen Victoria Futter	University Medal for Excellence	

1995

Recipient	Degree or Honor	Notes
Madeleine K. Albright	LL.D.	United States Permanent Representative to the UN
Louis Henkin	LL.D.	University Professor; Human Rights Scholar
Teddy Kollek	LL.D.	Statesman; Peacemaker
Robert B.W. MacNeil	L.H.D.	Broadcast Journalist; Author; Linguist
Salome G Waelsch	Sc.D.	Cell Biologist
William Julius Wilson	Litt.D.	Sociologist; Educator; Public Servant
Noam David Elkies	University Medal for Excellence	

1996

Recipient	Degree or Honor	Notes
Toru Takemitsu	Mus.D.	Japanese composer
Mark O. Hatfield	LL.D.	United States Senator
Andrei Kozyrev	LL.D.	Statesman; Reformer
Irwin D. Mandel	Sc.D.	Scientist; Educator; Author
Wyton Marsalis	Mus.D.	Composer; Musician; Teacher
Sadako Ogata	LL.D.	Diplomat; Educator; Humanitarian
Franz Rosenthal	Litt.D.	Scholar; Author; Mentor
Edwards Witten	Sc.D.	Physicist; Mathematician; Innovator
Helene Gayle	University Medal for Excellence	

1997

Recipient	Degree or Honor	Notes
Sydney Brenner	Sc.D.	Scientist; Innovator
Kathryn Wasserman Davis	LL.D.	Diplomat; Educator
Eric John Earnest Hobsbawn	Litt.D.	Historian; Author
Donald Keene	Litt.D.	University Professor
John R. Lewis	LL.D.	Congressman; Civil Rights Leader
Joseph Greenaway	University Medal for Excellence	

1998

Recipient	Degree or Honor	Notes
Bruce M. Alberts	Sc.D.	Molecular Biologist; Public Educator
Kofi A. Annan	LL.D.	Secretary-General of the UN
Lauren Bacall	L.H.D.	Actress; Activist
Rita Frances Dove	Litt.D.	Poet Laureate
Amartya Sen	Litt.D.	Development Economist
Maurice Sendak	L.H.D.	Artist; Writer
Fritz Stern	Litt.D.	University Professor Emeritus
Rockard J. Delgadillo	University Medal for Excellence	

1999

Recipient	Degree or Honor	Notes
Muhammad Ali	LL.D.	The Greatest
Noam Chomsky	Litt.D.	Philosopher; Linguist; Activist.
David Brion Davis	LL.D.	Author; Scholar; Teacher;
Mildred Dresselhaus	Sc.D.	Physicist; Educator; Leader
Lawrence Kolb, M.D.	Sc.D.	Visionary; Author; Mentor
Ernest "Tito" Puente	Mus.D.	King of Latin Music
Julie Taymor	L.H.D.	Director; Designer; Mythologist
Richard Zare	Sc.D.	Chemist; Teacher; Innovator
Paul Sereno	University Medal for Excellence	

== 2000- ==
=== 2000s ===
2000

Recipient	Degree or Honor	Notes
Martti Ahtisaari	LL.D.	Statesman; Humanitarian
David D. Ho	Sc.D.	Pioneer of Biomedical Research
Judith Jamison	L.H.D.	Dancer; Choreographer; Virtuoso
Paul Alan Marks	Sc.D.	Teacher; Researcher; Institution Builder
Robert E Rubin	LL.D.	Financial Savant; Public servant
Oscar Schachter	LL.D.	Teacher; Scholar; Diplomat
Rolando Tomas Acosta	University Medal for Excellence	

2001

Recipient	Degree or Honor	Notes
Timothy Berners-Lee	LL.D.	Inventor of the Web
Peter Robert Lamont Brown	Litt.D.	Historian; Biographer
Isidore S. Edelman	Sc.D.	Biochemist; Genomecist
Judith Smith Kaye	LL.D.	Chief Judge
Arthur Levitt Jr.	LL.D.	Public Servant
Maxwell L. Roach	Mus.D.	Percussionist; Conductor
George P. Shultz	LL.D.	Statesman
Zhen-Yi Wang	Sc.D.	Medical Pioneer
Neil Degrasse Tyson	University Medal for Excellence	

2002

Recipient	Degree or Honor	Notes
Jack Beeson	Mus.D.	Composer; Teacher
Lee. C Bollinger	LL.D.	President of Columbia University
Joan Didion	Litt.D.	Novelist; Essayist
Roberto Gonalez Echevarria	Litt.D.	Scholar; Teacher
Brenda Milner	Sc.D.	Scientific Pioneer
George J. Mitchell	LL.D.	Statesman; Public Servant
Ruth J. Simmons	LL.D.	President of Brown University
George Yancopolous	University Medal for Excellence	

2003

Recipient	Degree or Honor	Notes
Maya Angelou	Litt.D.	Author; Activist
Julian Hochberg	Sc.D.	Centennial Professor Emeritus of Psychology
Frank Kermode	Litt.D.	Critic; Scholar; Teacher
Mary-Claire King	Sc.D.	Geneticist
Constance Baker Motley	LL.D.	United States District Judge
Cecil Taylor	Mus.D.	Musician; Composer
Andrew Wiles	Sc.D.	Mathematician
Claire Shipman	University Medal for Excellence	

2004

Recipient	Degree or Honor	Notes
Laurie Anderson	Mus.D.	Performing Artist
David Baltimore	Sc.D.	Scientist; Educator
The Honorable Michael R. Bloomberg	LL.D.	Leader; Philanthropist
The Honorable Robert L. Carter	LL.D.	Pioneering Civil Rights Attorney; Jurist
Arthur C. Danto	Litt.D.	Art Historian; Critic; Philosopher
Oliver W. Hill	LL.D.	Pioneering Civil Rights Attorney; Jurist
The Honorable Louis H. Pollak	LL.D.	Pioneering Civil Rights Attorney; Jurist
Leo Steinberg	Litt.D.	Art Historian; Author; Educator
The Honorable Jack B. Weinstein	LL.D.	Pioneering Civil Rights Attorney; Jurist
Craig Steven Wilder	University Medal for Excellence	

2005

Recipient	Degree or Honor	Notes
Robert A. Dahl	Litt.D.	Scholar; Political Scientist
Henry Franklin Graff	Litt.D.	Presidential Scholar; Teacher
Zaha M. Hadid	L.H.D.	Architect
Dorothy Irene Height	LL.D.	Social Activist
Brent Scowcroft	LL.D.	Military Leader; Presidential Adviser
Shirley M. Tilghman	Sc.D.	Molecular Biologist; Teacher
Endel Tulving	Sc.D.	Cognitive Scientist
August Wilson	Litt.D.	Playwright
Jhumpa Lahiri	University Medal for Excellence	

2006

Recipient	Degree or Honor	Notes
Kenneth Chenault	LL.D.	Business; Community Leader
C.K. Chu	Sc.D.	Mathematician
Gerda Lerner	Litt.D.	Historian
Maya Lin	L.H.D.	Artist; Architect
Oswaldo Paya	LL.D.	Human Rights Activist
Irving Weissman	Sc.D.	Cell Biologist
Sallie Krawcheck	University Medal for Excellence	

2007

Recipient	Degree or Honor	Notes
Aharon Barak	LL.D.	Israel Supreme Court President
Santiago Calatrava	L.H.D.	Architect
Benjamin Solomon Carson Sr.	Sc.D.	Neurosurgeon
Susan Lindquist	Sc.D.	Microbiologist
Barbara Novak	Litt.D.	Art Historian
Felix G. Rohatyn	LL.D.	Financier; Public Servant
Jonathan Spence	Litt.D.	Historian
Stephen Joel Trachtenberg	LL.D.	Leader in Higher Education
Suzanne Malveaux	University Medal for Excellence	

2008

Recipient	Degree or Honor	Notes
Fazle Hasan Abed	LL.D.	Social Entrepreneur
Emanuel Ax	Mus.D.	Pianist
Dawn Greene	LL.D.	Philanthropist
Eric S. Lander	Sc.D.	Geneticist
William E. Leuchtenberg	Litt.D.	Historian
Gertrude F. Neumark	Sc.D.	Physicist
Judith Shapiro	LL.D.	Educator
Alicia Graf	University Medal for Excellence	

2009

Recipient	Degree or Honor	Notes
Kwame Anthony Appiah	Litt.D.	Philosopher
P.N. Bhagwati	LL.D.	Chief Justice of the Supreme Court of India
Caroline Walker Bynum	Litt.D.	Medieval History Scholar
Ainslie T. Embree	Litt.D.	Historian of Modern South Asia
Paul Farmer	Litt.D.	Physician; Anthropologist
Helene D. Gayle	LL.D.	International Humanitarian
H. FitzGerald Lenfest	LL.D.	Media Entrepreneur; Philanthropist
Joseph L. Sax	LL.D.	Environmental Law; Property Law Scholar
Kiran Desai	University Medal for Excellence	

=== 2010s ===
2010

Recipient	Degree or Honor	Notes
Bernard Bailyn	Litt.D.	Historian
Jacqueline K. Barton	Sc.D.	Chemist
Geoffrey Canada	LL.D.	Social Activist, Educator
C. Lowell Harriss	Litt.D.	Economist; awarded posthumously.
Joel I. Klein	LL.D.	Education Reformer, Attorney
Tony Kushner	Litt.D.	Playwright
Koji Nakanishi	Sc.D.	Chemist
Dana Schutz	University Medal for Excellence	
Xu Bing	L.H.D.	Artist
Ron Gonen	University Medal for Excellence	

2011

Recipient	Degree or Honor	Notes
Ornette Coleman	Mus.D.	Musician (Jazz)
Martin Meisel	Litt.D.	English Scholar, Columbia University professor/administrator
Eleanor Jackson Piel	LL.D.	Lawyer; "champion of social justice"
Lydia Polgreen	University Medal for Excellence	
Joan A. Steitz	Sc.D.	Geneticist
Keith Thomas	LL.D.	Historian

2012

Recipient	Degree or Honor	Notes
Muhal Richard Abrams	Mus.D.	Pianist and composer
Michelle Bachelet	LL.D.	Political Leader and Physician
Shu Chien	Sc.D.	Vascular Physiology and Bioengineering Scholar
Jean Franco	Litt.D.	English and Comparative Literature Scholar; Columbia University Professor Emerita.
Amy Gutman	LL.D.	University of Pennsylvania President, Political Scientist, and Philosopher
Thomas Robert Kitt	University Medal for Excellence	Award-winning composer, conductor, arranger and musical director.
Gloria Steinem	LL.D.	Author and Activist

2013

Recipient	Degree or Honor	Notes
Alicia Abella	University Medal for Excellence	Engineer and Technology Executive
Herbert Irving	LL.D.	Philanthropist
Florence Irving	LL.D.	Philanthropist
Peter E. Steiger	LL.D.	Editor and Journalist
Arnold Rampersad	Litt.D.	Biographer, Literary Critic, Scholar
Laurence H. Tribe	Litt.D.	University Professor and Constitutional Law Scholar at Harvard, Attorney
Stanley Falkow	Sc.D.	Microbiologist
Zena A. Stein	Sc.D.	Professor Emerita of Public Health and Psychiatry, Columbia University Mailman School of Public Health; Pioneer of HIV Prevention for Women

2014

Recipient	Degree or Honor	Notes
Renzo Piano	L.H.D.	Architect
Cicely L. Tyson	L.H.D.	Actress
Mortimer B. Zuckermer	LL.D.	Real Estate Developer, Publisher, Philanthropist
David Remnick	Litt.D.	Writer and Editor
David Rosand	Litt.D.	Art Historian
Robert B. Silvers	Litt.D.	Editor of The New York Review of Books
Natasha Trethewey	Litt.D.	US Poet Laureate, Author, Scholar
Joseph B. Keller	Sc.D.	Mathematician
Alisa Weilerstein	University Medal for Excellence	Cellist

2015

Recipient	Degree or Honor	Notes
Theda Skocpal	Litt.D.	Professor at Harvard
Albie Sachs	LL.D.	Anti-apartheid activist
David Levering Lewis	Litt.D.	Historian
Miloš Forman	L.H.D.	Film director
Anthony S. Fauci	Sc.D.	HIV Researcher
William V. "Bill" Campbell	LL.D.	Business executive
Andrea Elliott	University Medal for Excellence	Reporter for New York Times

2016

Recipient	Degree or Honor	Notes
Ban Ki-Moon	LL.D.	Eighth Secretary-General of the United Nations
Amanda M. Burden	LL.D.	Urban planner
Zhu Chen	Sc.D.	Leading scientist in leukemia translational studies and China's Minister of Health (2007–2013)
Robert Darnton	Litt.D.	Cultural historian and academic librarian. Carl H. Pforzheimer University Professor and Director of the University Library at Harvard University
Susan Meiselas	L.H.D.	Photographer
Arthur Mitchell	L.H.D.	Dancer; A pioneer, an icon, and a self-described “political activist through dance,”
Robert Owen Paxton	Litt.D.	Mellon Professor Emeritus of Social Sciences at Columbia University
Tracy K. Smith	University Medal for Excellence	American poet

2017

Recipient	Degree or Honor	Notes
Jacques Pépin	L.H.D.	Author and Chef
Eric H. Holder Jr.	LL.D.	82nd Attorney General of the United States
Admiral Michael Mullen	LL.D.	17th Chairman of the Joint Chiefs of Staff
Julia Bacha	University Medal for Excellence	Filmmaker
Padma Desai	Litt.D.	Gladys and Roland Harriman Professor Emerita of Comparative and Economic Systems and Economics
Martin Duberman	Litt.D.	Historian, Biographer, Autobiographer, Political Essayist, Playwright, and Gay Rights Advocate
João Gilberto Prado Pereira de Oliveira	Mus.D.	Musician and Composer
Allen Irwin Hyman, M.D.	Sc.D.	Professor Emeritus of Anesthesiology, Physician, and Public Health Advocate

2018

Recipient	Degree or Honor	Notes
Elizabeth Diller	L.H.D.	Architect and Designer
Thelma Golden	L.H.D.	Museum Director and Curator
Patrick Hubert Gaspard	LL.D.	Human rights advocate, public servant, and former United States Ambassador to South Africa
Bradley R. Efron	Sc.D.	Statistician
Lynn Sykes	Sc.D.	Higgins Professor Emeritus of Earth and Environmental Sciences and Seismologist
Shazi Visram	University Medal for Excellence	Entrepreneur and Activist

2019

Recipient	Degree or Honor	Notes
Peter Awn	Litt.D.	
Douglas A. Chalmers	L.H.D.	Professor Emeritus of Political Science, Special Assistant to the Provost for Faculty Retirement, and Executive Director of the Society of Senior Scholars at Columbia University.
Karen Brooks Hopkins	LL.D.	Board Member and Senior Advisor to the Onassis Foundation USA. She is also the Nasher Haemisegger Fellow at the National Center for Arts Research, located at Southern Methodist University in Dallas, Texas.
Robert Langer	Sc.D.	Institute Professor at the Massachusetts Institute of Technology
Jamie Kern Lima	University Medal for Excellence	Co-founders and Co-Chief Executive Officers of IT Cosmetics
Paulo Lima	University Medal for Excellence	Co-founders and Co-Chief Executive Officers of IT Cosmetics
Molly Ola Pinney	University Medal for Excellence	Founder and chief executive officer of the Global Autism Project

=== 2020s ===
No Honorary Degrees awarded in 2020 or 2021 due to COVID-19 Pandemic

2022

Recipient	Degree or Honor	Notes
Hillary Rodham Clinton	LL.D.	67th United States Secretary of State, Former United States Senator from New York, and Former First Lady of the United States
Carla Hayden	Litt.D.	14th Librarian of Congress
Jodi Kantor	University Medal for Excellence	
William Kentridge	LH.D.	Artist
Yo-Yo Ma	Mus.D.	Cellist and Humanitarian
James Stewart Polshek	LH.D.	Architect and Dean Emeritus of the Columbia Graduate School of Architecture, Planning and Preservation
Patti Smith	Mus.D.	Poet and Performer

2023

Recipient	Honorary Degree or Honor
Katori Hall	University Medal for Excellence
Joyce Ladner	Litt.D.
Jeannie Bachelor Lavine	LL.D.
Jonathan Lavine	LL.D.
Tania León	Mus.D.
Minouche Shafik	LL.D.
Bob Woodward	Litt.D.
Shing-Tung Yau	Sc.D.

2024

Announced by the university, but not awarded due to the cancellation of University Commencement.

Recipient	Honorary Degree or Honor	Notes
Kizzmekia S. Corbett-Helaire	Sc.D.	Viral Immunologist
Zvi Galil	Litt.D.	Computer Scientist
Barney S. Graham	Sc.D.	Immunologist, Virologist, and Vaccinologist
Robert Reffkin	University Medal for Excellence	Entrepreneur and Philanthropist
Darren Walker	Litt.D.	Philanthropic Leader

2025

Recipient	Honorary Degree or Honor	Notes
Darren Walker	Litt.D.	Philanthropic Leader
Zvi Galil	Litt.D.	Computer Scientist and Dean Emeritus of the Fu Foundation School of Engineering and Applied Science
Claudia Goldin	Litt.D.	Nobel Laureate and Economist
Daniel Kahneman	Litt.D. (Posthumous)	Psychologist
Barney S. Graham	Sc.D.	Immunologist, Virologist, and Vaccinologist

2026

Recipient	Honorary Degree or Honor	Notes
Jon Batiste	Mus.D.	Singer, Songwriter, Composer, and Pianist
Michael L. Lomax	LL.D.	CEO of the United Negro College Fund and Philanthropist
Michael Novak	University Medal for Excellence	Dancer, Artistic Director of Paul Taylor Dance Company
Amanda Peet	LH.D.	Actress, Writer, TV and Film Producer
George Stephanopoulos	LL.D.	Journalist and TV News Anchor
Harriet Zuckerman	Litt.D.	Professor Emerita of Sociology at Columbia University

== Notes ==
Honorees from 1758 to 2022 sourced in its entirety from Columbia University Libraries. Honorees 2022–present sourced from Columbia University Office of the Secretary or as cited. Additional information is cited inline where applicable.
