= Mrinal Datta Chaudhuri =

Indian economist

Mrinal Datta-Chaudhuri
- Born: 4 January 1934; Srigauri, Cachar, Assam, British India
- Died: 19 May 2015 (aged 81); Pune, Maharashtra, India
- Other name: MDC
- Education: Presidency University, Kolkata; MIT
- Occupations: Theoretical economist Writer; Academic
- Years active: 1966–2008
- Known for: Academics in Economics; Writings
- Awards: Padma Bhushan

Mrinal Datta-Chaudhuri (1934–2015), popularly known as MDC, was an Indian theoretical economist, academic and a professor of the Delhi School of Economics. He was a member of the Institute for Advanced Study, Princeton. The Government of India awarded him the third highest civilian honour of the Padma Bhushan, in 2005, for his contributions to literature and education.

== Biography ==
Mrinal Datta-Chaudhuri was born on 4 January 1935 at Srigauri, a small village in Cachar, Assam, in East Bengal of the British India. He did his college education at Shantiniketan where he studied with Amartya Sen, who later won the Nobel Prize for economics, and Sukhamoy Chakraborty. He completed his post graduate education at Presidency College, Calcutta. Receiving a full-paid scholarship to pursue his doctoral studies at Massachusetts Institute of Technology, he studied under the guidance of Paul Samuelson, the first American Nobel Laureate in Economics who was later described by The New York Times as the foremost academic economist of the 20th century. The stint at MIT also gave him opportunity to study under Nobel Prize winners such as Robert Solow, Franco Modigliani and Kenneth Arrow and mingle with Joseph Stiglitz and George Akerlof, who would also go on to win Nobel Prize later.

Datta-Chaudhuri secured his PhD in economics in 1966 and returned to India the same year to start his career at the Indian Statistical Institute to work for the next two years there as well as at Jadavpur University. He moved to Delhi School of Economics in 1968, reportedly on invitation from K. N. Raj, the author of the introductory chapter of the first Five Year Plan of India, as a professor of Economics and worked there until his superannuation in 1999. During this period, he served as the Head of the Department of Economics from 1974 to 1977 and as the director of the institution from 1986 to 1991. He also served as a visiting professor at University of California, Berkeley, University of Minnesota and Harvard University.

Datta-Chaudhuri, a member of the Institute for Advanced Study, Princeton, was credited with several articles which included Market Failures and Government Failures published in the Journal of Economic Perspectives (1990) and contributions to texts such as the 75-page chapter on Interindustry Planning Models for a Multiregional Economy in the book Economy-wide models and development planning. He co-wrote one book, Regional Development Experiences and Prospects in South and Southeast Asia with Louis Lefeber and edited another, Development and Change: Essays in Honour of K. N. Raj. He had close association with Manmohan Singh and when the latter became the Finance Minister of India in 1991 during the economic crisis, Datta-Chaudhuri assisted him in the formulation of many policy decisions and remained a member of the unofficial think-tank during Singh's tenancy as the Finance Minister and later, as the Prime Minister. The Government of India awarded him the civilian honor of the Padma Bhushan in 2005.

Towards the later days of his life, he had chronic obstructive pulmonary disease and moved to Pune to stay with his brother, Malay Dutta Choudhury. He died, aged 82, on 19 May 2015 reportedly due to cardiac arrest, at his brother's residence, survived by two sons from his second marriage, Timir Datta-Chaudhuri and Mihir Datta-Chaudhuri, his first wife had predeceased him.
