= Delhi School of Economics =

Institution of the University of Delhi

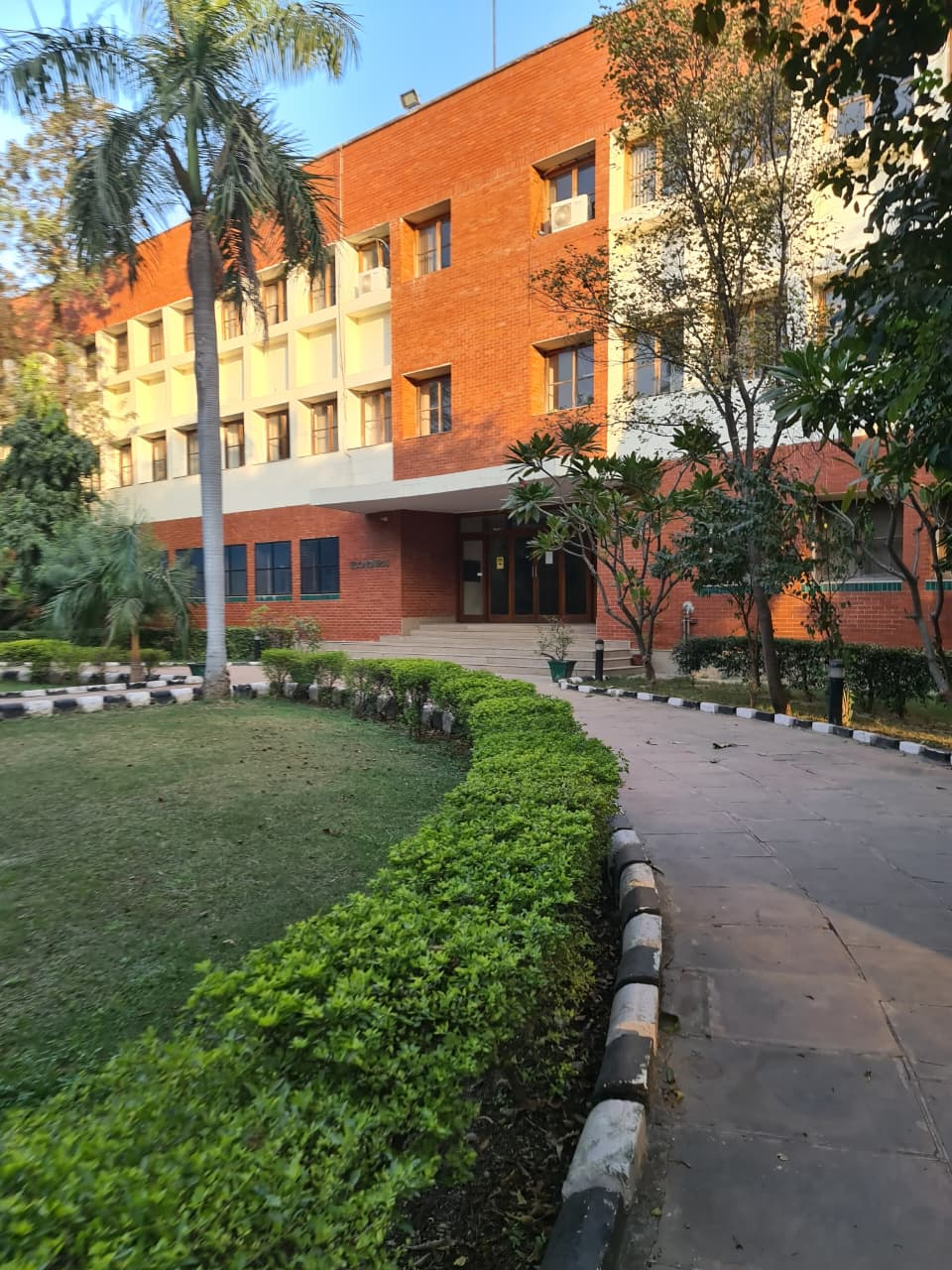
- Other name: DSE
- Motto: तमसो मा ज्योतिर् गमय
- Motto in English: Lead us from darkness to light
- Type: Higher Educational Institution
- Established: 1949; 77 years ago
- Academic affiliations: University of Delhi
- Director: Ram Singh
- Location: Delhi, India
- Campus: Urban
- Website: www.dse.du.ac.in

Delhi School of Economics (DSE), popularly referred to as D School, is a prestigious institution of higher learning within the Delhi University. The Delhi School of Economics is situated in University of Delhi's North Campus in Maurice Nagar. Established in 1949, the campus of the Delhi School of Economics houses the University of Delhi's departments of Economics, Sociology, Geography and Commerce, as well as the Ratan Tata Library. Out of the four academic departments, the Departments of Economics, Sociology and Geography come under the Faculty of Social Sciences, while the Department of Commerce comes under the Faculty of Commerce and Business Studies.

Many of its former faculty members and alumni have gone ahead to become economists, social scientists, writers, heads of states and journalists. It presently offers multiple post graduate and doctoral level programmes in a wide range of disciplines.

== Campus ==
The Delhi School of Economics campus is situated in University of Delhi's North Campus in Maurice Nagar. It is surrounded by other institutions and constituent colleges of the University of Delhi, such as Ramjas College, The Faculty of Management Studies, St. Stephen's College, KMC and Hindu College. Three constituent departments of the Faculty of Social Sciences - Economics, Sociology and Geography- lie within the Delhi School of Economics campus. It additionally also houses the Department of Commerce, which is a part of the Faculty of Commerce and Business Studies, and the Ratan Tata Library.

== Constituents ==
=== Department of Economics ===
Among the faculty at the department of economics have been the likes of V.K.R.V. Rao, B.N. Ganguly and K.N. Raj (all three of whom went on to serve as vice-chancellors at the University of Delhi), Amartya Sen (Nobel Laureate), Manmohan Singh (the former Indian Prime Minister and also the key architect of the economic reforms since 1991), Sukhomoy Chakravarty (who was chief economic advisor), Jagdish Bhagwati, Sat Parashar, Kaushik Basu, Arjun Kumar Sengupta, Partha Sen, Raj Krishna, Syed Mohammad Ali, the economic historian Tapan Raychaudhuri and others.

The department has been associated with three important journals over the years. It publishes the Indian Economic Review, several faculty members edit the Indian Economic and Social History Review, and for many years it housed the Journal of Quantitative Economics.

Prof. Rohini Somanathan is currently the head of the department.

The department currently offers a MA and a PhD in economics.

=== Department of Geography ===
Professor V.K.R.V. Rao, the university's vice-chancellor at the time, took the initiative to create the Department of Geography in October 1959. George Kuriyan, a renowned geographer, was the first professor and the founder of the department. He was followed in 1966 by V.L.S. Prakasa Rao, who served as the department's head until 1973. During this period, the department acquired a distinctive identity in India and abroad. In 1976, the department was renamed as the Department of Geography owing to the widening of scope of teaching and research activity in not only human, but also physical aspects of Geography. The Faculty members undertake research projects from various agencies including University Grants Commission, Indian Council of Social Science Research, Council for Scientific and Industrial Research, Indo-Canadian Shastri Institute and Ministries of Government of India, which include Indian Space Research Organization, Department of Science and Technology and the Planning Commission.

Prof. Anindita Data is currently serving Head of the department, making history as the first female to hold a full term in this role. She is also the first South Asian women to be elected for vice president, International Geographical Union (IGU).

The department currently offers a MA and PhD in geography.

=== Department of Sociology ===
In 2010, Professor Nandini Sundar from the department, won the Infosys prize in the field of social anthropology. Prof. Anuja Aggarwal is serving the current head for the department.

== Ratan Tata Library ==
The Ratan Tata Library, popularly referred to as RTL, is situated in the Delhi School of Economics campus.

== Notable people ==
=== Notable faculty ===
- Manmohan Singh, former prime minister of India
- K. L. Krishna, eminent Indian economist and former director of DSE
- Jagdish Bhagwati, professor of economics and law at Columbia University
- M.N. Srinivas, Indian sociologist
- Kaushik Basu, senior vice president and chief economist at World Bank
- Veena Das, Krieger-Eisenhower Professor of Anthropology at Johns Hopkins University
- Pranab Bardhan, professor emeritus of economics at University of California, Berkeley
- Sukhamoy Chakraborty (1934–1990), noted Indian economist
- K.R. Narayanan, 10th president of India
- Prasanta Pattanaik, emeritus professor, University of California, Riverside
- Andre Beteille, Indian sociologist and Padma Bhushan recipient
- Raj Krishna
- V. K. R. V. Rao, vice chancellor of Delhi University
- Tapan Raychaudhuri
- Amartya Sen, Nobel laureate
- K. N. Raj
- Padma Desai
- Suresh Tendulkar
- Ashok Mitra
- Arjun Kumar Sengupta
- Mrinal Datta Chaudhuri, former director and Padma Bhushan recipient
- R. S. Nigam, former director and recipient of Lifetime Achievement award by A. P. J. Abdul Kalam
- J. P. S. Uberoi, retired professor
- Shambhavi Choudhary, Member of Parliament in 18th Lok Sabha representing Samastipur Loksabha Constituency

=== Notable alumni ===
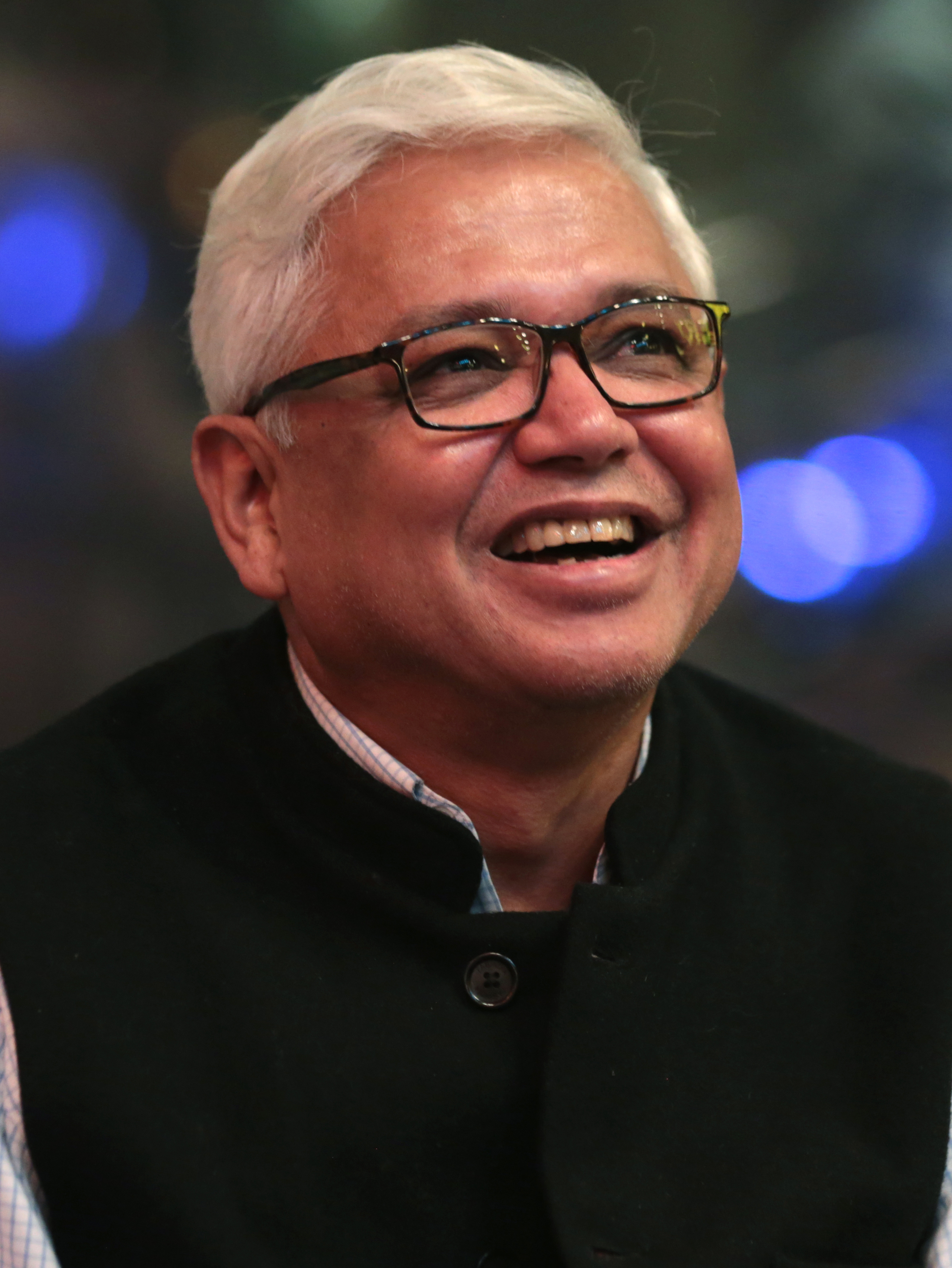
Amitav Ghosh

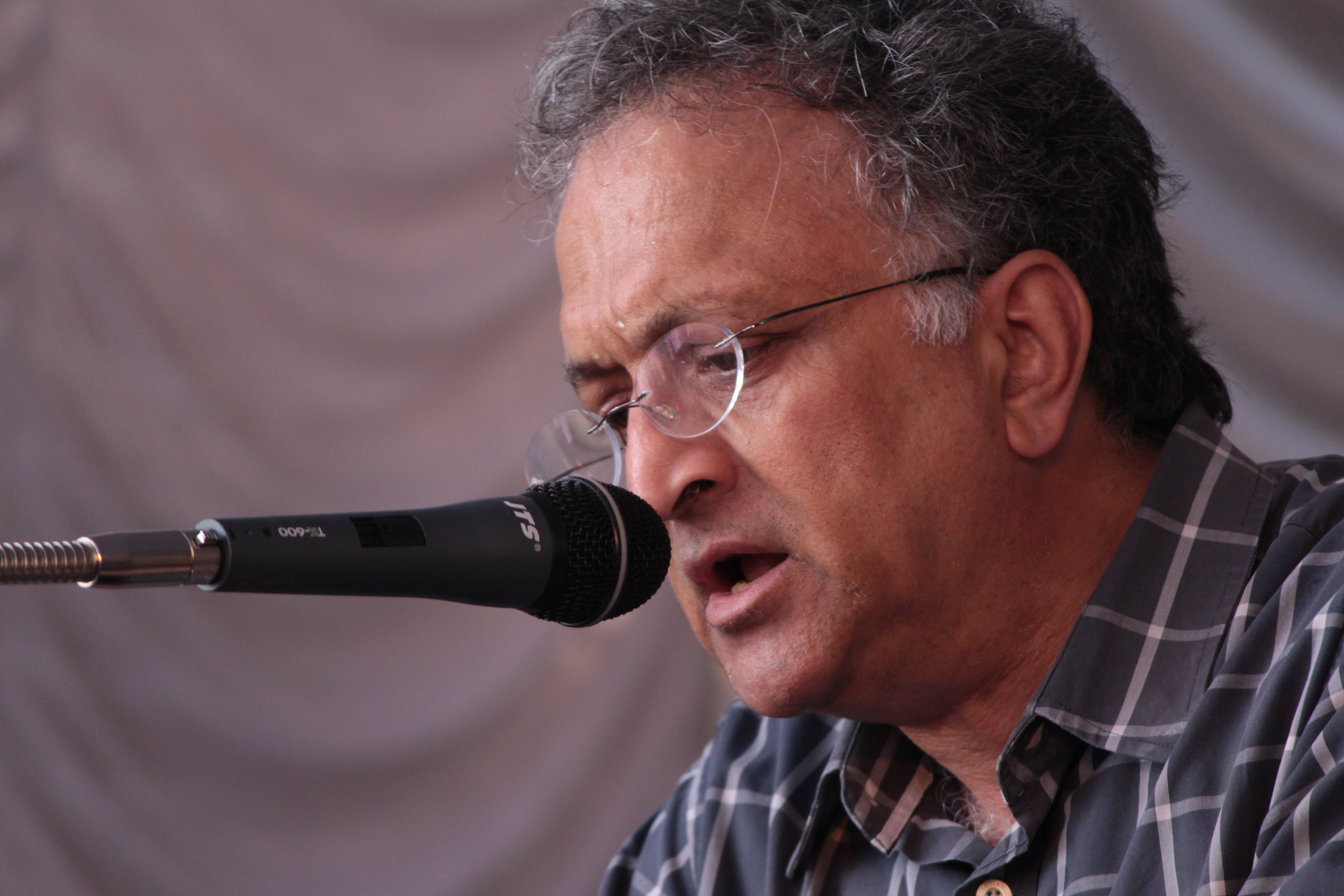
Ramchandra Guha

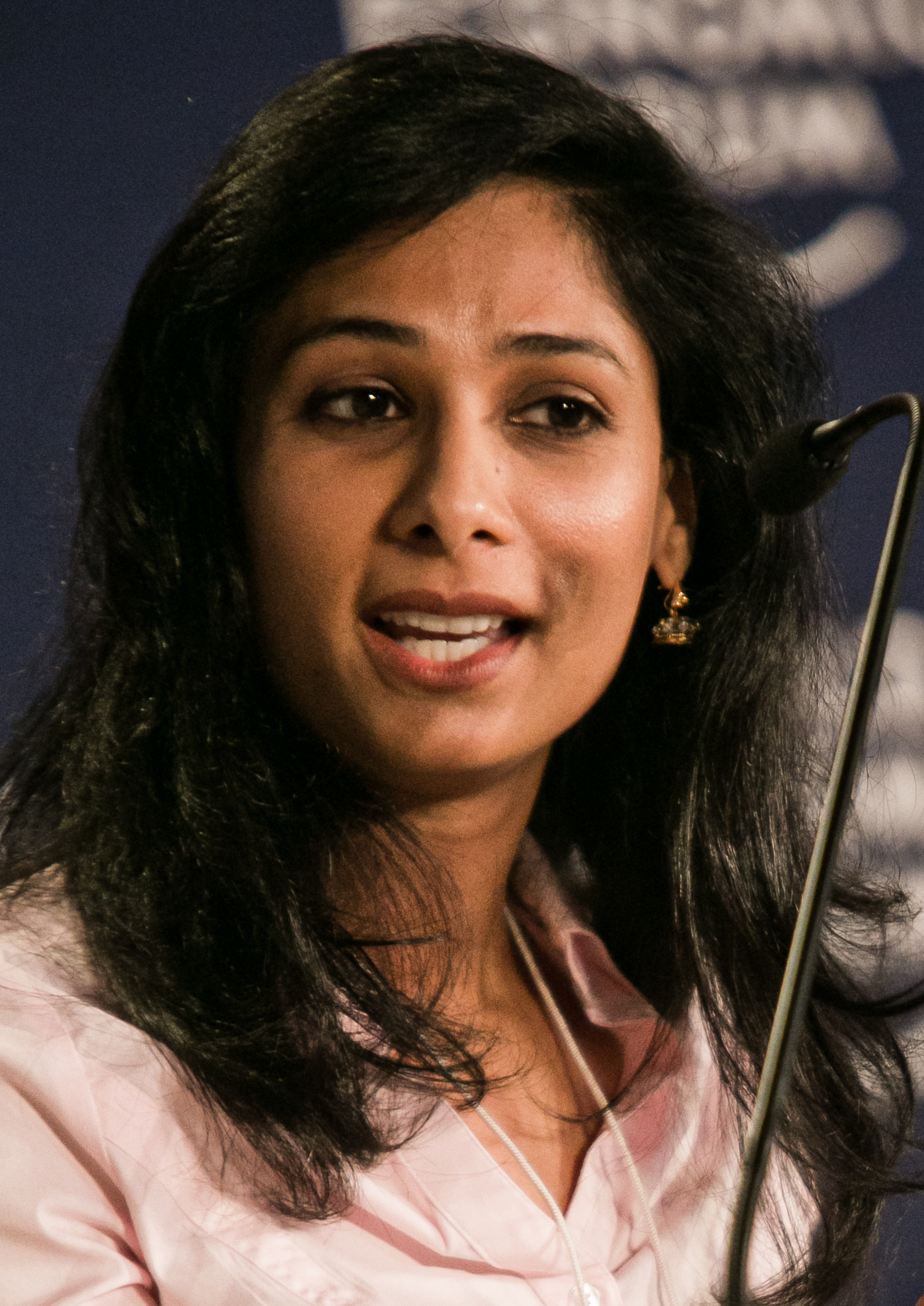
Gita Gopinath

- Isher Judge Ahluwalia, economist
- Ravi Batra, Indian-American economist
- Anjali Bhardwaj, Indian social activist working on issues of transparency and accountability
- Ashwani Mahajan, Indian economist and national convener of Swadeshi Jagran Manch
- Dhritiman Chatterjee, actor in Black, Pratidwandi
- Prabhu Chawla, editor of India Today
- Brahma Chellaney, geostrategist and columnist
- Parag Kumar Das, human rights activist and Assamese journalist assassinated in 1996
- Amitav Ghosh, author
- Subir Gokarn, former deputy governor of the Reserve Bank of India
- Omkar Goswami, chairman and founder, CERG Advisory
- Ramachandra Guha, author, historian and columnist
- Ashok Gulati, Indian agricultural economist
- Nistula Hebbar, journalist and political correspondent
- Anshula Kant, chief financial officer and managing director of the World Bank Group
- Ashwani Mahajan, national co-convener of Swadeshi Jagaran Manch (SJM)
- Amit Mitra, FICCI
- Bingu wa Mutharika, former president of Malawi
- V. R. Panchamukhi
- Sat Parashar, Indian financial management expert and business education administrator
- Om Prakash, historian
- Vidya Rao, Hindustani classical singer and writer
- Prannoy Roy, media figure, founder of NDTV
- Kuladhar Saikia, Director General of Assam Police
- Rajan Saxena, Indian management expert
- Mihir Shah, Indian economist and former member of the erstwhile Planning Commission of India
- Sanjay Subrahmanyam, noted Indian historian
- Paranjoy Guha Thakurta, Indian journalist, political commentator, author and documentary film maker
- Usha Thorat, Reserve Bank of India
- Piers Vitebsky, British anthropologist

== Academics ==
- Dilip Abreu, game theorist and professor of economics at New York University
- Bina Agarwal, prize-winning development economist and professor of development economics and environment at the Global Development Institute at The University of Manchester
- Arindam Banik, Associated Cement Companies Chair Professor at International Management Institute, editor, Global Business Review, former director of IMI Kolkata
- Amitava Bose
- Maitreesh Ghatak, professor of economics, LSE
- Sayantan Ghosal, Adam Smith Chair in Political Economy, University of Glasgow
- Gita Gopinath, professor of economics, Harvard University and deputy managing director of the IMF
- Reetika Khera, one of India's leading development economists
- Shailendra Raj Mehta, president and director of MICA
- Nadeem Naqvi
- Prasanta K. Pattanaik, professor of economics, University of California, Riverside, US
- Rajan Saxena, management expert, Padma Shri awardee
- Arunava Sen, professor of economics at Indian Statistical Institute
- Gita Sen, adjunct professor at Harvard University and professor emeritus at the Indian Institute of Management Bangalore; feminist scholar and specialist in international population policy
- Suresh Tendulkar, former chief of the National Statistical Commission and chairman of Prime Minister Manmohan Singh's Economic Advisory Council (PMEAC) from 2004 to 2008
- Kamta Prasad, former professor of economics, Indian Institute for Public Administration and IIT Kanpur
- Sanjay Subrahmanyam, one of the world's leading historians. He holds the Irving and Jean Stone Endowed Chair in Social Sciences at UCLA.

== Government and administration ==
- Pulok Chatterji, 11th Principal Secretary to the Prime Minister of India
- Bibek Debroy, chairman of the Economic Advisory Council to the Prime Minister (EAC-PM)
- Ruchira Kamboj, Ambassador and Permanent Representative of India to UNESCO Paris
- Pramod Kumar Misra, Principal Secretary to the Prime Minister of India
- Poonam Gupta (Economist), deputy governor of Reserve Bank of India
- Ashok Mitra, former Chief Economic Adviser to the Government of India
- Vinay Sheel Oberoi, Ambassador and Permanent Representative of India to UNESCO
- Iswar Prasanna Hazarika, former member of the Lok Sabha, director of NTPC, MMTC etc.
- Vinod Rai, 11th Comptroller and Auditor General of India
- Pankaj Saran, Deputy National Security Adviser of India
- N. K. Singh, chairman of 15th Finance Commission
- Sujatha Singh, former foreign secretary of India
- Pradeep Kumar Sinha, IAS, principal advisor to the prime minister of India
- Ashok Lahiri, economist and 4th vice chairman of the NITI Aayog.

== See also ==
- Rameshwari Photocopy Service shop copyright case
