= Uberoi =

Uberoi is a surname. Notable people with the surname include:

- Anahita Uberoi (born 1967), Indian actress
- J. P. S. Uberoi (1934–2024), Indian sociologist
- Mohan Singh Uberoi Diwana (1899–1984), Indian scholar of Punjabi literature and poet
- Neha Uberoi (born 1986), American tennis player
- Shikha Uberoi (born 1983), Indian-American player
