= Ashwani =

Ashwani is a given name. Notable people with the name include:

- Ashwani Kumar (born 1952), Indian politician
- Ashwani Kumar (police officer) (born 1950), Indian politician
- Ashwani Kumar Sharma (Punjab politician), Indian politician
- Ashwani Kumar Sharma (J&K politician), Indian politician
- Ashwani Lohani, Indian businessman
- Ashwani Mahajan, Indian economist
- Ashwani Sekhri, Indian politician
