= Narayani Gupta =

Indian Historian

- Born: Narayani Menon; 13 November 1942; Patna, Bihar
- Citizenship: Indian
- Occupation: Historian
- Known for: History of Delhi
- Board member of: Member, Delhi Urban Arts Commission under Ministry of Housing and Urban Affairs
- Spouse: Partha Sarathi Gupta
- Children: Himadri Shikhar Gupta(Son), Niharika Gupta(Daughter)
- Relatives: Ashoka Gupta (Mother-in-Law), MGK Menon (Uncle), Sarada Menon (Aunt)
- Awards: Homi Bhabha Fellowship (1982), UGC Career Award (1992)

Academic background
- Education: BA, MA, PhD
- Alma mater: Indraprastha College for Women (BA); Somerville College, Oxford (MA) Delhi University (PhD)
- Doctoral advisor: Prof B.B. Misra; Prof R.L. Shukla
- Influences: Richard Cobb; Janet Abu-Lughod

Academic work
- Discipline: Historian
- Sub-discipline: Urban History
- School or tradition: Liberalism
- Main interests: Architectural Conservation

Narayani Gupta (born 13 November 1942) is an Indian historian who was a professor of history at Jamia Millia Islamia University, New Delhi. She taught at Indraprastha College from 1966 before joining Jamia Millia Islamia University in 1988. From 1991 to 1995, she taught at the TVB School of Habitat Studies. She is the author of works on urban history, particularly the history of Delhi.

== Biography ==
Gupta is the third daughter of Narayani Menon and VKR Menon, an Indian Civil Services officer in Bihar state of British India. Growing up in Delhi after 1946, she could observe the rapid changes in the social fabric post-Partition and the planning of Independent India. She is married to historian Partha Sarathi Gupta.

== Academic contributions ==
Her book Delhi between Two Empires, based on her doctoral thesis, was called "groundbreaking" by reviewers. She is a founder-member and former president (1986–88) of the Conservation Society of Delhi which emerged from the Environment Group. She was a member of Delhi's Urban Art Commission from 1992 to 1995, and again from 2004 to 2007. From 2004 to 2012, she was associated with the Indian National Trust for Cultural Heritage, as consultant on their Heritage Education programmes and their documentation centre.

Gupta has written history books for the National Book Trust and Orient Longman, and in 2019 edited a series of books on UNESCO world heritage sites. She headed the committee on middle school social science textbooks for the Delhi SCERT in 2002-04, was a member of NCERT's National Focus Group on Teaching of Social Sciences, and editor of the History textbook for Class 11 (2005).

She was honoured with a festschrift, Cities, Citizens, Classrooms and Beyond: Essays for Narayani Gupta, published in 2024 and edited by Partho Datta, Mukul Kesavan and Kumkum Roy.

== Activism and writing ==
She is a columnist for newspapers and online magazines like Indian Express, The Hindu, Times of India and writes about historical matters and contemporary history.

She remains actively engaged with the conservation of Delhi's monuments and urban landscape. She is one of the people who took a stand on the issue of the redevelopment of Central Vista and filed a case in Supreme Court against it.
