= Partha Sarathi Gupta =

Indian professor 1934 – 1999

Professor Partha Sarathi Gupta
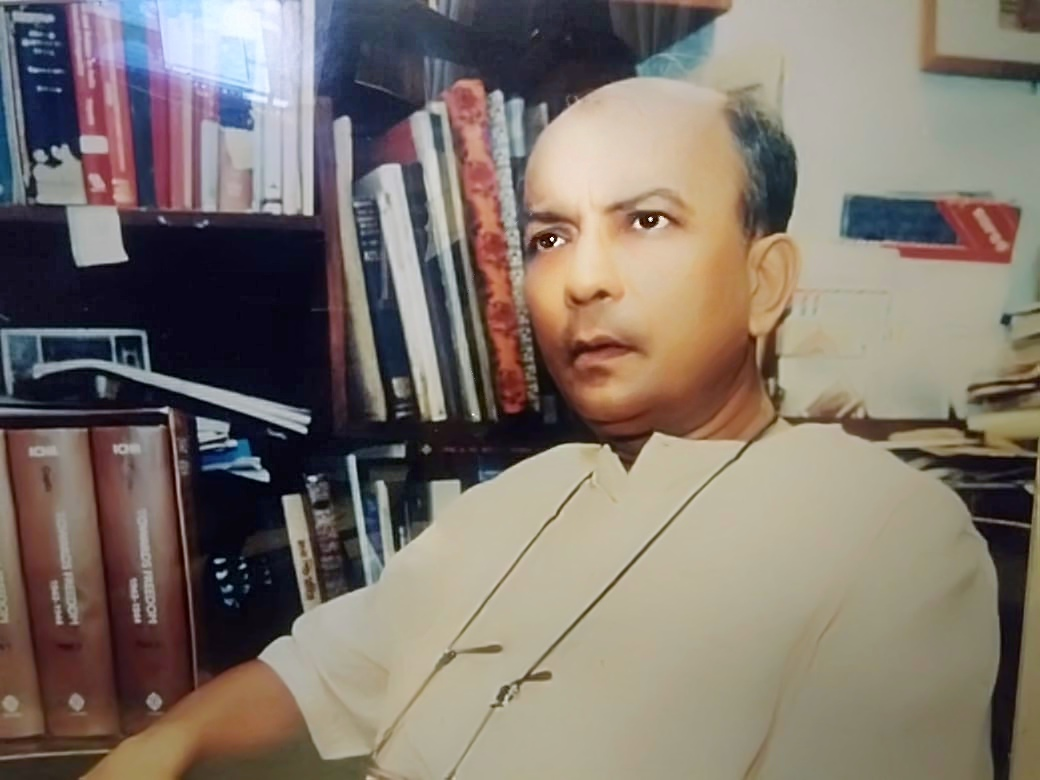
- Born: 5 August 1934; Guptipara, Bengal Presidency, British Raj (now in West Bengal))
- Died: 10 August 1999 (aged 65); New Delhi
- Occupations: Professor of British and European History, Delhi University
- Title: Ex-President, Indian History Congress
- Awards: Ishan Uday; Smuts Fellow in Commonwealth History at Cambridge University (1980-1981); Fellow of the Royal Historical Society; Editorial Advisory Board Member of the Journal of Imperial and Commonwealth History

Academic background
- Education: BA, MA, M Phil, PhD
- Alma mater: Ballygunge Government High School; Presidency College, Calcutta (BA); Queen's College, Oxford (MA, PhD)
- Thesis: (1956)
- Doctoral advisor: Henry Pelling
- Other advisors: Christopher Hill; Keith Thomas

Academic work
- Era: 1914-1964
- Discipline: Historian
- Sub-discipline: Imperialism And The British Labour Movement, Commonwealth History, English Civil War, Documents For The Movement For Independence In India,
- School or tradition: Liberalism
- Notable works: Imperialism And The British Labour Movement, 1914-1964; Towards Freedom: Documents For The Movement For Independence In India, 1943-44

Partha Sarathi Gupta (5 August 1934 – 10 August 1999) was an Indian professor of British and European history at Delhi University and president of the Indian History Congress. He was firstborn son of Ashoka Gupta and Saibal Gupta, an Indian Civil Services officer in Bengal state of British India. His childhood memory of watching Mahatma Gandhi's walk through riot-torn Noakhali in 1946 where his mother joined in the walk had a long-lasting impact. He was awarded Eshan scholarship for the highest marks in West Bengal in Presidency College, Calcutta. Fellow students included Nobel Memorial Prize in Economic Sciences winner Amartya Sen and member of planning commission Sukhamoy Chakravarty in 1953.

Partha was a member of the Indian Council of Historical Research. He was Smuts Fellow in Commonwealth History at Cambridge University (1980-1981), and directeur d'études at the Maison des Sciences de l'Homme in Paris in 1989.

== Biography ==
Partho was born in 1934 in Guptipara, Bengal of British India which is currently in the district of Hooghly in West Bengal. His father, Shaibal Kumar Gupta was in Indian Civil Services and mother Ashoka Gupta was a well known social worker who worked closely with Mahatma Gandhi during riots of Navakhali. He is the grandson of great Bengali writer of early 20th century Jyotirmoyee Devi.

=== Early life ===
He was a brilliant student and topped state matriculation examination in the year 1949 from Ballygunge Government High School. He then joined Presidency College Calcutta and graduated in history by getting highest marks and was given prestigious Eshan scholarship awarded for the highest marks in West Bengal. Fellow students that year included Amartya Sen and Sukhamoy Chakravarty. He went to England to continue his higher studies from Queen's College, Oxford University. He graduated in modern history specialising in the English Civil War. He worked closely with his teachers like Christopher Hill and Keith Thomas. He became friends with his batchmates Raphael Samuel and Peter Sedgwick. His British late-19th-century British railwaymen's union thesis earned him a Doctorate degree under the supervision of Henry Pelling.

=== Teaching positions ===
Gupta in the year 1960, joined Burdwan University in History Department briefly before joining Delhi University as a reader. He was teaching economic history before he became a reader in European and British history.

=== Marriage and children ===
He married Narayani Gupta who taught history at Indraprastha College for Women and joined the Jamia Millia Islamia University in 1986. She was a consultant with Indian National Trust for Art and Cultural Heritage. Her research has been on urban history, particularly that of Delhi. She has many books to her credit. She was a founder member of the Conservation Society of Delhi and has been a member of the Delhi Urban Art Commission. She authored books Delhi between Empires 1803-1931, Society, Government and Urban Growth; Delhi Then & Now; and has co-authored Beato's Delhi: 1857 and Beyond. She has been an advisor for Delhi: The Built Heritage, A Listing, Intach, 2000.

Together they have a son Himadri Shikhar Gupta and a daughter Niharika Gupta.

- Prof Himadri Gupta, alumnus of prestigious IIT Kanpur and Max Planck Institute of Colloids and Interfaces (MPIKG) at Potsdam (Germany) is professor at Institute of Bioengineering and School of Engineering and Materials Science, Queen Mary University of London.
- Niharika Gupta is a Rhodes Scholar and alumnus of Delhi University and Balliol College, University of Oxford. She worked as the Director of Research at Sahapedia She is currently working at International Research Division of India International Centre, New Delhi

== Published works ==
Imperialism And The British Labour Movement, 1914-1964
Towards Freedom: Documents For The Movement For Independence In India, 1943-44 Power, Politics and the People: Studies in British Imperialism and Indian Nationalism (New Delhi: Permanent Black, 2002) Edited, with Anirudh Deshpande. The British Raj and Its Indian Armed Forces, 1857-1939. New Delhi: Oxford University Press, 2002.

== Honours, decorations, awards and distinctions ==
- Eshan scholarship awarded for the highest marks in West Bengal
- Member of the Indian Council of Historical Research
- Smuts Fellow in Commonwealth History at Cambridge University
- Directeur d'études at the Maison des Sciences de l'Homme in Paris
- Fellow of the Royal Historical Society
