= T. T. Sreekumar =

Indian writer and professor

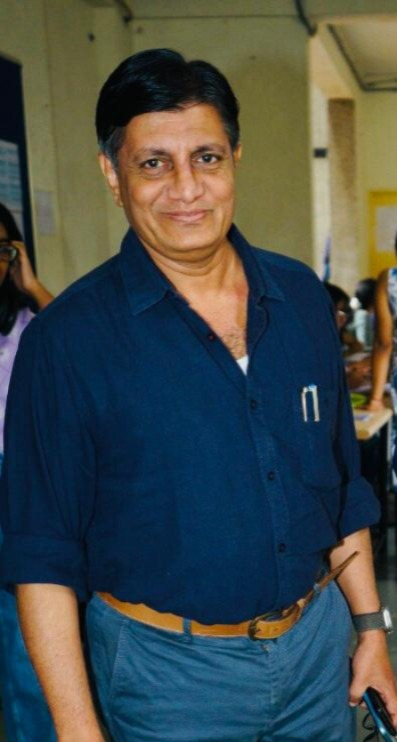

Dr. T. T. Sreekumar is an Indian writer, orator, social and literary critic, and political analyst. He is a professor at the School of Interdisciplinary Studies, English and Foreign Languages University (EFLU), Hyderabad, and serves as the director of the Educational Multimedia Research Center (EMRC). Sreekumar is a bilingual author with published works in Malayalam and English and has been writing a fortnightly column in the Malayalam daily Madhyamam since 2014.

== Education ==
Sreekumar completed an M.Phil in Applied economics from Jawaharlal Nehru University (JNU), Delhi, and earned his PhD in Science, Technology, and Society (STS) from the Hong Kong University of Science and Technology (HKUST).

== Career ==
Sreekumar began his academic career in 1996 as a lecturer at the Institute of Management in Government, Thiruvananthapuram. He later served as a doctoral instructor at HKUST before joining the National University of Singapore as faculty in 2004. From 2013 to 2016, he was a professor and chair of the Fellows Program and Head of Digital Communications at MICA, Ahmedabad. In 2017, he joined the School of Interdisciplinary Studies at EFLU as a professor.

His research focuses on topics such as Asian modernity, development, e-governance, mobile ecology, and rural network societies. He critically examines the sociopolitical implications of information technology and new media. His book ICTs and Development in India: Perspectives on the Rural Network Society explores the limitations of ICT4D (Information and Communication Technologies for Development) in neoliberal contexts.

== Writings ==
Sreekumar is a prolific writer in both English and Malayalam. His books in Malayalam cover a wide range of topics, including postmodernism, history, modernity, and sociopolitical critiques. He is also the author of several works in English, including ICTs and Development in India: Perspectives on the Rural Network Society and Urban Process in Kerala: 1900–1981. His regular columns in Madhyamam provide critical perspectives on the sociopolitical environment in Kerala.

== Awards ==
In 2020, Sreekumar received the C. B. Kumar Endowment Award from the Kerala Sahitya Academy for his book Vayanayum Prathirodhavum (Reading and Resistance). in 2025, he received the Dr. C.P. Menon Award instituted by the C. P. Menon Trust for his book Navothana Charithra Darshanam (The Historical Philosophy of Renaissance). In 2026, he was awarded the 13th Kerala Sahityotsav Award.

== List of Books ==
=== English ===
- ICTs and Development in India: Perspectives on the Rural Network Society, London: Anthem Press, 2011
- Urban Process in Kerala: 1900–1981. Thiruvananthapuram: Centre for Development Studies, 1993

=== Malayalam ===
1. Oru Indian Communistinte Smaranakal (Sampoornnam) K. Damodaran/Tari Ali, Editor and Translator (Memoirs of an Indian Communist, K. Damodaran/ Tariq Ali) Prasakthi Publications, 2026
2. Habermas: Rshtreeyam, Darshanam, Vimrshanam, Editor (Habermas: Politics, Philosophy and Criticism) Kozhikode: Pustaka Prasadhaka Sangham, 2026.
3. Algorithm, Adhvanam, Adhikaram: Nimmithabudhiyum Digital Mooladhanvum (Algorith, Labour, Hegemony: Artificial Intelligence and Digital Capital). Thiruvananthapuram: Chintha Publishers, 2025
4. Parikalpanakalude Samskarika Rashtreeyam (Cultural Politics of Concepts). Kottayam: D.C Books, 2025.
5. Navothana Charithra Darshanam (The Historical Philosophy of Renaissance). Kozhikode: Mathrubhumi Books, 2024.
6. Rashtram, Charithram, Bhaumarashtreeyam: Samskarika Vishakalanangal (The Nation, History and Geopolitics: Cultural Analyses). Kozhikode: Pustaka Prasadhaka Sangham, 2024.
7. Naravamshashaasthra Kurippukalile Karl Marx (Karl Marx's Ethnological Notebooks). Kozhikode: Progress Books, 2023.
8. Eka civilcodinte Vimarshanadharakal, editor, (Critical Approaches to Uniform Civil Code). Kozhikode: Pustaka Prasadhaka Sangham, 2023.
9. Swathathryasamarangalude Sookshmaraashtreeyam (The Micropolitics of Liberation Struggles). Kozhikode: Progress Books, 2022.
10. Posthuman Vicharalokangal: Shaasthram, Saundaryam, Mruthyu Rashtreeyam (Posthuman Thinking: Science, Aesthetics, Necropolitics). Kozhikode: Pustaka Prasadhaka Sangham, 2021.
11. Republicinte Sakshathkarangal (Realizing the Republic). Trissur: Flame Books, 2021.
12. Samskarathinte Samaramukhangal (Battlegrounds of Culture). Mavelikkara: Quivive Text, 2020.
13. Charithravum Samskaravum (History and Culture). Trivandrum: Bhasha Institute, 2019.
14. Punarvayanakalile Mraxism (Rereadings of Marxism). Kottayam: DC Books, 2019.
15. Palaayanangal: Adhiniveshangalum Bhookhandaanthara Raashtreeyavum (Diaspora: Domination and Intercontinental Politics) Pathanamthitta: Prasakthi Publications, 2019.
16. Vayanayum Prathirodhavum (Reading and Resistance). Kozhikkode: Olive Publications, 2017.
17. Navasamoohikatha: Sasthram, Charithram, Rashtreeyam (New Sociality: Science, History and Politics). Kozhikkode: Pratheeksha Books (2011)
18. Civil Samoohavum Idathupakshavum (Civil Society and the Left). Kozhikkode: Olive Publications, 2007.
19. Kadalarivukal, editor, (Sea lores) Kottayam: DC Books, 2004.
20. Katha Ithuvare: Keralavikasana Samvadangal, editor, (The Story Utill Now: The Kerala Development Debates). Kottayam: DC Books 2003.
21. Charithravum Adhunikathayum ( History and Modernity). Kottayam: DC Books 2001.
22. Utharadhunikathakkappuram (Beyond Post modernism). Kottayam: DC Books, 2000.
23. Krishi Geetha: Chollum Vayanayum, editor, (Krishi Geetha: Text and Readings). Thrissur: Nattariv Padana Kendram, 1999.
24. Aanavanilayavum Vikasanarashtreeyavum, editor, (Nuclear Reactors and Developmental Politics). Alappuzha: Samoohika Padana Kendram, 1991.

== Editorial roles ==
Sreekumar has served as the chief editor of the Journal of Creative Communications (2013–2017) and as associate editor of Media Asia (2014–2019). He is currently the editor of the International Journal of Media Studies, published by EFLU.
