= Harit Nagpal =

Indian businessman

- Born: 2 November 1961 (age 65); New Delhi, India
- Education: Panjab University (B.E.); University of Delhi (M.B.A.)
- Occupations: Managing Director and Chief Executive Officer of Tata Play, formerly known as Tata Sky
- Spouse: Poonam Nagpal
- Children: Maanya Nagpal, Arsh Nagpal

Harit Nagpal (born 2 November 1961) is the Managing Director and Chief Executive Officer of Tata Play, formerly known as Tata Sky, since August 2010. He has over four decades of experience in the industry.

== Career ==
Nagpal spent his first 15 working years in packaged goods industry with brands like Lakme, Marico and Pepsi. At the turn of the millennium he moved over to the services sector and worked with Shoppers Stop and Hutch/Orange/Vodafone before joining Tata Play (formerly, Tata Sky) in 2010.

He took over as Managing Director and Chief Executive Officer of Tata Sky in August 2010. Before that he was Global Director Marketing at Vodafone. He had also served as Director of Marketing and Business at Vodafone India Limited.

He co-authored a case study on the subject of disruption "Tata Sky: Responding to a disruptive technology" which is now a part of the curriculum at the London Business School.

He has authored two books, "Adapt - To thrive, not just survive" and "Pivot - Between two options pick the third"

== Early life and education ==
Nagpal graduated in Chemical Engineering from Panjab University, Chandigarh in 1983 and followed it up with an MBA from Faculty of Management Studies, University of Delhi in 1985.

He is listed as an illustrious alumni of Panjab University and of Faculty of Management Studies, University of Delhi.

He was born in New Delhi, India and spent his childhood between New Delhi and Roorkee, Uttarakhand. He is married with two children, Maanya Nagpal and Arsh Nagpal.
