= Ashoka Gupta =

Indian politician (1912–2008)

- Born: November 1912
- Died: 8 July 2008 (aged 95); Kolkata, West Bengal, India
- Occupation: Social worker
- Spouse: Shaibal Kumar Gupta
- Children: Partha Sarathi Gupta(son); Shakuntala Dasgupta (daughter); Kasturi Gupta Menon (daughter); Bishakha (Apala) Egan (daughter)
- Parent(s): Kiran Chandra Sen; Jyotirmoyee Devi

Ashoka Gupta (November 1912 – 8 July 2008) was an Indian freedom fighter and social worker. She was the founder of Mahila Seva Samity, member of the All India Women's Conference and president of Indian Society for Sponsorship and Adoption. She took part in rescue and relief operation during the Noakhali riots.

== Early life ==
Gupta was born the fourth of six children and second daughter to Kiran Chandra Sen and Jyotirmoyee Devi. Her father died at the age of six, and she was brought up by her mother, who struggled to bring her up along with five other siblings. She attended St. Margaret's school in Kolkata. She stood first among the girls in the matriculation examination. She graduated from Bethune College with honours in Mathematics. At the age of 20, she was married to Saibal Gupta, an I.C.S. officer.

== Career ==
In 1936, Gupta became a member of the All India Women's Conference, founded in 1927. She actively participated in setting up branches of AIWC and various welfare organizations. During the Bengal famine of 1943, she took part in relief work in Bankura. In 1945, she moved to Chittagong where her husband was transferred. In 1946, during the Noakhali genocide, she led a team of relief workers on behalf of the Chittagong branch of the AIWC, for rescue and relief operations in Noakhali. After the Partition, she moved to Kolkata along with her husband.

After the Partition, she engaged herself in refugee rehabilitation, child literacy and uplift of rural women and tribals. She was the chairperson of the West Bengal State Social Welfare Advisory Board from 1955 to 1959. In 1959, Gupta became a member of the Central Social Welfare Board, at the suggestion of Bidhan Chandra Roy and Durgabai Deshmukh. In 1964, he took part in relief work among the Bengali Hindu refugees Mana and other camps in the Dandakaranya.

She was the State Commissioner (Guides) from 1956 to 1967 and the State Chief Commissioner of The Bharat Scouts and Guides from 1968 to 1974.

She was a fellow of the senate of the University of Calcutta from 1948 to 1953. She was associated with the Palli Sangathan Vibhag of Vishwabharati University from 1956. In 1965, she became a member of the executive council of the university and remained there till 1973.

== Honours ==
In 2007, Gupta was bestowed upon an honorary D.Litt. in recognition of her work for the cause of women and children. She was also awarded the Jamnalal Bajaj Award in 2007.

== Publications ==
- Noakhalir Durjoger Dine
