= Sandip Das =

Indian corporate executive in the telecom business

- Education: National Institute of Technology Rourkela; Faculty of Management Studies, University of Delhi

Sandip Das is an Indian corporate executive in the telecom business. He serves as a senior advisor at Analysys Mason and a member of the advisory board of Sterlite Technologies. He has served as Deputy Managing Director of Hutchison Essar (now Vodafone India), Executive Director and Chief Executive Officer of Maxis Communications, and headed Reliance Jio Infocomm.

== Career ==
Das began his career with the Indian consumer durable giant Usha International, Shriram Group, where he started as a Management Trainee and left as Joint Divisional Manager after 10 years of service. He then spent five years as the Franchise Head of Toyota cars and Hino trucks with the Al Futtaim Motors of the Al Futtaim Group in Dubai, UAE.

After returning to India, Das joined Hutchison Essar, then known as Hutchison Max Telecom where he started the company's operations in 1994 and was its first employee. He spent 13 years in the company, including his time as CEO of Hutchison Max Telecom's paging division, subsequently made COO of Hutchison Max Telecom in June 1998 where HTML was an established market leader in Mobile Services and later as the Deputy Managing Director and Director on the Board of Hutchison Essar Limited. During his time with Hutchison, Das helped build the company. In an interview in May 2009, Das said, "I started with Hutchison in 1994. When I left, it had 25 million subscribers. Two months later, the company was sold for US$22 billion to Vodafone. I feel very proud of this achievement as I started the company’s operations from scratch".

In 2007, Das was appointed the Chief Executive Officer of Maxis Communications Berhad, the largest telecommunications operator in Malaysia.

Besides being the Executive Director and CEO of Maxis Communications Berhad, Das also served as Director on the Board of Aircel in India. In addition, Das served the Boards of Sri Lanka Telecom PLC and Mobitel (Sri Lanka) and was also a board member of Bridge Mobile Pte Ltd (Bridge Alliance), a strategic alliance of regional telecommunications provider. He also served for two years on the Board of the Global GSM Development Fund and was the Chairman of the Confederation of Indian Industries (CII) Service Industry Panel.

In November 2009, Das led the Maxis's re-listing on the Malaysian Stock Exchange (Bursa Malaysia) in what was Southeast Asia's biggest IPO worth over US$3 billion. In 2010, Das led Maxis controlled subsidiary, Aircel in India, in the successful third generation (3G) and broadband wireless access (BWA) spectrum auctions where Aircel successfully bid for 3G spectrum in 13 of the 22 telecom circles in India and BWA spectrum in 8 circles.

In May 2013, he quit Maxis to head Reliance Jio Infocomm, Mukesh Ambani's 4G venture. In 2014 he quit Jio to a mentorship role in Reliance Retail. In 2015 he quit Reliance to join telecom and media consulting firm Analysys Mason where he served as a Senior Adviser. In 2016 he joined Sterlite Technologies' advisory board.

== Awards & recognitions ==
Das is listed in the Global Telecoms Business GTB Power100 list as one of the 100 most powerful people in the telecoms industry worldwide in 2010, 2011, 2012 and 2014. In 2012, Sandip was also voted Best CEO in Malaysia by Finance Asia Best Managed Companies Awards 2012. He was recognised as one of the "Spartans of Telecom" by MyMobile (telecom business editorial), credited for bringing global experience to the Indian telecom field.
