= Faculty of Management Studies (University of Delhi) =

Business school located in New Delhi, India

Coordinates: 28.6841°N 77.2083°E

Faculty of Management Studies – University of Delhi
- Type: Public business school
- Established: 1954; 72 years ago
- Accreditation: NAAC
- Academic affiliations: University of Delhi
- Dean: A. Venkat Raman
- Location: Central Delhi, Delhi, India
- Website: fms.edu

Faculty of Management Studies – University of Delhi (FMS Delhi or The Red Building of Dreams) is a business school located in Delhi, India. It was established in 1954 under the umbrella of the University of Delhi and is often cited as one of the best business schools in India. In 2025, FMS was ranked 2nd best MBA program in the country by the Indian Institutional Ranking Framework. The institute was started at the Delhi School of Economics premises under Dean A. Dasgupta of the Delhi College of Engineering (DCE).

The department of commerce of the Delhi College of Engineering (DCE) (now Delhi Technological University (DTU)) was abolished and the Faculty of Management Studies was established.

The first set of professors was trained at the Stanford Graduate School of Business. The institute has since then expanded on the number of management courses available.

== Academics ==
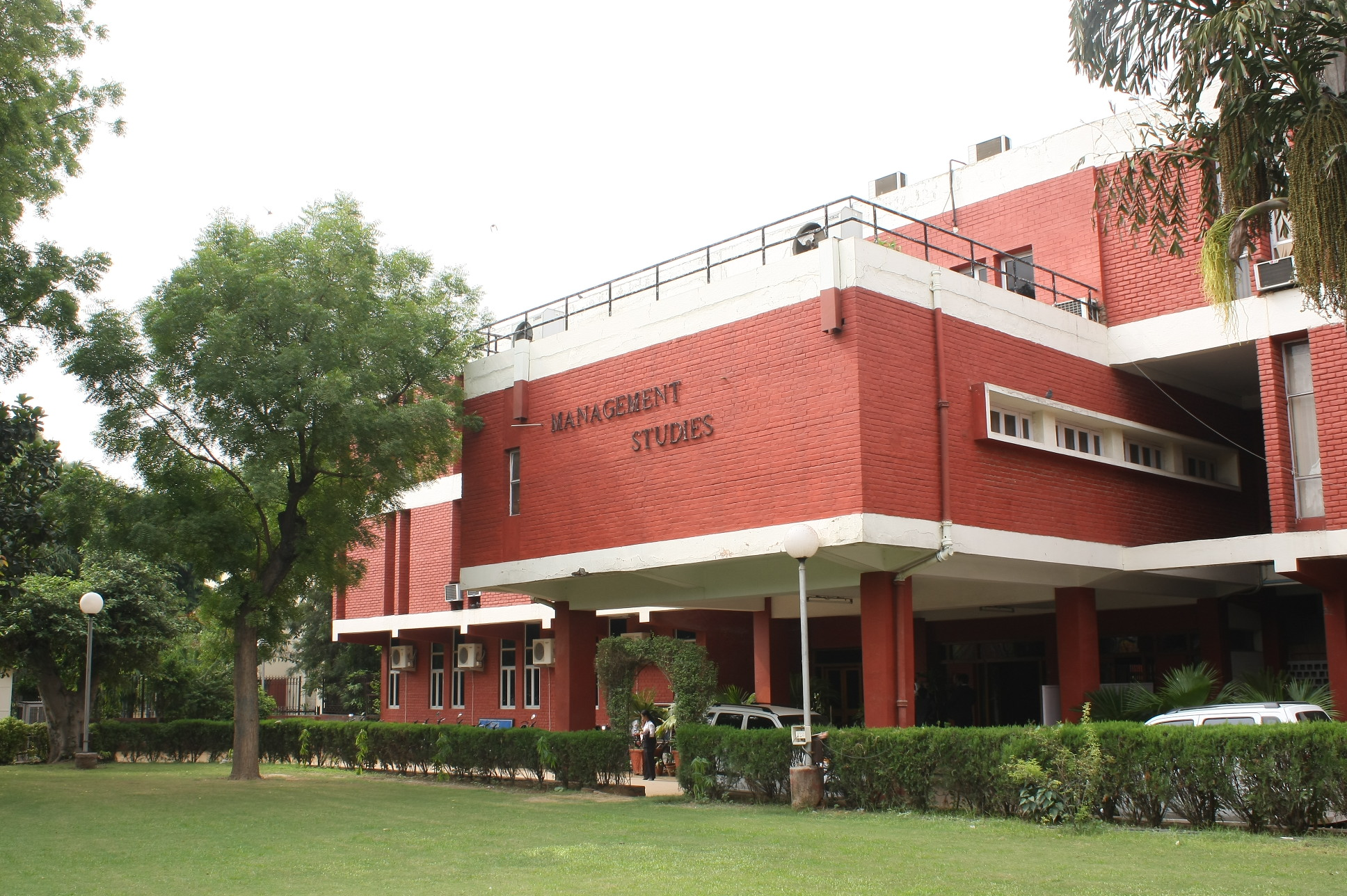
An isometric view of the Red Building of Dreams

FMS offers a full-time MBA, an executive MBA, an executive MBA in health care administration and doctoral programmes.

=== Admissions ===
The admission to the course is done on the basis of score on Common Admission Test (CAT) conducted by the Indian Institutes of Management (IIMs). FMS earlier had its own entrance exam which was discontinued starting in the 2012–14 session. For the doctoral program, the maximum number of seats is 20. The candidates are required to appear in the entrance test conducted every year in November–December. However, candidates falling under some categories are exempted from appearing in this entrance test.

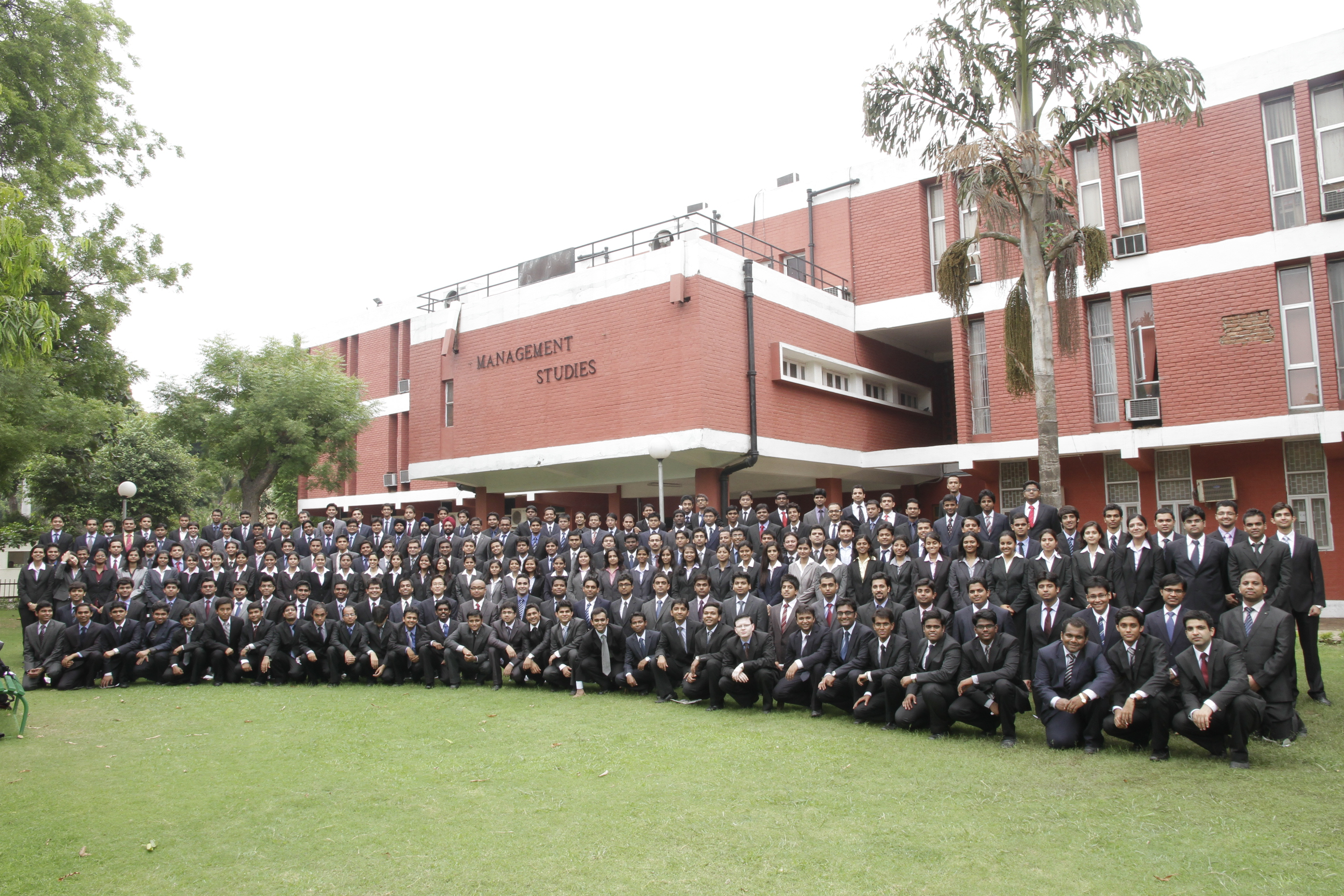
MBA full-time batch of 2014

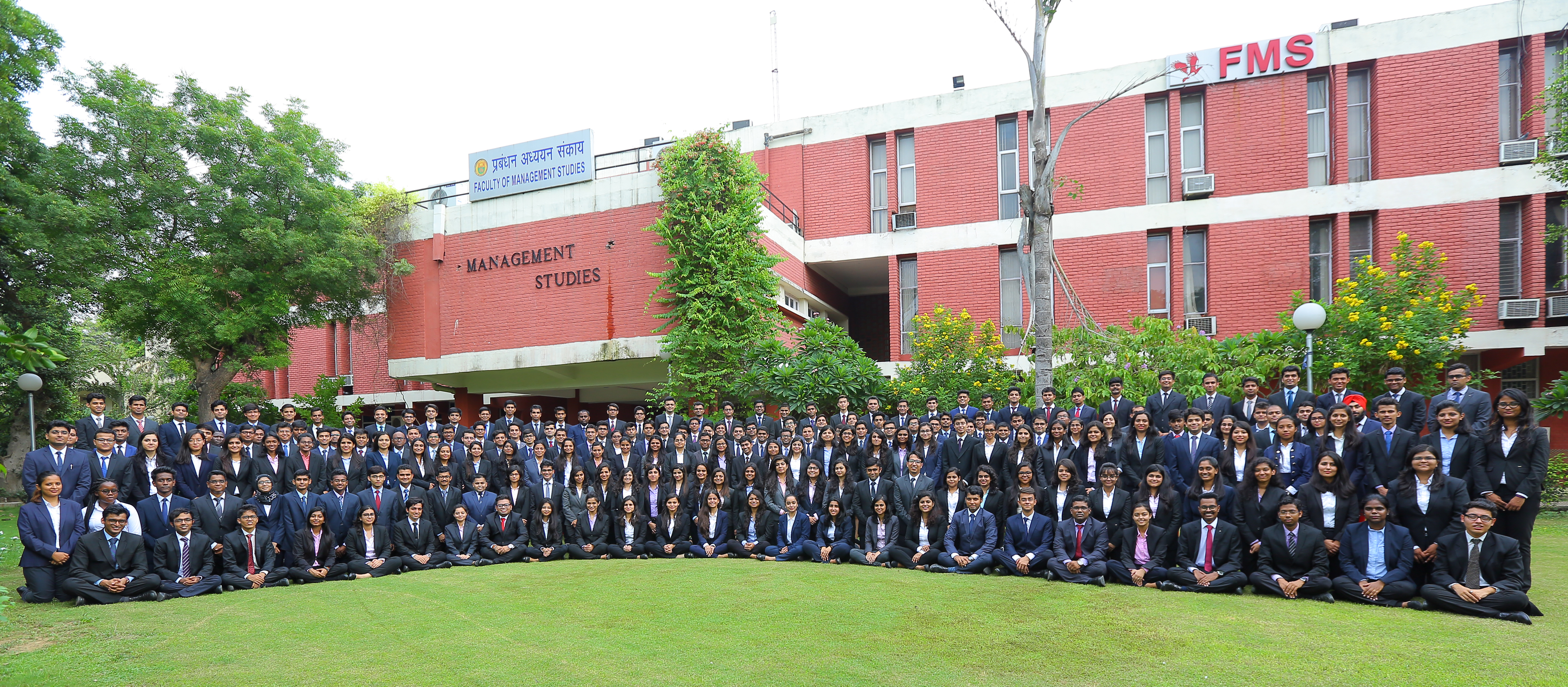
Full time MBA students in class of 2020

== Academic chairs ==
In 2005, the Ministry for Human Resource Development, Govt. of India proposed a new chair in the name of the former Indian Prime Minister Rajiv Gandhi, now known as the Rajiv Gandhi Chair for Technology Management and Innovation (MHRD, GOI) to promote management of innovation. The Industrial Finance Corporation of India Chair is also one of the professional chairs instituted by industry at FMS.

== Rankings ==
FMS Delhi is ranked second in the 2024 IIRF MBA rankings. It is ranked 6th in Career Launcher's rankings and 8th in India Today's rankings.

== Notable alumni ==
- Dharam Gokhool, president of Mauritius (MBA 1975)
- Dinesh Kumar Khara, former chairman, State Bank of India
- Harit Nagpal, managing director and CEO, Tata Sky
- Anurag Srivastava, High Commissioner of India to Mauritius
- Kumar Varun, stand-up comedian, actor, writer, and quizmaster
- Raghav Bahl, editor-in-chief, The Quint
- Rahul Dua, stand-up comedian
- Rajinder Khanna, additional National Security Advisor of India to Government of India
- Sandeep A. Varma, film director and writer
- Sandhya Devanathan, vice president and Head, Meta - India (Facebook)
- Sandip Das, former managing director, Reliance Jio
- Sat Parashar, former head of the Banking Center at the Bahrain Institute of Banking and Finance, former director at the Indian Institutes of Management, and former director of the Indian Institute of Management Indore
