= Centre for Development Studies =

Indian research institution in Trivandrum, Kerala

- Type: Higher Educational Institution
- Established: October 9, 1970; 56 years ago
- Parent institution: Planning and Economic Affairs Department, Government of Kerala
- Accreditation: UGC, NAAC, NIRF
- Affiliations: Jawaharlal Nehru University
- Director: C. Veeramani
- Faculty: More than 20
- Students: Below 100
- Location: Thiruvananthapuram, Kerala, India
- Campus: Urban
- Website: https://cds.edu

The Centre for Development Studies (CDS), Thiruvananthapuram, Kerala, India is a premier Social Science research institute. It is also a higher education institution providing M.A. course in applied economics and PhD course in economics. The institute is internationally reputed for being a centre for advanced learning in economics. Its main objective is to promote research, teaching and training in disciplines relevant to development.

The institute was established on 9 October 1970 by the economist Professor K. N. Raj .

== Overview ==
Set up in 1970 by the late famous economist Professor K. N. Raj, the Centre for Development Studies (CDS) is a self-governing institution known for its research in applied economics and topics germane to socio-economic development, pedagogy, and training programmes. The CDS is housed in Prasanth Nagar in the Thiruvananthapuram city. It is easily accessible by road, rail and air. The 10-acre campus is designed and delivered by renowned architect and builder Padma Shri Laurie Baker . The K. N. Raj Library at CDS is one of the biggest repositories of books in South India with over 138,000 titles in economics and related disciplines and subscribing to over 60 print and 15,600 online professional journals. It has a faculty strength of about 20.

Research at CDS is organised into eleven distinct themes:

1. Culture and Development
2. Decentralisation and Governance
3. Gender and Development
4. Human Development, Health and Education
5. Industry and Trade
6. Innovation and Technology
7. Labour, Employment and Social Security
8. Macroeconomic Performance
9. Migration
10. Plantation Crops
11. Politics and Development

The teaching programme of the CDS includes:

1. A two-year M.A. Programme Applied Economics
2. A four-year Ph.D. Programme in Economics.

All three programmes are affiliated to Jawaharlal Nehru University, New Delhi. The University of Kerala also has recognised CDS as a research centre for its doctoral studies. Besides, it has a number of short-duration occasional training programmes.

== Organisational structure ==
The core financial support to the centre comes from the Government of Kerala and the ICSSR. Reserve Bank of India and the NITI Ayog (formerly Planning Commission of India) have instituted endowment units for research in selected areas at CDS. The Union Ministry of Overseas Indian Affairs has established a migration unit at CDS to study issues relating to international migration from India.

The governance of CDS rests with the Governing Body consisting of academicians from across India.

As of 2026 the chairman of the Governing Body is Professor Sudipto Mundle and the director is Professor C.Veeramani.

== Alumni ==
Alumni of CDS:

Alumni from CDS have held prominent positions in academics, think tanks, NGO/INGO's, journalism, etc. Few notable alumni of CDS are as follows:

- Ashoka Mody – Visiting Professor, Princeton University
- Haseeb Drabu – Finance Minister, J&K
- Mihir Shah – Former Member, Planning Commission, New Delhi
- Rakesh Basant – Professor, IIM- Ahmedabad
- Sanjaya Baru – Honorary Fellow, Centre for Policy Research, New Delhi
- T. T. Sreekumar – Professor, National University of Singapore (NUS)
- T. M. Thomas Isaac – Finance Minister, Govt. of Kerala

== Research ==
=== Culture and Development ===
Studies under this theme have largely been historical. They explore the cultural and ideological bases of development in Kerala and the shifts in culture and ideology that shape particular development outcomes. The history of the shaping of public consent for state-sponsored artificial birth-control, the discursive dimensions of community assertion in development, the sub-nationalist ideology bolstered by developmentalism forming the basis of post-independence Kerala, and the discursive dimensions of gender and development have been actively explored at CDS. These studies have mostly relied on archival research and importantly, textual analysis, as their principal methods. Essentially, they represent interdisciplinary research at CDS which has appeared in a whole range of internationally and nationally renowned research journals across the social sciences and humanities. They examine the intertwining of development, politics, culture, and social institutions in Kerala that significantly shape the people's well-being. Other studies include those on the cultural and historical aspects of women's mobility into politics and paid work. Recent studies include those of the impacts of extraneous cultural flows that shaped Kerala's specific historical experience of socio-political change in the twentieth century facilitated by mobility across colonial and post-colonial geographies.

=== Decentralisation and Governance ===
Since the 1990s when the 73rd and 74th Amendments of the Indian Constitution came into force, decentralisation and local governance have been crucial to questions of welfare and development in India. This coincided with an interest in developing planning from below in ways that deepened democracy in Kerala, and with accelerated urban expansion in Kerala and elsewhere. Also, the coming of decentralised democracy meant the expansion of opportunities for women, both in the elected local bodies through reservations and in self-help groups. Research at CDS has followed these processes from different disciplinary perspectives and different methodological perspectives. Major projects that focused on local level development since the 1990s have been carried out. Studies have ranged from changing institutional structures of local governance, welfare programmes and redistribution, social security, infrastructural development, to local government finances. The Research Unit on Local Self-Government at CDS has been carrying out research on agriculture and local self-government and on environmental challenges in urban areas. Gender has been a key theme in research on local government at CDS. This has included research on elected women leaders in Kerala's rural and urban local bodies, gender budgeting in panchayats, and the state-wide network of women's self-help groups under the Kerala State Poverty Alleviation Mission, the Kudumbashree. Recent work includes research into the opportunities opened by decentralisation for women of the most marginal communities in Kerala and the ways in which these women have availed of them. A small but significant theme that is emergent is about the challenges in urban governance in a rapidly urbanising Kerala. Studies on urban housing schemes implemented by local governments are ongoing.

=== Gender and Development ===
Research in this domain has been quite diverse in terms of themes and disciplinary orientations. At present, there is cross disciplinary and/or interdisciplinary research that brings a gender perspective to bear on problems of labour, livelihoods, politics, health, migration and marriage. Gendered power relations were implicated even when not explicitly probed in the early research at the centre (1970s) on questions of fertility transition and human development. Even as research in the 1980s and 1990s brought a clear focus on women's work and employment, including the implications of wider definitions of work for computing national income, on women in agriculture and fisheries, and on understanding how women made good in the context of large scale male migration to the Middle East. The evolution of the CDS research agenda through critical engagement with earlier perspectives on development has been particularly marked in the case of the research on gender and caste since 2000. Gender in contemporary Kerala has been the focus of significant research. Recent research on gender and politics in Kerala has addressed decentralised governance, feminisation of local governance and student politics in higher educational institutions. Gendered livelihoods have come into focus in the context of self-help initiatives of women even as the persisting low female work participation in India and Kerala has continued to receive attention. There is ongoing work on state policy and the implication of gender and caste / religious identities in international migration of women workers from South India.

=== Human Development, Health and Education ===
Human development continues to be a celebrated theme of enquiry at the centre for the state's paradoxical distinction in this regard which compares with the developed world. The challenge of human development in the state unfolds perspectives like its sustainability in the long run as well as its virtues of inclusion. The shrinking of social sector investment coupled with public provisioning of health and education getting complemented by private provisioning poses a threat to sustainability and furthering of its achievements. Enquiries in the field of Health and education remain beyond their instrumental role in the assessment of human development. Topics of health research span from understanding economic of health and health care to equity, pricing and health system analysis in keeping with the evolving epidemiological transition. The alternative dimensions of health research include assessment of disease burden, modes of care provisioning during ultimate years of life along with concerns of sustaining better health indicators in the event of population ageing that is underway. With an evolving public-private mix in the provisioning of health care, health care decision making in consideration of cost and quality has been another prominent engagement in the field of health research. Allied topics like under-nutrition, dietary diversification as well as over/under utilisation of health care are also examined towards commenting upon the healthy makeup of the society. Similarly, works relating to the theme of education involves assessment of educational progress with its varied facets of characteristic inclusion, connections with the emerging labour market and educated unemployment, etc. Issues concerning quality of education, higher education and technical education too are highlights of centre's work in the field of education. The significance of enquiries in these two vital areas of human capability needs strengthening with theoretical formulations based on economic principles beyond the empirics that have been our strength till date.

=== Industry and Trade ===
Issues related to industry, trade and investments comprise one of the core areas of research at the centre. Research related to industry specifically look into various aspects including performance of the Indian corporate sector, role of MNCs in Indian manufacturing sector, spillover effects of FDI inflows, implications of Global Value Chain, mergers and acquisitions, etc. There have been a number of studies specific to sectors like electronics, pharmaceutical, capital goods, paper, tea, etc. Another set of studies analyse issues like frugal innovation, STI policies, R&D tax incentives and IPR policy. Issues like competition policy, corporate governance, regional concentration and urban formation, diffusion of automation, innovation, disinvestments and CSR have also been well researched upon.

=== Innovation and Technology ===
The role of innovation in fostering and sustaining economic growth of nation states is now fairly well established. Innovation is the commercial introduction of new processes and products, essentially by firms. There are two different aspects of innovation that has merited the attention of researchers. First, is the generation of innovation and second is its diffusion within the economy. It was initially believed that the generation and diffusion of innovation happened in splendid isolation by the firm through its investments in R&D. However, towards the beginning of the 1990s, this view of generation and diffusion of innovation has undergone many radical changes. A number of research studies reflective these five concerns or dimensions are currently undertaken at the centre.

=== Labour, Employment and Social Security ===
Research in CDS on this theme has a long history with a wide canvass, that is continuously evolving both in terms of research themes and methodological approaches. In line with the prevailing economic structures of early 1970s research in CDS had contextualised the structural transformation including agrarian transformation in Kerala and focused on questions of agrarian structure and labour relations; emerging industrial workforce and industrial relations; and labour market outcomes.

=== Macroeconomic performance ===
Studies under this theme can be classified into those focusing on long term macroeconomic performance of Indian economy and those analysing short run macroeconomic issues such as monetary policy and inflation. Studies belonging to the first category focused on issues like long term growth performance of Indian economy. These studies made an attempt to identify and explain the growth phases of Indian economy. One study tries to explain these growth phases in terms of cumulative causation emerging out of positive feedback between producer services sectors and manufacturing sector. Another study examines the role of the crisis, change in economic policy regime and export performance in the growth trajectory of Indian economy. A third one analysed the relationship between public policy and economic growth in the Indian context.

=== Migration ===
Linkages between migration, economic growth, income distribution, and social change.

=== Plantation Crops ===
Research on plantation sector in CDS is being undertaken at the instance of the National Research Programme on Plantation Development sponsored by the Ministry of Commerce. The programme is expected to undertake policy oriented research on all aspects of plantation sector in India and help research capacity building.

=== Politics and Development ===
Studies in this theme have considered the larger questions of shifting relationships between the state, political society and the formal political public, and particular regimes of development, particularly, development policy. The shifts in politics, welfare, and the move from government to governance that characterised the 1990s have been of considerable interest here. Studies that reflect on the politics of the shift from centralised government to decentralised governance, and of the political economy of agrarian change in the wake of the intensifying impacts of globalising neoliberal capitalism, the politics of gender emergent in urban governance, have been carried out. Also, historical work on the politics of welfare in pre- and post-independence Kerala, on marginalisation, exclusion, and abjection in development particularly with reference to dalit people and sexual minorities, and local histories on politics and development in micro-sites of extreme marginalisation and deprivation in Kerala have been published. These studies too constitute a significant part of the interdisciplinary research at CDS in the recent decades. Methodologically, most of these studies employ a diverse set of tools. Most often, descriptive statistics, qualitative methods including interviews of different kinds, focus group discussions, and participant observation, as well as textual and discourse analyses are employed and triangulated. Most of them also deploy a historical perspective that traces different strands of social and political change across time.

== Research Units and Funds ==
- National Research Programme on Plantation Development (NRPPD)
- Planning Commission Endowment Unit on Development Economics
- Reserve Bank of India Endowment Unit on Economic Development
- Government of Kerala Endowment Unit on Local Self Governments
- Union Ministry of Overseas Indian Affairs Research Unit on International Migration
- Joan Robinson Endowment Fund
- P.K. Gopalakrishanan Endowment Fund
- B.G. Kumar Endowment Fund
- A.D. Neelakantan Endowment Fund

== The campus ==
CDS located in a residential area in the northwest part of Thiruvananthapuram, called Prasanthnagar. The 10-acre (40,000 m^{2}) campus, designed and constructed by the architect, Laurie Baker, epitomizes his style and philosophy of adaptive building methods. The CDS Library is now one of the biggest in South India with over 1,70,000 titles in Economics and allied disciplines and subscribing to about 400 professional journals. The library is in the process of being automated.

Directors
- P.G.K. Panikar, 1971–1985
- T.N. Krishnan, 1985–1989
- P.S. George, 1989–1995
- Chandan Mukherjee, 1995–2003
- K.P. Kannan, 2003–2004
- K. Narayanan Nair, 2004–2010
- Pulapre Balakrishnan, December 2010 – December 2013
- Amit Shovon Ray, December 2013 – December 2016
- K. J. Joseph, [acting director] December 2016 – January 2017
- Sunil Mani Feb 2017 – May 2023
- Professor C Veeramani June 2023 – Present
