= Amitava Bose =

Indian economist

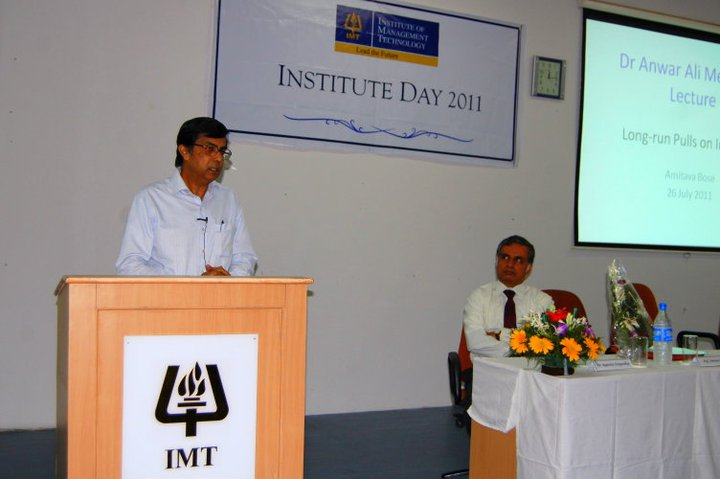
- Amitava Bose
- Born: 28 July 1947; Kolkata, India
- Died: 13 January 2017 (aged 69 years); Kolkata, India

Academic background
- Education: Presidency College, Delhi School of Economics, University of Rochester

Academic work
- School or tradition: Calcutta Boys, Doon School
- Institutions: Indian Institute of Management Calcutta
- Website: Information at IDEAS / RePEc

Amitava Bose was a professor of economics at Indian Institute of Management Calcutta. He was also a former director of IIM-C.

== Education ==
Bose received his B.A. degree in Economics from Presidency College of the University of Calcutta, in 1967, and MA degree in economics with First Rank from the Delhi School of Economics in 1969. Bose completed his Ph.D. programme from University of Rochester in 1974.

== Career ==
In the past, Professor Bose held teaching and/or research positions at Indian Statistical Institute, Cornell University and the University of Calcutta. Bose joined IIM-C in 1974 as an assistant professor, and was a professor at the institute since 1980. At IIM-C, Bose took several advanced courses in Economics, including Advanced Macroeconomics, Development Economics, Economics of the Firm, Cost-Benefit Analysis, Value Theory, Advanced Economic Theory, and General Equilibrium Theory.

Amitava Bose was the director of IIM Calcutta in the period from June 1997 to September 2002.

== Legacy ==
IIM Calcutta has hosted multiple events named after him a two day conference being the most recent

== Select bibliography ==
- Bose, Rakshit & Sinha (1997) "Issues in Economic Theory and Public Policy: Essays in Honour of Professor Tapas Majumdar", Oxford University Press India ISBN 978-0-19-563949-0
- Bose & Ray (2001) "Contemporary Macroeconomics", Oxford University Press ISBN 978-0-19-566214-6
