= Shailendra Raj Mehta =

Indian economist (born 1959)

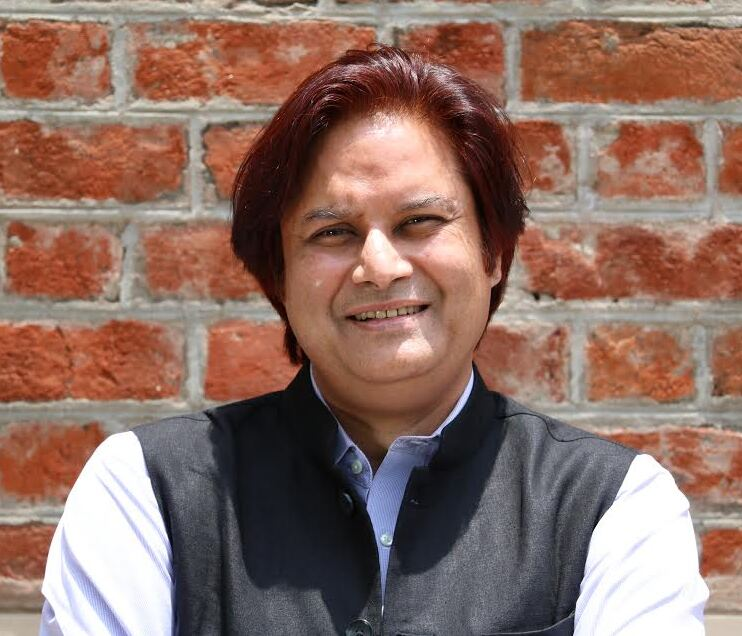
- Mehta in 2017
- Born: 9 July 1959 (age 66); Jodhpur, Rajasthan, India
- Education: Delhi University (BA, MA); University of Oxford (MPhil); Harvard University (PhD)
- Occupations: Academic administrator; Economist; Entrepreneur
- Spouse: Neena Mehta
- Children: 1
- Awards: Rector's Prize, Delhi University INLAKS scholarship Oxford University

Shailendra Raj Mehta (born 9 July 1959) is an Indian academic administrator, economist, and entrepreneur. He served as president and director of the Mudra Institute of Communications, Ahmedabad (MICA) from 2017 to 2024.

He has held other positions in Indian higher education, including chairman of the Board of Management at AURO University, and provost and vice-chancellor of Ahmedabad University. He is a member of the Mission High-Level Committee of the Indian Knowledge System and vice-chairman of the Governing Body of the Indian Institute of Advanced Study, Shimla.

== Early life and education ==
Mehta was born in Jodhpur, Rajasthan. He completed his Bachelor of Arts at St. Stephen's College, Delhi, followed by his Master of Arts from the Delhi School of Economics. He earned an M.Phil. from Balliol College, Oxford, and a Doctor of Philosophy from Harvard University.

== Career ==
Mehta's research has focused on industrial organization, information economics, and experimental economics. He holds several US patents related to data record structuring and industrial simulation environments.

Mehta taught at the Krannert School of Management at Purdue University from 1990 to 2006, where he directed the Entrepreneurship Initiative and the SEAS Simulation Lab. While at Purdue, he co-founded Simulex Inc., a technology company based in the Purdue Research Park that developed simulation technology for crisis-scenario modelling.

He returned to India in 2007 and worked on a collaboration between Duke Corporate Education and the Indian Institute of Management Ahmedabad, which operated in India, West Asia, and the Middle East. He also served as a visiting professor of business policy at the Indian Institute of Management Ahmedabad.

Mehta was appointed provost and vice-chancellor of Ahmedabad University in 2014. The following year, he became chairman of the Board of Management at Auro University, where he also served as acting vice-chancellor.

In 2017, Mehta became president and director of MICA, and the Ministry of Education appointed him vice-chairman of the Governing Body of the Indian Institute of Advanced Study.

After completing his term at MICA, he joined O. P. Jindal Global University in May 2024.
