= Charusita Chakravarty =

Indian academic, researcher (1964–2016)

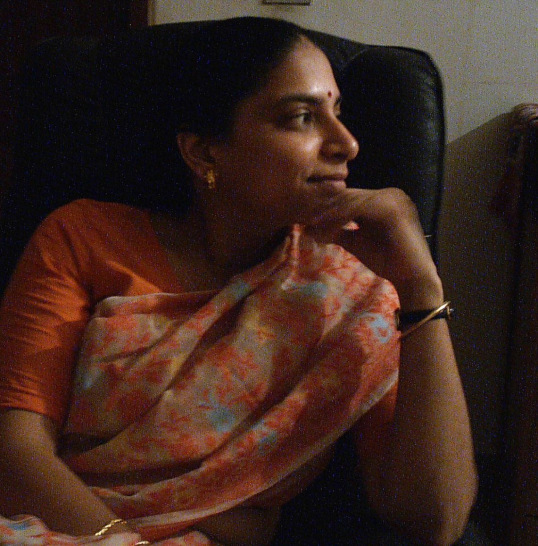
- Born: 5 May 1964; Cambridge, Massachusetts, United States
- Died: 29 March 2016 (aged 51); New Delhi, India
- Education: Delhi University, Cambridge University
- Awards: Shanti Swaroop Bhatnagar Award (2009)
- Scientific career
- Fields: Chemistry, chemical physics, theoretical & computational chemistry
- Workplaces: Indian Institute of Technology, Delhi
- Doctoral advisor: David Clary

Charusita Chakravarty (5 May 1964 – 29 March 2016) was an Indian academic and scientist. She was a professor of chemistry at the Indian Institute of Technology, Delhi since 1999. In 2009, she was conferred Shanti Swarup Bhatnagar Prize for Science and Technology in the field of chemical science. In 1999, she received B.M. Birla Science Award. She was an Associate Member of the Centre for Computational Material Science, Jawaharlal Nehru Centre for Advanced Scientific Research, Bangalore.

On 29 March 2016, Chakravarty passed after a long and arduous battle with breast cancer.

== Early life and education ==
Chakravarty was born in Cambridge, Massachusetts, U.S. on 5 May 1964 as the only daughter of Sukhamoy and Lalita Chakravarty. She was raised in Delhi, India and chose to give up her American citizenship in her twenties. Chakravarty was selected as the National Science Talent Scholar and went on to clear the Joint Entrance Exam (JEE) of the Indian Institutes of Technology (IIT). She did her BSc Chemistry program from St. Stephen's College, University of Delhi. Having graduated from Delhi University with a gold medal, she went on to do the Natural Science Tripos from Cambridge University, UK. Following this, she joined the Doctorate of Philosophy program at Cambridge under the guidance of David Clary. Her thesis was on the spectra and dynamics of Ar–OH, an open shell system that involved a lot of nuances. Charusita then became a Post Doctoral Scholar at the University of California at Santa Barbara, under Professor Horia Metiu. After a brief visit to India, she returned to Cambridge as a Gulbenkian junior research fellow in an independent post-Doctoral position.

== Career ==
In 1994, Chakravarty returned to India for good. The IITs hesitated to give her a teaching position as she did not have a master's degree, even though she had a PhD from Cambridge. She did get an offer from IIT Kanpur, and then went on to accept a position in IIT Delhi's Department of Chemistry, where she continued to teach till her death.

Soon after joining IIT Delhi, she submitted a research proposal to the Department of Science and Technology and having received funding easily, carried on with her research. Her initial work was related to atomic and molecular clusters and over the course of her career, she became famous for her specialised application of path integral Monte Carlo simulation to unravel quantum mechanical effects in the properties of atomic and molecular clusters.

Her fields of interest also included theoretical chemistry and chemical physics, the structure and dynamics of Liquids, water and hydration, nucleation and self-assembly. International and national journals have published her articles and she was widely known for her single-author papers, published extensively over the course of her career. A few of her co-written works include, Multiple Time-scale Behaviour of the Hydrogen Bond Network in Water (2004), Estimating the entropy of liquids from atom-atom radial distribution functions: silica, beryllium fluoride and water (2008), and Excess entropy scaling of transport properties in network-forming ionic melts (2011).

== Research fields ==
Chakravarty worked in the following fields:

- Theoretical chemistry and chemical physics
- Classical and quantum Monte Carlo
- Molecular dynamics
- Structure and Dynamics of Liquids
- Water and hydration
- Nucleation
- Self-assembly

== Selected publications ==
Chakravarty published and co-authored several works in the field of chemistry; a few examples include:

1. Agarwal, M., Singh, M., Jabes, S. B., and Charusita Chakravarty, Excess entropy scaling of transport properties in network-forming ionic melts (SiO2 and BeF2). J. Chem. Phys. 2011, 134, 014502
2. Sharma, R., Agarwal, M. and Charusita, C. Estimating the entropy of liquids from atom-atom radial distribution functions: silica, beryllium fluoride and water. Mol. Phys. 2008, 106, 1925.
3. Agarwal, M. and Chakravarty, C. Waterlike structural and excess entropy anomalies in liquid beryllium fluoride. J. Phys. Chem. B, 2007, 111, 13294.
4. Sharma, R., Nath, Chakraborty, S. N. and Charusita C. Entropy, Diffusivity and Structural Order in Liquids with Water-like Anomalies. J. Chem. Phys. 2006, 125, 204501.
5. Mudi, A.; Chakravarty, C. Multiple Time-scale Behaviour of the Hydrogen Bond Network in Water. J. Phys. Chem. B, 2004, 108, 19607.

== Awards and achievements ==
- Medal for Young Scientists from the Indian National Science Academy (INSA) (1996)
- Shanti Swarup Bhatnagar Prize for Science and Technology (2009)
- B.M. Birla Science Award (1999)
- Indian National Science Academy Medal for Young Scientists (1996)
- Anil Kumar Bose Memorial Award of Indian National Science Academy (1999)
- Fellowship of Indian Academy of Sciences (2006)
- Swarnajayanti Fellowship of the Department of Science and Technology (India) (2004)
- Served as a member of the Abdus Salam International Center for Theoretical Physics, Trieste, Italy (1996–2003)
- Associate Member of the Centre for Computational Material Science, Jawaharlal Nehru Centre for Advanced Scientific Research, Bangalore.

== Other sources ==
- Autobiographical article by Charusita Chakravarty in Lilavati's Daughters
- "Profile of Top 25 scientists in India". India Today. 11 September 2011.
