= Rajan Saxena (management academic) =

Indian academic and management expert

- Born: India

Academic background
- Education: Shri Ram College of Commerce; Delhi School of Economics

Academic work
- Institutions: XLRI; SPJIMR; ICFAI Business School; University of Calgary; University of Stirling; Pace University; IIM Indore; SVKM's NMIMS
- Awards: BERG Education Award; Dr. Suresh Ghai Memorial Award; DNA Hall of Fame Award; ET Now Visionary Leadership Award

Rajan Saxena is an Indian management expert, academic & writer. He is a former Vice-Chancellor of the SVKM's NMIMS, a deemed university in Mumbai, a former director of Indian Institute of Management, Indore, S. P. Jain Institute of Management and Research and ICFAI Business School, Gurgaon. He is also a recipient of the BERG Education Award for 2014.

== Biography ==
Saxena did his college studies at Shri Ram College of Commerce of the Delhi University and secured a doctoral degree (PhD) from the Delhi School of Economics to start his career as a member of faculty at XLRI - Xavier School of Management. Later, he served as the director of S. P. Jain Institute of Management and Research and ICFAI Business School, Gurgaon. When the Indian Institute of Management, Indore was established in 1996, Saxena was appointed as its founder director. In July 2003, he resigned from the post, allegedly due to the appointment of an enquiry committee into the fiscal management of the institution by the Board of Governors. Five years later, he was appointed as the Vice Chancellor of SVKM's NMIMS, Mumbai, having been appointed for a second term in 2014, and retired in 2020.

Saxena, who has been credited with the establishment of NMIMS business schools in Bengaluru and Hyderabad, is a former Visting faculty member of University of Calgary and has taught at University of Stirling as a British Council visitor and at Pace University as a visiting professor. He is a former chairman of the National Academy for Training and Development (NATAD) and has been the government nominee of Mahanagar Telephone Nigam Limited (MTNL). He has served as the senior vice president of the Education Promotion Society of India, Board of Directors of the Lodha Developers Limited, Mumbai and Anuvi Chemicals Limited and the president of the Indian Society for Training & Development. He has also worked as a management consultant to several Indian firms including Reliance Energy, Larsen and Toubro, Parle Exports, Jindal Steel, among others. Besides publishing 60 articles in national and international journals, he has authored Marketing Management, which is a prescribed text on the subject in many Indian universities. He has also delivered keynote addresses and presentations, including at the EFMD‐CEIBS Conference in Shanghai, 2010.

== Awards and honours ==
Saxena is an elected Fellow and life member of the Indian Society for Training & Development (ISTD) and a Fellow of the Institute of Management Consultants of India (IMCI). He is a recipient of many honours such as Dr. Suresh Ghai Memorial Award (2013), DNA Hall of Fame Award and ET Now Visionary Leadership Award (2013). and he received the BERG Education Award in 2014.

== See also ==
- Shri Ram College of Commerce
- XLRI - Xavier School of Management
- S. P. Jain Institute of Management and Research
- Indian Institute of Management, Indore
