= Sukhamoy Chakravarty =

Indian economist (1934–1990)

- Born: 26 July 1934; Mymensingh, British India (now Bangladesh)
- Died: 22 August 1990 (aged 56); New Delhi, India
- Education: Ballygunge Government High School; Presidency College, Kolkata University of Calcutta
- Known for: Chakravarty Committee
- Children: Charusita Chakravarty
- Scientific career
- Fields: Economics
- Workplaces: Delhi School of Economics; Massachusetts Institute of Technology; Johns Hopkins University; Erasmus University Rotterdam; Netherlands Economic Institute
- Doctoral advisor: Jan Tinbergen

Sukhamoy Chakravarty (Bengali:sʊkʰəmoɪ tʃʌkrəvɑːrti; 26 July 1934 – 22 August 1990) was an Indian economist who, along with Prasanta Chandra Mahalanobis, was a key architect of the Five-Year plans of India. He attended Ballygunge Government High School, Calcutta and Presidency College, Kolkata when it was under University of Calcutta as an Economics major, where he was a batchmate of Amartya Sen. He later attended the Delhi School of Economics and obtained a doctorate from Erasmus University Rotterdam under Jan Tinbergen. He assumed a teaching post at Massachusetts Institute of Technology but returned to India to join the Planning Commission. He was a professor of economics at the Delhi School of Economics. Most of all, he was known for the Chakravarty commission of 1982–85 that helped in economic reforms to the monetary system in India.

== Early life and education ==
Born in Mymensingh village in Dhaka in 1934 in a well-to-do family, Sukhamoy completed his schooling where his father was a judge. Subsequently he joined Presidency College in Calcutta for under-graduate studies and Calcutta University for M. A. in Economics. Right from his college days, Chakravarty showed a wide range of interests in literature, philosophy, history and mathematics.

A short stint at the Indian Statistical Institute brought him into contact with P. C. Mahalanobis which helped Chakravarty in starting his professional career. Tinbergen who was on a visit to the Institute was so impressed with Chakravarty that he right away offered him a fellowship for doctoral studies at the Netherlands Institute of Economics. On the completion of his doctoral work in less than one year, he spent two years at the Massachusetts Institute of Technology for doing teaching and research.

== Career ==
In 23 April 1961 P.N. Rosenstein-Rodan had sent a reply in letter to the then PM Jawaharlal Nehru when the latter had demanded to know the best Indian economists from abroad who can be employed in the Planning Commission. The first recommendation made was Sukhamoy who was an assistant professor at MIT at the time. This was followed by A. K. Sen, Jagdish Bhagwati and K. N. Raj.

On his return to India later in 1961 Chakravarty taught at his alma mater, the Presidency College in Calcutta until 1963 when he took up the Sir Shankarlal Professorship in Mathematical Economics at the Delhi School of Economics. This was the beginning of Chakravarty's longest professional association where the performance on his part was significant and the same can be said for his role in the School of Economics. Prior to Chakravarty's arrival, B. N. Ganguli and K. N. Raj were the eminent professors of this school. Jagdish Bhagwati, A. L. Nagar and Amartya Sen too joined its faculty about the same time as Chakravarty. This was a period of high academic activity at the school with seminars jointly held with the Planning Unit of the Indian Statistical Institute (ISI) which had added B. S. Minhas and T. N. Srinivasan to its faculty. Many well regarded economists from British and American universities visiting Delhi under various programmes also actively participated in the same seminars.

The subsequent years were of intense professional activity for Chakravarty. Visiting Professorships at the Massachusetts Institute of Technology and Johns Hopkins University were followed by his appointment as a member of the Planning Commission in 1971 at an unusually young age. In 1976 he was chosen as the first Tinbergen visiting professor at Erasmus University, Rotterdam. In 1984 he was the Jawaharlal Nehru Visiting Professor at Cambridge, England.

== Chakravarty committee ==
In Dec 1982 to review the working of the monetary system, the Chakravarty committee was appointed by the then governor of Reserve Bank of India, Dr. Manmohan Singh and was asked to review the functioning of the monetary system in India. Members were chosen in their individual capacity as eminent men with each member distinguished in his own field of specialization.

The committee was led by these five members and chaired by Chakravarty:

1. Prof. Sukhamoy Chakravarty
2. M. P. Chitale
3. R. K. Hazari
4. F. A. Mehta
5. C. Rangarajan

These were the following below points of reference under which the committee was assigned to work:

- To critically review the structure and operation of the monetary system in the context of the basic objectives of planned development.
- To assess the inter-action between monetary policy and public debt management in so far as they have a bearing on the effectiveness of monetary policy.
- To evaluate the various instruments of monetary and credit policy in terms of their impact on the credit system and on the economy. In this context links among the banking sector, the non-banking financial institutions and the unorganised sector could he assessed.
- To recommend measures for improvement in the formulation and operation of monetary and credit policies and to suggest specific areas where the various policy instruments need strengthening.
- To make such other recommendations as the Committee may deem relevant to the effective operation of monetary and credit policy.

The work got such voluminous that its tentative submission date of 30 April 1984 was extended by one year. More than 200 recommendations / observations were made by the committee at the end of its working in 1985 when the report was submitted. Some of them are listed below:

- The growth in output achieved over the plan periods was accompanied by notable structural shifts in the composition of output. The average share of the public sector in GDP increased from 8.5 percent during the First Five Year Plan period (1951-56) to 23.2 percent in the first four years of the Sixth Plan (1980-81 - 1983-84)
- The importance of strengthening credit delivery systems of the cooperative banks and commercial banks has been recognised in the successive plans particularly since the major segment of the commercial banking system was brought under the public sector in 1969.
- The relative share of state governments in marketable debt out standing which was 15.1 percent in March 1971 declined to 9.1 percent in March 1984.

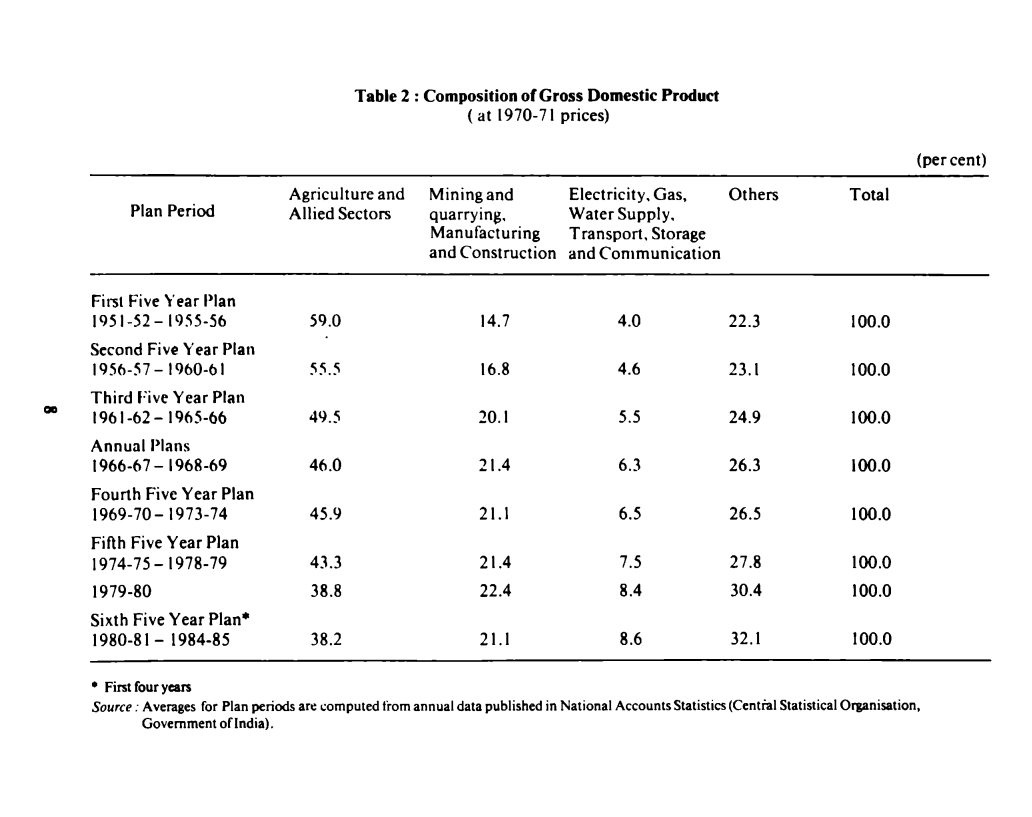
GDP Table

These recommendations helped a lot in upcoming economic reforms in the developing economy of India in the following Five Year Plans.

== Memberships held ==
Having been elected a fellow of the Econometric Society in 1969, he served as a member of its council for several years.

c. 1984, he had been appointed Chairman of the Economic Advisory Council of the Prime Minister and served three successive Prime Ministers.

In 1983-1984, Sukhamoy Chakravarty was one of the seventeen members of the Independent Commission for World-Wide Telecommunications Development chaired by Donald Maitland (International Telecommunication Union/ITU).

He also served as Vice-President of the International Economic Association and played a pivotal role in organizing the World Congress of the Association in Delhi in December 1986 in his additional capacity as President of the Indian Economic Association.

He had also been the Vice President and Founder of Research and Information Systems of Developing Countries (RIS), New Delhi in 1983 for which he held the position till his death. For his efforts in nurturing the administrative officers of RIS in its initial phase, he was honored by having the RIS library named after him.

== Honours and awards ==
Chakravarty was the first recipient of the coveted Mahalanobis Memorial Medal and the V.K.R.V. Rao Prize.

== Legacy ==
Sukhamoy was an avid reader and scholar. Credited to be one of the foremost Indian economists of the 20th Century by his well known colleagues, his initial interest in high theory and mathematical economics gave way to practical policy analysis of issues relating to the under-privileged. He had put forward his scholarship to further the study of applications in development issues. Paul Samuelson and Jan Tinbergen had a deep and profound respect for Chakravarty.

Samuelson had shown his respect by writing in the foreword to Chakravarty's book: ''What makes for a beautiful problem in science? It may be logical beauty: proof that the set of prime numbers cannot be finite... is as aesthetically neat in our times as it was in Euclid’s. But a problem takes on extra lustre if, in addition to its logical elegance, it provides useful knowledge. By the above test, we must judge Professor Chakravarty’s book to be fascinating''

Upon his death, Tinbergen in a tribute remarked that he had learned more from Chakravarty than the latter learnt from him.

A conference was held on 17 March 2017 in G. Parthasarathi Conference Hall in his memory that had been attended by dignitaries such as the former Indian PM Manmohan Singh, Y. K. Alagh, Manmohan Agarwal, V. S. Seshadri, and V. R. Panchamukhi.

== Bibliography ==
=== Books ===
- Chakravarty, S. (1969). Capital and Development Planning. MIT Press.
- Chakravarty, S. (1987). Development Planning: the Indian Experience. MIT Press.

=== Journals ===
- Chakravarty, S. (1962). The Existence of an Optimum Savings Programme. Econometrica, 30(1), 178 – 187.
- Chakravarty, S. (1962). Optimal Savings with Finite Planning Horizon. International Economic Review, 3(3), 338 – 355.
- Chakravarty, S. (1965). An Optimizing Planning Model. Economic and Political Weekly, 17(5−7), 237 – 252.
- Chakravarty, S. (1979). On the Question of Home Market and Prospects for Indian Growth. Economic and Political Weekly, 14(30/32), 1229 – 1242.
- Chakravarty, S. (1988). Development Experience in South Asia. Asian Development Review, 6(1), 22 – 49.

== See also ==
- Mahalanobis model – Marxist model of economic development
- Keynesian economics – Group of macroeconomic theories
- Pontryagin's maximum principle – Principle in optimal control theory for best way to change state in a dynamical system
- Socialist economics – Economic theories, practices and norms of socialism
