= Rajat Kanta Ray =

Indian historian (1946–2025)

- Born: 6 May 1946; Calcutta, Bengal Province, British India
- Died: 6 August 2025 (aged 79)
- Education: Ballygunge Government High School, Kolkata; Presidency College, Calcutta; Trinity College, Cambridge; University of Cambridge
- Scientific career
- Fields: History

Rajat Kanta Ray (Bengali: রজত কান্ত রায়; 6 May 1946 – 6 August 2025) was an Indian historian of South Asian history, specialising in Modern Indian history.

== Background ==
Ray was born on 6 May 1946, the son of Kumud Kanta Ray, ICS who was a Home Secretary of West Bengal in the 1960s. His grandfather, Kamakshya Ray, a contemporary of Rathindranath Tagore, was one of the first four students of Patha Bhavana of Santiniketan.

He completed his schooling at Ballygunge Government High School, Calcutta, and his B.A. (Honours) in History at Presidency College, Calcutta, where he was a student of Ashin Dasgupta. He then completed his Ph.D. under the supervision of Anil Seal at the University of Cambridge. After returning from Cambridge, Ray briefly taught at IIM, Calcutta, before moving to Presidency College, where he taught for more than three decades, and alongside his substantial academic output, is largely remembered as a teacher par excellence.

Ray died on 6 August 2025, at the age of 79.

== Career ==
Ray was an assistant professor of history at the Indian Institute of Management Calcutta. From 1975 to 1982, he was Reader, and then from 1982 to 2006, he was the Professor and Head of the Department of History at Presidency College, Calcutta. He was one of the longest serving professors of the college. From 2006 to 2011, he was the Upacharya of Visva-Bharati. From 2012, he was Professor Emeritus of history at Presidency University. His autobiographical novel Eka Eka Nimalu was highly acclaimed in the literary community and was honoured with Narsingha Das Memorial Award in 1995.

== Bibliography ==
=== Books ===
- Timir Abagunthane (2025) (in Bengali)
- The Felt Community: Commonality and Mentality Before the Emergence of Indian Nationalism, (Delhi: Oxford University Press, 2007)
- Exploring Emotional History: Gender, Mentality, and Literature in the Indian Awakening (Delhi: Oxford University Press, 2001)
- (ed.) Mind, Body and Society: Life and Mentality in Colonial Bengal (Delhi: Oxford University Press, 1996)
- Palasir Sharayantra O Sekaler Samaj (1994) (in Bengali)
- Eka Eka Nimalu (1993) (in Bengali)
- (ed.) Entrepreneurship and Industry in India 1800-1947 (1994)
- (with Basudeb Chattopadhyay and Hari S. Vasudevan) (eds.), Dissent and Consensus: Protest in Pre-Industrial Societies (Calcutta: K.P. Bagchi,1989)
- Social Conflict and Political Unrest in Bengal 1875-1927 (Delhi: Oxford University Press, 1985)
- The Evolution of the Professional Structure in Modern India: Older and New Professions in a Changing Society (1983)
- Urban Roots of Indian Nationalism: Pressure Groups and Conflict of Interests in Calcutta City Politics, 1875-1939 (Delhi: Oxford University Press, 1979)
- Industrialization in India: Growth and Conflict in the Private Corporate Sector, 1914-47 (1979)

=== Articles ===
- "Prasanga Rabindranath: Jivandevatar Jivani" (In Bengali) [Professor Susovan Chandra Sarkar Memorial Lecture] (2012)
- "Foreword" to D.A. Low (ed.) Congress and the Raj: Facets of the Indian Struggle 1917 - 47, (2006)
- "Indian Society and the Establishment of British Supremacy" in P.J. Marshall and Alaine Low, (eds.) The Oxford History of the British Empire, Vol. II, The Eighteenth Century, (Delhi: Oxford University Press, 1998)
- Ray, Rajat Kanta (July 1995). "Asian Capital in the Age of European Domination: The Rise of the Bazaar, 1800-1914". Modern Asian Studies. 29 (3). Cambridge University Press: 449–554. doi:10.1017/S0026749X00013986. JSTOR 312868. S2CID 145744242.
- "Merchants and Politics: From the Great Mughals to the East India Company", with Lakshmi Subramanian, in Dwijendra Tripathi (ed.), Business and Politics in India: A historical perspective, (New Delhi, 1991)
- "The Raj, the Congress and the Bengal Gentry 1880-1905" in Rajat Kanta Ray, Basudeb Chattopadhyay and Hari S. Vasudevan (eds.), Dissent and Consensus: Protest in Pre-Industrial Societies, (Calcutta: K.P.Bagchi, 1989)
- "The Retreat of the Jotedars?" Indian Economic and Social History Review, 25. 2, 1988
- Sisson, Richard; Wolpert, Stanley (1 January 1988). "Moderates, Extremists and Revolutionaries: Bengal, 1900-1908". Congress and Indian Nationalism: The Pre-Independence Phase. University of California Press. pp. 62–90. ISBN 978-0-520-06041-8.
- “The Kahar Chronicle.” Modern Asian Studies 21, no. 4 (1987): 711–49. http://www.jstor.org/stable/312760.
- "The Bazar: Indigenous Sector of the Indian Economy" in Dwijendra Tripathi (ed.), Business Communities of India, (New Delhi, 1984)
- "Pedhis and Mills: The Historical Integration of Formal and Informal Sectors in the Economy of Ahmedabad", Indian Economic and Social History Review, 19:3 & 4, 1982
- (with Ratnalekha Ray), "Zamindars and Jotedars: A Study in Rural Politics in Bengal", Modern Asian Studies, Vol. 9, 1, 1975, pp. 81–102
- “CALCUTTA MUNICIPAL POLITICS IN 1890.” Proceedings of the Indian History Congress, Vol. 35, 1974, pp. 273–80. JSTOR, https://www.jstor.org/stable/44138792.
- "The Crisis in Bengal Agriculture 1870-1927: The Dynamics of Immobility", Indian Economic and Social History Review, 10, 3, 1973, pp. 244–279
- (with Ratnalekha Ray), "The Dynamics of Continuum in Rural Bengal under the British Imperium", Indian Economic and Social History Review, 10, 2, 1973, pp. 103–128
