= Sat Parashar =

Sat Paul Parashar
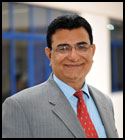
- Born: Gujarat, India
- Education: Faculty of Management Studies; Delhi School of Economics; University of Delhi
- Employer(s): Bahrain Institute of Banking and Finance
- Known for: Financial management business education administration

Sat Paul Parashar is an Indian financial management expert of business education. He served as director at the Indian Institutes of Management, Indore for 4 years from mid 2004 to the end of 2007.

== Education ==
Parashar holds an M.Com from the Delhi School of Economics (1971) and obtained his PhD from the Faculty of Management Studies, University of Delhi (1981). His doctoral thesis was titled "Liquidity Management in Selected Indian Companies".

== Career ==
Parashar was a faculty member of the banking center at the Bahrain Institute of Banking and Finance (BIBF). He was the head of the Research and Studies Department at the Emirates Institute for Banking and Financial Studies in Sharjah from 1999 to 2004, and director at the Indian Institutes of Management, Indore from 2004 to 2008.

He held the IFCI Golden Jubilee Chair Professor of Finance at the Management Development Institute. Prior to this, he was associate professor of Finance at the Xavier Labor Relations Institute, Jamshedpur and faculty at the University of Delhi.

== Publications ==
He is a member of the editorial boards of the Indian Journal of Finance and Research, the Journal of the Indian Financial Management Association, and the International Journal of Business Competition and Growth.

=== Books ===
- Liquidity Management, Principles & Practices of Managing Cash Flow, Vision Books, New Delhi, 1986.
- WTO Agreements on Financial Services- Implications for UAE Banks, with Hassan Aboutahir
- Foreign direct investment strategic options for the UAE, with Qasrawi Sophia
