= Ashwani Mahajan =

Indian economist

Dr. Ashwani Mahajan
- Born: India
- Citizenship: Indian
- Occupations: Economist, Professor
- Office: National Co-Convenor; Swadeshi Jagaran Manch

Academic background
- Education: Ramjas College (B.A.); Delhi School of Economics (M.A.); University of Lucknow (PhD)

Ashwani Mahajan is an Indian economist and the current National Co-Convener of Swadeshi Jagaran Manch (SJM), an Indian political and cultural organisation. SJM is affiliated with the Rashtriya Swayamsevak Sangh.

== Education ==
He completed his B.A. degree in economics from Ramjas College and his M.A. in economics from Delhi School of Economics of Delhi University. He has also completed his PhD in economics from the University of Lucknow.

== Career ==
Mahajan worked as an author and columnist. He is professor of economics at PGDAV College, University of Delhi. He is the Chief Editor of Journal of Contemporary Indian Polity and Economy since 2011. Mahajan is also a visiting professor and research guide at Pacific University, Udaipur and Mewar University. He works as a researcher and activist on World Trade Organization (WTO) and other international trade agreements, he has attended four ministerial conferences of WTO held at Geneva, Bali, Nairobi and Buenos Aires, as representative of Swadeshi Jagran Foundation, which is an accredited NGO with WTO.

== Author ==
Mahajan is a writer on the economy of India. In 2014, he co-authored Datt & Sundaram's Indian Economy. Mahajan has published a number of articles in various national dailies and periodicals including Deccan Herald, The Statesman, Pioneer, The Excelsior, The Economic Times, Business Today, Organiser, Dainik Jagran (Hindi), Rajasthan Patrika (Hindi), Amar Ujala (Hindi) and Hindustan (Hindi). He has also published a number of research articles journals including Economic and Political Weekly, Mainstream, Indian Economic and Almanac.

=== Publications ===
- Datt & Sundharam Indian Economy with Gaurav Datt, (2014, revised 2016, S. Chand Group) ISBN 9789352531295
- Bhartiya Arthvyavastha with Gaurav Datt, (2015, S. Chand Publishing, in Hindi) ISBN 9789385676444

== Politics ==
=== Policy intervention ===
As National Co-Convener of Swadeshi Jagran Manch he has been instrumental changing in economic policies. His policy interventions include withdrawal of controversial ordinance on land acquisition, getting field trials of GM crops policy revisited, FDI policy of the government especially retail trade and e-commerce.

=== Views on development ===
A critique of globalisation, he believes that GDP growth-centric philosophy of development does not suit India. This model talks about the last men in the queue and favours integrating growth with employment generation.

He has been critical of foreign direct investment and ready to use therapeutic foods. Mahajan is a staunch opponent of genetically modified (GM) seeds, has been running a campaign against permission to new GM seeds in India.
