= Mihir Shah =

Indian economist

Mihir Shah is an Indian economist and former member of the erstwhile Planning Commission of India.

== Education ==
Mihir Shah graduated with a B.A. degree in economics in 1976 from St. Stephen's College, Delhi. In 1978, he received an M.A. degree in economics from Delhi School of Economics. He also received a PhD degree in economics from Centre for Development Studies (affiliated to Jawaharlal Nehru University), Trivandrum in 1984.

== Career ==
From 2009 to 2014, Shah was member, Planning Commission, Government of India, holding the portfolios of Water Resources, Rural Development and Decentralised Governance. He is the youngest-ever member of the Planning Commission. Shah was chiefly responsible for drafting the paradigm shift in the management of water resources enunciated in the 12th Five Year Plan. As chairman of the Government of India's Committee for Revision of MGNREGA Guidelines, he initiated a makeover of MGNREGA, the largest employment programme in human history, with a renewed emphasis on rural livelihoods based on construction of productive assets.

An expert on water and rural development, he holds memberships in several important committees such as the International Steering Committee of the CGIAR Research Program on Water, Land and Ecosystems (WLE) and serves as the chair of the Revitalising Rainfed Areas Network in India. He is also the first president of the Bharat Rural Livelihoods Foundation, which supports innovative civil society action in close partnership with state governments. He also chaired the Government of India's Task Force on the National Social Assistance Programme which presented a landmark report in 2013. Mihir Shah chaired the advisory council of the first India Rural Development Report brought out by the Ministry of Rural Development.

In 1990, he co-founded Samaj Pragati Sahayog, which is today one of the largest grass-roots initiatives for water and livelihood security, working with its partners on a million acres of land across 72 of India's most backward districts. Mihir Shah has spent nearly three decades living and working in central tribal India, forging a new paradigm of inclusive and sustainable development.

Mihir Shah, along with his colleagues penned their experiences in the book, India's Drylands: Tribal Societies and Development through Environmental Regeneration, which was published by Oxford University Press in 1998. The book brings out the macro-economic significance of watershed programmes for food security and employment guarantee in India. He has also played a significant role shaping policies and in the development of tribal areas in Madhya Pradesh. He coauthored one of three chapters in Human Development Report of the state in 1998.

Shah is a visiting faculty member at Ashoka University, where he teaches a course on the Political Economy of India's Development 1947–2014 for the Young India Fellowship students. With effect from 1 August 2016, Shah has been appointed the first distinguished visiting professor at the Shiv Nadar University. Under Shah's leadership, the Shiv Nadar University launched an M.Sc. Program on Water Science and Policy in August 2017, which aims to be a first-of-its-kind program globally. Few programs across the world are able to incorporate the essential multi-disciplinary character of water. Fewer still deal with the urgent policy requirements of the sector. This program, with a faculty drawn from leading water experts from across the world, seeks to address both lacunae. The main aim of the program is to create a critical mass of water professionals with a historically and socially contextualised, multi-disciplinary perspective and understanding of water. These water professionals would guide development of sustainable and just 21st century policies, programmes and solutions to the growing water crisis.

In September 2015, Shah led a seven-member committee to restructure the Central Water Commission (CWC) and the Central Ground Water Board (CGWB), and achieve optimal development of water resources in the country The panel recommended disbanding the CWC and CGWB, two of the biggest water organisations, and creating a multi-disciplinary National Water Commission (NWC) in their place, and for greater involvement of social scientists, professionals from management and other specialised disciplines and reduce reliance on engineers who man the CWC. Full report of the committee is available in the Ministry of Water resources website. The highly rated social science journal, Economic and Political Weekly, devoted a whole issue (24 December 2016) to a symposium on the Mihir Shah Committee Report with 12 renowned water scholars and activists commenting on it and Mihir Shah giving a response.

However, the CWC is unhappy with these recommendations and sent a strong note condemning them to the Water Resources Minister, Uma Bharati. The CWC claimed that these recommendations were anti-dam and anti-development, both of which Shah refuted claiming that on the contrary they intent to make them much stronger institutions in a new avatar which would devolve more power to states and reduce delays in techno-economic appraisals of projects. Mihir Shah notes, "it is not enough to just build dams and then forget about the trillions of litres of water stored in them. We need to ensure that this water reaches the people". The prime minister's office is evidently open to the idea of forming a National Water Commission, combining CWC and CGWB

In July 2017, Shah became one of the Founding Signatories of the Geneva Actions on Water Security, which aim to secure environmentally sustainable water services for those people who are least able to afford them and ensure, as a first priority, that investments from the Global Human Water Security Fund meet the basic water needs of disadvantaged and vulnerable people for drinking, hygiene, and cooking.

In December 2017, Shah was appointed chair of the Task Group to draft the Karnataka State Water Policy. The group submitted its report in December 2018.
