= Ballygunge Government High School =

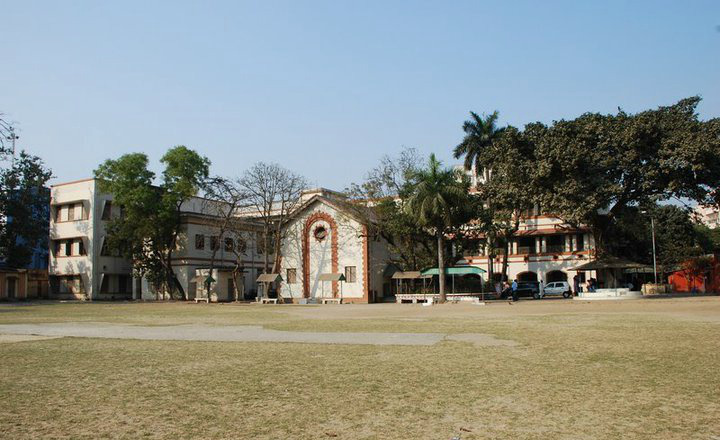

Location
- 38/2, Naresh Mitra Sarani; Kolkata – 700020; India; 22.5301°N 88.3539°E

Information
- School type: Government school
- Established: 1927; 99 years ago
- Authority: Government of West Bengal
- Headmaster: Ranjit Garang(Teacher-in-charge)
- Enrollment: 1200
- Language: Bengali, English
- Nickname: Ballygungian
- Yearbook: Baagbitan
- Affiliation: WBBSE and WBCHSE

Ballygunge Government High School (BGHS) is a school in West Bengal, India. This is a boys' only school for secondary and higher secondary level students. Its medium of instruction is Bengali and English.

== Notable alumni ==
- Ritwik Ghatak – Filmmaker and script-writer
- Sukhamoy Chakraborty – Economist
- Partha Sarathi Gupta – Historian
- Rahul Dev Burman – music director & actor
- Satyajit Ray -director & screenwriter
- Sombhu Mitra- film actor & director
- Rajat Kanta Ray – Historian

== See also ==
- List of schools in Kolkata
