= A. G. Krishnamurthy =

Indian advertising professional

- Born: 28 April 1942; Vinukonda, Andhra Pradesh, India
- Died: 5 February 2016 (aged 73)
- Other name: AGK
- Occupations: Advertising and Public Relations
- Known for: Agency founder Mudra Communications Limited, Institute founderMudra Institute of Communications Ahmedabad

Atchyutuni Gopala Krishnamurthy (28 April 1942 – 5 February 2016) was an Indian advertising professional. He was chairman and managing director of Mudra Communications Limited, which he founded, from 1980 to 2003.

== Early life and career ==
A. G. Krishnamurthy born in Telugu Bhramin Community, graduated from Andhra University with a B.A. in history. He began his career at Calico Mills in 1968, moving to Shilpi Advertising, Calico's ad agency, as an account executive in 1972. He joined Reliance Industries as Advertising Manager in 1976 and left there to set up Mudra Communications on 25 March 1980. He retired from Mudra in March 2003, handing it over to Madhukar Kamath. In the same year, he set up a consultancy named AGK Brand Consulting.

== Legacy ==
Krishnamurthy established Mudra Institute of Communications Ahmedabad in March 1991 to provide workers for the expanding advertising industry in India, which until then was lacking in manpower to match its needs. He also wrote several books on his experiences in advertising and his clients, among which were Learnings of an Advertising Practitioner, Ten Much, which was a collection of inspirational stories of people overcoming odds and realising dreams, Desi Dream Merchants and The Invisible CEO. Krishnamurthy in 2000, also set-up MAGINDIA.COM (Mudra Advertising Gallerie India) – India's largest online Advertising Archives to offer knowledge support services to the Indian advertising industry. MAGINDIA.COM was in operation during 2000–2010.

== Death ==
Krishnamurthy died on 5 February 2016 in Hyderabad at the age of 73 after a brief illness.

== Awards ==
- 1995: A. & M. Advertising Person of the Year
- 1997: Inducted into 'Hall of Fame' of The Advertising Club, Calcutta
- 1999: AAAI – Premnarayen Award
