= J. P. S. Uberoi =

Indian sociologist and anthropologist (1934–2024)

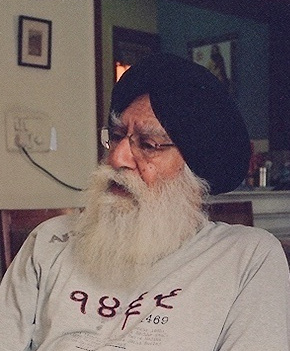
- Uberoi in 2012
- Born: Jitendra Pal Singh Uberoi; September 1934; Lahore, Punjab Province, British India
- Died: January 3, 2024 (aged 89); Delhi, India
- Education: University College London; University of Manchester; Australian National University
- Occupation: Professor of Sociology at the Delhi School of Economics
- Known for: sociology of religion; sociology of modernity; sociology of Afghanistan and West Asia; Sikh studies; philosophical anthropology; Goethe studies; structuralism
- Awards: Lifetime Achievement Award of the Indian Sociological Society (2011)

Jitendra Pal Singh Uberoi (September 1934 – 3 January 2024) was an Indian sociologist and philosophical anthropologist. He was a Professor of Sociology from the Delhi School of Economics. Uberoi is credited with contributions toward establishing sociology as a discipline of study in post-colonial India and also non-western reading of the west, including the study of the history and anthropology of science and European modernity.

== Life and career ==
Uberoi was born in Lahore in 1934. His father was Mohan Singh Diwana, a noted scholar of Punjabi literature and culture. In 1966, Uberoi married the sociologist Patricia Uberoi (née Robyn Hughes). They had three children, Safina, Prem, and Zoe. In the wake of the 1984 anti-Sikh riots in Delhi, Uberoi transformed from being an atheist to a turban-wearing, practicing Sikh. He and Patricia remained married until his death on 3 January 2024.

=== Education ===
Uberoi graduated from University College London with a degree in electrical engineering and telecommunications in 1955. A chance meeting with the sociologist Basil Bernstein changed the course of his career from engineering to anthropology.

Uberoi studied anthropology for his masters (1955–1958) at the University of Manchester under the anthropologists Max Gluckman, Victor Turner, and Pamela Watson. His graduate work at Manchester culminated in the publication of his first book, Politics of the Kula Ring: An Analysis of the Findings of Bronislaw Malinowski (Manchester University Press), in 1962.

He completed his Ph.D. in 1964 in the Department of Anthropology at the Australian National University. For his doctoral research, he conducted ethnographic research among the Tajiks of Afghanistan, and subsequently wrote and defended a Ph.D. thesis entitled Social Organisation of the Tajiks of Andarab Valley, Afghanistan.

=== Teaching career ===
Uberoi began his teaching career at Australia's Monash University, where he taught social anthropology and sociology from 1963 to 1966.

In 1968, Uberoi returned to India on the invitation of M.N. Srinivas and joined the department of sociology at the Delhi School of Economics, Delhi University. After serving a few months as Reader, he was appointed as Professor of Sociology at this department in 1969. He was 34 years old at the time. He went on to teach and research in this capacity till his retirement in 1999. Some of his colleagues there were André Beteille, Veena Das, Amitav Ghosh, and A.M. Shah. Uberoi headed the department of sociology at the Delhi School of Economics from 1977 to 1979. He was also the proctor of Delhi University from 1971 to 1973.

=== Research ===
Uberoi was instrumental in establishing sociology as a discipline of study in post-colonial India. At a time when the prevalent thinking focused on understanding India as a society, he focused his studies outside of India, primarily focusing on studying European modernity, until the 1980s. As a social anthropologist, he did much of his fieldwork in Afghanistan, studying the Tajiks of the region. As a head of the department of sociology at the Delhi School of Economics, he is credited for distinguishing the department by its research rigor and quality of teaching. He established a European Studies Program at the Delhi School of Economics' Department of Sociology, aiming to study western theories and practices from an Indian perspective.

=== Awards and recognition ===
- In 1958, Uberoi was awarded the Hocart Prize by the Royal Anthropological Institute for an essay which was published as Chapter 2 in his book Politics of the Kula Ring.
- In 2011, he was awarded the Lifetime Achievement Award by the Indian Sociological Society.
- In July 2019, the India International Centre in Delhi held an evening event in his honour.

== Books ==
- Politics of the Kula Ring: An Analysis of the Findings of Bronislaw Malinowski (1962, Manchester University Press)
- Science and Culture (1978, Oxford University Press)
- The other mind of Europe: Goethe as a Scientist (1984, Oxford University Press)
- Religion, civil society, and the state: a study of Sikhism (1996, Oxford University Press)
- The European Modernity: Science, Truth, and Method (2002, Oxford University Press)
- Mind and Society: From Indian Studies to General Sociology (2019, Oxford University Press)

== See also ==
- Science and technology studies in India
