= Mohan Singh Diwana =

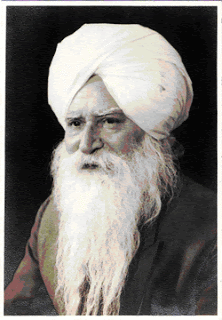
- Born: 1899; Rawalpindi, British Punjab
- Died: 1984 (85 years)
- Education: Government College, Lahore; Calcutta University
- Occupations: Writer, poet
- Writing career
- Subject: Punjabi Literature
- Notable work: History of Panjabi Literature (1100–1932)

Mohan Singh Uberoi Diwana (17 March 1899 – 25 May 1984), more commonly known as Mohan Singh Diwana, was a Punjabi literary scholar and a poet.

== Biography ==
=== Personal life ===
Diwana was born in Devi village of Rawalpindi district in Punjab Province, British India in 1899. His wife was Devinder Kaur, from whom he separated in 1953. From 1975 onwards, he lived mostly in Chandigarh. His son J. P. S. Uberoi (1934–2024) grew up to become a renowned sociologist.

The Sahitya Academy published a detailed work on the life and work of Diwana by Harbhajan Singh Bhatia in the Punjabi language.

=== Education ===
Diwana did his B.A. (Hons) in English from the Government College, Lahore, M.A. in English Literature from Calcutta University (1924), and PhD in Urdu literature from Calcutta University (1931). In 1933, he was awarded a D.Litt. by Punjab University for writing the first-ever systematic history of Punjabi literature.

=== Teaching ===
Diwana was appointed a lecturer of Punjabi at Panjab University, Lahore, in 1928, a post he held till 1944. From then till his retirement in 1959, he served as Reader and head of the Punjabi department at the same university.

== Contributions ==
- Diwana is known for the first authentic research in the history of Panjabi literature, which resulted in the book History of Panjabi Literature (1100 - 1932) (1933). In this book, he divides Punjabi literature chronologically into 'the Pre-Nanak Age', 'the Age of Nanak', 'the Later Moghul Period', 'the Age of Ranjit Singh', and 'the British Period'.
- Some of Diwana's well-known works of poetry include Nīl Dhārā (The Blue Ocean, 1935), Jagat Tamāsha (The World Fair, 1942), Mastī (Ecstasy, 1946–49), and Dhup Chāṅ (Sunshine and Shade, 1932).
- Diwana discovered the 'Adi Sakhian' tradition of Janamsakhi when he came across a manuscript dated to 1701 A.D., while teaching at the Panjab University, Lahore.
- He is regarded as the 'undisputed saviour' of Shah Hussain's 'kafis' in the written form, by having discovered several old manuscripts.
