= Swadeshi Jagran Manch =

Indian organization

Swadeshi Jagaran Manch
- Formation: 1991 (35 years ago)
- Type: Political and cultural
- Region served: India
- Website: Official website

The Swadeshi Jagaran Manch (SJM; Hindi: स्वदेशी जागरण मंच) is a political and cultural pan-India movement that works on public policy and economic issues. Since at least 2015 the SJM has been critical of foreign direct investment. Founded on 22 November 1991 in Nagpur, Maharashtra, Swadeshi Jagaran Manch works on issues related to economic policy and public policy discussions in India. The organisation promotes the concept of swadeshi and engages with issues related to economic self-reliance, domestic production and sustainable development. It conducts conferences, seminars, awareness programmes and publications on subjects connected with economic and social development.

== History ==
Swadeshi Jagaran Manch was founded on 22 November 1991 in Nagpur, Maharashtra, under the guidance of Dattopant Thengadi, founder of the Bharatiya Mazdoor Sangh and Bharatiya Kisan Sangh. The organisation was established to promote the concept of swadeshi and encourage discussions on economic self-reliance, indigenous development and sustainable growth in India.

Dr. M. G. Bokare, an economist and former Vice-Chancellor of Nagpur University, served as the organisation's first convener. During its formative years, the organisation organised seminars, conferences, study circles and awareness programmes on issues relating to economic development, industry, agriculture and self-reliance.

Throughout the 1990s and 2000s, Swadeshi Jagaran Manch expanded its organisational network across India through state, regional and district-level units. The organisation conducted educational programmes, public discussions and outreach activities aimed at promoting awareness of swadeshi-based approaches to development and encouraging participation in issues relating to national economic growth. In subsequent years, it broadened its engagement with policymakers, academics, entrepreneurs and civil society organisations through conferences, workshops and public programmes.

The organisation continued to organise seminars, policy discussions, training programmes and awareness campaigns relating to entrepreneurship, manufacturing, technology, agriculture and self-reliance. It also supported initiatives aimed at promoting local enterprise and economic development in different parts of the country.
