= Jyotirmoyee Devi =

Indian writer

Jyotirmoyee Devi জ্যোতির্ময়ী দেবী
- Born: 23 January 1894; Jaipur
- Died: 17 November 1988 (aged 94); Kolkata, West Bengal, India
- Occupation: Writer

Jyotirmoyee Devi (Bengali: জ্যোতির্ময়ী দেবী) (1894–1988) was an Indian writer in the early twentieth century. She wrote predominantly about women in the Rajasthan of her childhood and in what is now West Bengal at the time of Partition.

== Biography ==
Devi was born in the Princely State of Jaipur in 1894, where her family had lived since 1857.

When she was 25 years old, her husband died of influenza. With six small children, Devi returned to her parents' house, leaving one child with her husband’s family. She lived under the rules of orthodox Hindu widowhood. She spent much of her time secluded and read from her grandfather's library.

She also wrote non-fiction, writing especially about the rights of women and Dalits. Her collection of short stories, Sona Rupa Noy (Not Gold and Silver) won the Rabindra Puraskar in 1973. From 1959 to 1988 she resided in the Shyambazar area.

== Bibliography ==
- Jyotirmoyee Devi (1968). Epar Ganga, Opar Ganga [The River Churning: A Partition Novel]. Translated by Enakshi Chatterjee. New Delhi: Kali for Women.
- Jyotirmoyee Devi (1999). The Impermanence of Lies. Calcutta: Stree. (With Introduction by Mahasweta Devi)
- Jyotirmoyee Devi (2023). Behind Latticed Marble Inner Worlds Of Women. Translated by Apala G. Egan. Thornbird. ISBN 9789391125332.
