= MICA (institute) =

Higher education institution for Strategic Marketing and Communication skills in India

- Motto: The School of Ideas
- Founder: A. G. Krishnamurthy
- Established: 1991
- Location: Ahmedabad, Gujarat, India
- Coordinates: 23.018006°N 72.532114°E
- Interactive map of MICA
- Website: www.mica.ac.in

MICA, formerly MICA Foundation for communications Research and Education, is a private business school located in Ahmedabad, India. MICA has a wide range of academic offerings including residential programmes for Post Graduate Management Studies and a Fellow Programme in Management (Communication) (residential, but off campus).

== History ==
MICA was established in 1991 by A. G. Krishnamurthy of Mudra Communications, as an autonomous post graduate academic institute. The main academic block was inaugurated in 1993 and MICA relocated to its current campus at Shela. It was also the year in which its first Director Binod C. Agrawal began his tenure. The first batch of PGPD program in Communications was inaugurated in 1994. Atul Tandon served as director from 2001 to 2009. Jaya Deshmukh is the current Director and CEO.

== Academics ==
MICA offers various post-graduate certificate programmes in the area of strategic communication and marketing either as fully residential programmes or as online programmes. It also offers a fellow (doctoral level) programme. MICA has partnered with Emory University for data analytics, luxury marketing and consumer insight and with Michigan State University (MSU) and Northwestern University for marketing management and integrated marketing communications. MICA has three residential programmes - Post Graduate Diploma in Management (Communications) and Crafting Creative Communication. PGDM-C is the flagship programme offered by MICA.MICA also offers a doctoral program called Fellow Program in Management (FPM) ( communication).

From the year 2019, MICA has also launched a new postgraduate program called the Post Graduate Diploma in Management.

== Notable faculty ==
- Shailendra Raj Mehta, President and Director, MICA and Distinguished Professor for Innovation and Entrepreneurship at MICA.
- Prof Varsha Jain - Prof Jain is a AGK Mani Aiyer chair professor at MICA Ahmedabad. She's known for her research and teaching excellence. Prof Jain served as a FPM chair at the institute, and achieving AIU/ NIRF status for the institution.
- Jaya Deshmukh is the new MICA director. Appointed for a period of five years and armed with over 25 years of global experience in Business Strategy and Digital Transformation, she will replace Dr Shailendra Raj Mehta whose term ended on May 31 2024. An alumna from the first batch of MICA, Deshmukh will be the first woman to occupy the chair.
