= K. N. Raj =

Indian economist

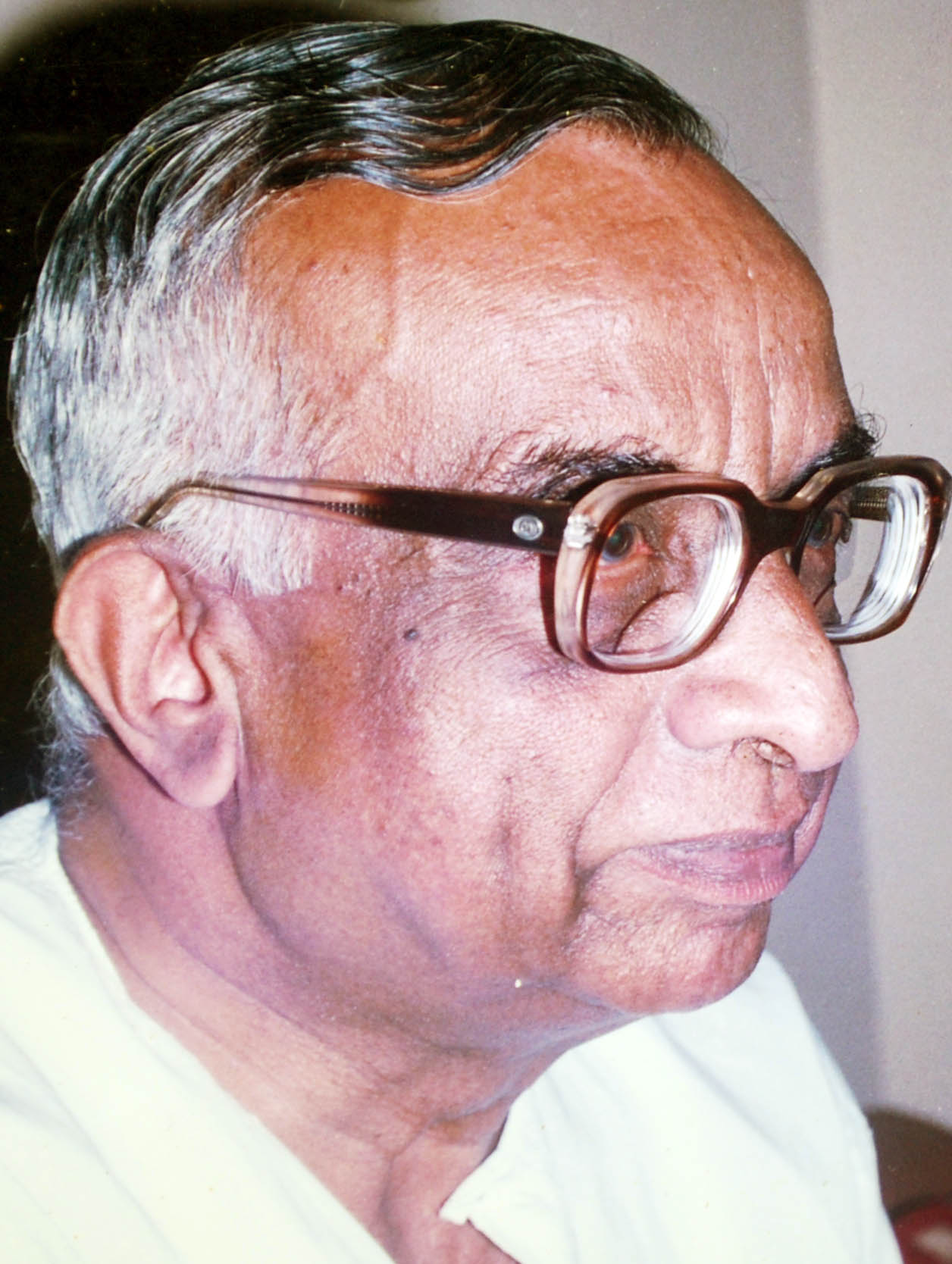
- Born: 13 May 1924; Thrissur District
- Died: February 10, 2010 (aged 85); Thiruvananthapuram
- Education: Madras Christian College, London School of Economics
- Occupation: Economist
- Known for: Setting up the Centre for Development Studies; Drafting sections of India's first Five Year Plan;

Kakkadan Nandanath Rajan (13 May 1924 – 10 February 2010) was an Indian economist. He is popularly known as K. N. Raj. He played an important role in India's planned development, drafting sections of India's first Five Year Plan, specifically the introductory chapter when he was only 26 years old. He was a veteran economist in the Planning Commission. He worked out a plan to raise India's rate of savings in the post-Second World War period when the country was in need of foreign aid. He computed India's Balance of Payments for the first time for the Reserve Bank of India. Raj was an advisor to several prime ministers from Jawaharlal Nehru to P.V. Narasimha Rao. Dr. Raj was a Keynesian economist. He studied the application of Keynesian monetary theory in an Indian context.

== Early life ==
Raj was born in Thrissur District. He did a B.A. from the prestigious Madras Christian College. He was a disciple of a well-distinguished economist Malcolm Adiseshiah at Madras Christian college. His teacher pressed for him to go for higher studies in London School of Economics. His thesis was on the monetary policy of India's central bank. Raj was a companion of distinguished economists like Manmohan Singh, Amartya Sen and Jagdish Bhagwati. Although he was a staunch leftist, he was critical of Lenin's ideas of the State. He opposed the economic liberalisation in India.

== Career ==
Raj joined Delhi University, where he was Professor of Economics and also Vice-Chancellor (from October 1969 to December 1970), spending a total of 18 years there. During that time, he was instrumental in setting up the Delhi School of Economics (DSE).

After returning to Kerala from Delhi in 1971, Raj set up the Centre for Development Studies at Thiruvananthapuram, an institution that soon acquired an international reputation for applied economics and social science research. The work that Raj and his colleagues did for the United Nations in the early days of the CDS, and published in 1976, helped shape the contours of what later came to be called the "Kerala model of development" - the co-existence of low per capita income and very high physical quality of life indicators like life expectancy and literacy rate. It was really a paradox between economic and social development.

Raj once wrote philosophically: "I think that most of the things that welfare economists talk about are those that are obvious to all of us, especially the common people. In fact, even a pure philosopher and religious thinker like Sree Narayana Guru, who achieved a social transformation in Kerala, spoke about the very same things that welfare economists speak about today: education, health care facilities, even small-scale industries... Many people like me practised welfare economics without knowing that it was welfare economics because we were anxious that economics should help the poor. But people who take economic theory literally would say that this is not our problem." Raj stood for the welfare of Aam Aadmi throughout his life.

== Awards ==
He was awarded the Padma Vibhushan in 2000.

== Death ==
K. N. Raj died on 10 February 2010 at a private hospital in Thiruvananthapuram.
