= Economic history of India =

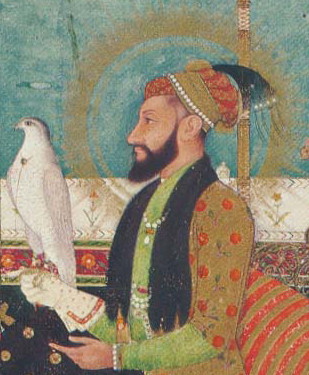
Aurangzeb expanded the Mughal Empire. Under his rule, Indian economy became the largest GDP in the early 18th century.

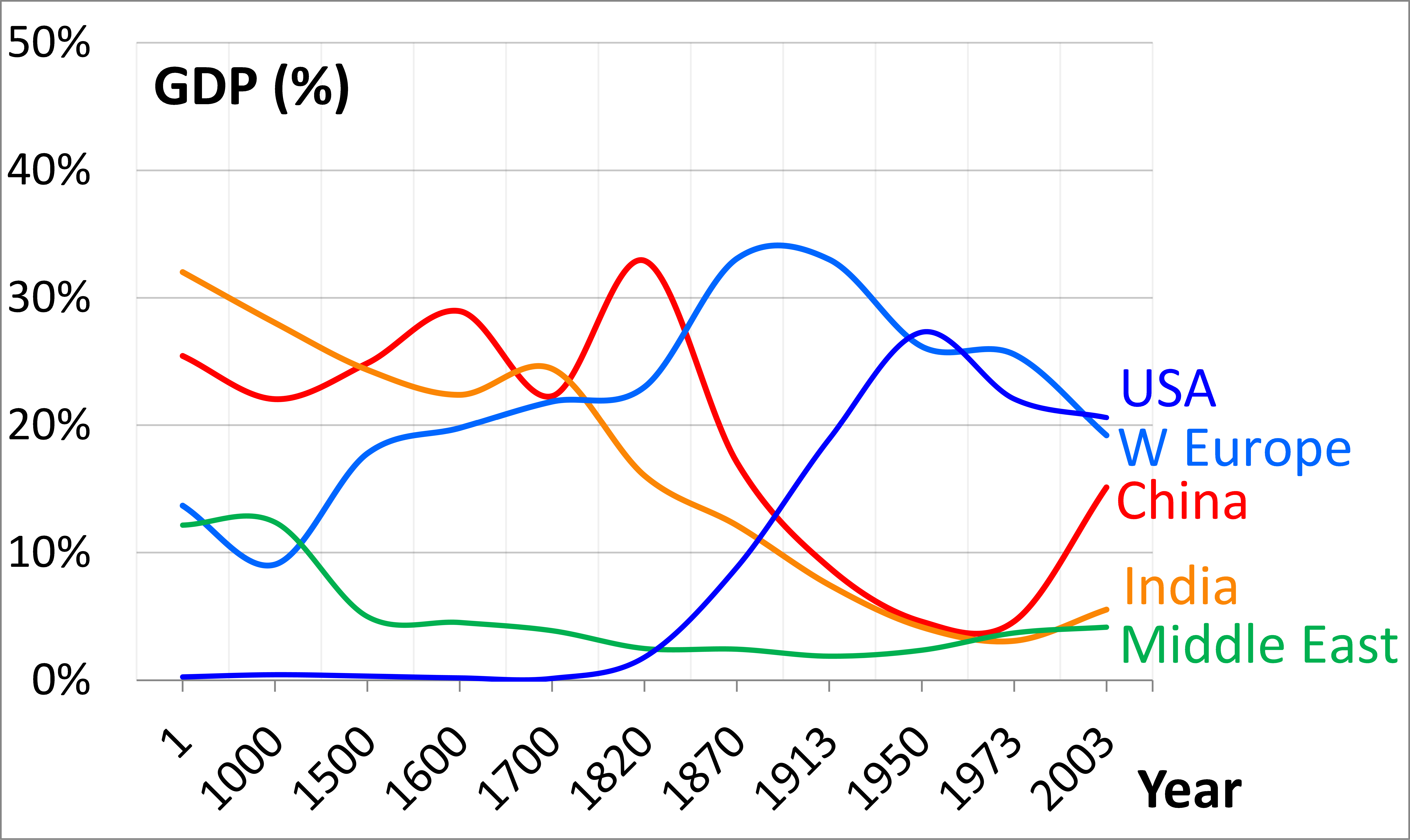
The global contribution to world's GDP by major economies from 1 CE to 2003 CE according to Angus Maddison's estimates. Up until the 18th century, China and India were the two largest economies by GDP output.

The Indus Valley Civilisation, the early civilisation of India and Pakistan, developed an economy based on agriculture and craft that later spread into central India. Angus Maddison estimates that from 1-1000 AD, the regions making up present-day India contributed roughly 30% of the world's population and GDP. India experienced per-capita GDP growth in the high medieval era.

By the late 17th century, the Mughal Empire under Aurangzeb reached its greatest extent and controlled most of South Asia by the time of Aurangzeb's death in 1707. The Indian economy, Maddison estimates, produced about 27% of global GDP by the early 18th century under Aurangzeb's reign.

Until the 18th century, India was one of the most important manufacturing centres in international trade. This manufacturing growth is often seen as a form of proto-industrialisation, similar to 18th-century Western Europe before the Industrial Revolution. According to Jeffrey Williamson, the Indian subcontinent deindustrialised in the latter half of the 18th century as an indirect outcome of the collapse of the Mughal Empire, and British rule later caused further deindustrialisation.

India experienced deindustrialisation and the cessation of various craft industries under British rule, which, along with fast economic and population growth in the Western world, resulted in India's share of the world economy declining from 23% in 1700 to 4.2% in 1950, and its share of global industrial output declining from 23% in 1750 to 2% in 1900. Because of its ancient history as a trading zone and later its colonial status, colonial India remained economically integrated with the world, with high levels of trade, investment, and migration.

From 1850 to 1947, India's GDP in 1990 international dollar terms grew from $125.7 billion to $213.7 billion, a 70% increase, or an average annual growth rate of 0.55%. In 1820, India's GDP was 16% of the global GDP. By 1870, it had fallen to 12%, and by 1947 to 4%. Broadberry, Custodis and Gupta estimate that Indian GDP per capita fell from over 60% of the British level to less than 15% by 1871. The Republic of India, founded in 1947, adopted central planning for most of its independent history, with extensive public ownership, regulation, red tape and trade barriers. After the 1991 economic crisis, the central government began a policy of economic liberalisation. GDP growth averaged about 3.6% a year in 1951-1974, rising to about 5.7% in 1981-1991, and 5.9% in 1992-2003. The World Bank estimates that extreme poverty, at $3 a day, fell from 27.1% in 2011-12 to 5.3% in 2022-23.

== Indus Valley Civilization ==
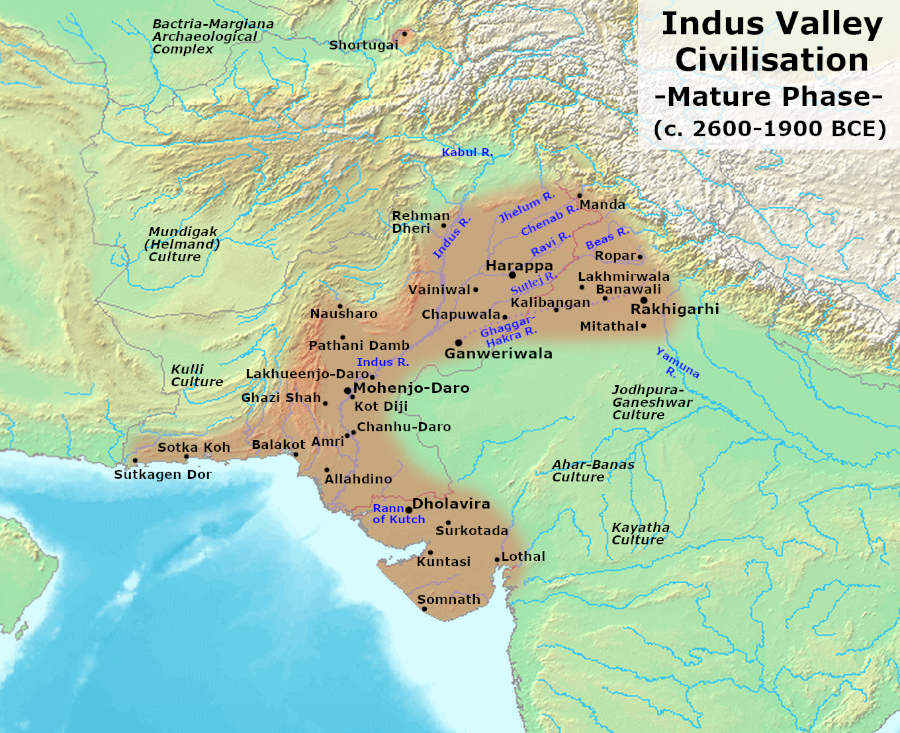
Mature Harappan Period, c. 2600–1900 BCE

The Indus Valley civilisation, one of the world's first known permanent and predominantly urban settlements, flourished between 3300 BCE and 1300 BCE. It featured an advanced and thriving economic system. Its citizens practised agriculture, domesticated animals, made sharp tools and weapons from copper, bronze and tin, and traded with other cities. Evidence of well-laid streets, drainage systems and water supply in the valley's major cities, Dholavira, Harappa, Lothal, Mohenjo-daro and Rakhigarhi, reveals their knowledge of urban planning.

== Ancient and medieval characteristics ==
Although ancient India had a significant urban population, much of India's population resided in villages, whose economies were largely isolated and self-sustaining. Agriculture was the predominant occupation and satisfied a village's food requirements while providing raw materials for hand-based industries such as textile, food processing and crafts. Besides farmers, people worked as barbers, carpenters, doctors (Ayurvedic practitioners), goldsmiths and weavers.

=== Family business ===
In the joint family system, members of a family pooled their resources to maintain the family and invest in business ventures. The system ensured younger members were trained and employed and that older and disabled members would be supported. The system prevented agricultural land from splitting with each generation, aiding yield from the benefits of scale. Such sanctions curbed rivalry in junior members and instilled a sense of obedience.

=== Organisational entities ===
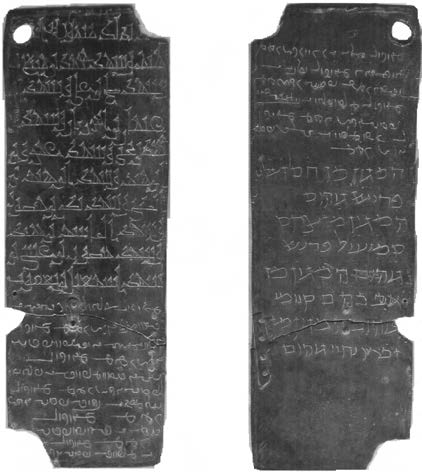
Tharisapalli plates granted to Saint Thomas Christians by South Indian Chera ruler Sthanu Ravi Varma testify that merchant guilds and trade corporations played a very significant role in the economy and social life during the Kulasekhara period of Kerala, India.

Along with the family and individually owned businesses, ancient India possessed other forms of engaging in collective activity, including the gana, pani, puga, vrata, sangha, nigama and Shreni. Nigama, pani and Shreni refer most often to economic organisations of merchants, craftspeople and artisans, and perhaps even para-military entities. In particular, the Shreni shared many similarities with modern corporations, which were used in India from around the 8th century BC until around the 10th century AD. The use of such entities in ancient India was widespread, including in virtually every kind of business, political and municipal activity.

The Shreni was a separate legal entity that had the ability to hold property separately from its owners, construct its own rules for governing the behaviour of its members and for it to contract, sue and be sued in its own name. Ancient sources such as Laws of Manu VIII and Chanakya's Arthashastra provided rules for lawsuits between two or more Shreni and some sources make reference to a government official (Bhandagarika) who worked as an arbitrator for disputes amongst Shreni from at least the 6th century BC onwards. Between 18 and 150 Shreni at various times in ancient India covered both trading and craft activities. This level of specialisation is indicative of a developed economy in which the Shreni played a critical role. Some Shreni had over 1,000 members.

The Shreni had a considerable degree of centralised management. The headman of the Shreni represented the interests of the Shreni in the king's court and in many business matters. The headman could bind the Shreni in contracts, set work conditions, often received higher compensation and was the administrative authority. The headman was often selected via an election by the members of the Shreni, and could also be removed from power by the general assembly. The headman often ran the enterprise with two to five executive officers, also elected by the assembly.

=== Coinage ===
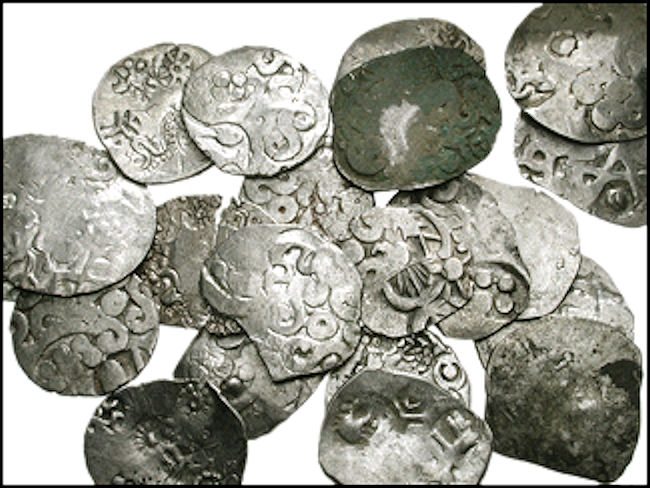
Silver coins of Kosala Mahajanapada, c. 525-465 BCE

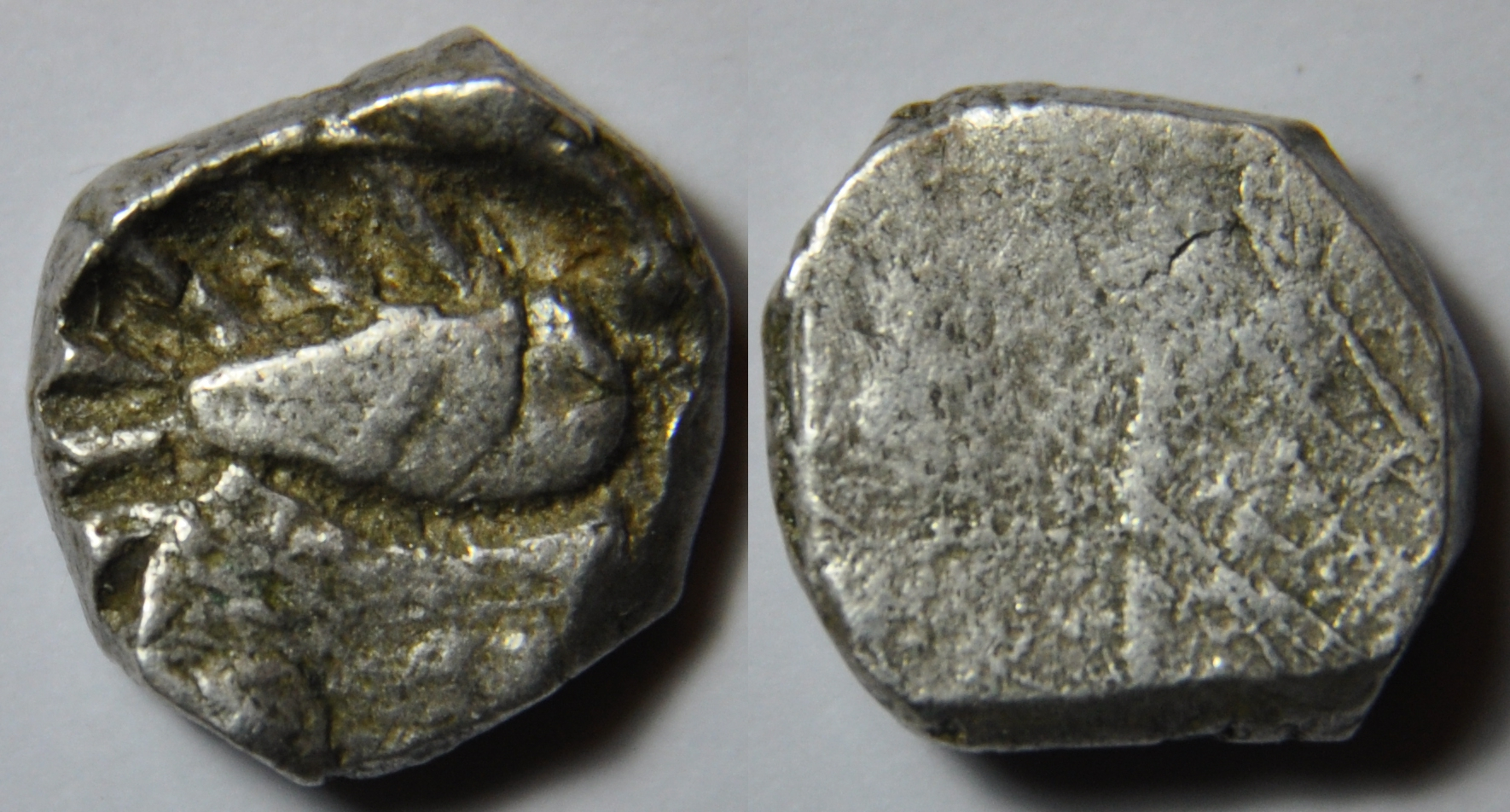
Silver coin of Avanti Mahajanapada, c. 400-312 BCE

Punch marked silver ingots were in circulation in the 6th-5th century BC. They were the first metallic coins minted around the 6th century BC by the Mahajanapadas of the Gangetic plains and were India's earliest traces of coinage.

== Maurya Empire ==
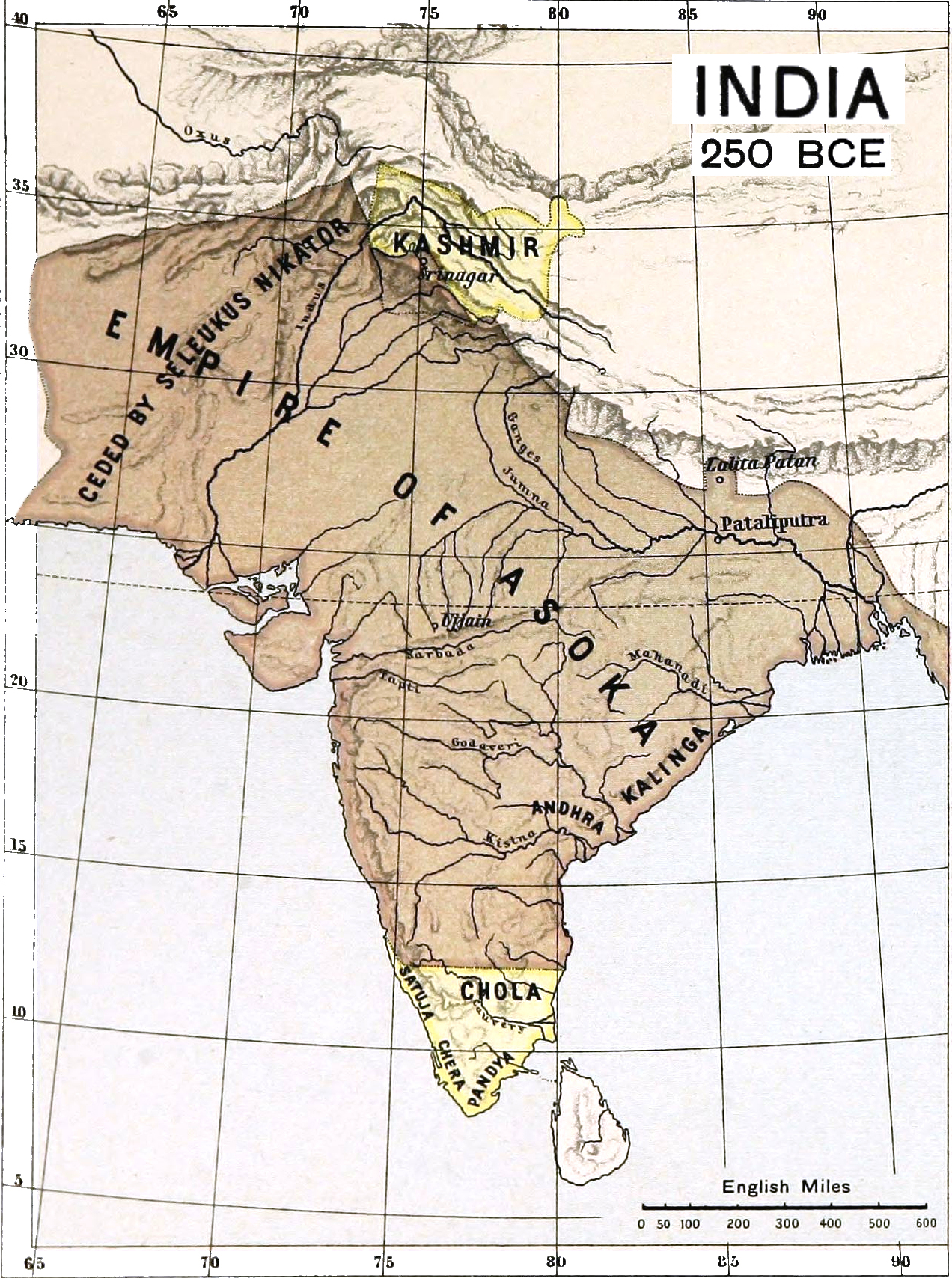
Maurya Empire under king Ashoka, c.250 BCE.

During the Maurya Empire (c. 321–185 BC), important changes and developments affected the Indian economy. It was the first time most of India was unified under one ruler. With an empire in place, trade routes became more secure.

Agriculture constituted the backbone of the Mauryan economy, with the state actively promoting land reclamation, settlement of cultivators, and the construction and maintenance of irrigation works such as canals and reservoirs, particularly in the Gangetic plains.

The Mauryan state exercised extensive control over trade, industry, and commerce, as described in the Arthashastra of Kautilya, which lays down detailed regulations regarding markets, prices, weights and measures, taxation, and state policies. The empire spent considerable resources building and maintaining roads.

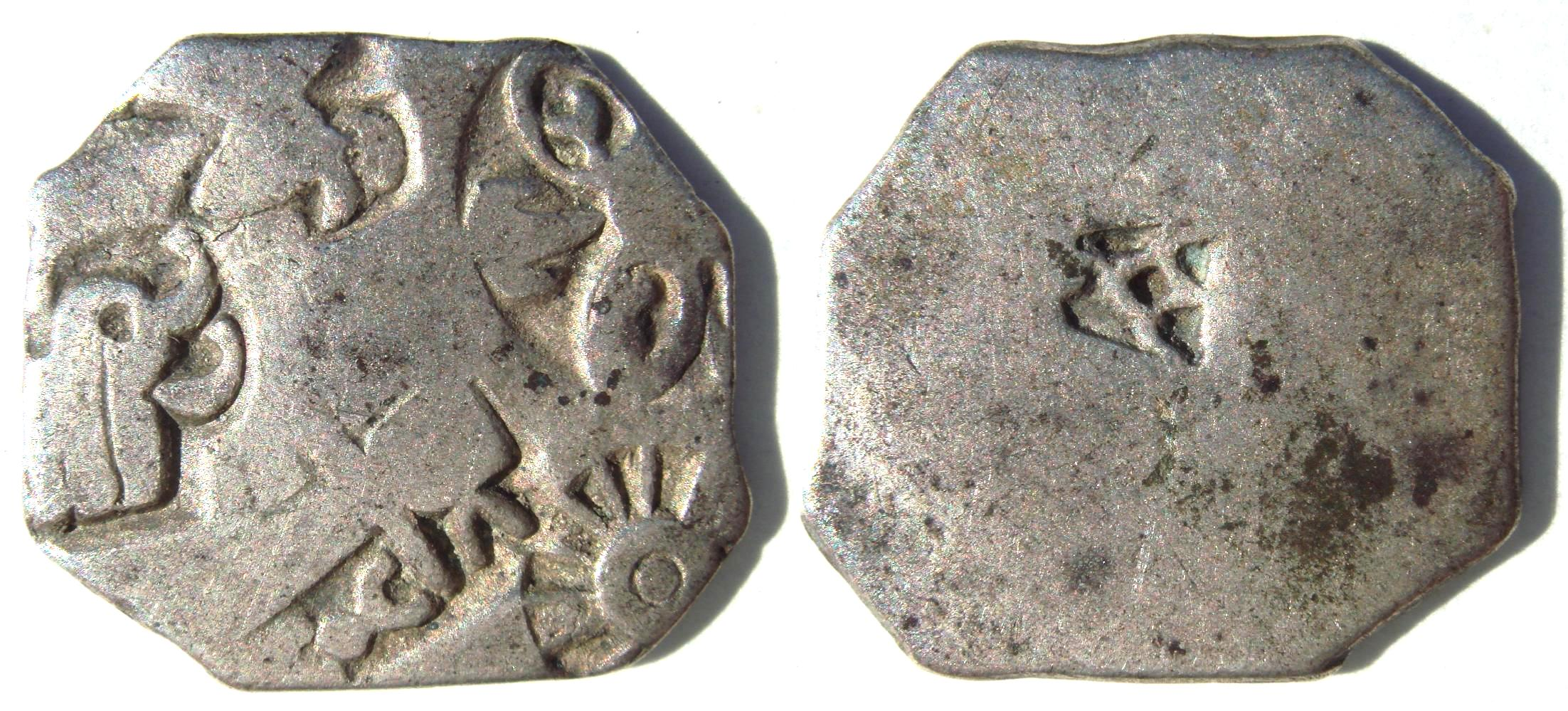
Silver coin of the Maurya Empire, 3rd century BC

The improved infrastructure, combined with increased security, greater uniformity in measurements, and increasing usage of punch-marked silver coins as the principal medium of exchange, reflecting a monetized economy with wide circulation of currency.

During this time India's share is estimated to have been from 32% to 35% of the world economy.

== Gupta Empire ==
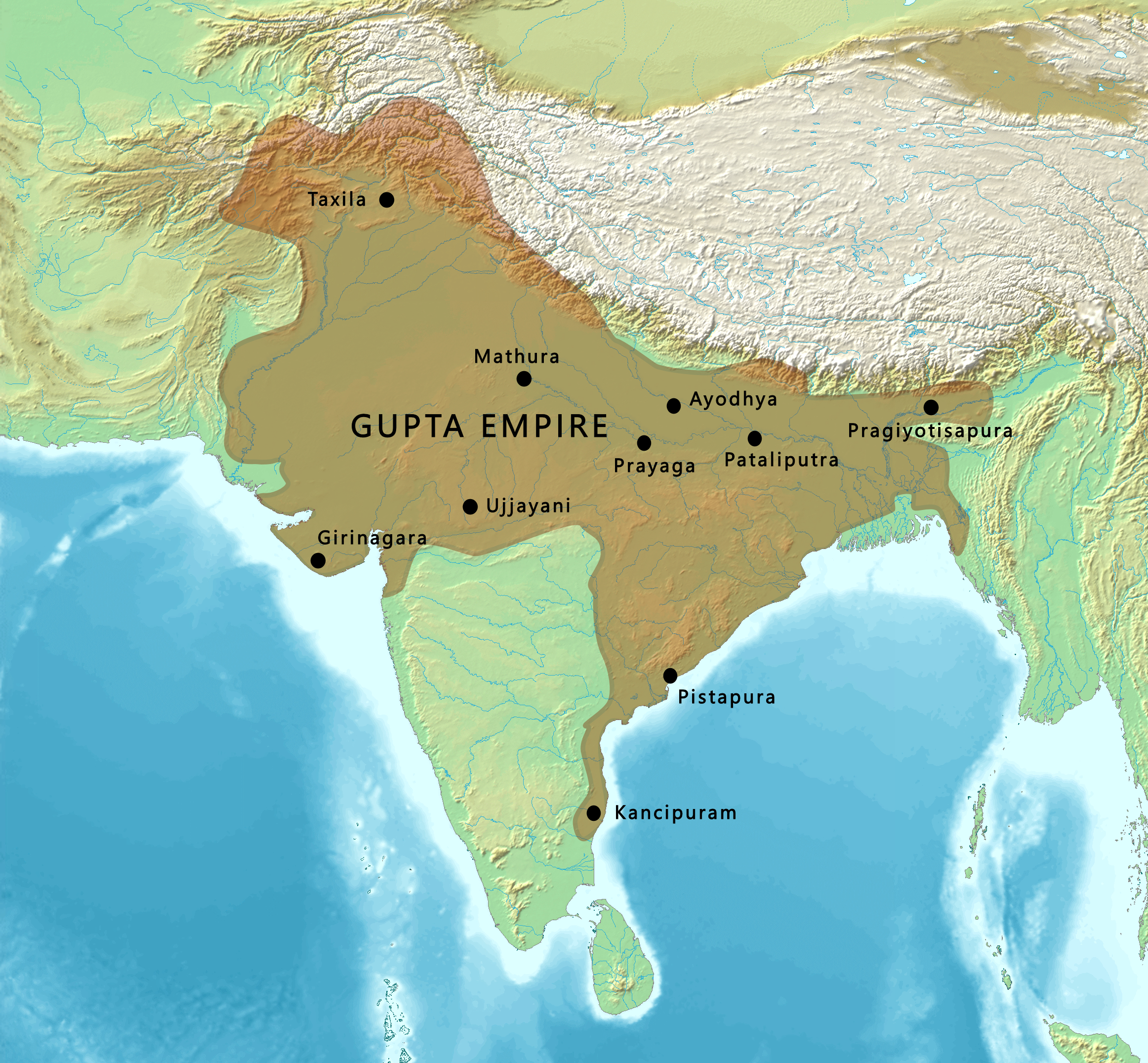
The Gupta Empire under Chandragupta II (375–415)

The period between the 4th and 6th centuries CE witnessed significant economic prosperity and marked by significant growth in trade, craft production, and monetization, leading many historians to describe the period as a Golden Age of India. Agriculture formed the backbone of the economy, supported by the widespread use of iron tools, expansion of cultivated land, and irrigation works such as wells, tanks, and canals.

Land revenue, and agricultural produce was the principal source of state income, though additional taxes and forced supplies were also levied.

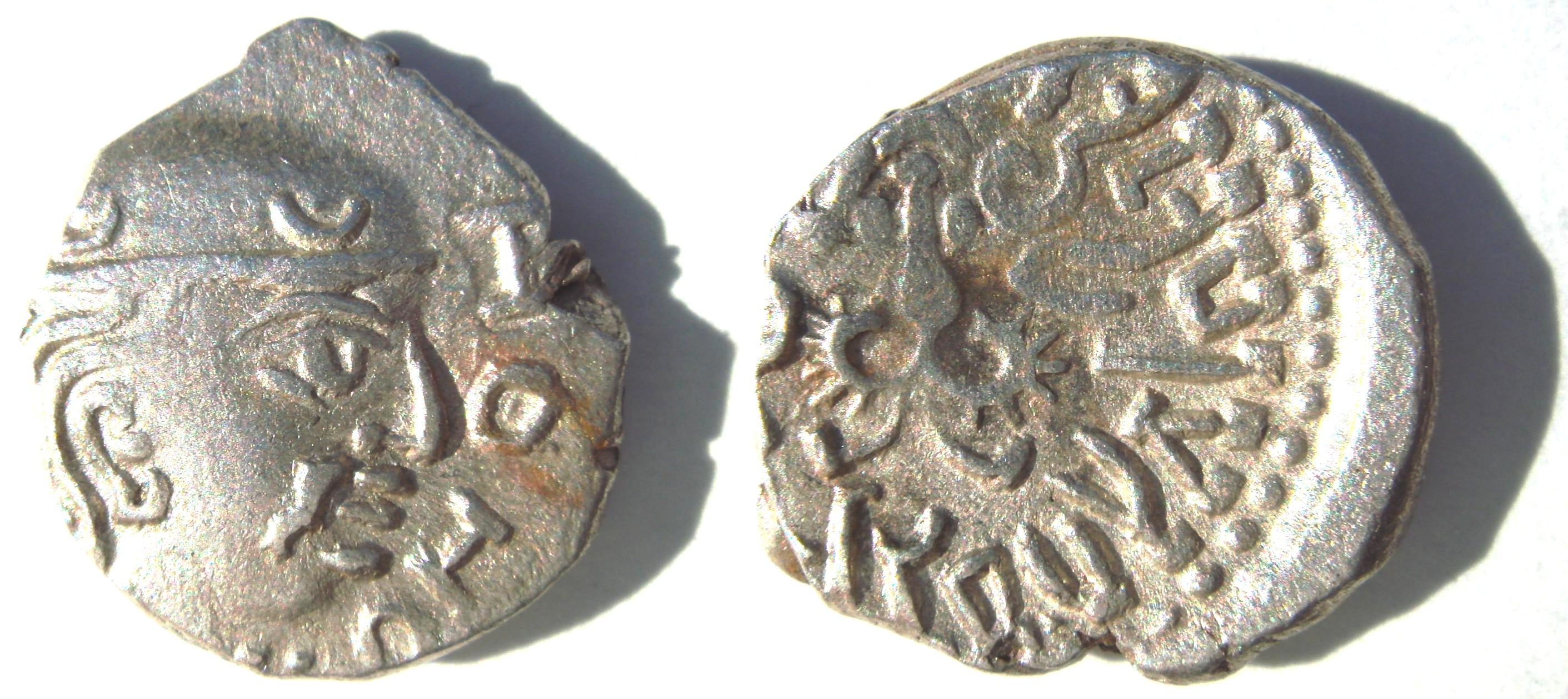
Silver coin of the Gupta dynasty, 5th century AD

Trade and commerce flourished during this period, with well-developed internal trade networks and extensive foreign trade with several civilisations such as the Roman Empire, Southeast Asia, China, and Central Asia, through both land and maritime routes.

Gupta administration proved to be highly conducive for the rapid growth of urban centres. The principal and original capital of the Gupta Empire is regarded to be Pataliputra.

The gross domestic product (GDP) of ancient India was estimated to be 32% and 28% of global GDP in 1 AD and 1000 AD, respectively. Also, during the first millennium of the Common Era, the Indian population comprised approximately 27.15%–30.3% of the total world population.

== Medieval India ==
The number of coins in circulation declined and instead credit arrangements predominated. Contemporary Hindu law devote increasing attention to sureties, collateral, promissory notes and compound interest.

Villages paid a portion of their agricultural produce as revenue to the rulers, while their craftsmen received a part of the crops at harvest time for their services.

=== Trade ===
Maritime trade was carried out extensively between South India and Southeast and West Asia from early times until around the 14th century AD. Both the Malabar and Coromandel Coasts were the sites of important trading centres from as early as the 1st century BC, used for import and export as well as transit points between the Mediterranean region and southeast Asia. Over time, traders organised themselves into associations which received state patronage. Historians Tapan Raychaudhuri and Irfan Habib claim this state patronage for overseas trade came to an end by the 13th century AD, when it was largely taken over by the local Parsi, Jewish, Syrian Christian and Muslim communities, initially on the Malabar and subsequently on the Coromandel coast.

Ateshgah of Baku

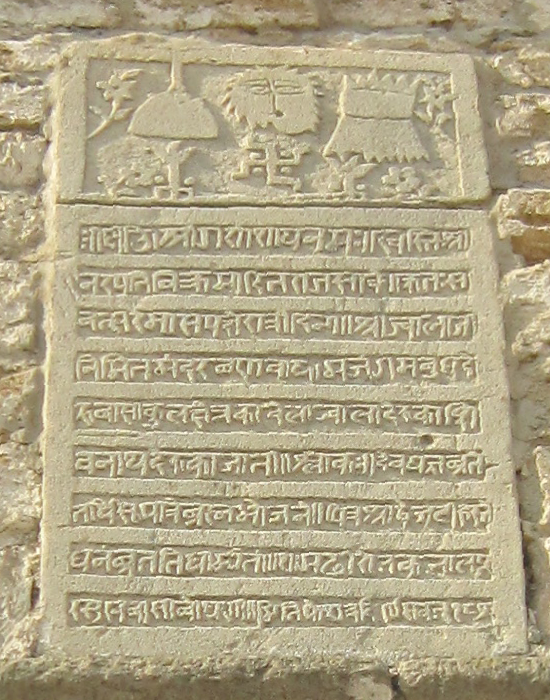
An inscribed invocation to Lord Shiva in Sanskrit at the Ateshgah

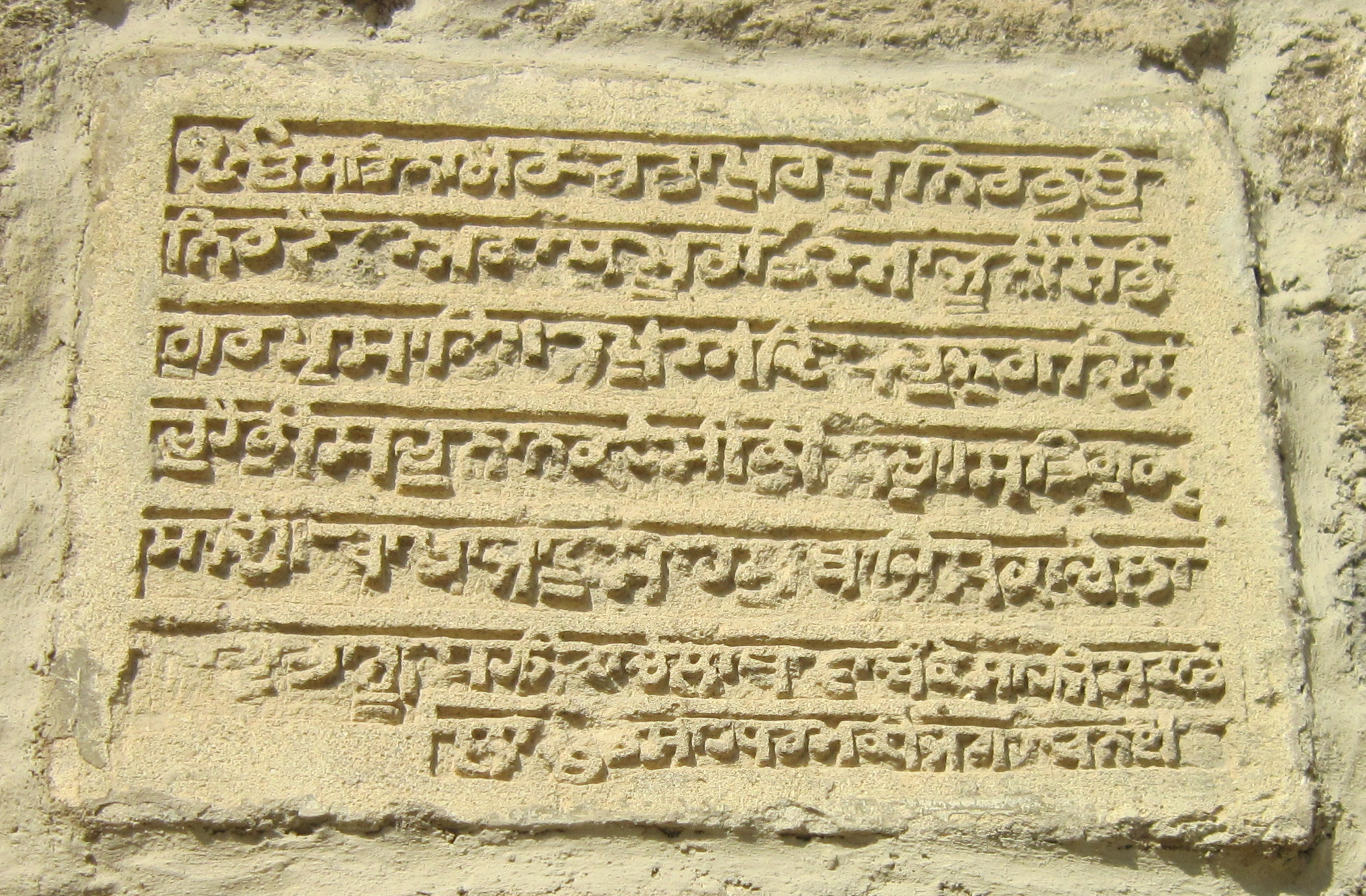
An inscribed invocation to the Adi Granth in Punjabi at the Ateshgah

Atashgah is a temple built by Indian traders before 1745, west of the Caspian Sea.

Other scholars suggest trading from India to West Asia and Eastern Europe was active between the 14th and 18th centuries. During this period, Indian traders settled in Surakhani, a suburb of greater Baku, Azerbaijan. These traders built a Hindu temple, which suggests commerce was active and prosperous for Indians by the 17th century.

Further north, the Saurashtra and Bengal coasts played an important role in maritime trade, and the Gangetic plains and the Indus valley housed several centres of river-borne commerce. Most overland trade was carried out via the Khyber Pass connecting the Punjab region with Afghanistan and onward to the Middle East and Central Asia.

== Delhi Sultanate ==
Before and during the Delhi Sultanate (1206–1526 AD), Islam underlay a cosmopolitan civilization. It offered wide-ranging international networks, including social and economic networks. They spanned large parts of Afro-Eurasia, leading to escalating circulation of goods, people, technologies and ideas. While initially disruptive, the Delhi Sultanate was responsible for integrating the Indian subcontinent into a growing world system.

The period coincided with greater use of mechanical technology in the Indian subcontinent. From the 13th century onwards, India began adopting some mechanical technologies from the Islamic world, including gears and pulleys, machines with cams and cranks. The worm gear roller cotton gin was invented in the Indian subcontinent during the 13th and 14th centuries, and is still used in India through to the present day. The incorporation of the crank handle in the cotton gin first appeared in the Indian subcontinent some time during the late Delhi Sultanate or the early Mughal Empire. The production of cotton, which may have largely been spun in the villages and then taken to towns in the form of yarn to be woven into cloth textiles, was advanced by the diffusion of the spinning wheel across India during the Delhi Sultanate era, lowering the costs of yarn and helping to increase demand for cotton. The increasing use of the spinning wheel, and the incorporation of the worm gear and crank handle into the roller cotton gin, led to greatly expanded Indian cotton textile production.

=== GDP estimates ===
According to economic historian Angus Maddison in Contours of the World Economy, 1–2030 AD: Essays in Macro-Economic History, the Indian subcontinent was the world's largest economic region from 1 AD to 1600 AD. Population and GDP estimates before 1950 include the modern territory of Pakistan and Bangladesh.

GDP (PPP) in 1990 international dollars
Year	GDP (PPP) (1990 dollars)	GDP per capita (1990 dollars)					Avg % GDP growth	% of world GDP (PPP)	Population	% of world population	Period
1	33,750,000,000	450					—	32.0	75,000,000	33.00	Classical era
1000	33,750,000,000	450					0.0	28.0	75,000,000	28.0	Early medieval era
1500	60,500,000,000	550					0.117	24.35	110,000,000	25.0	Late medieval era
Alternative estimates:											
1600	74,250,000,000	550	782	682	758	735	0.205	22.39	135,000,000	24.2	Early modern era
1700	90,750,000,000	550	719	622	697	676	0.201	24.43	165,000,000	27.36	Early modern era
1820	111,417,000,000	533	580	520	562	545	0.171	16.04	209,000,000	20.06	Early modern era
1870	134,882,000,000	533	526	526	510	494	0.975	12.14	253,000,000	19.83	Colonial era
1913	204,242,000,000	673				624	0.965	7.47	303,700,000	16.64	Colonial era
1940	265,455,000,000	696				636	0.976	5.9	386,800,000	16.82	Colonial era
1950	222,222,000,000	619				574	-1.794	4.17	359,000,000	14.11	Republic of India
1990	1,098,100,000,000	1,309				1,213	4.075	4.05	839,000,000	15.92	Republic of India

== Mughal Empire ==
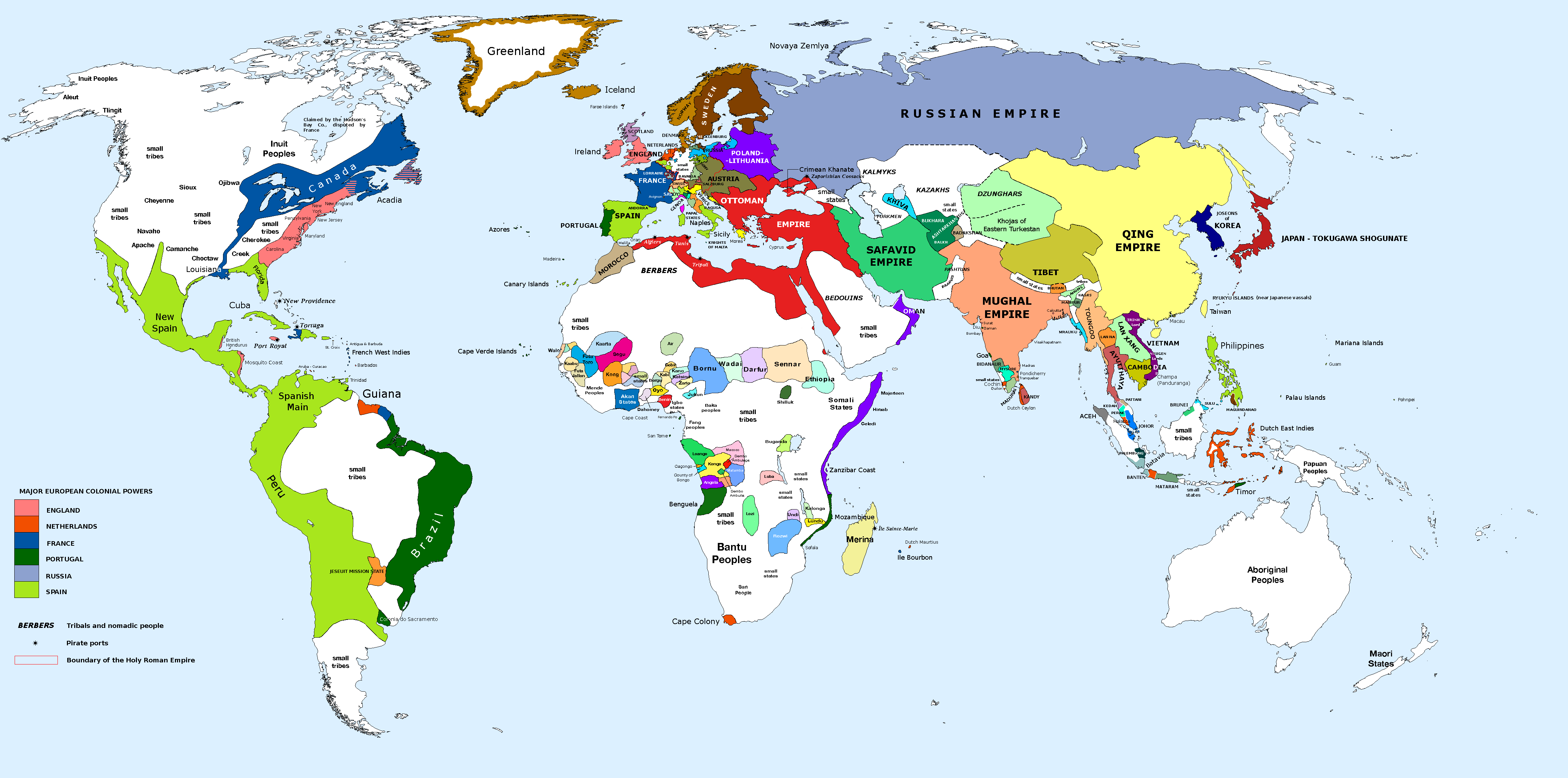
World map, c. 1700 CE

India's economy performed just as it did in ancient times, though now it would face the stress of extensive regional tensions. Parthasarathi estimated that 28,000 tonnes of bullion (mainly from the New World) flowed into the Indian subcontinent between 1600 and 1800, equating to 30% of the world's production in the period.

An estimate of the annual income of Emperor Akbar's treasury in 1600 is $90 million (in contrast to the tax take of Great Britain two hundred years later in 1800, which totaled $90 million). The Indian subcontinent region's economy was estimated to be the second largest in the world in 1600, only below China.

During the time of Akbar, the Mughal Empire was at its peak as it controlled the vast region of North India and had entered into alliances with the Deccan states. It enforced a uniform customs and tax-administration system. In 1700, the exchequer of the Emperor Aurangzeb reported an annual revenue of more than £100 million, or $450 million, more than ten times that of his contemporary Louis XIV of France, while controlling seventeen times the population.

India produced about 25% of global industrial output throughout the 1st century AD to up until mid-18th century. The Mughals were responsible for building an extensive road system, creating a uniform currency, and the unification of the country. The Mughals adopted and standardised the rupee currency introduced by Sur Emperor Sher Shah Suri. The Mughals minted tens of millions of coins, with purity of at least 96%, without debasement until the 1720s. The empire met global demand for Indian agricultural and industrial products.

Cities and towns experienced growth under the Mughal Empire, which had a relatively high degree of urbanization. By 1600, between 4.6% and 15% of India's population lived in urban areas, with the figure measuring between 6.4% and 11% around 1840. Several cities had a population between a quarter of a million and half a million, while some including Agra (in Agra Subah) hosted up to 800,000 people and Dhaka (in Bengal Subah) with over 1 million by some accounts. Shireen Moosvi estimates that 36% of the workforce were in the secondary and tertiary sectors, a higher percentage in non-primary sectors than eastern Europe at the time where 65–75% have been estimated to have been engaged in agriculture in 1750.

=== Agriculture ===
Indian agricultural production increased. Food crops included wheat, rice, and barley, while non-food cash crops included cotton, indigo and opium. By the mid-17th century, Indian cultivators had begun to extensively grow two crops from the Americas, maize and tobacco. Bengali peasants learned techniques of mulberry cultivation and sericulture, establishing Bengal Subah as a major silk-producing region. Agriculture was advanced compared to Europe, exemplified by the earlier common use of the seed drill. The Mughal administration emphasised agrarian reform, which began under the non-Mughal Emperor Sher Shah Suri. Akbar adopted this and added more reforms. The Mughal government funded the building of irrigation systems, which produced much higher crop yields and harvests.

One reform introduced by Akbar was a new land revenue system called zabt. He replaced the tribute system with a monetary tax system based on a uniform currency. The revenue system was biased in favour of higher value cash crops such as cotton, indigo, sugar cane, tree-crops, and opium, providing state incentives to grow cash crops, adding to rising market demand. Under the zabt system, the Mughals conducted extensive cadastral surveying to assess the cultivated area. The Mughal state encouraged greater land cultivation by offering tax-free periods to those who brought new land under cultivation.

According to evidence cited by economic historians Immanuel Wallerstein, Irfan Habib, Percival Spear, and Ashok Desai, per-capita agricultural output and standards of consumption in 17th-century Mughal India was equal in 17th-century Europe and early 20th-century British India.

=== Manufacturing ===
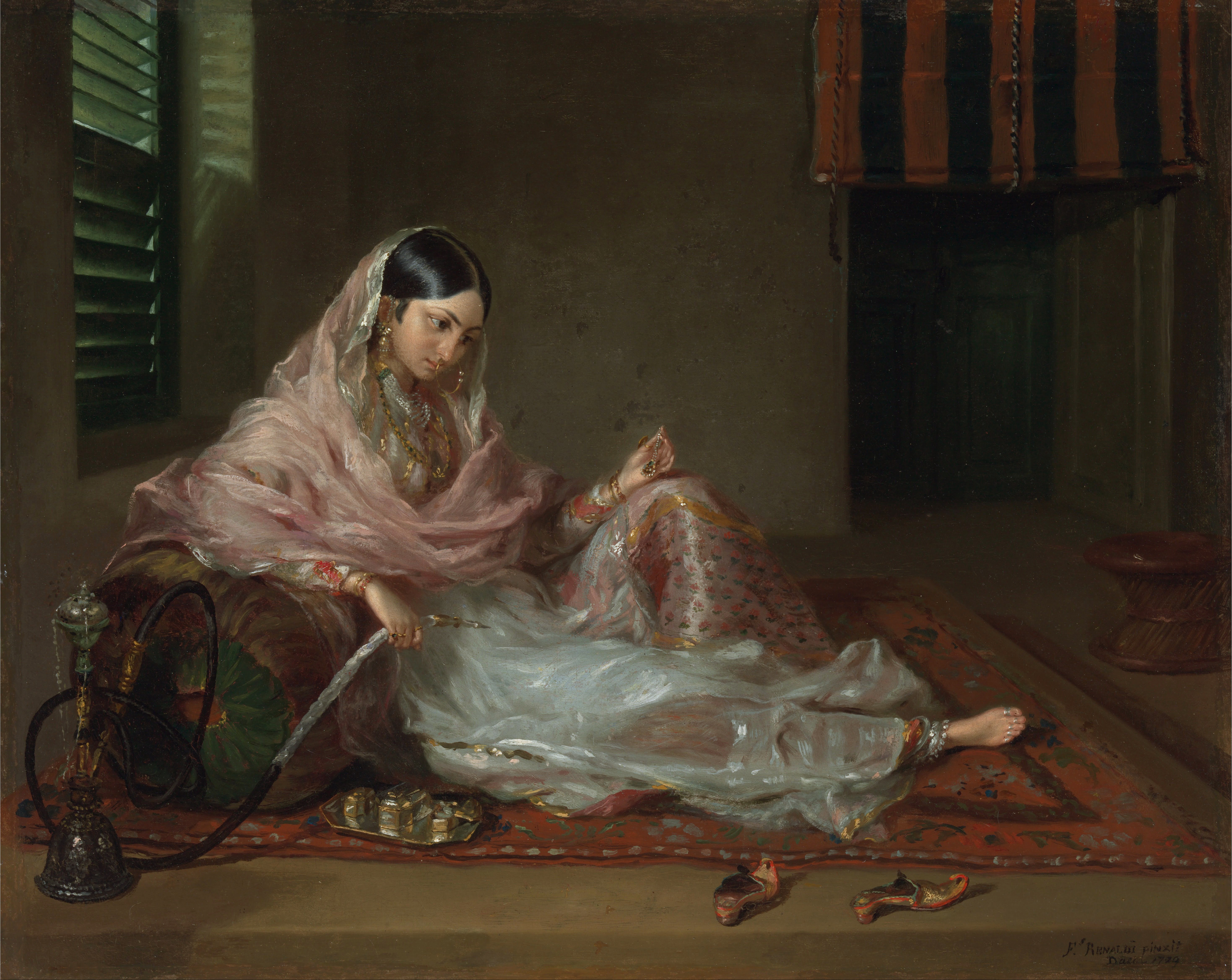
A woman in Dhaka clad in fine Bengali muslin, painted 1789 CE

Until the 18th century, Mughal India was one of the most important manufacturing centers in international trade. Key industries included textiles, shipbuilding and steel. Processed products included cotton textiles, yarns, thread, silk, jute products, metalware, and foods such as sugar, oils and butter. This growth of manufacturing has been seen as a form of proto-industrialization, similar to 18th-century Western Europe prior to the Industrial Revolution.

Early modern Europe imported products from Mughal India, particularly cotton textiles, spices, peppers, indigo, silks and saltpeter (for use in munitions). European fashion, for example, became somewhat dependent on Indian textiles and silks. From the late 17th century to the early 18th century, Mughal India accounted for 95% of British imports from Asia, and the Bengal Subah province alone accounted for 40% of Dutch imports from Asia. Demand for European goods in Mughal India was lighter, Europe's exports being largely limited to some woolens, ingots, glassware, mechanical clocks, weapons, particularly blades for Firangi swords, and a few luxury items. The trade imbalance caused Europeans to export large quantities of silver and to a lesser extent gold to Mughal India to pay for South Asian imports. Indian goods, especially those from Bengal, were also exported in large quantities to other Asian markets, such as Indonesia and Japan.

The largest manufacturing industry was cotton textile manufacturing, which included the production of piece goods, calicos and muslins, available unbleached in a variety of colours. The cotton textile industry was responsible for a large part of the empire's international trade. The most important center of cotton production was the Bengal Subah province, particularly around Dhaka. Bengal alone accounted for more than 50% of textiles and around 80% of silks imported by the Dutch. Bengali silk, cotton textiles, and cowrie shells were exported in large quantities to Europe, Indonesia, Japan, and Africa, where they formed a significant element in the exchange of goods for slaves, and treasure. In Britain protectionist policies, such as 1685-1774 Calico Acts, imposed tariffs on imported Indian textiles.

Mughal India had a large shipbuilding industry, particularly in the Bengal Subah province. Economic historian Indrajit Ray estimates shipbuilding output of Bengal during the 16th and 17th centuries at 223,250 tons annually, compared with 23,061 tons produced in nineteen British colonies in North America from 1769 to 1771.

Bengal Subah

Bengal Subah was the Mughal Empire's wealthiest province, globally prominent in industries such as textile manufacturing and shipbuilding. and exporting silk and cotton textiles, steel, saltpeter and agricultural and industrial products. Bengal's capital city Dhaka was the empire's financial capital, with a population said to exceed one million.

Domestically, much of India depended on Bengali products such as rice, silks and cotton textiles.

Post–Mughal Empire (1730–1818)

In the early half of the 18th century, Mughal Empire fell into decline, with Delhi sacked in Nader Shah's invasion of the Mughal Empire, the treasury emptied, tens of thousands killed, and many thousands more carried off, with their livestock, as slaves, weakening the empire and leading to the emergence of post-Mughal states. The Mughals were replaced by the Marathas as the dominant military power in much of India, while the other smaller regional kingdoms who were mostly late Mughal tributaries, such as the Nawabs in the north and the Nizams in the south, declared autonomy. However, the Mughal tax administration system was left largely intact with somewhat change with Tapan Raychaudhuri estimating revenue assessment actually increased to 50 percent or more, in contrast to China's 5 to 6 percent, to cover the cost of the wars. Similarly in the same period, Maddison gives the following estimates for the late Mughal economy's income distribution:

Late Mughal economy's income distribution (c. 1750)
Social group	% of population	% of total income	Income in terms of per-capita mean
Nobility, Zamindars	1	15	15
Merchants to Sweapers	17	37	2.2
Village Economy	72	45	0.6
Tribal Economy	10	3	0.3
Total	100	100	1

Among the post-Mughal states that emerged in the 18th century, the dominant economic powers were Maratha Empire, Bengal Subah (under the Nawabs of Bengal) and the South Indian Kingdom of Mysore.

Jeffrey G. Williamson argued that India went through a period of deindustrialization in the latter half of the 18th century as an indirect outcome of the collapse of the Mughal Empire, and that British rule later caused further deindustrialization. though Indian textiles maintained a competitive advantage over British textiles until the 19th century. Prasannan Parthasarathi countered that several post-Mughal states did not decline, notably Bengal, Marathas and Mysore, which were comparable to Britain into the late 18th century.

== British rule ==
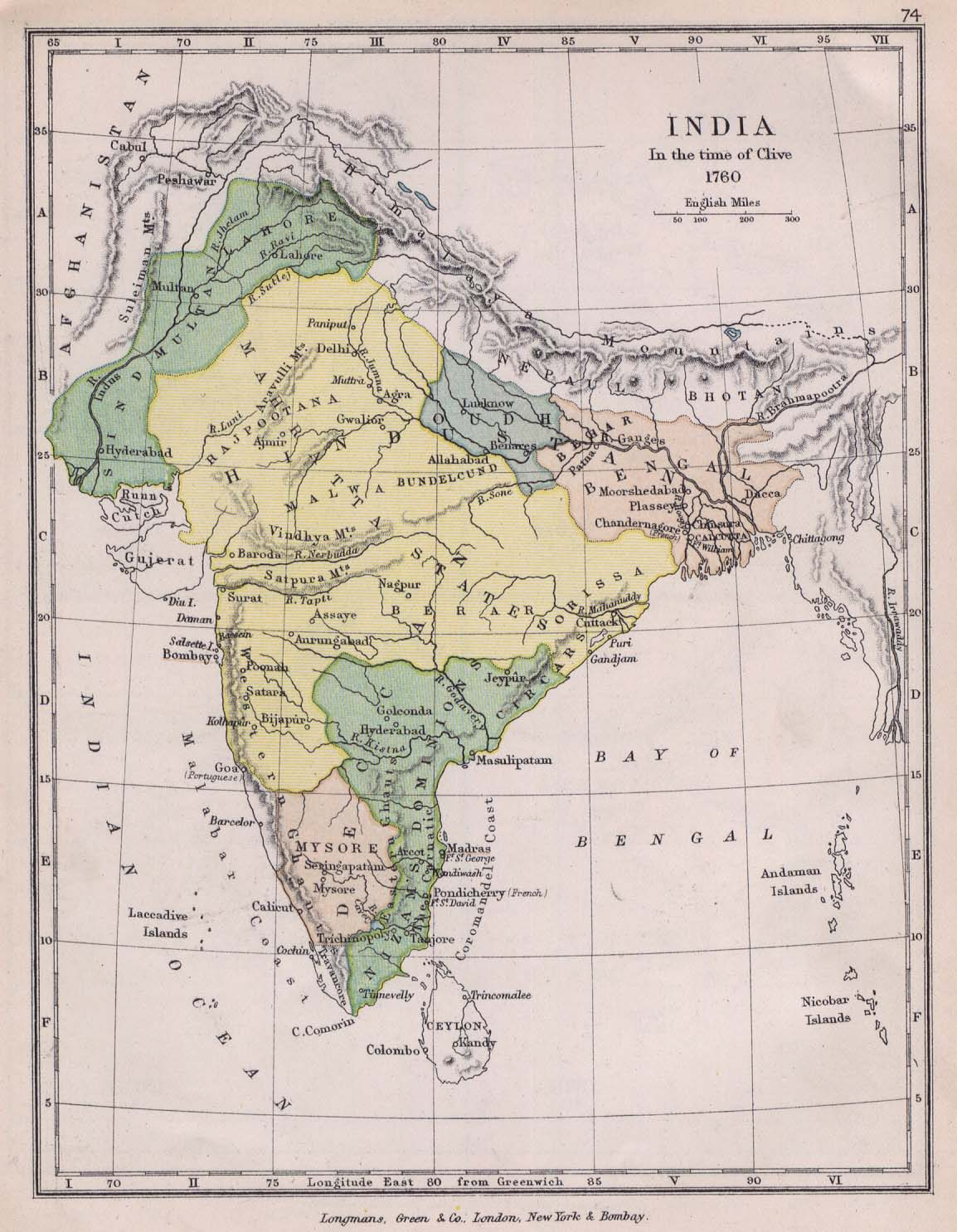
East India Company concessions, 1760

A year after the loss of the British East India Company trading base of Calcutta, along with the hoard of imported bullion, to the new Nawab of the Bengal Subah, Siraj ud-Daulah, the Company won a decisive victory over the Nawab, and his French East India Company allies, at the Battle of Plassey, in 1757. The victory was achieved through agreeing to appoint the Nawab's military commander, Mir Jafar, as a Company friendly replacement, if he turned Siraj ud-Daulah's numerically superior forces on his masters household, and partitioned the Nawab's treasury, to compensate both parties. The Company regained, and fortified Calcutta, later gaining the right to collect tax revenues, on the Nawabs behalf, in the Bengal Subah, from 1765, a right to trade tax free, fortify the cities and factories it established, along with a right to establish local armies, turning the mercantile company, into the effective state apparatus, and later proxy for the British Crown. Following the Indian Rebellion of 1857, the British Crown would intervene and establish a formal colonial administration in the Company controlled territory.

=== British East India Company rule ===
Immediately following the East India Company gaining the right to collect revenue, on behalf of the Nawab of Bengal, the Company largely ceased a century and a half practice of importing gold and silver, and for more than a decade, which it had hitherto used to pay for the goods shipped back to Britain, the American colonies, East Asia, or on to African Slavers, to be bartered for Slaves in the Atlantic Slave trade:

Export of bullion to India, by EIC (1708–1810)
Years	Bullion (£)	Average per annum
1708/9-1733/4	12,189,147	420,315
1734/5-1759/60	15,239,115	586,119
1760/1-1765/6	842,381	140,396
1766/7-1771/2	968,289	161,381
1772/3-1775/6	72,911	18,227
1776/7-1784/5	156,106	17,345
1785/6-1792/3	4,476,207	559,525
1793/4-1809/10	8,988,165	528,715

In addition, as under Mughal rule, land and opium revenue collected in the Bengal Presidency helped finance the company's administration, raise Sepoy armies, and fund wars in other parts of India, and later further afield, for example the Opium Wars, with additional capital raised, at typically 10%, from Banias money lenders.

In the period 1760–1800, Bengal's money supply was greatly diminished. The closing of some local mints and close supervision of the rest, the fixing of exchange rates and the standardization of coinage added to the economic downturn.

During this period, the East India Company began tax administration reforms in a fast expanding empire spread over 250 million acres (1,000,000 km^{2}), or 35 percent of Indian domain, with regional land, opium and salt taxes set, and collected. Indirect rule was established on protectorates and buffer states.

During the period 1780–1860 India changed from an exporter of processed goods paid for in bullion to an exporter of raw materials and a buyer of manufactured goods.

The abolition of the Atlantic slave trade, from 1807, both eliminated a significant export market, and encouraged Caribbean plantations to organize the import of South Asian labor.

British economic policies gave them a monopoly over India's large market and cotton resources.

Textiles

In the 1750s fine cotton and silk was exported from India to markets in Europe, Americas, Asia, and Africa. With East India Company supplied cotton pieces comprising approximately 30%, by value, of the trade goods bartered for Slaves in the Anglo-African Triangular trade, and featuring in the French and Arab slave trades.

East India Company buyers, along with independent British, Dutch and French East India company buyers, historically competed against each other, to place pre-paid advanced orders with Bengali middlemen for quantities of cotton pieces (Bolts of cloth approximately 18 yards by one yard in size), of a specified quality, and pattern, for delivery the following year. The middlemen often failed to deliver the ordered quantity, or quality, to the contracted party, with pieces purchased with one companies money, from local weavers across the region, instead sold to a higher bidder. Post the East India Company gaining administrative authority over Bengal, the Company forced the local merchants to fulfil its orders before servicing those of other parties, leading to protest, both from the local middlemen and competing East India Companies. As they did they after the British East India Company started dictating the price of yarn sold within the region, which had historically accounted for the majority of the cost of a cotton piece. The actions though not impacting local product, financially benefitted the Calcutta administration, over the local middlemen and the competing Companies engaged in the international trade.

From the late 18th century British industry began to lobby their government to reintroduce the Calico Acts, and again start taxing Indian textile imports, while in parallel allow them access to the markets of India. Which the UK parliaments partly conceded to, with removal of the East India Company's two hundred year old monopoly on most British trade with India, via the Charter Act 1813, forcing the till then protected Indian market to open to British goods, which could now be sold in India without Company tariffs or duties. Starting in the early 19th century, British textiles began to appear in the Indian markets, with the value of the textile imports growing from £5.2 million in 1850 to £18.4 million in 1896. Raw cotton was imported without tariffs to British factories, which manufactured yarn and textiles and sold them back to India, also without tariffs.

Estimated domestic Indian cotton consumption, production and imports & exports with Britain
Year	Cotton consumption (m yds)	Domestic production (m yds)	Domestic production (1871=100)	Imports from Britain (m yds)	Exports to Britain (pieces)
1600	946	946	72.4	0	
1650	876	876	67.1	0	
1700	970	970	74.3	0	868,095
1750	1,098	1,098	84	0	701,485
1801	1,178	1,178	90.2	0	1,037,440
1811	1,076	1,075	82.3	1	691,640
1821	1,046	1,026	78.6	20	758,397
1831	1,139	1,101	84.3	38	287,814
1841	1,407	1,266	97	141	
1851	1,722	1,374	105.2	348	
1861	1,989	1,475	112.9	514	
1871	2,099	1,306	100	793	

Indian historian, Rajat Kanta Ray, noted the relative decline of the Indian cotton textile industry started in the mid-1820s. The pace of its decline was, however, slow though steady at the beginning, but reached a crisis by 1860, when 563,000 textile workers lost their jobs. Ray estimates that the industry shrank by about 28% by 1850. However, it survived in the high-end and low-end domestic markets. Ray argued that British discriminatory policies undoubtedly depressed the industry's exports, but suggests its decay is better explained by technological innovations in Britain. With Amiya Bagchi estimating the impact of the invention of the spinning mule on the employment of hand spinners:

Population of Gangetic Bihar dependent on different occupations %
Occupation	1809–1813	1901
Spinners	10.3	–
Spinners / Weavers	2.3	1.3
Other Industrial	9.0	7.2
TOTAL	21.6	8.5

Indian textiles had maintained a competitive advantage over British textiles up until the 19th century, when Britain eventually overtook India as the world's largest cotton textile manufacturer. In 1811, Bengal was still a major exporter of cotton cloth to the Americas and the Indian Ocean. However, Bengali cotton exports declined over the course of the early 19th century, as British imports to Bengal increased, from 25% in 1811 to 93% in 1840.

The second quarter of the 19th century, raw materials, which chiefly consisted of raw cotton, opium, and indigo, accounted for most of India's exports. By the end of the 1930s Indian textiles, and raw cotton, jute, hemp, and silk exports exceed $200 million, annually.

Mining

Exploitable mineral deposits had started to be identified under the East India Company, with the first Coal mines, along with the Geological Survey of India established to identify and map the available resources in the territory. A modern Iron and steel industry in India would be established in the Second half of the 19th century, with over 3 million tonnes of metals produced annually, and 25 million tonnes of coal, by the 1940s.

Roads

The East India Companies' trade, and industry enabling metalled road network was expanded from the 2,500 kilometres (1,600 mi), constructed to 1850, to 350,000 kilometres (220,000 mi) by 1943.

Indian ordnance factories

In 1787, a Gunpowder Factory was established at Ishapore; it began production in 1791, it is now the Rifle Factory Ishapore, beginning in 1904. In 1801, Gun & Shell Factory, Calcutta was established and the production began on 18 March 1802. There were eighteen ordnance factories before India became independent in 1947.

Paper and publishing

Under the EIC the first Indian authored publications, printed, on locally produced paper, produced in locally established paper mills, appeared, from the Hicky's Bengal Gazette, to by the 1940s, a hundred thousand tonnes of paper was being produced, annually.

=== British Raj ===
The formal dissolution of the Mughal Empire heralded a change in British treatment of Indian subjects. During the British Raj, massive railway projects were begun in earnest and government jobs and guaranteed pensions attracted a large number of upper caste Hindus into the civil service for the first time. British cotton exports absorbed 55 percent of the Indian market by 1875. In the 1850s the first cotton mills opened in Bombay, posing a challenge to the cottage-based home production system based on family labour. Real GDP per capita grew 14 per cent during 1870–1906.

Fall of the rupee

Price of silver – Rate of Exchange: 1871–72 to 1892–93
Period	Price of silver (in pence per troy ounce)	Rupee exchange rate (in pence)
1871–1872	60 1/2	23 1/8
1875–1876	56 3/4	21 5/8
1879–1880	51 1/4	20
1883–1884	50 1/2	19 1/2
1887–1888	44 5/8	18 7/8
1890–1951	47 11/16	18 1/8
1891–1892	45	16 3/4
1892–1893	39	15
Source: B.E. Dadachanji. History of Indian Currency and Exchange, 3rd enlarged ed. (Bombay: D.B. Taraporevala Sons & Co, 1934), p. 15

During the American Civil War, the US Dollar halved in value to ₹1.54 by 1864. After its victory in the Franco-Prussian War (1870–71), Germany extracted a huge indemnity from France of £200,000,000, and then moved to join Britain on a gold monetary standard. France, the US, and other industrialising countries followed Germany in adopting gold after the Panic of 1873. Countries such as Japan that did not have the necessary access to gold or those, such as India, that were subject to imperial policies remained mostly on a silver standard. Silver-based and gold-based economies then diverged dramatically. The worst affected were silver economies that traded mainly with gold economies. Silver reserves increased in size, causing gold to rise in relative value. The impact on silver-based India was profound, given that most of its trade was with Britain and other gold-based countries. As the price of silver fell, so too did the exchange value of the rupee, when measured against sterling.

Agriculture and industry

The Indian economy grew at about 1% per year from 1890 to 1910, in line with, and largely dependent on increased agricultural output, through schemes such as the Punjab Canal Colonies, Ganges canal, and cultivation of 4,000,000 acres of Assam jungle, which the growth of land under cultivation only keeping pace with a population that doubled in the same period. The result was little change in Real income levels. Agriculture was still dominant, with most peasants at the subsistence level.

Entrepreneur Jamsetji Tata (1839–1904) began his industrial career in 1877 with the Central India Spinning, Weaving, and Manufacturing Company in Bombay. While other Indian mills produced cheap coarse yarn (and later cloth) using local short-staple cotton and simple machinery imported from Britain, Tata did much better by importing expensive longer-stapled cotton from Egypt and buying more complex ring-spindle machinery from the United States to spin finer yarn that could compete with imports from Britain.

In the 1890s, Tata launched plans to expand into the heavy industry using Indian funding. The Raj did not provide capital, but aware of Britain's declining position against the US and Germany in the steel industry, it wanted steel mills in India so it promised to purchase any surplus steel Tata could not otherwise sell.

By the end of the 1930s, cotton, jute, peanuts, tea, tobacco, and hides accounted for the majority of the $500+ million of agricultural derived, annual exports.

Railways

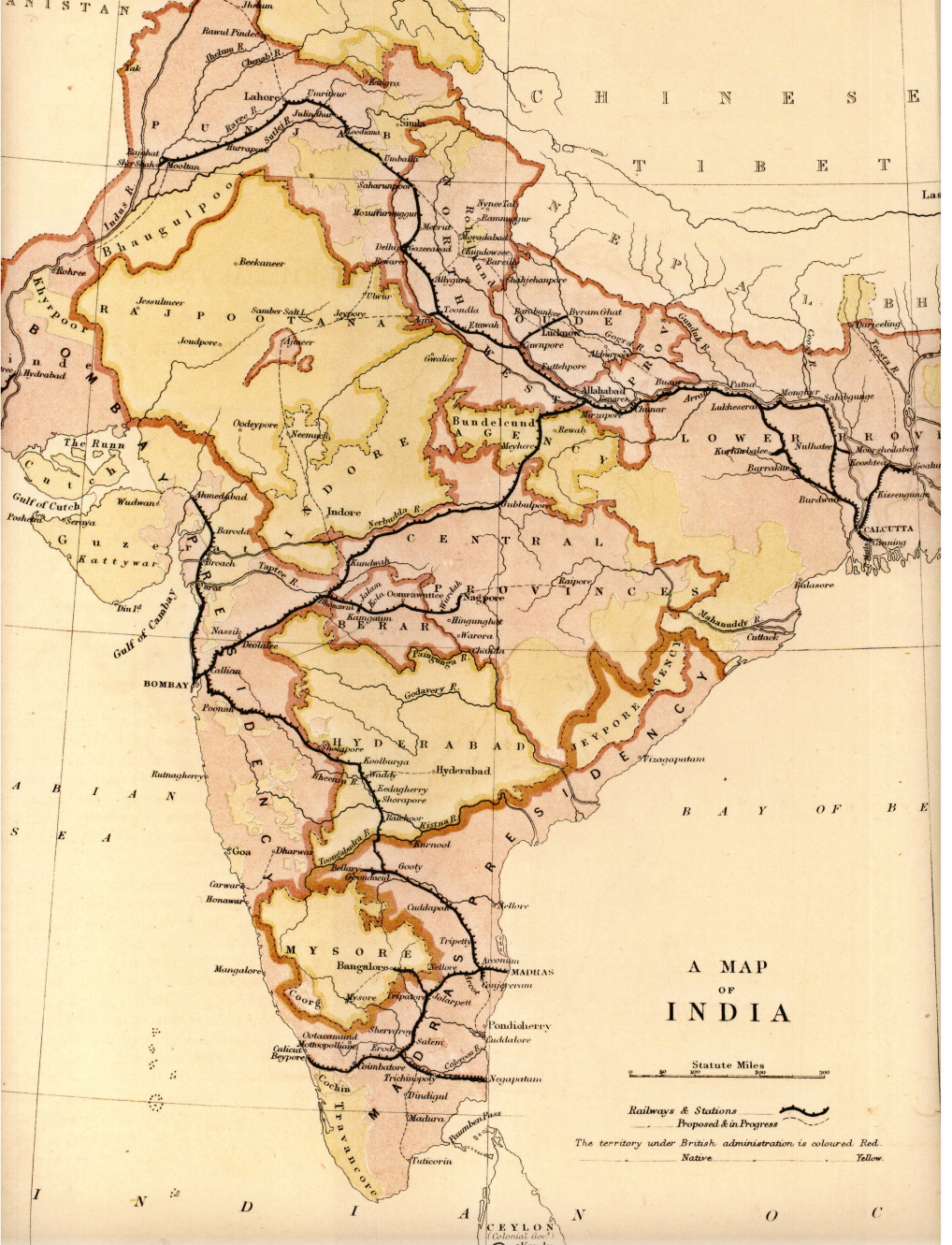
Railway map of India in 1871 CE

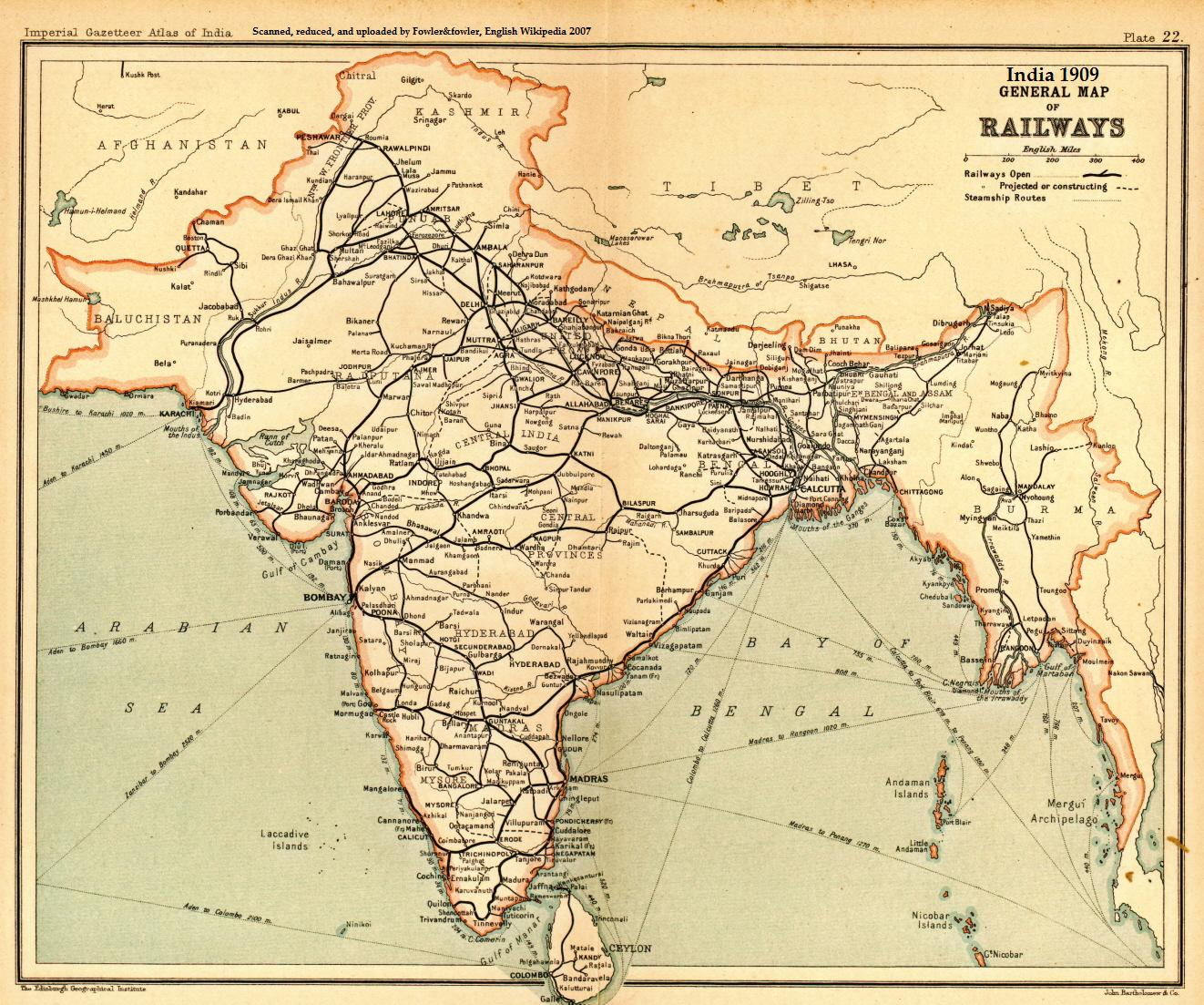
Railway map of India in 1909 CE

British investors built a modern railway system in the late 19th century—it became the then fourth-largest in the world and was renowned for the quality of construction and service. The government was supportive, realising its value for military use and for economic growth. The railways at first were privately owned and operated, and run by British administrators, engineers and skilled craftsmen. At first, only the unskilled workers were Indians.

A plan for a rail system was first advanced in 1832. The first train ran from Red Hills to Chintadripet bridge in Madras, inaugurated in 1837. It was called Red Hill Railway. It was used for freight transport. A few more short lines were built in the 1830s and 1840s. They did not interconnect and were used for freight forwarding. The East India Company (and later the colonial government) encouraged new railway companies backed by private investors under a scheme that would provide land and guarantee an annual return of up to five percent during the initial years of operation. The companies were to build and operate the lines under a 99-year lease, with the government retaining the option to buy them earlier. In 1854 Governor-General Lord Dalhousie formulated a plan to construct a network of trunk lines connecting the principal regions. A series of new rail companies were established, leading to rapid expansion.

In 1853, the first passenger train service was inaugurated between Bori Bunder in Bombay and Thane, covering a distance of 34 km (21 mi). The route mileage of this network increased from 1,349 km (838 mi) in 1860 to 25,495 km (15,842 mi) in 1880 – mostly radiating inland from the port cities of Bombay, Madras and Calcutta. Most of the railway construction was done by Indian companies supervised by British engineers. The system was sturdily built. Several large princely states built their own rail systems and the network spread across India. By 1900 India had a full range of rail services with diverse ownership and management, operating on broad, metre and narrow gauge networks.

Headrick argues that both the Raj lines and the private companies hired only European supervisors, civil engineers and even operating personnel, such as locomotive engineers. The government's Stores Policy required that bids on railway contracts be submitted to the India Office in London, shutting out most Indian firms. The railway companies purchased most of their hardware and parts in Britain. Railway maintenance workshops existed in India, but were rarely allowed to manufacture or repair locomotives. Christensen (1996) looked at colonial purpose, local needs, capital, service and private-versus-public interests. He concluded that making the railways dependent on the state hindered success, because railway expenses had to go through the same bureaucratic budgeting process as did all other state expenses. Railway costs could therefore not respond to needs of the railways or their passengers.

In 1951, forty-two separate railway systems, including thirty-two lines owned by the former Indian princely states, were amalgamated to form a single unit named the Indian Railways. The existing rail systems were abandoned in favor of zones in 1951 and a total of six zones came into being in 1952.

Chemicals

The first refineries were established to produce kerosene, petrol, paints and over chemicals, locally, with production increasing once local deposits had been identified, to by the 1940s, sixty million gallons of petrochemicals were being produced annually.

Economic impact of imperialism

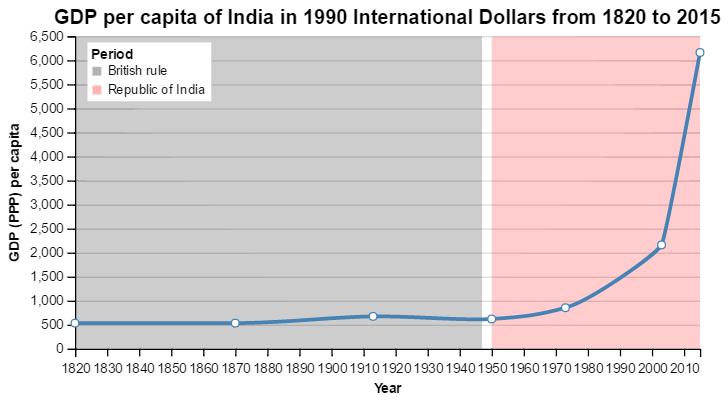
This map shows the change in per capita GDP of India from 1820 CE to 2015 CE. All GDP numbers are inflation adjusted to 1990 International Geary-Khamis dollars. Data Source: Tables of Prof. Angus Maddison (2010). The per capita GDP over various years and population data can be downloaded in a spreadsheet from here. The 2015 estimate is retrieved from the International Monetary Fund.

Debate continues about the economic impact of British rule on India. The issue was first raised by Edmund Burke who in the 1780s vehemently attacked the East India Company, claiming that Warren Hastings and other top officials had ruined the Indian economy and society, and elaborated on in the 19th century by Romesh Chunder Dutt. Indian historian Rajat Kanta Ray argued the economy established by the East India Company in 18th-century Bengal was a form of plunder and a catastrophe for the traditional economy of India, depleting food and money stocks and imposing high taxes that helped cause the Bengal famine of 1770, which killed a third of Bengal's population. Ray also argued British India failed to offer the necessary encouragement, technology transfers, and protectionist frameworks, to permit British India to replicate Britain's own industrialisation, before its independence.

British historian P. J. Marshall reinterpreted the view that the prosperity of the Mughal era gave way to poverty and anarchy, arguing that the British takeover was not a sharp break with the past. British control was delegated largely through regional rulers and was sustained by a generally prosperous economy through the 18th century, except for the frequent, deadly famines. Marshall notes the British raised revenue through local tax administrators and kept the old Mughal tax rates. Instead of the Indian nationalist account of the British as alien aggressors, seising power by brute force and impoverishing the region, Marshall presents a British nationalist interpretation in which the British were not in full control, but instead were controllers in what was primarily an Indian-run society and in which their ability to keep power depended upon cooperation with Indian elites. Marshall admitted that much of his interpretation is rejected by many historians.

Some historians point to company rule as a major factor in both India's deindustrialization and Britain's Industrial Revolution, suggesting capital amassed from Bengal following its 1757 conquest supported investment in British industries such as textile manufacture during the Industrial Revolution as well as increasing British wealth, while contributing to deindustrialization in Bengal.

Other economic historians have blamed the colonial rule for the current dismal state of India's economy, with investment in Indian industries limited since it was a colony. Under British rule, India's a number of native manufacturing industries shrank. The economic policies of the British Raj caused a severe decline in the handicrafts and handloom sectors, with reduced demand and dipping employment; the yarn output of the handloom industry, for example, declined from 419 million pounds in 1850 to 240 million pounds in 1900.

There is no doubt that our grievances against the British Empire had a sound basis. As the painstaking statistical work of the Cambridge historian Angus Maddison has shown, India's share of world income collapsed from 22.6% in 1700, almost equal to Europe's share of 23.3% at that time, to as low as 3.8% in 1952. Indeed, at the beginning of the 20th century, "the brightest jewel in the British Crown" was the poorest country in the world in terms of per capita income.

— Manmohan Singh

Economic historians have investigated regional differences in taxation, and public good provision, across the British Raj, with a strong positive correlation found between education spending, and literacy in India; with historic provincial policies still impacting comparative economic development, productivity, and employment.

Other economic historians debate the impact of Mahatma Gandhi's establishment of the Swadeshi movement, and All India Village Industries Association, in the 1930s, to promote an alternative, self sufficient, indigenous, village economy, approach to development, over the Classical Western economic model; along with the impact of the Nonviolent resistance movement, with the mass boycottIng of industrial goods, tax strikes, and abolition of the salt tax, on public revenues, public programs, growth and industrialisation, in the last quarter of the British Raj.

India served as both a significant supplier of raw goods to British manufacturers and a large captive market for British manufactured goods.

Relative decline in productivity

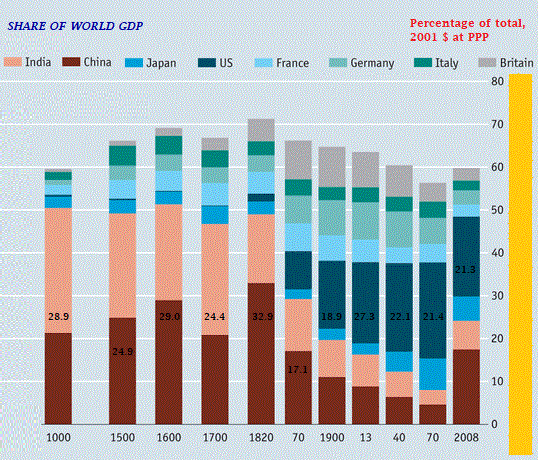
The global contribution to world's GDP by major economies from 1 CE to 2003 CE according to Angus Maddison's estimates. Up until the early 18th century, China and India were the two largest economies by GDP output. (** X axis of graph has non-linear scale which underestimates the dominance of India and China).

India accounted for 25% of the world's industrial output in 1750, declining to 2% of the world's industrial output in 1900. Britain replaced India as the world's largest textile manufacturer in the 19th century. In terms of urbanization, Mughal India had a higher percentage of its population (15%) living in urban centres in 1600 than British India did in the 19th century.

Productivity comparison

Stephen Broadberry, Johann Custodis, and Bishnupriya Gupta, in 2014, offered the following comparative estimates for:

Indian and UK populations and GDP (PPP) per capita, between 1600 and 1871, in terms of 1990 international dollars.
Year	India ($)	UK ($)	Ratio (%)	India population (m)	UK population (m)
1600	682	1,123	61.5	142	5
1650	638	1,100	58.8	142	5.8
1700	622	1,563	40.3	164	8.8
1750	576	1,710	34.2	190	9.2
1801	569	2,080	27.7	207	16.3
1851	556	2,997	18.8	232	27.5
1871	526	3,657	14.5	256	31.6

Several economic historians claimed that in the 18th century real wages were falling in India, and were "far below European levels". This has been disputed by others, who argued that real wage decline occurred in the early 19th century, or possibly beginning in the late 18th century, largely as a result of "globalization forces".

Clingingsmith and Williamson argue India deindustrialised, in the period between 1750 and 1860, due to two very different causes, before reindustrialization. Between 1750 and 1810, they suggest the loss of Mughal hegemony allowed new despotic rulers to revenue farm their conquered populations, seeing tax and rent demands increase to 50% of production, compared to the 5–6% extracted in China during the period, and levied largely to fund regional warfare. Combined with the use of labour and livestock for martial purposes, grain and textile prices were driven up, along with nominal wages, as the populace attempted to meet the demands, reducing the competitiveness of Indian handicrafts, and impacting the regional textile trade. Then from 1810 to 1860, the expansion of the British factory system drove down the relative price of textiles worldwide, through productivity advances, a trend that was magnified in India as the concurrent transport revolution dramatically reduced transportation costs, and in a sub-continent that had not seen metalled roads, the introduction of mechanical transport exposed once protected markets to global competition, hitting artisanal manufacture, but stabilising the agricultural sector.

Angus Maddison states:

This was a shattering blow to manufacturers of fine muslins, jewellery, luxury clothing and footwear, decorative swords and weapons. My own guess would be that the home market for these goods was about 5 percent of Moghul national income and the export market for textiles probably another 1.5 percent.

Absence of industrialisation

Historians have questioned why India failed to industrialise. As the global cotton industry underwent a technological revolution in the 18th century, while Indian industry stagnated after adopting the flying shuttle, and industrialisation began only in the late 19th century. Several historians have suggested that this was because India was still a largely agricultural nation with low commodity money wage levels, arguing that nominal wages were high in Britain so cotton producers had the incentive to invent and purchase expensive new labour-saving technologies, and that wages levels were low in India so producers preferred to increase output by hiring more workers rather than investing in technology.

==== Colonial boom ====
During 1906–50, real GDP per capita of India fell 5.7 per cent while that of the UK grew 45 per cent and the USA grew 111 per cent. British colonial rule created an institutional environment that stabilised Indian society, though they stifled trade with the rest of the world. They created a well-developed system of railways, telegraphs and a modern legal system. Extensive irrigation systems were built, providing an impetus for growing cash crops for export and for raw materials for Indian industry, especially jute, cotton, sugarcane, coffee, rubber, and tea.

In 1928, 48% of the cotton spindles installed outside Europe, North America and Japan were in India (Dunn and Hardy, 1931: 25). In 1935, 50% of the steel produced outside Europe, North America and Japan was produced in India (BKS, 1950: 265–74). The Tata Iron and Steel Company (TISCO), headed by Dorabji Tata, opened its plant at Jamshedpur in Bihar (present-day in Jharkhand) in 1908. It became the leading iron and steel producer in India, with 120,000 employees in 1945. TISCO became India's symbol of technical skill, managerial competence, entrepreneurial flair, and high pay for industrial workers.

During the First World War, the railways were used to transport troops and grains to Bombay and Karachi en route to Britain, Mesopotamia and East Africa. With shipments of equipment and parts from Britain curtailed, maintenance became much more difficult; critical workers entered the army; workshops were converted to make munitions; the locomotives, rolling stock, and track of some entire lines were shipped to the Middle East. The railways could barely keep up with the sudden increase in demand. By the end of the war, the railways had deteriorated badly. In the Second World War the railway workshops were again converted into munitions workshops.

Inflation emerged a national issue during the World Wars with negligible rise in real GDP. Non-royal private wealth was encouraged by colonial administrations during these times. Houses of Birla and Sahu Jain began to challenge the Houses of Martin Burn, Bird Heilgers and Andrew Yule. About one-ninth of the national population were urban by 1925.

Economic bust

The first economic boom cycle ended with the Great Depression in India. The colonial administration did little to alleviate debt stress. The worst consequences involved deflation, which increased the burden of the debt on villagers. Total economic output did not decline between 1929 and 1934. The worst-hit sector was jute, based in Bengal, which was an important element in overseas trade; it had prospered in the 1920s but prices dropped in the 1930s. Employment also decline, while agriculture and small-scale industry exhibited gains. The most successful new industry was sugar, which had meteoric growth in the 1930s.

Gold-Silver ratio quintupled to 100-1 during 1920-40 triggering a sterling crisis worse than the 1890s. The Bank of England records the Indian central bank held a positive balance of £1,160 million on 14 July 1947, and that British India maintained a trade surplus, with the United Kingdom, for the duration of the British Raj eg.

India: Sources of Sterling 1939–1946 (£ million)
Period	Balance of trade and net invisibles	War expenditure	Other sources	Total
September 1939 – March 1940	65	2	13	80
1940–41	57	30	6	93
1941–42	73	146	6	225
1942–43	92	244	7	343
1943–44	105	289	3	397
1944–45	92	308	2	402
1945–46	70	282	3	355
Total	554	1,301	40	1,895

Source: Indian sterling balances, p. 2, 15 Jan.1.1947, Bank of England (BoE), OV56/55.

Studies of the comparative tax burdens in the British Empire, by days of labour required to meet the per capita tax bill, income tax rates, and gross colonial revenues indicate the tax burden in India required approximately half the number of days of labour to meet, as that of the UK, and a third that of some settler colonies, such as New Zealand, Australia, Canada, and Hong Kong, which some economic historians speculate deprived the Colonial Indian administration of the revenue necessary to provide the public goods to accelerate economic development, literacy, and industrialisation, as experienced elsewhere in the empire.

The newly independent but weak Union government's treasury reported annual revenue of £334 million in 1950. In contrast, Nizam Asaf Jah VII of Hyderabad State was widely reported to have a fortune of almost £668 million then. About one-sixth of the national population were urban by 1950. A US Dollar was exchanged at 4.79 rupees.

Karl Marx, writing in 1857, suggested the Nominal (Silver) per capita income of East India Company, in 1854, was approximately 1:12 that of the UK, as was the Nominal per capita tax burden 1:12 of the UK, 1:10 of France, and 1:5 of Prussia. Explaining why the EIC administration was perpetually running local deficits, and in need to borrow monies in India, to fund the administration.

Economic historians such as Prasannan Parthasarathi have criticised these estimates, arguing primary sources show Real (grain) wages in 18th-century Bengal and Mysore were comparable to Britain. According to evidence cited by Immanuel Wallerstein, Irfan Habib, Percival Spear and Ashok Desai, per-capita agricultural output and standards of consumption in 17th-century Mughal India was higher than in 17th-century Europe and early 20th-century British India. Sivramkrishna analysed agricultural surveys conducted in Mysore by Francis Buchanan in 1800–1801, arrived at estimates, using "subsistence basket", that aggregated millet income could be almost five times subsistence level, while corresponding rice income is three times that much. That could be comparable to advance part of Europe. However, due to the scarcity of data, more research is needed, before drawing any conclusion. Shireen Moosvi estimates that Mughal India had a per-capita income 1.24% higher in the late 16th century than British India had in the early 20th century, although the difference would be less if increasing purchasing power in terms of manufactured goods were taken into account. She also estimates that the secondary sector contributed a higher percentage to the Mughal economy (18.2%) than it did to the economy of early 20th-century British India (11.2%).

According to economic historian Paul Bairoch, India as well as China had a higher GDP (PPP) per capita than Europe in 1750. For 1750, Bairoch estimated the GNP per capita for the Western world to be $182 in 1960 US dollars ($804 in 1990 dollars) and for the non-Western world to be $188 in 1960 dollars ($830 in 1990 dollars), exceeded by both China and India. Other estimates he gives include $150–190 for England in 1700 and $160–210 for India in 1800. Bairoch estimated that it was only after 1800 that Western European per-capita income pulled ahead. Others such as Andre Gunder Frank, Robert A. Denemark, Kenneth Pomeranz and Amiya Kumar Bagchi also criticised estimates that showed low per-capita income and GDP growth rates in Asia (especially China and India) prior to the 19th century, pointing to later research that found significantly higher per-capita income and growth rates in China and India during that period.

== Republic of India ==
=== Socialist period ===
Before independence a large share of tax revenue was generated by the land tax. Thereafter land taxes steadily declined as a share of revenues.

The economic problems inherited at independence were exacerbated by the costs associated with the partition, which had resulted in about 2 to 4 million refugees fleeing past each other across the new borders between India and Pakistan. Refugee settlement was a considerable economic strain. Partition divided India into complementary economic zones. Under the British, jute and cotton were grown in the eastern part of Bengal (East Pakistan, after 1971, Bangladesh), but processing took place mostly in the western part of Bengal, which became the Indian state of West Bengal. As a result, after independence India had to convert land previously used for food production to cultivate cotton and jute.

Growth continued in the 1950s, the rate of growth was less positive than India's politicians expected.

Toward the end of Nehru's term as prime minister, India experienced serious food shortages.

Beginning in 1950, India faced trade deficits that increased in the 1960s. The Government of India had a major budget deficit and therefore could not borrow money internationally or privately. As a result, the government issued bonds to the Reserve Bank of India, which increased the money supply, leading to inflation. The Indo-Pakistani War of 1965 led the US and other countries friendly towards Pakistan to withdraw foreign aid to India, which necessitated devaluation. India was told it had to liberalise trade before aid would resume. The response was the politically unpopular step of devaluation accompanied by liberalisation. Defence spending in 1965/1966 was 24.06% of expenditure, the highest in the period from 1965 to 1989. Exacerbated by the drought of 1965/1966, the devaluation was severe. GDP per capita grew 33% in the 1960s, reaching a peak growth of 142% in the 1970s, before decelerating to 41% in the 1980s and 20% in the 1990s.

From FY 1951 to FY 1979, the economy grew at an average rate of about 3.1 percent a year, or at an annual rate of 1.0 percent per capita. During this period, industry grew at an average rate of 4.5 per cent a year, compared with 3 per cent for agriculture. Real GDP per capita grew 59 per cent during 1950–77.

Prime minister Indira Gandhi proclaimed a national emergency and suspended the Constitution in 1975. About one-fifth of the national population were urban by 1975.

Steel

Prime Minister Nehru was a believer in socialism and decided that India needed maximum steel production. He, therefore, formed a government-owned company, Hindustan Steel Limited (HSL) and set up three steel plants in the 1950s.

Heavy Industry

India maintained close ties to the Soviet Union, which provided technology assistance and transfer in the field of heavy industries such as oil, gas, mining, machinery, railways, heavy equipment, and electrical equipment.

Economic bust

The second economic boom cycle ended with the 1979 oil crisis that triggered fiscal deficits through the 1980s. In 1975 India's GDP (in 1990 US dollars) was $545 billion, $1,561 billion in the USSR, $1,266 billion in Japan, and $3,517 billion in the US. Real GDP per capita grew 51 per cent during 1977–94.

=== Capitalist boom ===
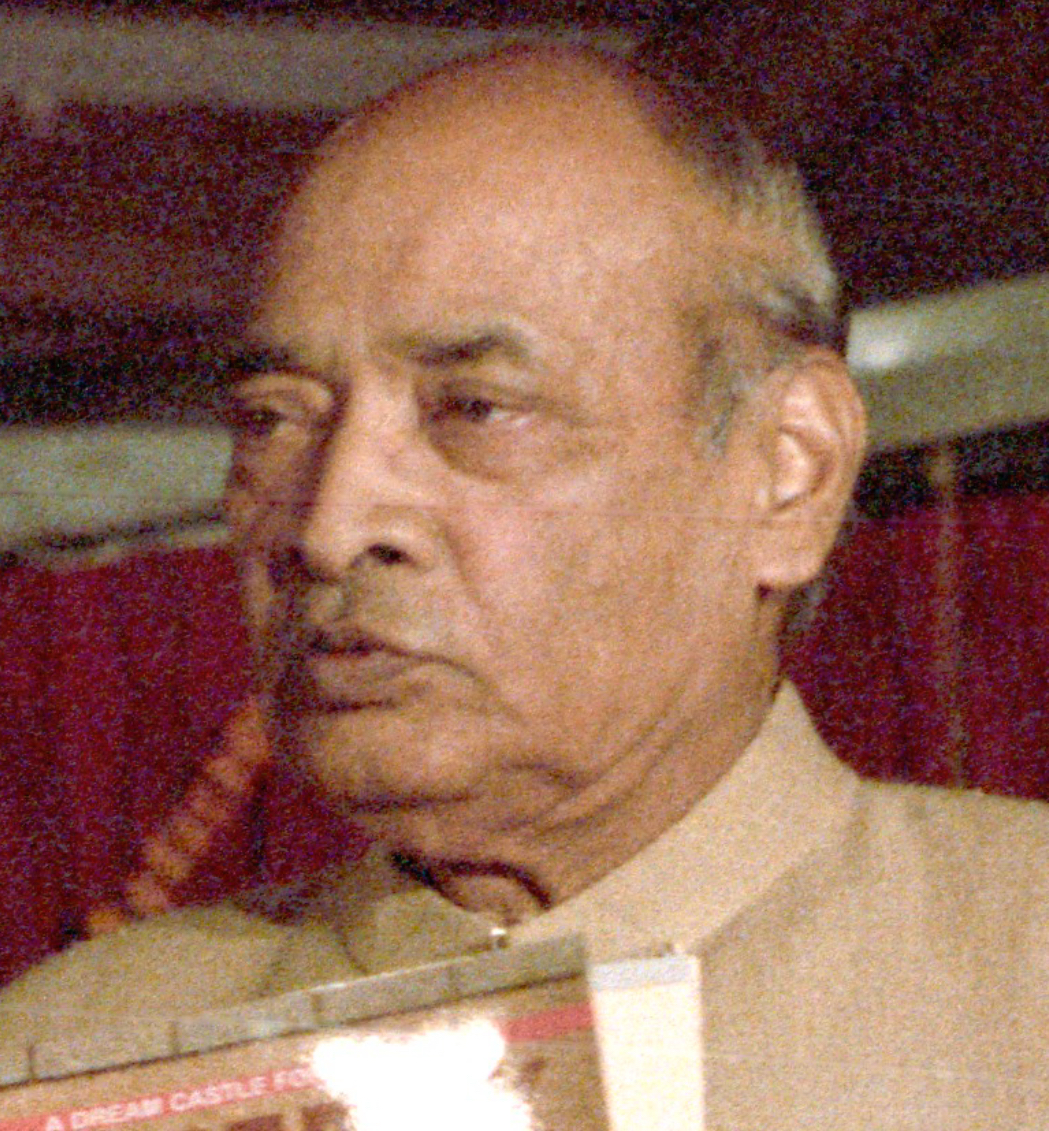
P. V. Narasimha Rao

Economic liberalisation in India was initiated in 1991 by Prime Minister P. V. Narasimha Rao and his then-Finance Minister Dr. Manmohan Singh.

Economic liberalisation in India since the 1990s led to paradigm shift in growth and structure of national income. Real GDP per capita grew 142 per cent during 1994–2013.

About one-fourth of the national population was urban by 2000.

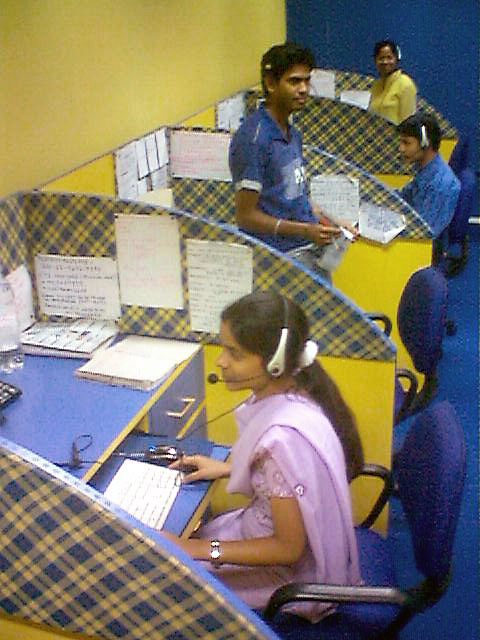
Service markets which would enjoy much lighter burden of regulation and other obstacles became more successful than still regulated sectors. For example, world-famous business process services are very lightly regulated.

The Indian steel industry began expanding into Europe in the 21st century. In January 2007 India's Tata bought European steel maker Corus Group for $11.3 billion. In 2006, Mittal Steel Company (based in London but with Indian management) acquired Arcelor to form ArcelorMittal, with 10% of world output.

The government started the Golden Quadrilateral road network connecting Delhi, Chennai, Mumbai and Kolkata with various Indian regions. The project, completed in January 2012, was the most ambitious infrastructure project of independent India.

In the early 21st century, successive Indian governments also began to bridge the electrical divide that had opened between urban centres and the countryside over the course of the 20th century.

In 2005, the Singh Administration launched a rural electrification drive, the Rajiv Gandhi Grameen Vidyutikaran Yojana or the Rural Electricity Infrastructure and Household Electrification Scheme. This was followed by the Saubhagya scheme, launched by the incoming Modi Government in 2017 in the aim of extending electrification to the most remote villages in the country. As a consequence of these initiatives, relatively few households in India lacked access to electricity by the 2020s.

Efforts to modernise the Indian Economy by successive Indian Administrations in the early 21st century flowed through to higher income growth. Real GDP per capita grew 39% during 2013–2021.

Economic bust

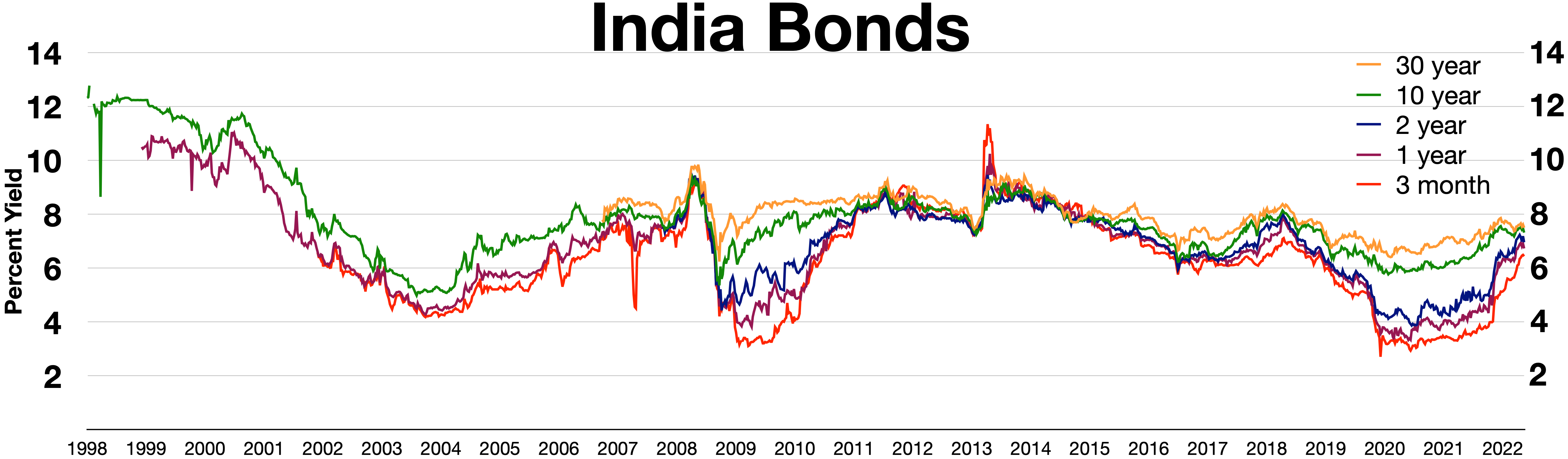
India bonds 30 year 10 year 2 year 1 year 3 month

The Indian boom years of the 2000s and early 2010s were brought to a halt by the real estate crisis in 2012-13.

For purchasing power parity comparisons, the US dollar is converted at 9.46 rupees.

Despite continuous real GDP growth of at least 6.5% since 2009, the Indian economy remained mired in bureaucratic hurdles.

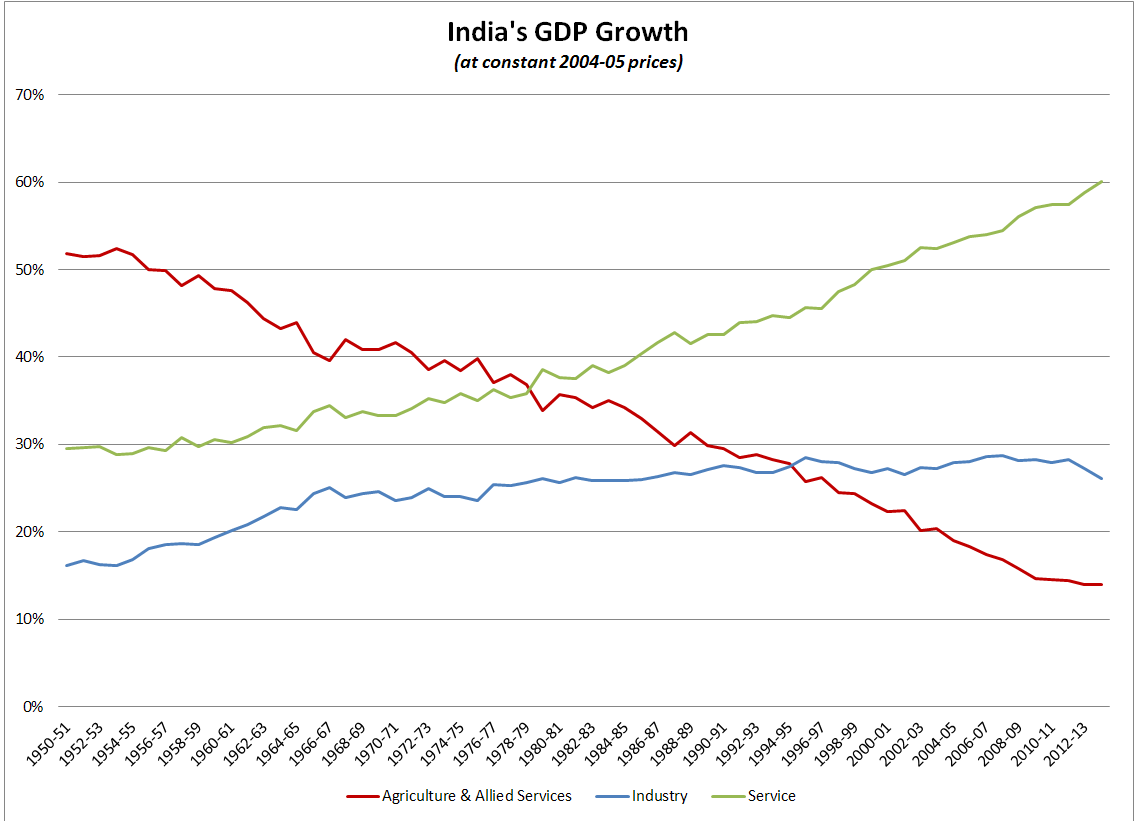
India GDP Growth (at constant 2004–05 price)

== See also ==
- Golden Age of India
- Demographics of India
- GDP of India (1–1947 CE)
- History of agriculture in the Indian subcontinent
- Banking in India
- History of India
- Indian maritime history
- List of regions by past GDP (PPP)
- List of regions by past GDP (PPP) per capita
- List of countries by past and projected GDP (nominal)
- Economic history of the Indian subcontinent

== Bibliography ==
=== Pre 1947 ===
- Anstey, Vera. The economic development of India (4th ed. 1952), 677pp; thorough scholarly coverage; focus on 20th century down to 1939
- Bowen, H. V. Business of Empire: The East India Company and Imperial Britain, 1756–1833 (2006), 304pp
- Balachandran, G., ed. India and the World Economy, 1850–1950 Oxford University Press, 2005. ISBN 0-19-567234-8.
- Blyn, George. Agricultural trends in India, 1891-1947: output, availability, and productivity (U of Pennsylvania Press, 2016).
- Broadberry, Stephen, Johann Custodis, and Bishnupriya Gupta. "India and the great divergence: An Anglo-Indian comparison of GDP per capita, 1600–1871." Explorations in Economic History 55#1 (2015): 58–75. online
- Chandavarkar, Rajnarayan. The Origins of Industrial Capitalism in India: Business strategies and the working classes in Bombay, 1900-1940 (Cambridge University Press, 2002) online.
- Chattopadhyaya, D. P., & Chaudhuri, B. B. (2005). Economic history of India from eighteenth to twentieth century. (New Delhi: Centre for Studies in Civilizations.)
- Chaudhuri, K. N. Trade and Civilization in the Indian Ocean: An Economic History from the Rise of Islam to 1750 (1985)
- Derbyshire, I. D. (1987), "Economic Change and the Railways in North India, 1860–1914", Population Studies, 21 (3): 521–45, doi:10.1017/s0026749x00009197, JSTOR 312641, S2CID 146480332
- Deyell, John S. 2019. "Indian Kingdoms 1200–1500 and the Maritime Trade in Monetary Commodities". in Currencies of the Indian Ocean World, 49–69. Springer.
- Donaldson, Dave. "Railroads of the Raj: Estimating the impact of transportation infrastructure." American Economic Review 108.4-5 (2018): 899–934. online
- Dutt, Romesh C. The Economic History of India under early British Rule, first published 1902, 2001 edition by Routledge, ISBN 978-0-415-24493-0
- Farnie, DA (1979), The English Cotton Industry and the World Market, 1815–1896, Oxford, UK: Oxford University Press. Pp. 414, ISBN 978-0-19-822478-5
- Ludden, David, ed. New Cambridge History of India: An Agrarian History of South Asia (1999).
- Habib, Irfan (2011). Economic History of Medieval India, 1200-1500. Pearson Education India. ISBN 978-81-317-2791-1.
- Habib, Irfan; Kumar, Dharma; Raychaudhuri, Tapan, eds. (1987). The Cambridge Economic History of India (PDF). Vol. 1. Cambridge University Press. p. 171.
- Habib, Irfan. Agrarian System of Mughal India (1963, revised edition 1999).
- Habib, Irfan. Indian Economy, 1858–1914 (2006).
- Kumar, Dharma, ed. (2005). The Cambridge Economic History of India. Cambridge University Press. ISBN 978-81-250-2731-7.
- Kumar, Prakash. Indigo Plantations and Science in Colonial India (Cambridge University Press, 2012) 334 pp
- Lal, Deepak. The Hindu Equilibrium: India c. 1500 B.C.–2000 A.D. (2nd ed. 2005).
- Lal, K. S. (1995). Growth of scheduled tribes and castes in medieval India. New Delhi: Aditya Prakashan.
- Lal, K. S. (1999). Theory and practice of Muslim state in India. New Delhi: Aditya Prakashan.
- Lockwood, David. The Indian Bourgeoisie: A Political History of the Indian Capitalist Class in the Early Twentieth Century (I.B. Tauris, 2012).
- Majumdar, R. C. (2010). Corporate life in ancient India. Charleston, SC: Bibliolife.
- Mahajan, Nupam P. (1999) India's First Coinage. Retrieved 24 February 2005.
- Micklethwait, John & Wooldridge, Adrian (2003). The Company: a short history of a revolutionary idea. Modern library chronicles. ISBN 0-679-64249-8.
- Peers, Douglas M. (2006), India under Colonial Rule 1700–1885, Harlow and London: Pearson Longmans. Pp. xvi, 163, ISBN 978-0582317383.
- Sarkar, Jadunath, Economics of British India, Kolkata: Sarkar.
- Raychaudhuri, Tapan and Irfan Habib, eds. The Cambridge Economic History of India: Volume 1, c. 1200–c. 1750 (1982).
- Raychaudhuri, Tapan; Habib, Irfan (2004). The Cambridge Economic History of India, Volume I : c. 1200 – c. 1750. New Delhi: Orient Longman. p. 543. ISBN 978-81-250-2709-6.
- Roy, Tirthankar. The Economic History of India 1857–1947 (2002, 2006, 2011).
- Roy, Tirthankar. India in the World Economy from Antiquity to the Present (2012).
- Roy, Tirthankar (Summer 2002), "Economic History and Modern India: Redefining the Link", The Journal of Economic Perspectives, 16 (3): 109–30, doi:10.1257/089533002760278749, JSTOR 3216953
- Simmons, Colin (1985), "'De-Industrialization', Industrialization and the Indian Economy, c. 1850–1947", Modern Asian Studies, 19 (3): 593–622, doi:10.1017/s0026749x00007745, JSTOR 312453, S2CID 144581168
- Tomlinson, B. R. The Economy of Modern India, 1860–1970 (The New Cambridge History of India) (1996) excerpt and text search
- Tomlinson, B. H. "India and the British Empire, 1880–1935", Indian Economic and Social History Review, (October 1975), 12#4 pp. 337–80
- Washbrook, David A. "Law, state and agrarian society in colonial India." Modern Asian Studies 15.3 (1981): 649–721.
- Max Weber, The Religion of India: The Sociology of Hinduism and Buddhism
- Yazdani, Kaveh. India, Modernity and the Great Divergence: Mysore and Gujarat (17th to 19th C.) (Leiden: Brill), 2017. xxxi + 669 pp. online review
- Roy, Kaushik (2012). Hinduism and the Ethics of Warfare in South Asia: From Antiquity to the Present. Cambridge: Cambridge University Press. ISBN 978-1-107-01736-8.

==== Gazetteers and statistics ====
- The Imperial Gazetteer of India (26 vol, 1908–31), highly detailed description of all of India in 1901. online edition
- East India (statistical Abstract).: Statistical Abstract Relating to British India. H.M. Stationery Office. 1906.

=== Since 1947 ===
- Bardhan, Pranab. Awakening Giants, Feet of Clay: Assessing the Economic Rise of China and India by (Princeton University Press; 2010) 172 pages;
- Datt, Ruddar & Sundharam, K.P.M. (1965). Indian Economy (51st Revised ed. (2005)). S.Chand. ISBN 81-219-0298-3.
- Das, Gurcharan. India Unbound: The Social and Economic Revolution from Independence to the Global Information Age (2002).
- Datt, Ruddar; Sundharam, K.P.M. (2009). Indian Economy. New Delhi: S. Chand Group. ISBN 978-81-219-0298-4.
- Kumar, Dharma; Desai, Meghnad, eds. (1983). The Cambridge Economic History of India: c. 1751–c. 1970. Vol. 2.
- Frankel, Francine R. India's Political Economy, 1947–1977: The Gradual Revolution (1978).
- Lal, Deepak. The Hindu Equilibrium: India c. 1500 B.C.-2000 A.D. (2nd ed. 2005).
- Larue, C. Steven. The India Handbook (1997) (Regional Handbooks of Economic Development).
- Maddison, Angus (2006). The World Economy, Volumes 1–2. OECD Publishing. doi:10.1787/456125276116. ISBN 978-92-64-02261-4.
- Maddison, Angus (25 September 2003). Development Centre Studies The World Economy Historical Statistics: Historical Statistics. OECD Publishing. ISBN 978-92-64-10414-3.
- Majumdar, Sumit K. India's Late, Late Industrial Revolution: Democratizing Entrepreneurship (Cambridge University Press; 2012), 426 pages; focus on the entrepreneur-led revolution since 1990
- Myrdal, Gunnar. Asian Drama: An Inquiry into the Poverty of Nations (3 vol, 1968) 2284 pages; also 4th vol. on methodology (1970), focus on India and neighbors; by winner of Nobel prize in economics
- Robb, Peter (17 January 2004). A History of India. Palgrave Macmillan. ISBN 978-0-333-69129-8.
- Richards, John F. (1996). The Mughal Empire. Cambridge: Cambridge University Press. ISBN 978-0-521-56603-2.
- Richards, John F. (15 May 2003). The Unending Frontier: An Environmental History of the Early Modern World. University of California Press. ISBN 978-0-520-93935-6.
- Roy, Tirthankar. Economic History of India 1857–1947 (3d ed., 2011).
- Rudolph, Lloyd I. In Pursuit of Lakshmi: The Political Economy of the Indian State (1987).
- Sankaran, S. Indian Economy: Problems, Policies and Development (Margham Publications, 7th ed. 1994).
- Tomlinson, B. R. et al. The Economy of Modern India, 1860–1970 (1996) (The New Cambridge History of India)
- Ravinder Kaur (2012). "India Inc. and its Moral Discontent". Economic and Political Weekly.
- Wolpert, Stanley, ed. Encyclopedia of India (4 vol. 2005) comprehensive coverage by scholars
