= Economic history of the Indian subcontinent =

Aspect of the economic history of India

This article documents the economic history of the Indian subcontinent. It includes the economic timeline of the region, from the ancient era to the present, and briefly summarizes the data presented in the Economic history of India and List of regions by past GDP (PPP) articles.

== Antiquity ==
- 500 BC
  - Silver punch-marked coins were minted as currency belonging to a period of intensive trade activity and urban development by the Mahājanapadas.
- 4th century AD
  - Indian subcontinent under the Gupta Empire unified much of the region, contained 33.21% of the world’s population, contributed to around 33 to 35% of world's GDP, and generated an estimated average of $450 (1990 dollars) PPP per annum.

== Middle Ages ==
- 1000
  - Indian subcontinent (led by the Chola, Western Chalukya and Pala empires) contained an estimated 28.05% of the world's population and contributed to around 30 to 33% of world's GDP. Individually generated an estimated average of $450 (1990 dollars) PPP per annum, and collectively produced $33,750 million.
- 1500
  - Indian subcontinent (under the Delhi Sultanate, Vijayanagara Empire, Deccan sultanate, Gajapati Empire, Bengal Sultanate and Rajput kingdoms) contained an estimated 25.09% of the world's population, and who individually generated an estimated average of $550 (1990 dollars) PPP per annum, and collectively produced $60,500 million, of the world's $248,321 million (24.36%), second only to Ming China in regional share.

== Mughal era ==
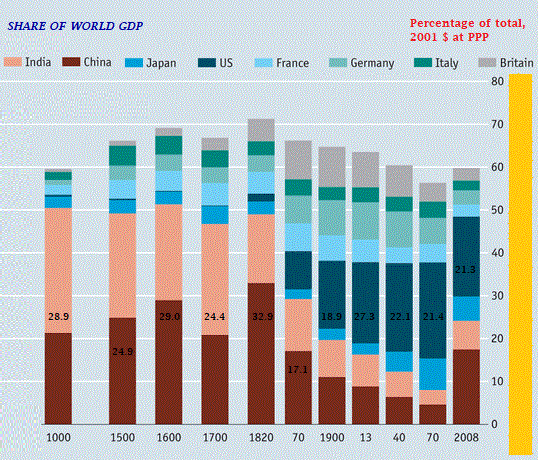
Maddison's estimates of global GDP, China and India being the most powerful until the 18th century. Bengal Subah was valued 50% of Mughal India's GDP.

- 1500–1600
  - Indian subcontinent, mostly under the Mughal Empire (after the conquest of the Delhi Sultanate and Bengal Sultanate) became economically 10 times more powerful than the contemporary Kingdom of France, contained an estimated 24.27% of the world's population, and who individually generated an estimated average of $550 (1990 dollars) PPP per annum, and collectively produced $4,250 million, of the world's $31,344 million (4.41%).
- 1600–1700
  - The Indian subcontinent, under Mughal Emperor's Aurangzeb becomes the world's largest economy (after the economic downfall by the transition from Ming to Qing) and the most important center of manufacturing in international trade, ahead of Qing China. Worth 25% of the world's industrial output, it signalled the Proto-industrialization.
- 1700–1800
  - Large parts of the Indian subcontinent, including Bengal Subah, which accounted for 36% of Dutch imports, and Kingdom of Mysore, had some of the world's highest real wages and living standards, made direct essential contributions to the first Industrial Revolution in Britain.

== Colonial period ==
=== East India Company ===
- 1793
  - Cornwallis' Permanent Settlement Instituted in Bengal.
- 1820
  - Qing China was the world's largest economy followed by the UK and India. The Industrial Revolution in the UK catapulted the nation to the top league of Europe for the first time ever. During this period, British foreign and economic policies began treating India as an unequal partner for the first time.
- 1850
  - The gross domestic product of India in 1850 dropped to 5–10% and was estimated at about 40 per cent that of China. British cotton exports reach 30 per cent of the Indian market by 1850.

=== British Raj ===
- 1868
  - First estimation of India's national income by Dadabhai Naoroji.
- 1870
  - India's economy had a 9.2% share of world income under the British Empire.
- 1900
  - Under the British Empire, India's share of manufacturing declined to 2% of global industrial output.
- 1913
  - India's economy had a 5.4% share of world income under the British Empire.
- 1930
  - Indian subcontinent contained an estimated 336.4 of the world's 2,070 million people (16.25%), and who individually generated an estimated average of $726 (1990 dollars) per annum, and collectively produced $244,097 million, of the world's $3,800,000 million (6.42%).

== Post-Independence period ==
=== Just after Independence ===
- 1952
  - India's economy had a 3.8% share of world income.
- 1973
  - India's economy was $494.8 billion, which accounted for a 3.1% share of world income.

=== 1980–1991 ===
Economically closed.

=== 1991–present ===
- 1991
  - Economic liberalisation was initiated by Indian prime minister P. V. Narasimha Rao and his finance minister Manmohan Singh in response to a macroeconomic crisis.
- 1996
  - Beginning of short-lived coalition govts. India's economy is $1.560 trillion (purchasing power parity) accounting for a 3.9% share of world GDP, the fifth largest in the world.
- 2004
  - First NDA govt ends, inflation is 3.8%. India's economy is $2.870 trillion (purchasing power parity) accounting for a 4.7% share of world GDP, the fourth largest.
- 2010
  - India's economy is $4.002 trillion (purchasing power parity) which accounts for a 4.5% share of world income, the fourth largest in the world in terms of real GDP (PPP).
- 2012
  - Second half of UPA-2 and Inflation 10%. India's economy is $4.825 trillion (purchasing power parity), the third largest in the world in terms of real GDP (PPP).
- 2014
  - India's economy is $7.376 trillion (purchasing power parity), the third largest in the world in terms of real GDP (PPP).
- 2017
  - NDA-2 and inflation is 3.8%. India's economy is $9.448 trillion (purchasing power parity) and accounts for a 6.8% share of world GDP (PPP).
- 2021
  - As of 2021, India's economy is $10.207 trillion (purchasing power parity) and accounts for a 7.19% share of world GDP (PPP).

== See also ==
- Economy of South Asia
- List of regions by past GDP (PPP)
