= Bishnupriya Gupta =

Indian economist

Academic background
- Education: University of Calcutta (M.A.); Jawaharlal Nehru University (M.Phil.); Oxford University (D.Phil.)

Academic work
- Discipline: Economics
- Sub-discipline: Development economics, Economic history
- Institutions: London School of Economics; University of Warwick

Bishnupriya Gupta is an Indian economist, academic and author. She is a professor at the Department of Economics, University of Warwick in Coventry, England and the research director of Centre for Competitive Advantage in the Global Economy (CAGE) funded by Economic and Social Research Council (ESRC). Her areas of interest include development economics and economic history with a focus on industrial organisation in colonial India, gender bias and sex ratio in twentieth century India, and the great divergence between Europe and Asia.

== Biography ==
Gupta received a Master of Arts (MA) in economics from University of Calcutta and a Master of Philosophy (MPhil) in economic history from Jawaharlal Nehru University (JNU) in 1979 and 1982 respectively. She was awarded a Doctorate of Philosophy (DPhil) in economic history from St Anthony's College, Oxford University in 1989.

Between 1990 and 1994, Gupta worked at the Indian Council for Research on International Economic Relations (ICRIER) and the Delhi School of Economics. She joined the Department of Economics, University of St. Andrews as a teaching and research fellow in 1995. For two years, starting 1999, she served as a lecturer at Department of Economic History, London School of Economics. From 2001 to 2015, Gupta was an associate professor at Department of Economics, University of Warwick.

In 2019, Gupta and her co-authors Stephen Broadberry, Jean-Pascal Bassino, Kyoji Fukao, and Masanori Takashima were awarded the Larry Neal Prize for the best article published in Explorations in Economic History during 2018/19 for their paper "Japan and the Great Divergence, 730-1874". In the paper, the quintet argues that Japan experienced positive trend growth between 730 and 1874, unlike China and India, but remained behind northwest Europe due to its slower growth rate.

Gupta was appointed as the co-editor of The Journal of Economic History in July 2022. In 2023, she was elected as a Fellow of the Academy of Social Sciences.

In February 2025, Cambridge University Press published An Economic History of India: Growth, Income and Inequalities from the Mughals to the 21st Century in which Gupta proposes a new framework, using concepts and theories from economics and economic history, to better understand the economic impacts of British colonial rule in India. She examines the country's transition from precolonial- to post-independence economy, shedding light on the prevailing impacts of historical institutions on economic performance. Kaushik Basu, Professor of Economics at Cornell University, praised Gupta for casting aside the persisting biases commonly observed across colonialism-related research and presenting a "masterly study" of India's economic history. Referring to Gupta as "one of the leading academic experts on India's economic history," Lakshmi Iyer, Professor of Economics and Global Affairs at University of Notre Dame deemed the book "a must-read for anyone who has ever wondered whether British colonialism led to India's de-industrialization, whether independence made a difference to economic progress, and how much of India's post-colonial economic progress or stagnation can be attributed to its historical circumstances."

== Politics ==
Gupta was one of the seventy five Indian academics who opposed Narendra Modi's candidacy for Prime Minister in an open letter ahead of the 2014 Indian general election. The intelligentsia warned that his victory would "likely mean greater moral policing, especially of women, increased censorship and vigilantism, and more tensions with India's neighbours." In 2016, Gupta joined more than four hundred academics and intellectuals globally who released a statement opposing the "illegal" police action against JNU students on the basis of their political beliefs and the arrest of Kanhaiya Kumar, president of the JNU Students Union. The statement affirmed the "autonomy of the university as a non-militarized space for freedom of thought and expression," urging the JNU vice chancellor to safeguard the rights of students, faculty, and the staff.

== Selected publications ==
=== Books ===
- Gupta, Bishnupriya (2025). "An Economic History of India: Growth, Income and Inequalities from the Mughals to the 21st Century". Cambridge: Cambridge University Press. ISBN 978-1-108-86906-5.
- Gupta, Bishnupriya; Chaudhary, Latika; Swamy Anand; Roy, Tirthankar (2015). "A New Economic History of Colonial India". London: Routledge. ISBN 978-1-317-67433-7.

=== Book chapters ===
- Gupta, Bishnupriya; Roy, Tirthankar (2017). "Chapter 10: From Artisanal Production to Machine Tools: Industrialization in India over the Long Run". In O'Rourke, Kevin; Williamson, Jefferey (eds.). The Spread of Modern Industry to the Periphery since 1871. Oxford, United Kingdom: Oxford University Press. pp. 229–55. doi:10.1093/acprof:oso/9780198753643.003.0010 ISBN 978-0-19-875364-3.
- Gupta, Bishnupriya (2021). "Chapter 6: From free Trade to Regulation: The Political Economy of India's Development". In Broadberry, Stephen and Fukao, Kyoji (eds.). The Cambridge Economic History of the Modern World. Cambridge: Cambridge University Press. pp. 151–75. ISBN 978-1-107-15948-8.
- Gupta, Bishnupriya (2018). "South Asia in the World Economy: 1600-1950". In Riello, Giorgio and Roy, Tirthankar (eds.). Global Economic History. London: Bloomsbury Academic. pp. 429–46. ISBN 978-1-4725-8842-5, 9781472588425, 1472588436, 9781472588432.
- Gupta, Bishnupriya; Roy, Tirthankar; Ma, Debin (2016). "Part 1: States and Development: Early Modern India, China and Great Divergence". In Eloranta, Jari; Golson, Eric; Markewich, Andrei; Wolf, Nikolaus (eds.). Economic History of Warfare and State Formation. Springer. pp. 51–67. ISBN 978-981-10-1604-2.
- Gupta, Bishnupriya; Broadberry, Stephen (2015). "Chapter 2: Indian economic performance and living standards: 1600-2000". In Chaudhary, Latika, Gupta, Bishnupriya, Roy, Tirthankar and A. Swamy (eds.). A New Economic History of Colonial India. London: Routledge. pp. 15–32. doi:10.4324/9781315771083-2 ISBN 978-0-367-23637-3.
- Gupta, Bishnupriya (2011). "Part 1: India's Growth in a Long Run Perspective". In Jha, Raghbendra (ed.). Handbook of South Asian Economics. Abingdon, Oxon; New York: Routledge. doi:10.4324/9780203827796 ISBN 978-0-203-82779-6.
- Gupta, Bishnupriya; Ma, Debin (2010). "Europe in an Asian Mirror: The Great Divergence". In Broadberry, Stephen and O'Rourke, Kevin (eds.). The Cambridge Economic History of Modern Europe, Volume 1:1700-1870. Cambridge: Cambridge University Press. ISBN 978-0-521-70838-8, 978-0521708388.
- Gupta, Bishnupriya (1993). "Trade Liberalization and Changes in the Protection of Indian Industry". In Gupta, Swaraj (ed.). Economic Liberalization in India and its Impact. New Delhi: Macmillan. pp. 166–81.

=== Journal articles ===
- Fenske, James; Gupta, Bishnupriya; Neumann, Cora (2025). "Missing Women in Colonial India". Economic History Review. doi:10.1111/ehr.13413 ISSN 0013-0117.
- Fenske, James; Gupta, Bishnupriya; Yuan, Song (2022). "Demographic Shocks and Women’s Labor Market Participation: Evidence from the 1918 Influenza Pandemic in India". The Journal of Economic History, 82(3), 875–912. doi:10.1017/S0022050722000304 ISSN 0022-0507
- Gupta, Bishnupriya; Mookherjee, Dilip; Munshi, Kaivan; Sanclemente, Mario (2022). "Community Origins of Industrial Entrepreneurship in Colonial India." Journal of Development Economics, Elsevier, vol. 159(C). doi:10.1016/j.jdeveco.2022.102973 ISSN 0083-7350.
- Gupta, Bishnupriya (2019). "Falling Behind and Catching up: India’s Transition from a Colonial Economy". Economic History Review, 72 (3). pp. 803–827. doi:10.1111/ehr.12849 ISSN 0013-0117.
- Bassino, Jean-Pascal; Broadberry, Stephen; Fukao, Kyoji; Gupta, Bishnupriya; Takashima, Masanori (2019). "Japan and the great divergence, 730–1874". Explorations in Economic History, 72. pp. 1–22. doi:10.1016/j.eeh.2018.11.005 ISSN 0014-4983.
- Broadberry, Stephen; Custodis, Johann; Gupta, Bishnupriya (2015). "India and the Great Divergence : An Anglo-Indian Comparison of GDP per capita, 1600–1871". Explorations in Economic History, 55. pp. 58–75. doi:10.1016/j.eeh.2014.04.003 ISSN 0014-4983.
- Gupta, Bishnupriya (2014). "Discrimination or Social Networks? Industrial Investment in Colonial India". The Journal of Economic History, 74 (1). pp. 141–168. doi:10.1017/S0022050714000059 ISSN 0022-0507.
- Gupta, Bishnupriya (2014). "Where Have all the Brides Gone? Son Preference and Marriage in India over the Twentieth Century". The Economic History Review, 67 (1). pp. 1–24. doi:10.1111/1468-0289.12011 ISSN 0013-0117.
