= 1991 Indian economic crisis =

Balance-of-payments crisis in India

The 1991 Indian economic crisis was a balance-of-payments crisis in which India's foreign-exchange reserves fell to a level barely sufficient to pay three weeks of imports. It followed a decade of large fiscal deficits and rising external borrowing and came to a head in 1990-91 because of rising oil prices during the Gulf War, political instability that prevented the government from passing the budget, and a loss of investor confidence. India avoided default by borrowing from the International Monetary Fund and by pledging part of its gold reserves as collateral for loans from foreign banks. In June 1991, the rupee depreciated sharply due to low foreign exchange reserves, further worsening the twin deficit problem.

The crisis led the government of P.V. Narasimha Rao, with Manmohan Singh as finance minister, to begin a programme of economic liberalisation in July 1991: the rupee was devalued by about 18%, industrial licensing was largely dismantled, import licensing was reduced, and more industries were opened to foreign investment. How far the reforms were shaped by conditions attached to IMF and World Bank lending, rather than by the government's own choice, is disputed. Growth after 1991 was faster and more sustained than in earlier decades, and extreme poverty fell significantly over the following three decades, although economists disagree on the impact of 1991 reforms, with some crediting reforms in the 1980s.

== Background and causes ==
From the 1950s until 1991, Indian economic policy combined import substitution, a large state-owned sector and an extensive system of Industrial and import licensing, often called the Licence Raj. Growth averaged about 3.6% a year between 1951 and 1974, a rate known as the "Hindu rate of growth". It rose to 5.6% a year between 1981 and 1991. Economists differ on why growth rose in the 1980s. Arvind Panagariya credits partial liberalisation during the decade, but argues that the growth it produced was "fragile and unsustainable". Dani Rodrik and Arvind Subramanian attribute the productivity surge that began around 1980 to a "pro-business" shift in government attitudes, not to market liberalisation.

=== Fiscal deficits and external debt ===
India's economic problems worsened in 1985 as imports swelled, leaving the country in a double deficit: the Indian trade balance ran a deficit while the government ran a substantial fiscal deficit. Combined central and state government spending rose from an average of 18.6% of GDP in the first half of the 1980s to 23% in the second half, and the combined fiscal deficit rose from about 8% to 10.1% of GDP. External debt rose from $20.6 billion in 1980–81 to $64.4 billion in 1989-90. An IMF study by Valeria Cerra and Sweta Saxena found that real overvaluation of the rupee, current-account deficits and investor confidence all played significant roles in the crisis.

=== External shocks, 1990-91 ===
The fall of the Eastern Bloc, which had trade relations with India and allowed for rupee exchange, posed significant issues. The Soviet Union was India's largest trading partner until 1991, with annual bilateral trade of over US$5 billion; turmoil in the USSR triggered a collapse in India's exports. The Gulf War drove up India's oil import bill, exports slumped, credit dried up, and investors pulled out.

=== Political instability and credit downgrades ===
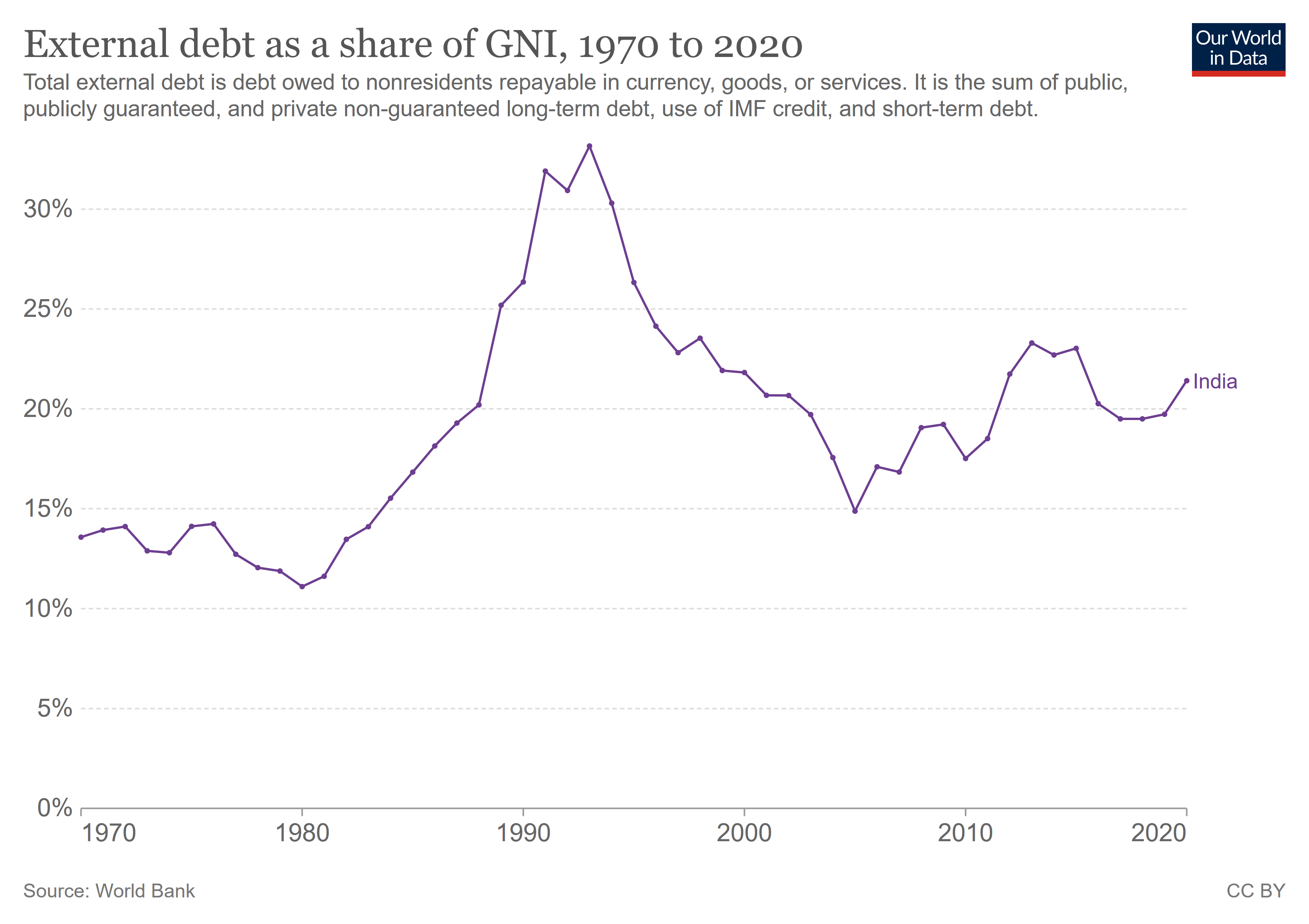
External debt of India (1970–2020)

In February 1991, the Chandra Shekhar ministry could not pass the budget after Moody's downgraded India's bond ratings. The downgrade made it more expensive for India to borrow from international capital markets, placing additional pressure on the economy.

In mid-1991, India's exchange rate was subjected to a severe adjustment. This event began with a slide in the value of the Indian rupee leading up to mid-1991. The authorities at the Reserve Bank of India took partial action, defending the currency by expanding international reserves and slowing the decline in value. However, in mid-1991, with foreign reserves nearly depleted, the Indian government permitted a sharp devaluation of ~18% that took place in two steps within three days (1 July and 3 July 1991).

== Emergency financing ==
With India's foreign exchange reserves at $1.2 billion in January 1991 and depleted by half by June, barely enough to last for roughly 3 weeks of essential imports, India was only weeks away from defaulting on its external balance of payment obligations.

The Government of India's immediate response was to secure an emergency loan of $7 billion from the International Monetary Fund by pledging 67 tons of India's gold reserves as collateral security. The Reserve Bank of India had to airlift 47 tons of gold to the Bank of England and 20 tons of gold to the Union Bank of Switzerland (UBS) to raise $600 million. The government, in the midst of the 1991 Indian general elections, conducted the airlift with secrecy. The news of the government pledging the entire gold reserves against the loan outraged national sentiments and caused a public outcry. The gold was transported to London via a chartered plane from May 21 to May 31, 1991. The Chandra Shekhar government, which authorised the airlift, collapsed a few months later. This move was seen as prioritising the balance of payment crisis over the welfare of the Indian people and kick-started P.V. Narasimha Rao's economic reform process. In 2024, the RBI has returned its 100 tonnes of gold reserves to India from the UK for the first time since 1991, and by this process, India started holding most of the gold reserves in its own vaults.

=== Under the Narasimha Rao government ===
P. V. Narasimha Rao took over as Prime Minister in June, and appointed Dr Manmohan Singh as the Finance Minister. The Narasimha Rao government ushered in several reforms that are collectively referred to as liberalisation in the Indian media.

The reforms formally began on 1 July 1991 when RBI devalued the rupee by 9% and by a further 11% on 3 July. It was done in two doses to test the reaction of the market first by making a smaller depreciation of 9%. In his 24 July 1991 Budget speech, Singh described the reform programme as extending beyond stabilisation, citing industrial-policy deregulation, reduced import licensing, greater use of foreign investment and technology, approval of up to 51% foreign equity in specified high-priority industries, and disinvestment of up to 20% of government equity in selected public-sector undertakings. The economic reforms pushed by Prime Minister Rao were met with significant opposition from those who believed that they resulted in a reduction of India's autonomy. The speech made by then Prime Minister Rao, a week after taking office, emphasized the need for these reforms. As reported by the New York Times, "Mr. Rao, who was sworn in as Prime Minister last week, has already sent a signal to the nation—as well as the I.M.F.—that India faced no "soft options" and must open the door to foreign investment, reduce the bureaucratic red tape that stifles initiative, and streamline industrial policy."

== Aftermath ==
Since the implementation of economic reforms in 1991, India has experienced substantial economic growth and has emerged as a prominent participant in the global economy. The liberalisation policies of the Indian government have facilitated this growth by attracting foreign investments, increasing trade relations, and promoting domestic economic reforms.

However, while some argue that these policies have benefited India, there are criticisms that suggest otherwise. Some experts argue that the growth has been uneven, and the benefits of liberalisation policies have not been equally distributed across the country. Inequality has increased as the divide between the rich and poor has widened, and marginalized communities have been left behind. Additionally, some have argued that liberalisation policies have had negative impacts on the environment and have not addressed issues related to sustainability and social justice.

Despite these criticisms, the Indian government continues to promote liberalisation policies and seeks to further integrate into the global economy. The success of these policies remains a subject of debate and continues to be a significant point of discussion among policymakers, economists, and civil society groups.

India's gross domestic product (GDP), adjusted for inflation, increased from $266 billion in 1991 to $4.18 trillion in 2025, while its purchasing power parity increased from $1 trillion in 1991 to $17 trillion in 2025.

Poverty has declined steeply from 55.1% in 2005–06 to 16.4% in 2019–20. In addition to the economic growth and development, access to basic necessities such as food, shelter, and healthcare have drastically improved for people in India. Additionally, life expectancy has consistently improved from an average of 58.7 years in 1990 to an average of 67.2 in 2021.

These challenges while not unique to developing countries, are being addressed considerably well by India over the last few decades. The Indian government has implemented various policies to address these issues, such as poverty alleviation programs, healthcare initiatives, and education reforms. While progress has been significant, there is room for more to promote sustainable development in India.

=== Continued current account deficit ===
Despite implementing liberal reforms in 1991, India has been unable to eliminate its current account deficit. In contrast to countries like China and Vietnam, which have managed to achieve a surplus, India continues to face this imbalance. Consequently, India relies on foreign capital inflows in the form of foreign direct investment (FDI) and foreign portfolio investment (FPI) to meet its balance of payments requirements. This dependence on foreign investment makes India more susceptible to external shocks.

An example of such vulnerability is the potential impact of the U.S. Federal Reserve raising interest rates. In the event of a rate hike, foreign investors in "risky" emerging markets like India may redirect their investments towards "safe" markets such as Europe and the U.S. As a result, these investors would sell their assets denominated in Indian rupees in exchange for foreign currency assets. Consequently, India's foreign exchange reserves would diminish, and the value of the rupee would weaken and imports would become more expensive.

== See also ==
- Corruption in India
- Economic history of India
- Economy of India
- Licence Raj
- Economic liberalisation in India
