= Spaghetti Junction (disambiguation) =

Spaghetti junction is a nickname applied to many road junctions (including a list of junctions).

Spaghetti Junction may also refer to:

- Spaghetti Junction, Birmingham, West Midlands, England
- Tom Moreland Interchange, Atlanta, United States
- "Spaghetti Junction", a song by Outkast from the album Stankonia

== See also ==
- Spaghetti Bowl (disambiguation)
