= Hindu rate of growth =

Pejorative term for India's 1950–1980 growth

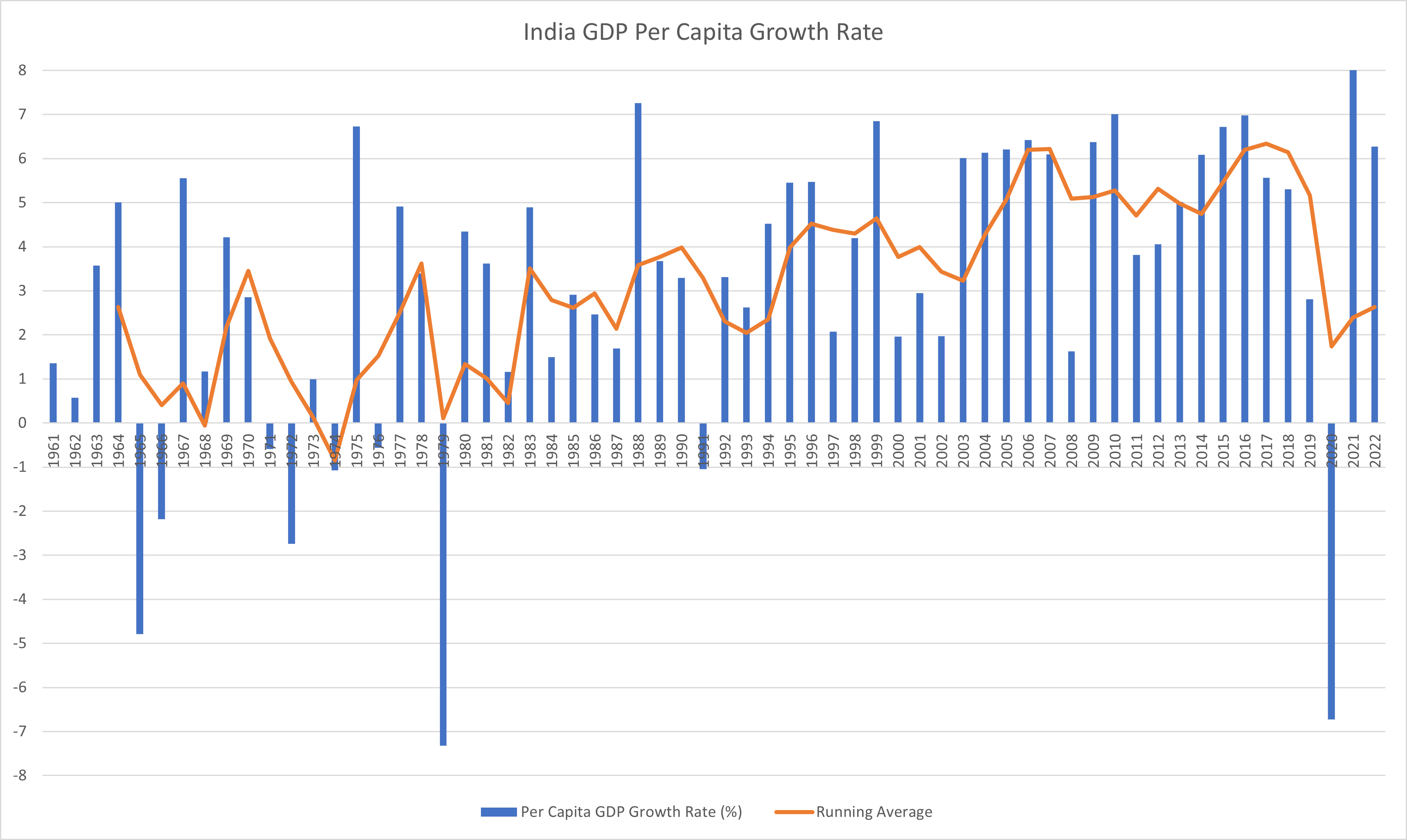
The Gross Domestic Product Per Capita (GDP Per Capita) Growth Rate: India had previously experienced periods of robust economic growth even prior to the 1991 reforms. Moreover, the growth rate has demonstrated a slowing trend since 2016, prior to the onset of the COVID-19 pandemic.

The "Hindu rate of growth" refers to India's annual growth rate from the 1950s to the late 1970s, usually put at ~3.5%. Some sources cite about 4% and extend the period to the 1980s. The phrase is credited to the Indian economist Raj Krishna, who is variously said to have coined it in the mid-1970s, in 1978, or in 1982.

According to the New Oxford Companion to Economics in India, Krishna used it as a "polemical device" to highlight growth that remained steady through "changes in governments, wars, famines, and other crises." Economists disagree about when the period of slow growth ended, dating the acceleration variously to around 1980 and to the 1991 reforms.

== Term and its origin ==
According to Gautam Chikermane of the Observer Research Foundation, the civil servant B.P.R. Vithal first linked India's growth rate to Hinduism in February 1973, writing under the pseudonym "Najin Yanupi" that India’s per-capita growth rate was "the range within which alone the Hindu view of life will hold." Arvind Virmani and Rajeev Malhotra similarly describe Vithal as "perhaps the first to suggest a connection between Hindu culture and the nature of economic development."

Indian economist Raj Krishna is credited with the phrase. Montek Singh Ahluwalia, in the first Raj Krishna Memorial Lecture in 1995, said that Krishna coined it "in the mid-seventies" to describe India's trend growth, which "at that time appeared stuck at 3.5% to 4% per year." Chikermane dates Krishna's use to 1978, while several news sources, citing the New Oxford Companion to Economics in India, place it in 1982. According to the companion, Krishna described it as "a polemical device intended to draw attention to the meagre 3.5% growth rate experienced by India over the long run" and the rate's stability across "changes in governments, wars, famines, and other crises" made it "for him an inherently cultural phenomenon." Chikermane calls the term "noxious and contemptuous", while others have argued that "the term Hindu was not used to denigrate the Hindu community."

== Economic policy, 1950-1991 ==
After independence in 1947, India adopted a mixed-economy model with elements of both socialism and capitalism. Planning aimed at industrialisation and self-reliance, prioritising heavy industry and import substitution. Industrial investment and capacity required government licences, and imports and foreign exchange were tightly controlled, a system later known as Licence Raj. In 1976, amidst the emergency, the 42nd Amendment added the word "socialist" to the Indian Constitution.

Critics attributed slow growth to these policies. Jagdish Bhagwati and Padma Desai argued in 1970 that industrial policies and import controls produced inefficiencies and slowed growth. Anne Osborn Krueger estimated that rents from import licences amounted to over 7% of national income in 1964. Writing in 1997, S. L. Kapur argued that the strategy left "isolated India from the rest of the world," noting that India's share of world trade fell from 2% in the 1950s to less than 0.5% in the 1980s.

A 1998 BBC report described the "Hindu rate of growth" as an explanation that blamed Indian culture, and argued instead that "India's vibrant entrepreneurial culture was stifled by restrictive economic policies". Others have defended the record of the early planning years. Economist Pulapre Balakrishnan, as quoted in the Indian Express, notes that GDP growth rose from under 0.9% a year under colonial rule (1900–1996) to 4.1% in 1950–1964. and per-capita growth from 0.1% to 1.9%, and argues that Krishna's per-capita measure "succeeds in masking the degree of progress made in the Nehru era."

India moved towards a more market-oriented approach in the 1990s, which some scholars describe as neoliberal. Waquar Ahmed links the transition to wider shifts in the global economy, including the dissolution of the Soviet Union and the rise of globalisation. After the 1991 balance-of-payment crisis, the government abolished a significant amount of industrial licensing, reduced tariffs and import controls, and opened more sectors to foreign investment.

== Criticism ==
Former BJP union minister and journalist Arun Shourie claimed that the "Hindu rate of growth" was a result of socialist policies implemented by governments:

because of those very socialist policies that their kind had swallowed and imposed on the country, our growth was held down to 3–4 per cent, it was dubbed — with much glee — as ‘the Hindu rate of growth’.

According to Sanjeev Sanyal, the term was an attempt to suggest that "it was not Nehruvian economic policies that had failed India, it was India’s cultural moorings that had failed Nehru." He linked it with what he considered to be the ideological domination of the left, backed by the socialist regime, in post-Independence India. However, Raj Krishna, who coined the term, opposed the Congress government. After the Indira Gandhi government was ousted in 1977, he became a member of the Planning Commission under the Janata Party government.

The term is also seen by some as oversimplifying the complex economic, political, and social factors that contribute to a country's rate of growth. Economic growth is influenced by a wide range of factors such as education, infrastructure, political stability, and access to capital, among others. It also neglects the progress in self-reliance that India had attained in metallurgical, mechanical, chemical, power and transport sectors.

== See also ==
- Economic history of India
- Economic liberalisation in India
- Licence Raj
- Poverty in India
- The World Economy: Historical Statistics
- Economic history of the Indian subcontinent
