= Economic liberalisation in India =

Economic liberalisation in India refers to the policy changes, made mainly from 1991 onwards, that opened the Indian economy to foreign trade and investment and gave markets and private enterprises a larger role. Although some attempts at liberalisation occurred in 1966 and the early 1980s, a more comprehensive reform came in 1991.

The 1991 reforms followed a balance-of-payments crisis in which foreign exchange reserves fell to about three weeks of imports. The crisis followed a decade of large fiscal deficits and rising external debt, and was triggered by the oil-price spike and the loss of Gulf remittances caused by the Gulf War of 1990–91, as well as the collapse of trade with the Soviet Union. The reforms dismantled most industrial licensing, cut tariffs, moved the rupee to a market-determined exchange rate, opened many sectors to foreign investment, and freed interest rates and capital markets. India borrowed from the International Monetary Fund (IMF) and the World Bank, whose loans carried policy conditions; how far those conditions, rather than the government's own programme, drove the reforms is disputed. At his now famous budget speech that instituted the reforms, Manmohan Singh said on 24 July 1991: "Let the whole world hear it loud and clear. India is now wide awake."

Growth has been faster since the reforms than in earlier decades, and poverty has fallen sharply, although economists debate how much of that fall was due to reforms. Critics point to rising income inequality, slow growth in formal employment and agrarian distress, while supporters of the reform argue that land, labour, and agricultural markets were left largely unreformed.

== Pre-liberalisation policies ==
Indian economic policy after independence was shaped by the colonial experience, which was exploitative and began as a takeover by a British trading company, and by leaders' ideas, particularly Prime Minister Nehru's exposure to Fabian socialism. Under the Congress Party governments of Nehru and his successors, policy tended toward protectionism, with a strong emphasis on import substitution industrialisation under state monitoring, state intervention at the micro level in all businesses, especially in labour and financial markets, a large public sector, business regulation, and central planning. The annual growth rate of the Indian economy averaged around 4% from the 1950s to 1980s, while per-capita income growth averaged 1.3%.

During the brief rule of the Janata Party in the late 1970s, the government, seeking to promote economic self-reliance and indigenous industries, required multinational corporations to partner with Indian corporations. The policy proved controversial, reduced foreign investment, and led to the high-profile exit of corporations such as Coca-Cola and IBM from India. They re-entered the Indian market following the reforms.

== Reforms before 1991 ==
=== 1966 liberalisation attempt ===
In 1966, rapid inflation caused by the Sino-Indian War and a severe drought forced the Indian government to seek monetary aid from the International Monetary Fund (IMF) and World Bank. Pressure from the Bretton Woods institutions caused a shift toward economic liberalisation, in which the rupee was devalued to combat inflation (even though devaluation results in increased import costs) and cheapen exports and the former system of tariffs and export subsidies was abolished. However, a second poor harvest and subsequent industrial recession helped fuel political backlash against liberalisation, characterised by resentment at foreign involvement in the Indian economy and fear that it might signal a broader shift away from socialist policies. As a result, trade restrictions were reintroduced, and the Foreign Investments Board was established in 1968 to scrutinise companies investing in India with more than 40% foreign equity participation.

=== Economic reforms during the 1980s ===
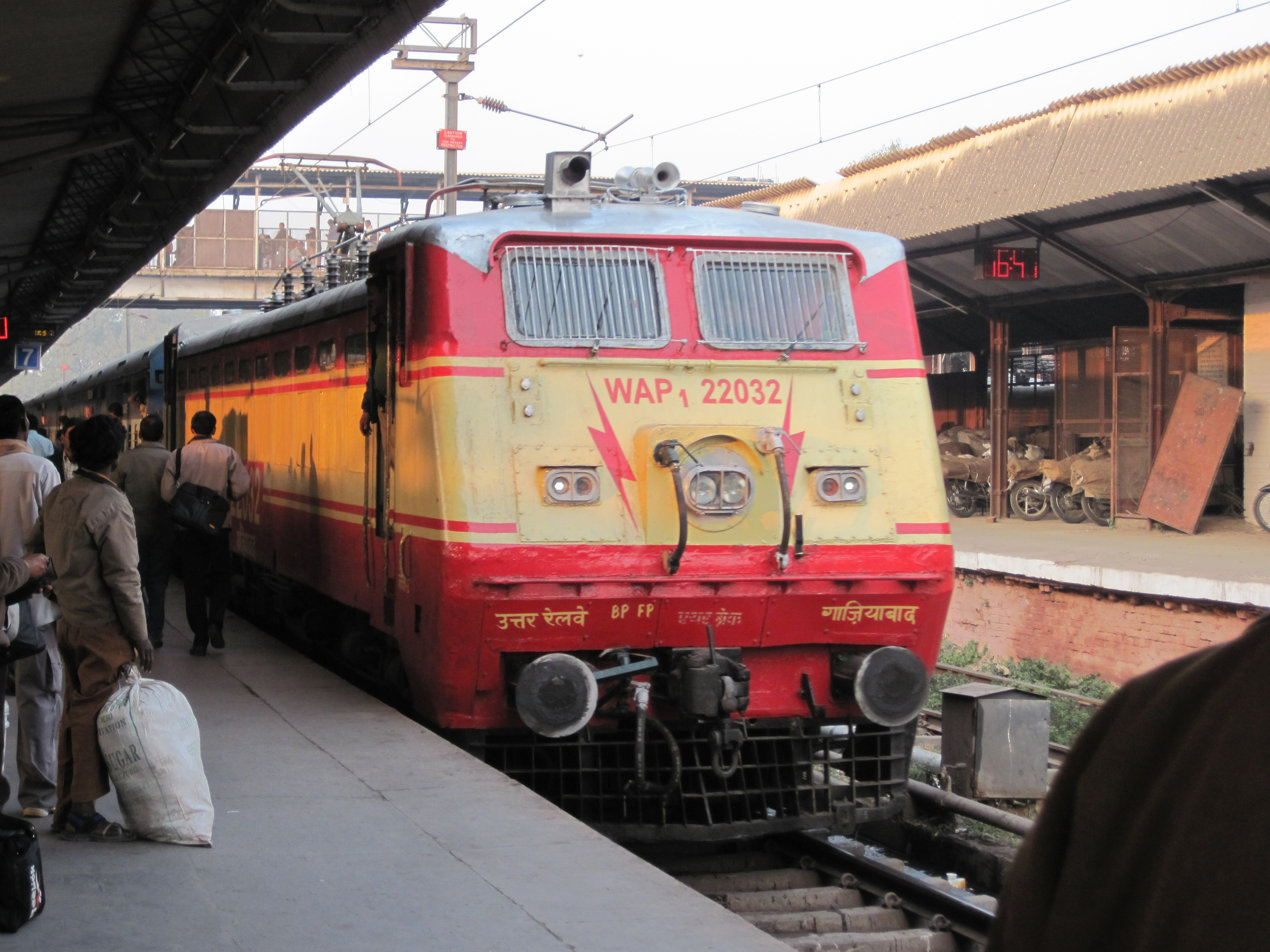
WAP-1 locomotive developed in 1980

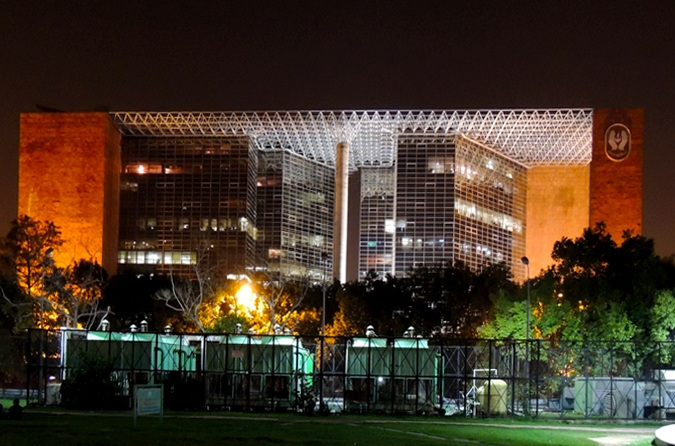
LIC Jeevan Bharti building opened in 1986

As it became evident that the Indian economy was lagging behind its East and Southeast Asian neighbours, the governments of Indira Gandhi and subsequently Rajiv Gandhi began pursuing economic liberalisation. The New Computer Policy of 1984 was instrumental, as it eased import restrictions on technology, encouraged private investments, and provided incentives for software exports. This policy led to rapid growth in India's hardware and software sectors. Organizations like NASSCOM (established in 1988) supported the industry by fostering development, standardizing practices, and promoting Indian IT firms globally. India also established Software Technology Parks (STPs) to provide infrastructure, tax benefits, and faster data communications, enabling companies to export software services globally. The governments loosened restrictions on business creation and import controls while also promoting the growth of the automobile, digitalization, telecommunications and software industries. These reforms coincided with a rise in average GDP growth from 2.9 percent in the 1970s to 5.6 per cent in the 1980s, although they dismantle the Licence Raj. Despite Rajiv Gandhi's dream for more systemic reforms, the Bofors scandal tarnished his government's reputation and impeded his liberalisation efforts.

Growth during the 1980s was higher than in the preceding decades but fragile. It not only culminated in a crisis in June 1991 but also exhibited significantly higher variance than growth in the 1990s. Central to the high growth rate in the 1980s was the high growth of 7.6 percent during 1988–1991. Dani Rodrik and Arvind Subramanian attribute the rise in productivity from around 1980 to a "pro-business" shift in government attitudes rather than to market liberalisation.

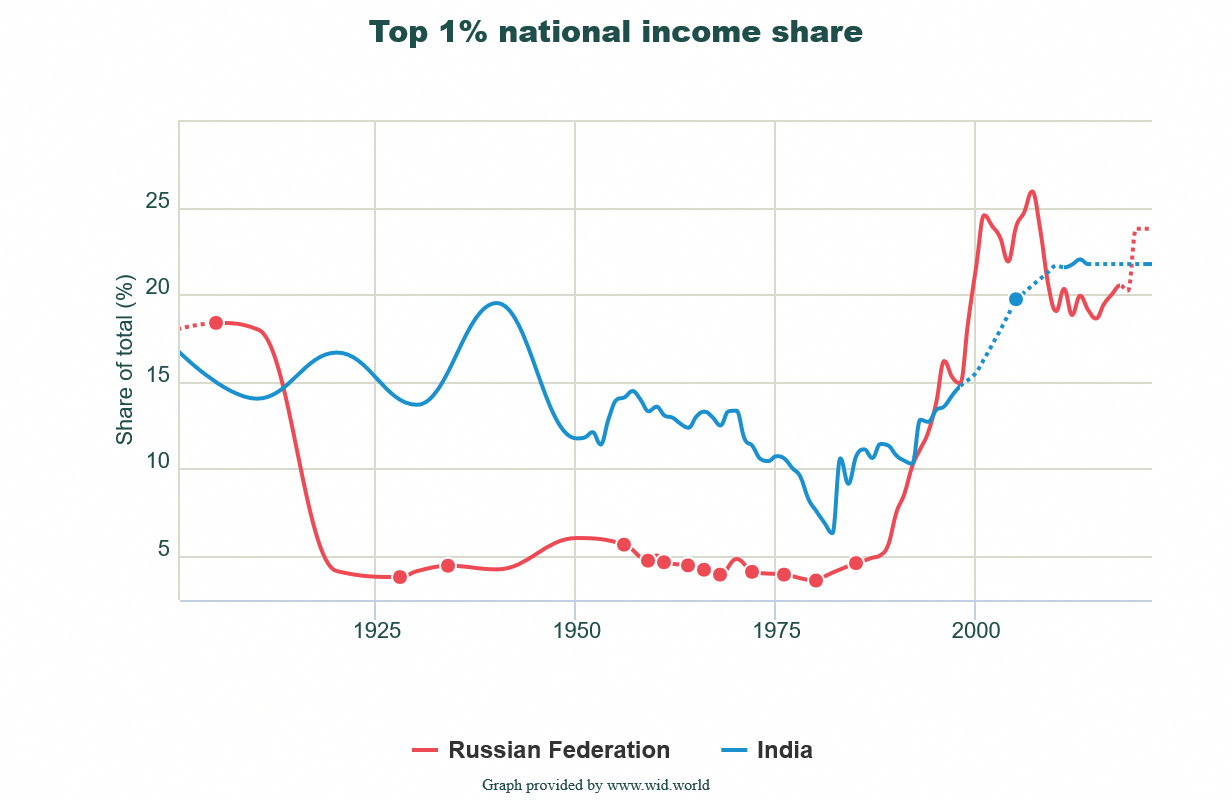
Unlike socialist countries like the USSR, India didn't achieve the same level of income equality post-independence.

== Liberalisation of 1991 ==
=== Crisis leading to reforms ===
With the liberalisation of trade in high-value goods like automobiles, electronics, fridges, washing machines, air conditioners, etc., in the 1980s, Indian imports shot up as significant components were imported. Combined central and state fiscal deficits rose from about 8% of GDP in the first half of the 1980s to 10.1% in the second half, and external debt rose from $20.6 billion in 1980-81 to 64.4 billion in 1989-90. A study by Valerie Cerra and Sweta Saxena found that real overvaluation of the rupee under the fixed exchange-rate regime, current account deficits and investor confidence all contributed to the 1991 currency crisis.

The First Gulf War in 1991, after the Iraqi invasion of Kuwait, resulted in a huge blow to the Indian economy from a spike in oil prices and a drop in remittances from Indian expats in the Gulf region. The government was close to default on its external debt and foreign exchange reserves had fallen to the point that India could barely cover three weeks' worth of imports.

=== Reforms of 1991 ===
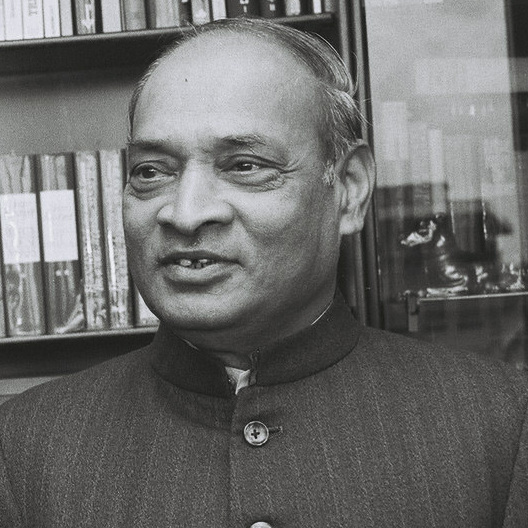
P. V. Narasimha Rao

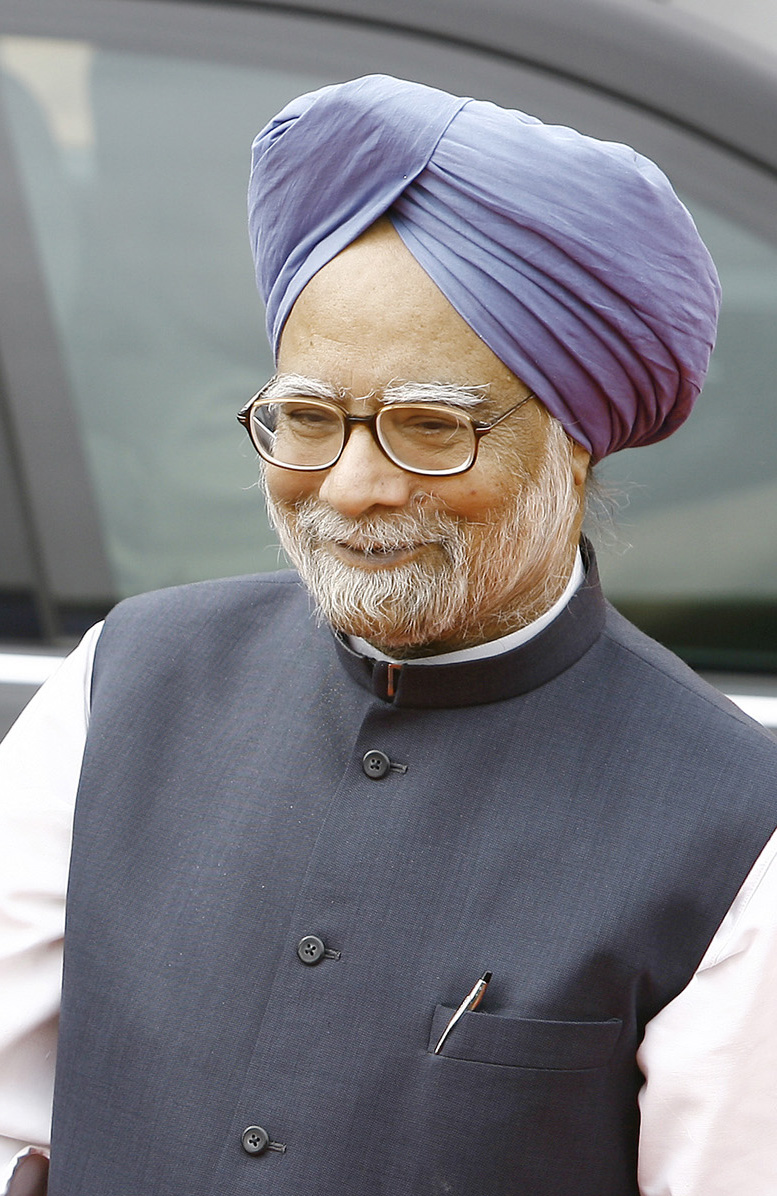
Manmohan Singh

The collapse of the Chandra Shekhar government in the midst of the crisis and the assassination of Rajiv Gandhi led to the election of a new Congress government led by P. V. Narasimha Rao. He selected Amar Nath Verma to be his Principal Secretary and Manmohan Singh to be finance minister and gave them complete support in doing whatever they thought was necessary to solve the crisis. Verma helped draft the New Industrial Policy alongside Chief Economic Advisor Rakesh Mohan, and it laid out a plan to foster Indian industry in five points.

- Firstly, it abolished the License Raj by removing licensing restrictions for all industries except for 18 that "related to security and strategic concerns, social reasons, problems related to safety and overriding environmental issues."
- To incentivise foreign investment, it laid out a plan to pre-approve all investment up to 51% foreign equity participation, allowing foreign companies to bring modern technology and industrial development. To further incentivise technological advancement, the old policy of government approval for foreign technology agreements was scrapped.
- The fourth point proposed to dismantle public monopolies by floating shares of public sector companies and limiting public sector growth to essential infrastructure, goods and services, mineral exploration, and defense manufacturing.
- Finally the concept of an MRTP company, where companies whose assets surpassed a certain value were placed under government supervision, was scrapped.

Meanwhile, Manmohan Singh worked on a new budget that would come to be known as the Epochal Budget. The primary concern was getting the fiscal deficit under control, and he sought to do this by curbing government expenses. Part of this was the disinvestment in public sector companies, but accompanying this was a reduction in subsidies for fertilizer and abolition of subsidies for sugar. He also dealt with the depletion of foreign exchange reserves during the crisis with a 19 per cent devaluation of the rupee with respect to the US dollar, a change which sought to make exports cheaper and accordingly provide the necessary foreign exchange reserves. The devaluation made petroleum more expensive to import, so Singh proposed to lower the price of kerosene to benefit the poorer citizens who depended on it while raising petroleum prices for industry and fuel. Manmohan Singh presented the budget alongside his outline for broader reform. During the speech he laid out a new trade policy oriented towards promoting exports and removing import controls. Specifically, he proposed limiting tariff rates to no more than 150 percent while also lowering rates across the board, reducing excise duties, and abolishing export subsidies.

In August 1991, the Reserve Bank of India (RBI) Governor established the Narasimham Committee to recommend changes to the financial system. Recommendations included reducing the statutory liquidity ratio (SLR) and cash reserve ratio (CRR) from 38.5% and 15% respectively to 25% and 10% respectively, allowing market forces to dictate interest rates instead of the government, placing banks under the sole control of the RBI, and reducing the number of public sector banks. The government heeded some of these suggestions, including cutting the SLR and CRR rates, liberalizing interest rates, loosening restrictions on private banks, and allowing banks to open branches free from government mandate.

=== External financing and conditionality ===
On 12 November 1991, based on an application from the Government of India, World Bank sanctioned a structural adjustment loan/credit that consisted of two components – an IBRD loan of $250 million to be paid over 20 years, and an IDA credit of SDR 183.8 million (equivalent to $250 million) with 35 years maturity, through India's ministry of finance, with the President of India as the borrower. The loan was meant primarily to support the government's program of stabilization and economic reform. This specified deregulation, increased foreign direct investment, liberalisation of the trade regime, reforming domestic interest rates, strengthening capital markets (stock exchanges), and initiating public enterprise reform (selling off public enterprises). As part of a bailout deal with the IMF, India was forced to pledge 20 tonnes of gold to Union Bank of Switzerland and 47 tonnes to the Bank of England and Bank of Japan.

The reforms drew heavy scrutiny from opposition leaders. The New Industrial Policy and 1991 Budget was decried by opposition leaders as "command budget from the IMF" and worried that withdrawal of subsidies for fertilizers and hikes in oil prices would harm lower and middle-class citizens. Critics also derided devaluation, fearing it would worsen runaway inflation that would hit the poorest citizens the hardest while doing nothing to fix the trade deficit. In the face of vocal opposition, the support and political will of the prime minister was crucial in order to see through the reforms. Rao was often referred to as Chanakya for his ability to steer tough economic and political legislation through the parliament at a time when he headed a minority government.

=== Compliance Raj after liberalization ===
PM Modi dismantled the Planning Commission in 2014. Since 2020s, the administration has eliminated over 42,000 unnecessary compliances and decriminalized more than 3,700 legal provisions to enhance the ease of doing business and living. In 2022, The government has decided to wind up Tariff Commission, one of the remnants of the licence permit raj, which had outlived its utility.

== Impact ==
A 2025 study found that the trade liberalization reduced crony capitalism and productivity loss in India, as politically connected firms lost some of their advantage over other firms.

=== Credit boom of the 2000s ===
Private investment in infrastructure significantly increased during the 2000s, driven by an influx of global finance.

Reforms in India in the 1990s and 2000s aimed to increase international competitiveness in various sectors, including auto components, telecommunications, software, pharmaceuticals, biotechnology, research and development, and professional services. These reforms included reducing import tariffs, deregulating markets, and lowering taxes, which led to an increase in foreign investment and high economic growth. From 1992 to 2005, foreign investment increased by 316.9%, and India's GDP grew from $266 billion in 1991 to $2.3 trillion in 2018.

According to one study, wages rose on the whole, as well as wages as the labor-to-capital relative share.

Extreme poverty reduced from 36 percent in 1993–94 to 24.1 percent in 1999–2000.

The liberalisation policies have been criticised for increasing income inequality, concentrating wealth, worsening rural living standards, causing unemployment, and leading to an increase in farmer suicides.

India also increasingly integrated its economy with the global economy. The ratio of total exports of goods and services to GDP in India approximately doubled from 7.3 percent in 1990 to 14 percent in 2000. This rise was less dramatic on the import side but was significant, from 9.9 percent in 1990 to 16.6 percent in 2000. Within 10 years, the ratio of total goods and services trade to GDP rose from 17.2 percent to 30.6 percent. India, however, continues to have a trade deficit, relying on foreign capital to maintain its balance of payments and as such, makes it vulnerable to external shocks.

Foreign investment in India in form of foreign direct investment, portfolio investment, and investment raised on international capital markets increased significantly, from US$132 million in 1991–92 to $5.3 billion in 1995–96.

However, the liberalization did not benefit all parts of India equally, with urban areas benefiting more than rural areas. States with pro-worker labor laws experienced slower industry expansion compared to those with pro-employer labor laws. This led to a "beggar-thy-neighbor" scenario, where states and cities vie to enact the most pro-capital laws at the expense of workers and other states.

After the reforms, life expectancy and literacy rates continued to increase at roughly the same rate as before the reforms.

By 1997, it became evident that no governing coalition would try to dismantle liberalisation, although governments avoided taking on trade unions and farmers on contentious issues such as reforming labour laws and reducing agricultural subsidies. By the turn of the 21st century, India had progressed towards a market economy, with a substantial reduction in state control of the economy and increased financial liberalisation.

The Organisation for Economic Cooperation and Development (OECD) applauded the changes, pointing to their promotion of high economic growth and increases in income:

Its annual growth in GDP per capita accelerated from just 1¼ per cent in the three decades after Independence to 7½ per cent currently, a rate of growth that will double the average income in a decade.... In service sectors where government regulation has been eased significantly or is less burdensome—such as communications, insurance, asset management and information technology—output has grown rapidly, with exports of information technology-enabled services particularly strong. In those infrastructure sectors which have been opened to competition, such as telecoms and civil aviation, the private sector has proven to be extremely effective and growth has been phenomenal.

— OECD

In 2006 India recorded its highest GDP growth rate of 9.6% becoming the second fastest growing major economy in the world, next only to China. The growth rate slowed significantly in the first half of 2012.

The economy then rebounded to 7.3% growth in 2014, 7.9% in 2015 and 8.2% in 2016 before falling to 6.7% in 2017, 6.5% in 2018 and 4% in 2019.

== Later reforms ==
During the Atal Bihari Vajpayee administration, there were extensive liberal reforms, with the NDA Coalition beginning the privatisation of government-owned businesses, including hotels, VSNL, Maruti Suzuki, and airports. The coalition also implemented tax reduction policies, enacted fiscal policies aimed at reducing deficits and debts, and increased initiatives for public works.

In 2011, the second UPA Coalition Government led by Manmohan Singh proposed the introduction of 51% Foreign Direct Investment in the retail sector. However, the decision was delayed due to pressure from coalition parties and the opposition, and it was ultimately approved in December 2012.

After coming to power in 2014, the Narendra Modi led government launched several initiatives aimed at promoting economic growth and development. One of the notable programs was the "Make in India" campaign, which sought to encourage domestic and foreign companies to invest in manufacturing and production in India. The program aimed to create employment opportunities and enhance the country's manufacturing capabilities.

=== Privatisation of airports ===
After 2014, the Indian government under the leadership of Prime Minister Narendra Modi initiated the privatisation of airports in India as part of its policy of economic liberalisation and development. Under this policy, the Airports Authority of India (AAI) has been engaging in Public-Private Partnerships (PPP) with private companies for the development, management, and operation of airports in India. This has led to the privatisation of several airports across the country, including those in Ahmedabad, Lucknow, Jaipur, Guwahati, Thiruvananthapuram, and Mangaluru.

While the privatisation of airports has been hailed as a step towards modernisation and efficiency, there have also been concerns about the potential impact on workers and the local communities. Critics have argued that the privatisation of airports may lead to job losses and a decline in wages, and that the focus on profit-making may lead to neglect of social and environmental concerns.There have also been controversies around the awarding of contracts to private companies, with allegations of corruption and favouritism in the selection process. However, the government has defended its privatisation policy as a necessary step towards achieving economic growth and development in the country.

Under the second NDA Government, the coal industry was opened up through the passing of the Coal Mines (Special Provisions) Bill of 2015. This effectively ended the state monopoly over the mining of the coal sector and opened it up for private, foreign investments, as well as private sector mining of coal.

In the 2016 budget session of Parliament, the Narendra Modi led NDA Government pushed through the Insolvency and Bankruptcy Code to create time-bound processes for insolvency resolution of companies and individuals.

On 1 July 2017, the NDA Government under Modi approved the Goods and Services Tax Act, which had been first proposed 17 years earlier under the NDA Government in 2000. The act aimed to replace multiple indirect taxes with a unified tax structure.

In 2019, Finance Minister Nirmala Sitharaman announced a reduction in the base corporate tax rate from 30% to 22% for companies that do not seek exemptions, and the tax rate for new manufacturing companies was reduced from 25% to 15%. The Indian government proposed agricultural and labor reforms in 2020, but faced backlash from farmers who protested against the proposed agricultural bills. Eventually, due to the sustained protests, the government repealed the agricultural bills.

== Criticisms ==
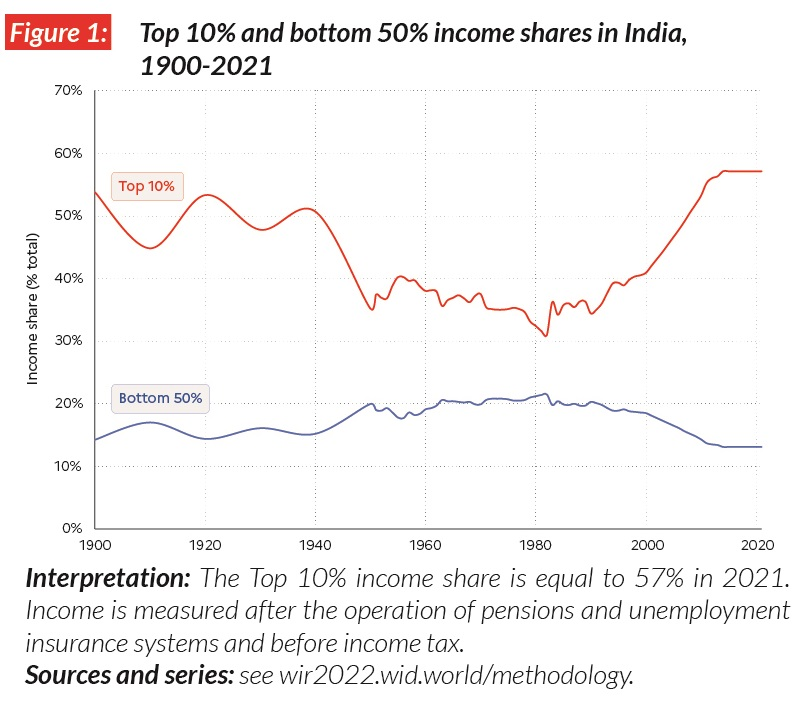
Top 10% and bottom 50% income shares in India 1900–2021

After 1991, the Indian government removed some restrictions on imports of agricultural products causing a price crash while cutting subsidies for the farmers to keep government intervention to the minimum as per neoliberal ideals causing further farmer distress.

The liberalization of the economy made India more vulnerable to global market forces, such as fluctuations in commodity prices, exchange rates and global demand for exports. This increased the country's dependence on global market forces, as it became more susceptible to external shocks and economic crises. A commonly cited example of this is the 2008 financial crisis; although the Indian banking sector had low exposure to US banking sector, the crisis still had a negative impact on the Indian economy due to lower global demand, decline in foreign investment and tightening of credit.

=== Employment ===
Initially, the liberalization policies did accelerate the pace of employment generation. However, over the years, this growth in employment has slowed down significantly. A study suggests that even supporters of liberalisation concede that the immediate impact on the labor market has been negative. This is particularly true in sectors like agriculture and manufacturing, where the reforms have not satisfactorily addressed the challenges, resulting in minimal job creation despite high economic growth overall.

The employment growth rate in the period between 2004-2005 and 2011-2012 was just 0.45% per annum, and analyses of long-term trends have indicated that periods of higher economic growth have not translated into job creation, a phenomenon often described as "jobless growth".

According to the Centre for Monitoring Indian Economy (CMIE), although India's population has increased, the workforce has remained stagnant at just over 400 million since 2018 and the quality of jobs has remained low.

The service sector, despite its substantial contribution to India's GDP, is often characterized by high productivity but low employment generation. This is because the fastest-growing sub-sectors within services, such as software services, telecommunications, and banking, are capital intensive, not requiring as much labor as other sectors like agriculture or manufacturing. Capital-intensive industries often require the importation of machinery and technology, which can lead to increased current account deficit (with its accompanying vulnerabilities) and is considered a leakage of domestic investment and spending. India's manufacturing sector has seen increased import intensity, meaning that a significant portion of the inputs needed for production comes from imports.

=== Vulnerabilities from international integration ===
The integration into global markets has also made India susceptible to foreign monetary policies, particularly those of the U.S. Federal Reserve. Changes in the Fed's policy rates can have a direct impact on the Indian market through various channels. Rate hikes by the Fed tend to strengthen the U.S. dollar against other currencies, including the Indian rupee, which increases the debt servicing costs for Indian borrowers with loans in foreign currency.

A stronger dollar can lead to capital outflows from India as the interest rate differential between the U.S. and India narrows, making India less attractive to foreign investors as emerging markets are considered 'risky'. These capital outflows can influence asset prices and increase market volatility in India, as well as deplete foreign exchange reserves and create liquidity issues. India's foreign exchange reserves are built through foreign capital inflows instead of a current account surplus like in the case of Russia or China.

Additionally, the central bank is forced to raise interest rates in order to arrest some of the capital outflows hence reducing domestic demand and accompanying economic effects.

==== Vulnerabilities from global commodity prices ====
India continues to be vulnerable to effects of global commodity prices, particularly the price of crude oil. The long-term effects include a heightened vulnerability to an increase in the import bill and Current Account Deficit, depreciation of the Indian Rupee and an inflationary impact associated with a rise in crude oil prices.

India's approach to food self-sufficiency is shaped by strategic state policies that have historically insulated it from the kind of food scarcity experienced by some African nations that are heavily reliant on food imports.

Data from the Petroleum Planning & Analysis Cell of the Ministry of Oil indicates that India's import dependence for crude oil has escalated to 87.8% in August 2023, an increase from 86.5% in the prior year.

==== Dependence on global export demand ====
Neoliberal reforms have led to a significant increase in exports as a share of the India's GDP. While this has fueled growth in some sectors, it also means that the Indian economy becomes more vulnerable to fluctuations in global market demand. Over-reliance on exports can lead to economic instability if global demand weakens or if there are competitive pressures from other countries. Moreover, this strategy often results in neglecting the domestic market and local production capacities, which can exacerbate economic inequalities and reduce self-sufficiency.

India's export demand, influenced by the global market, has seen a contraction in recent times. In April 2023, India's merchandise exports contracted by 12.7%, with imports also seeing a sharp decline due to low demand in the U.S. and EU Markets.

==== Impact on domestic monetary and fiscal policies ====
India's fiscal policies have been criticised by some for prioritizing the demands of foreign investors over the domestic demand and well-being of its citizens. The criticism is rooted in the observation that the Indian government has adopted a regime of fiscal austerity, where it has been reducing its fiscal deficit relative to its GDP by cutting down on revenue expenditure such as welfare, subsidies, and other services. This austerity in revenue expenditure has led to a significant reduction in government spending on welfare, such as health, rural employment, social assistance, child care centers, midday meals, and maternity benefits. As a consequence, the domestic demand is depressed, real wages are falling, and employment situation is dire.

BVR Subrahmanyam, the CEO of NITI Aayog said in a speech about cutting funding for Ministry of Women and Child Development “I still remember when we were cutting off … women and child – state subject – 36,000, make it 18,000 crores,” that is 360 billion rupees ($5.8bn) to 180 billion rupees ($2.9bn).

Additionally, the incomes of informal workers, such as food delivery platform workers, have fallen, and their net incomes have declined significantly after accounting for inflation and fuel costs.

The government's economic policies, shaped by the desire to attract foreign capital is criticised by some for causing a deterioration in the economic condition of the working class, which potentially leads to a cycle of reduced aggregate demand, further hurting the economy and making it subservient to the interests of foreign capital at the expense of its domestic prosperity.

===== Cutting of state finances =====
In a study conducted in January 2023, researchers from the National Institute of Public Finance and Policy examined state revenues. Their analysis revealed that in 17 of the 18 states they investigated, the income generated from state-level taxes diminished after implementation of GST compared to the pre-GST era. This decline was observed in terms of the percentage of the gross state domestic product (GSDP). This reduction in revenue leads to states being forced to cut back on spending.

=== Income Inequality ===
The liberalisation of the Indian economy was followed by a large increase in inequality with the income share of the top 10% of the population increasing from 35% in 1991 to 57.1% in 2014. Likewise, the income share of the bottom 50% decreased from 20.1% in 1991 to 13.1% in 2014. It has also been criticised for decreasing rural living standards, rural employment and an increase in farmer suicides. Income inequality in India has been a major concern, especially since 2016. The top 10% of the population holds 77% of the total national wealth, with the richest 1% acquiring 73% of the wealth generated in 2017, while the poorest half of the population, about 670 million people, saw only a 1% increase in their wealth.

The annual income of the bottom 20% of households in India experienced a sharp decline of 53% during the pandemic year of 2020-21 compared to their 2015-16 levels, and have yet to bounce back to pre-pandemic levels. In contrast, the top 20% of households saw their annual income increase by 39%. This challenges the neoliberal argument that economic liberalisation benefits all segments to some extent, even if it exacerbates income disparities.

=== Poverty ===
Poverty continues to persist in India, before the COVID-19 pandemic there were 59 million Indians living below $2 a day and 1,162 million living between $2.01 and $10 a day. Low government expenditure on healthcare has resulted in a healthcare quality divide between rich and poor as well as between the rural and urban population.

==== Decline in consumption ====
The 2017-18 National Sample Survey on consumer expenditure in India which was leaked revealed a worrisome decline in consumer spending, marking the first such drop in 40 years. The survey indicated that the average monthly spending by an Indian fell by 3.7% to Rs 1,446 from Rs 1,501 in 2011–12. In rural areas, the decline was even sharper at 8.8%, although urban spending saw a 2% rise over the same period.

Despite these concerning findings, the government decided not to release the report, citing "data quality issues" and later scrapped the survey altogether. This action was seen as a rejection of evidence by the government, especially since such surveys are crucial for setting the base year for key macroeconomic data like GDP.

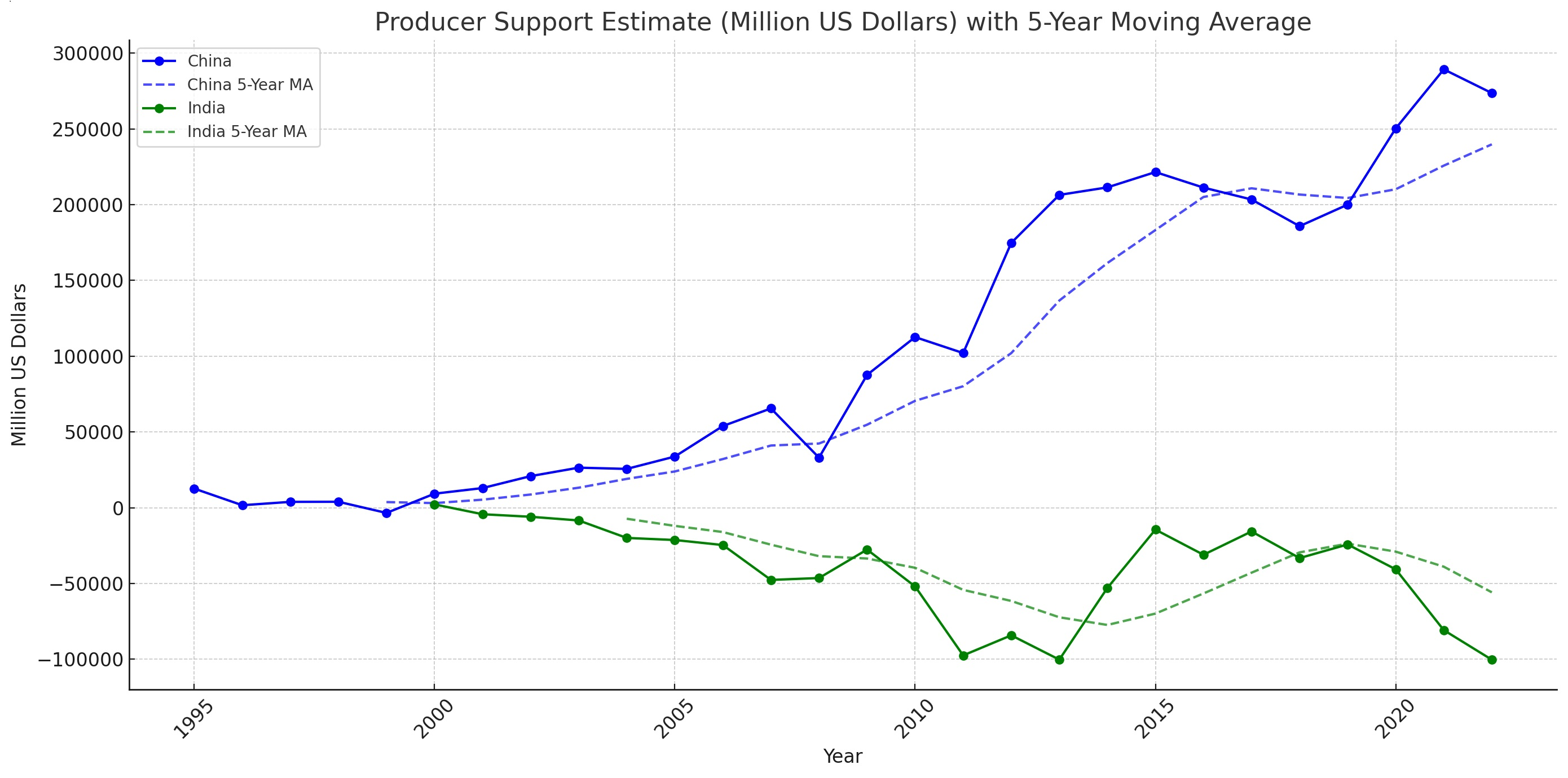
India's Producer Support Estimate consistently registers negative figures, suggesting that the government is more inclined towards taxing or discouraging its agricultural producers, rather than providing them with support or subsidies.

=== Agrarian crisis ===
Neoliberal economic policies have markedly shaped India's agricultural crisis, impacting a vast number of people since more than 70% rely on farming for their livelihood. This situation is intensified by several economic strategies, particularly those shaped by the World Trade Organization (WTO) demands. The WTO urges countries such as India to cut back on agricultural subsidies, which are crucial for sustaining food security and supporting the rural economy.

Post-1991 economic reforms explicitly rejected the need for institutional transformation in agriculture, leading to a contraction of the role of the Indian state. The state was encouraged to withdraw its protectionist disposition, making way for a free, privatised, and financialised market. The opening up of the markets exposed small farmers to volatile global market forces influenced by heavy subsidies given to agriculture sector in developed countries, against which they were not equipped to compete.

With the withdrawal of state support and the opening up of agricultural markets, many farmers have had to take loans to keep up with the increased costs of farming, leading to a debt trap for many. The debt trap resulted in a high incidence of farmer suicides. In 2017 alone, 10,655 farmers took their lives due to these pressures.

== See also ==
- Economy of India
- Globalization in India
- Licence Raj
- Hindu rate of growth
- Economic miracle
- Indian Diaspora
- Income inequality in India
- Remittances to India
