= Licence Raj =

Industrial licencing system in India (1950s-1991)

Licence Raj, Permit Raj, Permit-Licence Raj, or Quota-Permit-License Raj (rāj, meaning "rule" in Hindi) is a term coined by Indian independence activist and statesman C. Rajagopalachari for the system of strict government control and regulation of the Indian economy. Under the system, which rested on the Industries (Development and Regulation) Act in 1951, and lasted until the early 1990s, businesses needed government licences to set up, expand, or change production, and these were often difficult to obtain.

Licence Raj was intended to protect Indian industry, promote economic self-reliance, and ensure regional equality. Up to 80 government agencies had to grant approval before a private company could produce something and, if granted, the government regulated the production. Economists including Jagdish Bhagwati, Padma Desai, and Anne Osborn Krueger have argued that the system misallocated resources, restricted competition, and created large rents for those who secured licences. Real economic growth during the era averaged about 3.5% a year, a record the economist Raj Krishna called the "Hindu rate of growth".

The term "Licence Raj" is a play on the "British Raj" which refers to the period of British rule in India. Chakravarti Rajagopalachari’s criticism of the Licence Raj stemmed from his opposition to strict government control and regulation of the economy. Rajagopalachari believed that the Licence Raj had the potential for political corruption and economic stagnation, and founded the Swatantra Party to oppose these practices. Reforms that began in 1991 have significantly reduced industrial licencing. Economists still debate how much of India's later growth acceleration should be attributed to dismantling the Licence Raj, and how much to changes that began in the 1980s.

== Origins ==
=== Socialist influence and Nehru ===
Following the Russian Revolution, socialist thinkers in India began drawing parallels between the pre-revolution Russian proletariat and the Indian masses under colonial rule, seeing socialism as a way to empower poor Indian farmers. Following Indian independence, these socialist factions, most importantly Jawaharlal Nehru's conception of democratic socialism, influenced the policies of the Licence Raj.

He also visited the Soviet Union in 1927, and this experience may have further influenced his views on socialism. Nehru described himself as a socialist, and in his 1936 address to the Indian National Congress at Lucknow, he identified socialism as the key to solving India's problems. In 1955, the Congress formally adopted a goal to establish a "socialist pattern of society" at its Avadi session.

However, Nehru's policies as Prime Minister were often more pragmatic than strictly socialist. He believed in a strong, centralised government and a planned economy, but also recognised the importance of private enterprise and the market in driving economic growth and development. Nehru also believed that protecting domestic industries would promote industrialisation and economic development in India, and he implemented several protectionist policies during his time in office.

He saw such government intervention as a way to modernise an economy which he regarded as impoverished by colonial rule. Unlike the Soviet Union, India retained a substantial private sector in its early decades: Nehru's government pursued a mixed economy, with strategic industries under state control and public sector corporations guiding investment.

The economic centralisation and controls required for the war effort during World War II helped create the bureaucratic and manufacturing infrastructure needed to implement Nehru's plans, and so, after independence and his election as prime minister, he could put his ideas into action. In his speech to the Constituent Assembly of India, he declared:

"The service of India means the service of the millions who suffer. It means the ending of poverty and ignorance and disease and inequality of opportunity."

=== Support from businesses ===
Leading industrialists also backed planning and protection. The Bombay Plan of 1944, drafted by JRD Tata, G. D. Birla and other leading industrialists, called for state investment in heavy industry and controls on imports. Sociologist Vivek Chibber argues that businesses accepted controls that shielded them from foreign competition, while resisting the discipline the government tried to impose, which helped shape a licensing system that protected established firms.

=== Opposition and origin of the term ===
By the late 1950s, the Swatantra Party, the country's first classical liberal political party, had formed in opposition to Nehru's policies. This party argued economic policies were incompatible with democracy. In a memorandum to party officials, they claimed that "the best guarantee of speed in progress is a maximum of individual freedom and a minimum of governmental interference." They argued that Nehru's policies stifled individual initiative and freedom and slowed economic progress.

C. Rajagopalachari, one of the founders of the Swatantra Party, coined the term "Permit-Licence Raj" to encapsulate the party's frustrations with Nehru's policies, writing in his weekly Swarajya:

I want the corruptions of the Permit/Licence Raj to go... I want real, equal opportunities for all and no private monopolies created by the Permit/Licence Raj.

Opposition also came from within the economics profession. In 1955, the government convened a Panel of Economists to review the draft Second Five-Year Plan; of its 21 members, Bellikoth Raghunath Shenoy was the only one to dissent from the memorandum endorsing the plan. Shenoy objected to the plan's size and its reliance on deficit financing, which he warned would cause inflation, and opposed the general extension of state ownership and control over industry. Shenoy had attended Frederick Hayek's lectures in 1931, and his critique drew on the Austrian school's arguments against central planning. American economist and statistician Milton Friedman, who visited India in 1955 as a consultant to the Indian minister of finance, wrote a memorandum to the government criticising the plan's emphasis on heavy industry and controls and recommended reliance on markets and a flexible exchange rate, while stating that the government was following policies that are "likely to hinder rather than promote economic development."

== Features ==
=== Central planning ===
A key characteristic of the Licence Raj was a Planning Commission, a non-constitutional body, that centrally administered the country's economy. Like a command economy, India followed the Soviet Union model of five-year plans. However, unlike the Soviet Union, the private sector also played a role. The Planning Commission was set up in 1950 to survey the country's resources and formulate plans to raise the standard of living.

The Planning Commission enacted the First Five-Year Plan in 1951 to develop the agricultural sector amid severe food shortages and an influx of refugees from the Partition, and that plan led to a 4% increase in GDP, higher than the projected 2%. Nehru's government hoped to build on the success of the First Five Year Plan with an ambitious Second Five-Year Plan aimed at continuing agricultural and infrastructure investment while developing heavy industry and increasing employment. The second plan, drafted under statistician Prasanta Chandra Mahalanobis, and prioritised state-led heavy industry. But the plan failed to reach its goal of 5% growth, and its investment programme, which exceeded available domestic resources and depended on imported capital goods and technology, depleted the country's foreign exchange reserves. The foreign exchange crisis and rising prices were among the outcomes Shenoy had warned of.

=== Industrial licencing ===
Another main characteristic of the Licence Raj was substantial regulation of the industry. Legislation to regulate industry began with the Industries (Development & Regulation) Act of 1951, which imposed licensing restrictions on industries it designated as Schedule I, including industrial machinery, telecommunications, and chemical manufacturing. Next, the Industrial Policy Resolution of 1956 extended these restrictions by designating certain industries as Schedule A, exclusively under state control, and certain other industries under Schedule B, majority state-owned. Schedule A industries included defence production, metallurgy, mining, and transportation.

Licences governed not only entry into an industry but also a plant's location, product mix, and maximum capacity, and firms needed government permission to expand output beyond licenced limits. The Monopolies and Restrictive Trade Practices Act of 1969 added a further layer, requiring large firms and business houses to obtain approval before expanding or establishing new undertakings. Official inquiries found that the system favoured established business houses: the Hazari report (1967) and the Dutt Committee (1969) found that large groups had obtained a disproportionate share of licences, sometimes applying for licences to pre-empt capacity and keep out competitors.

=== Reservation for small industry ===
From 1967, the government reserved products for exclusive manufacture by small-scale units, starting with 47 items; the list peaked at 873 items in 1984. Large firms were barred from expanding capacity in reserved products. The policy survived the 1991 reforms and was largely dismantled in the 2000s. A study of dereservation found that removing products from the list was followed by increases in employment and output, driven largely by new entrants.

=== Banking ===
During the 1960s, the Indian banking sector came under criticism for being controlled by a few big industrialists in large cities, and thus failing to meet the needs of rural Indians and small-scale industry. In response, the government of Indira Gandhi began pursuing "social control" of banking institutions, with Deputy Prime Minister Morarji Desai spearheading the Banking Laws (Amendment) Bill in 1968 to regulate the commercial banks' leadership. The bill stipulated that at least 51% of the directors should not be directly connected to monopolies and big business, that industrialist chairmen had to be replaced by professional bankers, and that banks could not form relationships with companies tied to their own directors. Additionally, Desai forged the National Credit Council (NCC) to regulate credit allocations and bring more credit to rural areas and small industry. However, many of these changes were rendered moot when Indira Gandhi decided to fully nationalise 14 major banks in 1969, with 6 additional banks coming under state control in 1980. The government administered interest rates and required banks to hold a large share of deposits in government securities and to lend at least 40% to "priority sectors". The government set the credit-to-deposit ratio at a minimum of 60% for rural and semi-urban branches.

=== Capital controls, foreign investment and trade ===
Indian capital controls began as wartime restrictions the British imposed on cross-border transactions during World War II, eventually evolving into a complex framework of restrictions on the current and capital accounts. After independence, the Indian government restricted the flow of foreign exchange reserves, and following a balance of payments crisis from 1956 to 1957, it became more concerned with carefully allocating foreign exchange across sectors of the economy. After a failed attempt at liberalisation in 1966, the government established the Foreign Investments Board in 1968 to scrutinise companies investing in India with more than 40% foreign equity participation. Foreign investment that did not involve technology transfers was severely restricted, and foreign collaboration with local companies was conditioned on export quotas. The Foreign Exchange Regulation Act of 1973 required most foreign-owned companies to reduce their shareholding to 40%; IBM and Coca-Cola left India in 1977-78 rather than comply. IBM shut down its plant in Bombay (now Mumbai) and laid off 175 workers, and its then-chairman, Frank T. Cary, called the government's rejection of a compromise "a great disappointment". This tight control over foreign investment became a core part of a broader policy of import substitution industrialisation, the belief that countries like India needed to rely on internal markets for development, not international trade. To achieve this goal, the government imposed strict import restrictions and a complex tariff system with high rates that varied by industry. Anne Kreuger estimated that rents from import licences alone accounted to about 7% of India's national income in 1964.

== Dismantling ==
Controls were relaxed in stages from the late 1970s. In 1985, the Rajiv Gandhi government de-licensed a number of studies and allowed "broad bending", letting firms switch between related products without new licences. The decisive break came in 1991, when a balance-or-payments crisis left foreign-exchange reserves sufficient for only about three weeks of imports. In return for IMF support, India pledged gold as collateral, devalued the rupee and initiated economic reforms.

The government of P. V. Narasimha Rao, with Manmohan Singh as finance minister, issued a new Statement on Industrial Policy on 24 July 1991 that abolished licensing for all but 18 industries, removed the asset limits of the Monopolies and Restrictive Trade Practices Act, 1969, and allowed automatic approval of foreign investment up to 51% in high-priority industries. It also lowered tariffs, duties and taxes and opened up to international trade and investment. Writer Gurcharan Das argued that the controls stifled entrepreneurship and kept growth below its potential.

Compulsory licensing now applies to five industries: alcoholic drinks, tobacco products, electronic aerospace, defence equipment, industrial explosives and hazardous chemicals. The Planning Commission of India was replaced by the NITI Aayog, a policy think tank, on 01 January 2015. In August 2014, the government raised the foreign investment limit in defence to 49% and allowed full foreign ownership in railway infrastructure projects.

== Assessment ==
The fall of the Licence Raj and the implementation of economic liberalisation policies have contributed to increased regional inequality in India. Some experts argue that these policies benefited certain regions of the country, such as the major cities and industrial centers, at the expense of others, leading to a widening gap between rural and urban areas.

It has contributed to mass migration from rural areas to cities, as people sought to take advantage of new economic opportunities and improved living standards in urban areas. This mass migration can place a burden on cities, as they may struggle to accommodate the influx of new residents and provide them with adequate housing, education, and other basic services. Slums in India are a common sight in many cities and are often found in areas that are vulnerable to flooding or other natural disasters. They are often home to marginalised communities, including migrant workers, informal sector workers, and other groups that may be excluded from mainstream society.

The scaling back of public sector enterprises may also have led to a reduction in the ability of the government to direct investment and resources towards priority areas and to protect the interests of workers, minorities and other stakeholders.

One consequence of the Licence Raj was that it benefited large corporations at the expense of smaller businesses. Because large corporations were often better able to navigate the complex bureaucracy of the Licence Raj and secure the necessary licences, they were able to dominate many sectors of the economy. This made it difficult for small businesses to compete, and contributed to a concentration of economic power in the hands of a few large corporations.

Another criticism of the licensing system in India was that it was prone to corruption, as businesses and individuals had to navigate a complex bureaucracy in order to obtain licences and permissions, and may have had to pay bribes or engage in other forms of corruption in order to obtain the necessary approvals. This corruption was fuelled by a broader environment of corruption in India, which was characterised by a lack of transparency and accountability in the government, a weak legal system, and a culture of corruption that had been allowed to persist for many years.

== Legacy ==
Although industrial licencing was largely abolished, many regulatory controls continue to remain in place. Although some states have adopted a more flexible approach to labour laws, it remains heavily regulated. A 2002 study by the Observer Research Foundation and TeamLease, a staffing firm, found that Indian businesses face over 69,000 compliance requirements annually across more than 1500 laws at the central and state levels. Commentators, including Raghuram Rajan, have dubbed continued restrictions on Indian businesses as "inspector raj," or "regulatory cholesterol."

== See also ==
- Economic history of India
- Mafia Raj
- Planned economy
- Socialism in India
- Swadeshi movement
