= Spaghetti Bowl =

Spaghetti bowl may refer to:

- Spaghetti Bowl (American football), a 1945 American football game in Italy
- Spaghetti bowl effect, an economic phenomenon
- Spaghetti junction, a network of highway interconnects (interchange ramps) that look like spaghetti in a bowl when viewed from overhead
  - Spaghetti Bowl (Las Vegas), a freeway interchange in downtown Las Vegas, Nevada, United States

== See also ==
- Spaghetti, a pasta dish sometimes served in a bowl
