= Padma Desai =

Indian-American development economist (1931–2023)

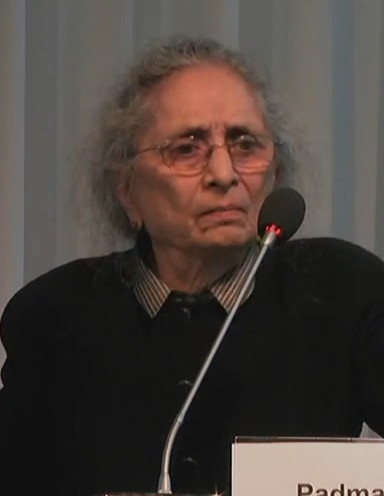
- Desai in 2015
- Born: October 12, 1931; Surat, Bombay Presidency, British India
- Died: April 29, 2023 (aged 91)
- Citizenship: India; United States
- Spouse: Jagdish Bhagwati
- Children: 1
- Awards: Padma Bhushan (2009)

Academic background
- Education: University of Mumbai (BA, MA); Harvard University (PhD)
- Influences: Alexander Gerschenkron; Robert Solow

Academic work
- Discipline: Development economics
- Institutions: Columbia University (1992–2023)

Padma Desai (October 12, 1931 – April 29, 2023) was an Indian-American development economist who was the Gladys and Roland Harriman Professor of comparative economic systems and director of the Center for Transition Economies at Columbia University. Known for her scholarship on Soviet and Indian industrial policy, she was awarded the Padma Bhushan in 2009.

== Early life ==
Desai was born in Surat, Bombay Presidency, British India, on October 12, 1931, into a Gujarati Anavil Brahmin family. Her parents, Shanta and Kalidas, were literature professors who were educated at the University of Cambridge. She had three siblings.

Desai completed her B.A. (Economics) in 1951 from the University of Mumbai, followed by an M.A. (Economics) also from the same university in 1953. Thereafter, she completed her Ph.D. from Harvard in 1960. At Harvard University, she was influenced by economists Alexander Gerschenkron and Robert Solow. She was a fellow of the American Association of University Women while pursuing her Ph.D. at Harvard.

== Career ==
Desai started her career at the Department of Economics, Harvard (1957–1959), after which she was associate professor of economics at Delhi School of Economics at University of Delhi, from 1959 to 1968.

Desai's 1968 book India: Planning for Industrialization, which was co-written with her future husband and economist Jagdish Bhagwati was an influential critique of India's industrial planning system. The work influenced subsequent economic liberalisation in India. The book spoke against the licence regime and the command economic policies that were prevalent in India at the time.

Desai joined Columbia University as a professor of economics in 1980. In November 1992, she became Gladys and Roland Harriman Professor of Comparative Economic Systems at Columbia University and went on to become the director of the Center for Transition Economies at the university.

Desai's research included studying the Soviet economy, specifically studying the command economies and the misallocation of resources therein. She built on the studies of economists Alexander Gerschenkron and Robert Solow, studying the decelerating growth rates in the Soviet economies, separating the contributions from technology led productivity gains and capital led growth. In her book Perestroika in Progress (1989) she studied the misallocation of resources in command economies and the resulting damages and losses across sectors. She continued to study the Russian economy after the Soviet dissolution and trained US policymakers and continued to speak on Russian economic policies. She was the U.S. Treasury's advisor to the Russian Finance Ministry in the summer of 1995.

Desai was president of the Association for Comparative Economic Studies in 2001. She was awarded the Padma Bhushan, India's third highest civilian honor, by the Government of India in 2009.

Desai published her memoir, Breaking Out: An Indian Woman's American Journey in 2012. The book spoke about her journey from India to America, breaking out of an emotionally abusive marriage, and establishing herself as an economist studying many shacked economies.

== Personal life ==
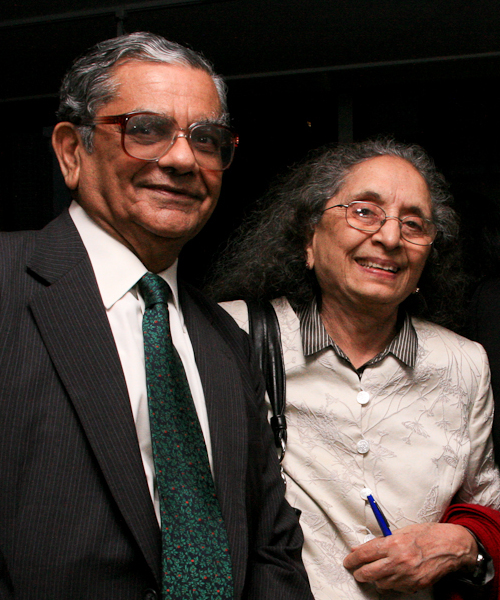
Padma Desai with husband Jagdish Bhagwati in 2012

Desai was married to Jagdish Bhagwati, also an Indian-American economist and professor of economics and law at Columbia University; the couple had one daughter. She first befriended him in 1956. They were both faculty members at the Delhi School of Economics in the 1960s. The two attempted to get married but restrictive divorce laws in India prevented Desai from divorcing her first husband until 1969 when she converted to Christianity (religious conversion was grounds for divorce in India). Bhagwati and Desai married in Mexico.

Desai died on April 29, 2023, at age 91.

== Bibliography ==
- Breaking Out: An Indian Woman's American Journey. Viking, 2012. ISBN 9780670085781.
- From Financial Crisis to Global Recovery. HarperCollins, 2012. ISBN 9789350295823.
- Conversations on Russia: Reform from Yeltsin to Putin. Oxford University Press, 2006. ISBN 9780195300611.
- Financial Crisis, Contagion, and Containment: From Asia to Argentina. Princeton University Press, 2003. ISBN 9780691113920.
- Work Without Wages: Russia's Non-Payment Crisis, with Todd Idson. MIT Press, 2001. ISBN 9780262041843.
- Going Global: Transition from Plan to Market in the World Economy, Editor. MIT Press, 1997. ISBN 9780262041614.
- The Soviet Economy: Problems and Prospects. Blackwell, 1990. ISBN 9780631171836
- Perestroika in Perspective: The Design and Dilemmas of Soviet Reform. I B Tauris & Co, 1989. ISBN 9781850431411.
- Bokaro Steel Plant: A Study of Soviet Economic Assistance. North-Holland, 1972. ISBN 9780720430653.
- India: Planning for Industrialization (with Jagdish Bhagwati). 1968. ISBN 9780192153340
