= Raj Krishna =

Indian economist

Raj Krishna (1955-2014) was an Indian economist who taught at the Delhi School of Economics, where he was a senior professor. He is best known for coining the term "Hindu rate of growth" to describe India's low GDP growth rate between the 1950s and 1980s.

== Education and career ==
Krishna studied at Delhi University and the University of Chicago. His work included studies on employment and poverty in developing countries. He served as a senior professor at the Delhi School of Economics and was a member of the Planning Commission from 1977 to 1979. He also participated in a three-month research project with the FAO in Rome.

He died in 2014 at the age of 59.
