= Spaghetti bowl effect =

Notion of excessive free trade agreements limiting trade

The spaghetti bowl effect is the multiplication of free trade agreements (FTAs), supplanting multilateral World Trade Organization negotiations as an alternative path toward globalization. The term was first used by Jagdish Bhagwati in 1995 in the paper: “US Trade policy: The infatuation with free trade agreements”, where he openly criticized FTAs as being paradoxically counter-productive in promoting freer and more opened global trades. According to Bhagwati, too many crisscrossing FTAs would allow countries to adopt discriminatory trade policies and reduce the economic benefits of trade.

== Context ==
In 1947, the most economically prominent nations signed the multilateral General Agreement on Tariffs and Trade (GATT), whose main goals were to reduce tariffs and other trade barriers as well as eliminate discriminatory treatments between signatory countries. After gradual rounds of negotiations, more countries were integrated and tariffs were significantly reduced. The World Trade Organization (WTO) was created in 1995 to meet the growing institutional needs of a deepening globalization.

However, because of the increasing number of members and interest diversity, as well as the complication of the topics discussed (subsidies, intellectual property, etc.), liberalization negotiations have slowed down since the 1990s. The last WTO Negotiation Round, the Doha Round, launched in 2001, stalled over disagreements on agricultural subsidies and market access, as well as intellectual property issues.

In this way, many countries have been resorting to bilateral and multilateral FTAs as a faster and more flexible way to promote free trades and globalization. Indeed, FTAs require only the consent of a limited number of like-minded countries, as opposed to the general consent of all WTO members necessary to conclude a negotiation round. Such agreements also allow countries to tackle broader issues such as bilateral investments, labor migration and regulations. As a result, the numbers of FTAs in force and in negotiations have exploded since the mid-1990s, passing from 100 agreements in 1990 to more than 400 in 2008.

== Challenges posed by FTAs according to J. Bhagwati ==
This FTA trend has been described by many economists as a more pragmatic way to promote free trade and globalization. Jagdish Bhagwati strongly opposes this opinion, describing the entanglement of hundreds of FTAs with various rules, tariffs and institutional arrangements as a “spaghetti bowl”.

Bhagwati identifies several problems inherent to FTAs, which make them unfit to promote a clear and global trade liberalization with widespread benefits:

- A founding principle of the GATT, and later the WTO, is the non-discriminatory principle or “Most Favored Nation Clause” (MFN), stating that GATT country-members cannot discriminate between their trade partners. In this way, any special favor should be granted to all trade partners without distinction. FTAs would constitute a loophole in the MFN clause, enabling states to enforce different level of tariffs and trade barriers.
- Rules of Origins (RoO) define traded goods’ eligibility for FTAs’ preferential tariffs regimes. Every FTA sets its own geographical conditions of production for concerned goods. Because of globalization and the development of international supply chains, rules of origins fail to reflect goods’ complex international origins and are often impossible to enforce.
- FTAs are associated with high costs for both governments and firms. To enjoy FTAs’ preferential tariffs, firms need to undergo complex administrative tasks, prove goods’ origins and adapt to FTAs’ many regulations. Thus, FTAs would entail high administrative fixed costs for firms, precluding smaller firms to fully enjoy preferential tariffs, and depleting member-countries’ overall competitiveness.
- While multilateral trade liberalization increases World trades level, FTAs can sometimes be trade-diverting. Bilateral trades surge between two FTAs signatories, however trades with tier-countries are likely to fall. Thus, FTAs lead to both trade creation and diversion.
- Bhagwati, also deplores the lack of political and economic equality characterizing FTA relations. In general, FTAs would be signed between an important economic power, such as the United States or the European Union, with smaller and less powerful countries. The bigger state can use its larger market as a leverage to introduce non-trade related measures concerning regulations, migration, labor standards or the environment. At the opposite, multilateral negotiations would allow for a more equal liberalization since every country can defend its own interests.
- Freer trades are a useful tool for least developed countries to obtain more capital, new technologies and better business practices. However, those countries often offer fewer market and investment opportunities, thus more developed countries will choose to direct their negotiations capacities toward richer regions. In 2017, the European Union had 5 FTAs with Sub-Saharan countries out of a total of 43 FTAs in place. As developed countries effectively lower trade barriers and tariffs between them, countries at the margin are faced with higher tariffs which are hurtful for their development.

Several empirical studies have been led to determine the Spaghetti Bowl Effect's true cost on countries’ trade volumes and competitiveness. Japanese Researchers from Keio University, observed 132 countries and established that, even though trade volumes were positively correlated with FTAs, this effect was characterized by diminishing returns. In this way, the increasingly heavy and costly administrative burden caused by the multiplication of FTAs would deter firms to use FTA's preferential tariffs, thus proving a Spaghetti Bowl Effect.

== Noodle Bowl Effect ==
Asian countries have seen a dramatic rise in FTAs since the beginning of the 21st century. In 2000, only 3 FTAs were in force, nine years later, 37 FTAs were in force and 72 under negotiations. Important hubs, such as the People's Republic of China, Japan and the Association of South-East Asian Nations (ASEAN) emerged. The growing de facto economic integration combined with a lack of common economic institutions has led Asian countries to adopt pro-FTAs trade policies.

As a result, both firms and governments, started to worry about the burden imposed by the Asian trade environment's growing complication. This phenomenon was nicknamed "The Noodle Bowl Effect" by several newspapers and academics to highlight its endemic Asian nature. In a 2009 survey, only 20.8% of South Korean firms, 29% of Japanese firms and 45.1% of Chinese firms effectively used FTAs . 20% of the surveyed firms across Asia considered multiples rules of origins as costly for their businesses. Smaller firms were also more deterred from using FTAs’ preferential tariffs because of the high and complex administrative burden.
