= Foreign portfolio investment =

International investment in securities

A foreign portfolio investment is a grouping of assets such as stocks, bonds, and cash equivalents. Portfolio investments are held directly by an investor or managed by financial professionals. In economics, foreign portfolio investment is the entry of funds into a country where foreigners deposit money in a country's bank or make purchases in the country's stock and bond markets, sometimes for speculation.

== Synopsis ==
Most foreign portfolio investments consist of securities and other foreign financial assets that are passively held by the foreign investor. This does not provide the foreign investor with direct ownership of the financial assets and can be relatively liquid depending on the volatility of the market that the investment takes place in. Foreign portfolio investments can be made by individuals, companies, or even governments in international countries. This type of investment is a way for investors to diversify their portfolio with an international advantage.

Foreign portfolio investment shows up in a country's capital account. It is also part of the balance of payments which measures the amount of money flowing in and out of a country over a given time period.

Foreign portfolio investment is similar, but differs from foreign direct investment. In foreign portfolio investment the investor purchases stocks, securities and other financial assets but does not actively manage the investments or the companies that are issuing the assets. So, in FPI the investor does not have direct control over the securities or businesses. This means that FPI tends to be more liquid and less risky than FDI. The relatively high liquidity of FPI's makes them much easier to sell than FDI's. Foreign portfolio investments also tend to have a shorter time frame for returns than foreign direct investments.

Some benefits that come to investors from utilizing foreign portfolio investments include:

- Portfolio diversification: FPI gives investors a fairly simple way to diversify their portfolio internationally.
- International Credit: FPI gives investors a larger credit base because they are able to access credit in the foreign countries that they have large amounts of investment in.
- Benefits from the Exchange rates: If an investor has an FPI in a foreign country with a stronger currency than their own country the difference in exchange rates between the two countries can benefit the investor
- Access to a larger market: Often markets may be larger and less competitive outside of ones home country. For example, the market is much more competitive in the United States of America than in other less developed economies. Investors can take advantage of the less competitive markets internationally by using these Foreign portfolio investments.

Portfolio investments typically involve transactions in securities that are highly liquid, i.e. they can be bought and sold very quickly. A portfolio investment is an investment made by an investor who is not involved in the management of a company. This is in contrast to direct investment, which allows an investor to exercise a certain degree of managerial control over a company. Equity investments where the owner holds less than 10% of a company's shares are classified as portfolio investment. These transactions are also referred to as "portfolio flows" and are recorded in the financial account of a country's balance of payments.

Portfolio flows arise through the transfer of ownership of securities from one country to another. Foreign portfolio investment is positively influenced by high rates of return and reduction of risk through geographic diversification. The returns on foreign portfolio investment can come from interest payments, non-voting dividends, increases in the market value of securities held in the portfolio, the foreign currency becoming stronger relative to the home currency, or some combination of the previous factors.

== See also ==
- Foreign ownership
