= Jagdish Bhagwati =

Indian-born American economist (born 1934)

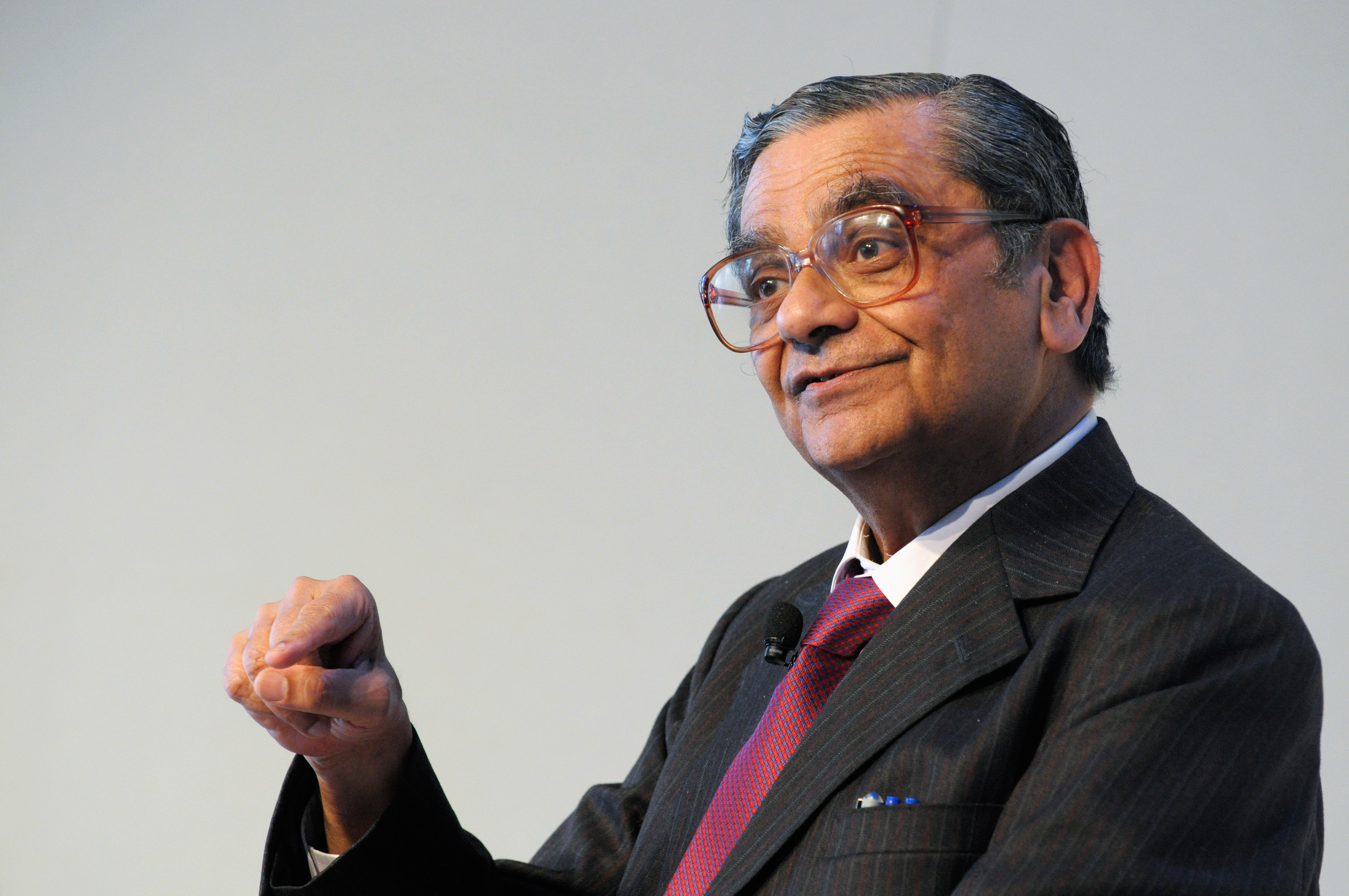
- Bhagwati in 2008
- Born: July 26, 1934 (age 92); Bombay, Bombay State, British India (present-day Mumbai, Maharashtra, India)
- Citizenship: United States
- Spouse: Padma Desai

Academic background
- Education: Sydenham College, Bombay (BA); St John's College, Cambridge (BA); Massachusetts Institute of Technology (PhD)
- Doctoral advisor: Charles P. Kindleberger
- Influences: Robert Solow

Academic work
- Discipline: International economics, globalization, free trade
- School or tradition: Neoclassical economics
- Institutions: Columbia University; Indian Statistical Institute; Delhi School of Economics; MIT; Sydenham College
- Doctoral students: Gene Grossman; Caroline Freund
- Awards: Padma Vibhushan

Jagdish Natwarlal Bhagwati (born July 26, 1934) is an Indian-born naturalized American economist and trade theorist. He is a university professor of economics and law at Columbia University and a senior fellow in international economics at the Council on Foreign Relations. He has made contributions to international trade theory and economic development.

He had a chair named after him while he was still teaching at the university. He is one of only 10 scholars who hold the title of University Professor at Columbia University. Bhagwati is the recipient of the Order of the Rising Sun, Padma Vibhushan, Frank Seidman Distinguished Award in Political Economy and the Freedom Prize of Switzerland.

In 2014, the Financial Times called him "one of the most outstanding economists of his generation never to have won the Nobel Prize". This view is shared by his peers including Nobel Prize winning economist Paul Krugman, "The crucial point for me is that people didn't understand at all clearly how distortions in a trading economy relate to policy before Jagdish spelled it out. Once he did, it became so clear that it was hard to believe that someone had to point it out. In my view, that makes his work Nobel-worthy."

== Early years and personal life ==
Bhagwati was born in 1934, into a Gujarati family in the Bombay Presidency during the British Raj. He is the son of Indian judge Natwarlal H. Bhagwati and the brother of P. N. Bhagwati, former Chief Justice of India and also of S.N. Bhagwati, an eminent neurosurgeon who served as the president of the Neurological Society of India.

Bhagwati attended St. Xavier's High School and received a BCom from Sydenham College, Mumbai. He then traveled to England to study at St. John's College, Cambridge, receiving a second BA at Cambridge (in economics) in 1956. Between 1957 and 1959 he studied at Nuffield College, Oxford. He received a PhD in economics from the Massachusetts Institute of Technology in 1967 for a thesis titled "Essays in International Economics," supervised by Charles P. Kindleberger. He has also received honorary degrees from the University of Sussex and Erasmus University, as well as others.

Bhagwati is married to Padma Desai, also a Columbia economist and Russia specialist; they have one daughter. Bhagwati and Desai's joint 1970 OECD study India: Planning for Industrialization was a notable contribution at the time.

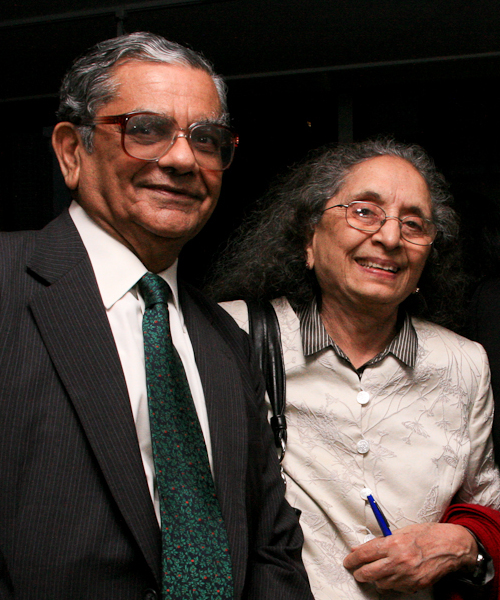
Bhagwati with wife Padma Desai, 2012

== Career ==
After completing his PhD, Bhagwati returned to India in 1961, first to teach briefly at the Indian Statistical Institute, Kolkata, and then as professor of international trade at Delhi School of Economics at the University of Delhi, from 1962 to 1968. He then returned to American academia and from 1968 until 1980, Bhagwati was the Ford International Professor of Economics at the Massachusetts Institute of Technology.

From 1980 he taught economics at Columbia University, where he was Arthur Lehman Professor of Economics and Professor of Political Science and later University Professor, Economics and Law. He is one of only 10 scholars who hold the title of University Professor at Columbia University.

Bhagwati is a Senior Fellow of the Council on Foreign Relations in New York and is a Member of the National Academy of Sciences and the American Philosophical Society. He currently serves on the Academic Advisory Board of Human Rights Watch (Asia) and on the board of scholars of the Centre for Civil Society.

He was special adviser to the United Nations on globalization, economic policy adviser to Arthur Dunkel-the director-general of General Agreement on Tariffs and Trade and external adviser to the World Trade Organization. He has also worked as a member of group appointed by the director-general of the WTO on the future of the WTO.

He was also a member of the advisory committee to UN Secretary General Kofi Annan on the New Partnership for Africa's Development, an economic program accelerating economic co-operation and integration among African countries.

In May, 2004, Bhagwati was one of the experts who took part in the Copenhagen Consensus project.

In 2006, Bhagwati was a part of the Eminent Persons Group along with Brazilian President Fernando Henrique Cardoso on the future of United Nations Conference on Trade and Development (UNCTAD). In early 2010, Bhagwati joined the advisory board of the Institute for Migrant Rights in Indonesia.

In 2000, Bhagwati was signatory to an amicus briefing, coordinated by the American Enterprise Institute, with the Supreme Court of the United States to contend that the Environmental Protection Agency should, contrary to a prior ruling, be allowed to take into account the costs of regulations when setting environmental standards.

In January 2004, Bhagwati published In Defense of Globalization, a book in which he argues that globalization, when properly governed, is the most powerful force for social good in the world today. He described how globalization helps the cause of women, reduces child labor and increases literacy. He makes a point that:

... this process [of globalization] has a human face, but we need to make that face more agreeable.

Jagdish Bhagwati was the fictional winner of the Nobel Prize in Economics in The Simpsons episode "Elementary School Musical".

== Awards, honors and commentary ==
- Mahalanobis Memorial Medal of the Indian Econometric Society (1974)
- Fellow of the American Academy of Arts and Sciences (1982)
- Member of the American Philosophical Society (1995)
- Seidman Distinguished Award in International Political Economy (1998)
- Padma Vibhushan Award (2000)
- Lifetime Achievement Award of the Indian Chamber of Commerce (2004)
- Order of the Rising Sun, Gold and Silver Star (2006)
- Member of the National Academy of Sciences (2012)

Nobel laureate Paul Samuelson, on the occasion of Bhagwati's 70th birthday festschrift conference in Gainesville, Florida in January 2005 said:

I measure a scholar's prolific-ness not by the mere number of his publishings. Just as the area of a rectangle equals its width times its depth, the quality of a lifetime accomplishment must weight each article by its novelties and wisdoms. ... Jagdish Bhagwati is more like Haydn: a composer of more than a hundred symphonies and no one of them other than top notch. ... In the struggle to improve the lot of mankind, whether located in advanced economies or in societies climbing the ladder out of poverty, Jagdish Bhagwati has been a tireless partisan of that globalization which elevates global total-factor – productivities both of richest America and poorest regions of Asia and Africa.

Other awards include the Bernhard Harms Prize (Germany), the Kenan Enterprise Award (United States), the Freedom Prize (Switzerland), and the John R. Commons Award (United States). He has also received honorary degrees from the University of Sussex and Erasmus University, as well as others.

== Bibliography ==
=== Books ===
- Jagdish Bhagwati, Arvind Panagariya (2013). Why Growth Matters: How Economic Growth in India Reduced Poverty and the Lessons for Other Developing Countries. PublicAffairs. ISBN 978-1610392716.
- Jagdish Bhagwati, Arvind Panagariya (2013). India's Tryst with Destiny: Debunking the Myths that Undermine Progress and Addressing New Challenges. HarperCollins. ISBN 978-9350295854.
- Jagdish Bhagwati (2008). Termites in the Trading System: How Preferential Agreements Undermine Free Trade. Oxford University Press. ISBN 978-0195331653.
- Jagdish Bhagwati (2007). In Defense of Globalization. Oxford University Press. ISBN 978-0195330939.
- Bhagwati, Jagdish (2003). Free Trade Today. Princeton University Press. ISBN 978-0691117300.
- Jagdish Bhagwati (2002). The Wind of the Hundred Days: How Washington Mismanaged Globalization. MIT Press. ISBN 0262523272.
- James H. Mathis, Jagdish Bhagwati (Foreword) (2002). Regional Trade Agreements in the GATT/WTO: Article XXIV and the Internal Trade Requirement. Norwell/TMC Asser Press. ISBN 9067041394.
- Jagdish N. Bhagwati; Robert E. Hudec, eds. (1996). Fair Trade and Harmonization, Vol. 1: Economic Analysis. MIT Press. ISBN 0262024012.
- Jagdish N. Bhagwati (editor) (1977) The New International Economic Order: The North-South Debate. ISBN 0262520427.
- Jagdish N. Bhagwati, ed. (1972). Economics and World Order from the 1970s to the 1990s. Macmillan. ISBN 978-0029034705.

=== Articles ===
- Bhagwati, Jagdish (March 1964). "The Pure Theory of International Trade: A Survey". The Economic Journal. 74 (293): 1–84. doi:10.2307/2228112. JSTOR 2228112.
- Bhagwati, Jagdish (November 1993). "The Case for Free Trade". Scientific American. 269 (5): 18–23. Bibcode:1993SciAm.269e..42B. doi:10.1038/scientificamerican1193-42.
- Bhagwati, Jagdish (Fall 2009). "Feeble Critiques: Capitalism's Petty Detractors". World Affairs. doi:10.3200/WAFS.172.2.36-45.
- Bhagwati, Jagdish (2008). "Protectionism". In David R. Henderson (ed.). Concise Encyclopedia of Economics (2nd ed.). Indianapolis: Library of Economics and Liberty. pp. 425–427. ISBN 978-0865976658. OCLC 237794267.

== See also ==
- Globalization
- Indians in the New York City metropolitan area
- "Spaghetti Bowl" Effect
