= Financial regulation in India =

Financial regulation in India is governed by a number of regulatory bodies. Financial regulation is a form of regulation or supervision, which subjects financial institutions to certain requirements, restrictions and guidelines, aiming to maintain the stability and integrity of the financial system. This may be handled by either a government or non-government organization. Financial regulation has also influenced the structure of banking sectors by increasing the variety of financial products available. Financial regulation forms one of three legal categories which constitutes the content of financial law, the other two being market practices and case law. (Note: Joanna Benjamin 'Financial Law' Oxford University Press)

== History ==
The history of financial regulation in India can be traced back to the early 19th century when the British East India Company established the Bank of Bengal in 1806. Over time, other banks were established, including the Bank of Bombay in 1840 and the Bank of Madras in 1843, which collectively came to be known as the Presidency Banks.

In 1921, the three Presidency Banks were merged to form the Imperial Bank of India, which was later nationalized and renamed as the State Bank of India in 1955. The Reserve Bank of India was established in 1935 as the central bank of the country, with the objective of regulating the currency and credit system of the country and promoting its economic growth.

After India gained independence in 1947, the government took several steps to regulate the financial sector. In 1949, the Banking Regulation Act was passed, which gave the Reserve Bank of India greater control over the functioning of banks and other financial institutions. The Securities and Exchange Board of India (SEBI) was established in 1988 to regulate the securities markets and protect the interests of investors.

In the 1990s, India embarked on a program of economic liberalization and reforms, which included significant changes in the financial sector. The Narasimham Committee was set up in 1991 to examine the state of the financial sector and make recommendations for its reform. Based on the recommendations of the committee, several measures were taken to liberalize the financial sector and promote competition.

In 1993, the Securities and Exchange Board of India Act was passed, which gave SEBI statutory powers to regulate the securities markets. In 1997, the Insurance Regulatory and Development Authority (IRDA) was established to regulate the insurance sector. The Pension Fund Regulatory and Development Authority (PFRDA) was established in 2003 to regulate the pension sector.

=== Chronology ===
Timeline of Indian Financial Registrations
- 1806: The Bank of Bengal is established by the British East India Company.
- 1840-1843: The Bank of Bombay and the Bank of Madras are established, which together with the Bank of Bengal, came to be known as the Presidency Banks.
- 1921: The three Presidency Banks are merged to form the Imperial Bank of India.
- 1935: The Reserve Bank of India is established as the central bank of the country.
- 1947: India gains independence from British rule.
- 1949: The Banking Regulation Act is passed, which gives the Reserve Bank of India greater control over the functioning of banks and other financial institutions.
- 1955: The Imperial Bank of India is nationalized and renamed as the State Bank of India.
- 1988: The Securities and Exchange Board of India (SEBI) is established to regulate the securities markets and protect the interests of investors.
- 1991: The Narasimham Committee is set up to examine the state of the financial sector and make recommendations for its reform. Based on the recommendations of the committee, several measures are taken to liberalize the financial sector and promote competition. The Securities and Exchange Board of India (SEBI) Act is also passed.
- 1992: The Securities and Exchange Board of India (SEBI) is given statutory powers under the SEBI Act.
- 1993: The Securities and Exchange Board of India Act is passed, which gives SEBI statutory powers to regulate the securities markets.
- 1997: The Insurance Regulatory and Development Authority (IRDA) is established to regulate the insurance sector.
- 1999: The National Stock Exchange (NSE) introduces electronic trading, which revolutionizes the Indian stock market.
- 2000: The Securities and Exchange Board of India (SEBI) introduces regulations for internet trading and dematerialization of securities.
- 2003: The Pension Fund Regulatory and Development Authority (PFRDA) is established to regulate the pension sector.
- 2005: The Forward Contracts Regulation Act (FCRA) is passed to regulate the commodity futures market.
- 2012: The Securities and Exchange Board of India (SEBI) introduces the concept of Real Estate Investment Trusts (REITs) to enable investors to invest in the real estate sector through a regulated mechanism.
- 2015: The Reserve Bank of India announces the introduction of the Unified Payments Interface (UPI) to facilitate digital payments in the country.
- 2015: The International Financial Services Centre (IFSC) is set up at the Gujarat International Finance Tec-City (GIFT City) to promote offshore financial services in India.
- 2019: The International Financial Services Centres Authority (IFSCA) is established to regulate financial services in the IFSCs in India.
- 2020: The Reserve Bank of India announces a moratorium on loan repayments and a restructuring scheme for borrowers impacted by the COVID-19 pandemic. SEBI introduces new norms for investment advisers and portfolio managers to enhance investor protection.
- 2021: The Securities and Exchange Board of India (SEBI) introduces a new framework for investment advisors to strengthen their role as fiduciaries to their clients. The Reserve Bank of India (RBI) sets up a committee to review the functioning of asset reconstruction companies (ARCs) and recommend measures to improve their effectiveness.

== Acts and rules ==
India has a comprehensive system of financial regulations that includes a range of acts and rules to govern various aspects of the financial sector. Some of the key acts and rules that regulate the financial sector in India include:

- Reserve Bank of India Act, 1934: This act provides the legal framework for the functioning of the Reserve Bank of India (RBI), which is the central bank of India. The RBI is responsible for regulating the monetary policy of the country, managing the foreign exchange reserves, and supervising the banking sector.
- Banking Regulation Act, 1949: This act regulates the functioning of banks in India and empowers the RBI to supervise and regulate the banking sector.
- Securities and Exchange Board of India Act, 1992: This act established the Securities and Exchange Board of India (SEBI), which is responsible for regulating the securities market in India.
- Insurance Regulatory and Development Authority Act, 1999: This act established the Insurance Regulatory and Development Authority (IRDA), which is responsible for regulating the insurance sector in India.
- Companies Act, 2013: This act governs the formation, management, and operation of companies in India, including those in the financial sector.
- Foreign Exchange Management Act, 1999: This act regulates foreign exchange transactions in India and aims to facilitate external trade and payments.
- Prevention of Money Laundering Act, 2002: This act aims to prevent money laundering and the financing of terrorist activities in India.
- Securities Contracts (Regulation) Rules, 1957: These rules regulate the trading of securities in India and provide guidelines for the functioning of stock exchanges.
- Insider Trading Regulations, 2015: These regulations aim to prevent insider trading in securities and promote fair trading practices.
- Credit Information Companies (Regulation) Act, 2005: This act regulates the functioning of credit information companies in India and aims to promote responsible lending practices.
- Payment and Settlement Systems Act, 2007: This act provides the legal framework for payment and settlement systems in India, including electronic funds transfer, mobile payments, and card payments.
- Consumer Protection Act, 2019: This act aims to protect the rights of consumers in India and includes provisions related to financial services, such as banking, insurance, and investment products.
- National Pension System Trust Regulations, 2015: These regulations govern the functioning of the National Pension System (NPS) in India, which is a voluntary retirement savings scheme for individuals.
- Depositories Act, 1996: This act regulates the functioning of depositories in India, which hold securities in electronic form and facilitate their transfer.
- Public Financial Management System, 2016: This system is an online platform for the management of government finances in India, including budget preparation, expenditure management, and reporting.
- Foreign Contribution (Regulation) Act, 2010: This act regulates the receipt of foreign contributions by non-profit organizations in India and aims to prevent money laundering and financing of terrorism.
- Prudential Norms for Classification, Valuation and Operation of Investment Portfolio by Banks, 2021: These norms provide guidelines for the management of investment portfolios by banks in India, including the classification and valuation of assets.
- Reserve Bank of India (Digital Payment Security Controls) Directions, 2021: These directions provide security controls for digital payments in India, aimed at protecting users from fraud and other risks.
- Securitisation and Reconstruction of Financial Assets and Enforcement of Security Interest Act, 2002: This act provides a framework for the securitisation and reconstruction of financial assets, and enforcement of security interest in such assets, by banks and financial institutions.
- Indian Stamp Act, 1899: This act regulates the payment of stamp duty on various financial instruments, such as promissory notes, bills of exchange, and share certificates.
- Negotiable Instruments Act, 1881: This act governs the use of negotiable instruments, such as cheques, bills of exchange, and promissory notes, in financial transactions.
- Prevention of Atrocities Act, 1989: This act provides for the prevention of offences against members of Scheduled Castes and Scheduled Tribes, and includes provisions related to financial fraud and exploitation of these communities.
- Real Estate (Regulation and Development) Act, 2016: This act regulates the real estate sector in India, including the registration of real estate projects and agents, and the protection of homebuyers.
- Micro, Small and Medium Enterprises Development Act, 2006: This act provides for the promotion and development of micro, small, and medium enterprises in India, including access to credit and other financial services.
- Foreign Trade Policy, 2015-2020: This policy provides a framework for promoting exports and imports in India, including incentives for exporters and regulations for importers.
- Prevention of Insolvency and Bankruptcy Act, 2016: This act provides for the resolution of insolvency and bankruptcy proceedings in India, including the restructuring of debts and liquidation of assets.
- International Financial Services Centres Authority Act, 2019: It is an Indian legislation that provides for the establishment of an independent regulatory authority for the development and regulation of financial services in International Financial Services Centres (IFSCs) in India.The IFSCA Act was enacted to promote the development of financial services in IFSCs in India, with the objective of making India a hub for international finance and business. The Act establishes the International Financial Services Centres Authority (IFSCA) as a statutory body to oversee the development and regulation of financial services in IFSCs.The IFSCA Act provides for a wide range of functions for the IFSCA, including the regulation and supervision of financial institutions and financial services in IFSCs, the promotion of development of financial services in IFSCs, and the protection of the interests of investors and consumers in IFSCs.The IFSCA Act also provides for the establishment of a unified regulatory framework for financial services in IFSCs, including banking, insurance, securities, and other financial services. The Act empowers the IFSCA to make regulations for the conduct of financial services in IFSCs, and also provides for the resolution of disputes related to financial services in IFSCs.

== Regulatory bodies ==
India has several financial regulatory bodies that oversee and regulate different sectors of the financial system. Here are the major regulatory bodies and the sectors they oversee:

1. Reserve Bank of India (RBI): RBI is the central bank of India and regulates the overall banking sector in the country, including commercial banks, cooperative banks, and development banks.
2. Securities and Exchange Board of India (SEBI): SEBI is responsible for regulating the securities market in India, including stock exchanges, brokers, and other market intermediaries.
3. International Financial Services Centres Authority (IFSCA): It is a regulatory body that was established in April 2020 under the International Financial Services Centres Authority Act, 2019.The IFSCA is responsible for regulating all financial services that are provided within the International Financial Services Centre (IFSC) located in GIFT City, Gujarat, India. The IFSC is a special economic zone that was set up to promote international financial services in India.
4. Insurance Regulatory and Development Authority (IRDA): IRDA regulates the insurance sector in India, including life insurance, general insurance, and reinsurance.
5. Pension Fund Regulatory and Development Authority (PFRDA): PFRDA regulates the pension sector in India, including pension funds and the National Pension System.
6. Forward Markets Commission (FMC): FMC regulates the commodity futures market in India.
7. Ministry of Corporate Affairs (MCA): MCA regulates corporate governance, corporate social responsibility, and the formation and management of companies in India.
8. National Housing Bank (NHB): NHB regulates housing finance companies and the housing sector in India.
9. Department of Economic Affairs (DEA): DEA is responsible for the overall economic policies of India, including fiscal and monetary policies.
10. Financial Stability and Development Council (FSDC): The FSDC is a high-level coordinating body that oversees and coordinates the functioning of various financial regulatory bodies in India. It aims to ensure financial stability and promote financial sector development in the country.
11. Deposit Insurance and Credit Guarantee Corporation (DICGC): The DICGC provides insurance to depositors in case a bank fails or becomes insolvent. It insures bank deposits up to a certain amount, which is currently set at Rs. 5 lakhs per depositor per bank.
12. National Bank for Agriculture and Rural Development (NABARD): NABARD regulates and supervises the rural banking sector in India. It provides credit and other support to farmers, rural development organizations, and other rural institutions.
13. Small Industries Development Bank of India (SIDBI): SIDBI provides financial assistance to small and medium-sized enterprises (SMEs) in India. It also promotes the development of the SME sector in the country.
14. Insurance Ombudsman: The Insurance Ombudsman is an independent grievance redressal mechanism for insurance policyholders. It investigates and resolves complaints against insurance companies and other intermediaries.
15. Pension Fund Ombudsman: The Pension Fund Ombudsman is an independent grievance redressal mechanism for NPS and APY subscribers. It investigates and resolves complaints against pension fund managers and other intermediaries.
16. Foreign Exchange Dealers' Association of India (FEDAI): FEDAI sets rules and guidelines for foreign exchange transactions in India. It also acts as a self-regulatory organization for banks dealing in foreign exchange transactions.
17. Clearing Corporation of India Limited (CCIL): It is responsible for providing clearing and settlement services for foreign exchange and money market transactions.
18. Securities Appellate Tribunal (SAT): It is a quasi-judicial body that hears appeals against SEBI's decisions.

== Foreign investment ==
Foreign investment in India is regulated by the Foreign Exchange Management Act (FEMA) and the regulations issued thereunder by the Reserve Bank of India (RBI). The Indian government has liberalized its foreign investment policies over the years, making it easier for foreign investors to invest in India.

Foreign Direct Investment (FDI) is allowed in most sectors under the automatic route, which means that foreign investors do not require prior approval from the government or the RBI for their investment. However, certain sectors such as defense, telecom, and media require prior approval from the government.

Foreign Portfolio Investment (FPI) is another avenue for foreign investors to invest in India. FPI refers to investments by non-resident Indians (NRIs), foreign institutional investors (FIIs), and qualified foreign investors (QFIs) in securities listed on Indian stock exchanges. FPI is subject to certain limits and conditions prescribed by the Securities and Exchange Board of India (SEBI).

Foreign investment in certain sectors is subject to sector-specific caps on foreign ownership, which vary depending on the sector. For example, in the insurance sector, foreign ownership is capped at 49%, while in the defense sector, it is capped at 74%.

The Indian government has also established the Foreign Investment Promotion Board (FIPB), which is responsible for reviewing and approving foreign investment proposals that do not fall under the automatic route. However, the FIPB has been abolished and the government has streamlined the approval process for foreign investment proposals.

== Anti-money laundering ==
India has implemented several measures to prevent money laundering and terrorist financing, including the Prevention of Money Laundering Act (PMLA) of 2002. The PMLA is the primary legislation for combating money laundering in India and is administered by the Financial Intelligence Unit (FIU) of the Ministry of Finance.

Under the PMLA, financial institutions, including banks, insurance companies, and securities firms, are required to conduct due diligence on their customers, monitor their transactions, and report any suspicious transactions to the FIU. The Act also provides for the freezing and seizure of assets suspected to be the proceeds of crime. The act also sets up a specialized agency, the Enforcement Directorate (ED), to investigate and prosecute money laundering cases.

In addition to the PMLA, India has also implemented other measures to combat money laundering, including the Foreign Exchange Management Act (FEMA) and the Income Tax Act. The Reserve Bank of India (RBI) and the Securities and Exchange Board of India (SEBI) have also issued guidelines to their regulated entities for compliance with anti-money laundering regulations.

India is also a member of the Financial Action Task Force (FATF), an intergovernmental organization that sets standards and promotes effective implementation of legal, regulatory, and operational measures for combating money laundering, terrorist financing, and other related threats to the integrity of the international financial system. India is subject to regular reviews by the FATF to ensure compliance with its standards.

In addition to the PMLA, India has implemented several other financial regulations to combat money laundering. These regulations include:

1. Know Your Customer (KYC) norms: KYC norms require banks and financial institutions to verify the identity of their customers before providing any financial services. KYC norms involve obtaining and verifying personal information and documents, such as Aadhaar card, PAN card, passport, and driver's license. KYC norms help to prevent the use of fake or forged documents in financial transactions.
2. Suspicious Transaction Reporting (STR): STR requires banks and financial institutions to report any suspicious transactions to the Financial Intelligence Unit (FIU) of India. Such transactions could include those that are unusual or inconsistent with the customer's known sources of income. Banks and financial institutions are also required to maintain records of these transactions.
3. Foreign Account Tax Compliance Act (FATCA): FATCA is a US law that requires foreign financial institutions to report information about US taxpayers to the US Internal Revenue Service (IRS).India has signed an agreement with the United States to implement FATCA. Under this agreement, Indian financial institutions are required to report information about their American clients to the Indian government, which will then be shared with the US government.
4. Common Reporting Standard (CRS): India has also signed the CRS agreement with other countries to exchange information on financial accounts held by foreign residents.
5. Anti-Money Laundering (AML) guidelines: The Reserve Bank of India (RBI) has issued AML guidelines for banks and financial institutions to follow while conducting financial transactions. These guidelines include measures such as customer due diligence, record keeping, and risk management.
6. Prevention of Money Laundering Act, 2002 (PMLA): The PMLA defines money laundering as an act of disguising the proceeds of a crime as legitimate funds. It also sets out the penalties for those found guilty of money laundering, which can include imprisonment and fines. The act applies to all individuals and entities, including banks, financial institutions, and money changers.

== Banking regulation ==
Banking regulation in India is overseen by the Reserve Bank of India (RBI), which is the central bank of the country. The RBI was established in 1935 and is responsible for regulating and supervising banks and other financial institutions in India.

The RBI's primary objective is to maintain the stability of the Indian financial system, which it achieves through various regulatory measures. Some of the key regulations enforced by the RBI include:

- Capital Adequacy Ratio (CAR): The Reserve Bank of India (RBI) has prescribed a minimum CAR that banks in India must maintain to ensure that they have sufficient capital to absorb unexpected losses.
- Asset Quality Review (AQR): The RBI conducts regular AQRs of banks to ensure that they are accurately reflecting the quality of their assets and that they are adequately provisioned for any losses.
- Prudential Norms: The RBI has prescribed various prudential norms for banks, including limits on exposure to individual borrowers, classification of assets, and provisioning requirements.
- Liquidity Requirements: Banks in India are required to maintain a certain level of liquidity to ensure that they can meet their obligations as they fall due. The RBI has prescribed the minimum liquidity ratio (SLR) and the minimum net stable funding ratio (NSFR) for banks in India.
- Prudential Norms: The RBI has prescribed various prudential norms for banks, including limits on exposure to individual borrowers, classification of assets, and provisioning requirements. These norms are designed to ensure that banks are operating prudently and managing risks effectively.
- Corporate Governance: The RBI has issued guidelines on corporate governance for banks in India, which require banks to have a strong board of directors, robust risk management processes, and effective internal controls.
- Anti-Money Laundering (AML) and Know Your Customer (KYC) norms: The RBI has put in place strict guidelines on AML and KYC to prevent money laundering and the financing of terrorism. Banks are required to carry out due diligence on their customers, monitor transactions, and report suspicious transactions to the relevant authorities.
- Know Your Customer (KYC) and Anti-Money Laundering (AML): Banks are required to comply with KYC and AML guidelines to prevent money laundering and the financing of terrorism.

=== Banking regulation acts ===
There are several banking regulation acts in India that govern the functioning of banks and other financial institutions in the country. Some of the key acts are:

- Reserve Bank of India Act, 1934: This is the primary legislation governing the functions and powers of the Reserve Bank of India (RBI), which is the central bank of India. The act provides for the regulation of banking and credit in India and gives the RBI the authority to issue licenses to banks and regulate their activities.
- Banking Regulation Act, 1949: This act provides for the regulation and supervision of banking companies in India. It sets out the rules for the establishment and operation of banks, their capital requirements, and the powers of the RBI to inspect and supervise their activities. The act also provides for the appointment of the Banking Ombudsman, who is responsible for resolving complaints against banks.
- Negotiable Instruments Act, 1881: This act governs the use and transfer of negotiable instruments such as cheques, promissory notes, and bills of exchange. It provides for the rights and obligations of parties to these instruments and sets out the rules for their payment and discharge.
- Securities and Exchange Board of India Act, 1992: This act provides for the regulation of securities markets in India and the protection of the interests of investors in these markets. It gives the Securities and Exchange Board of India (SEBI) the power to regulate and supervise the activities of stock exchanges, brokers, and other market intermediaries.
- Prevention of Money Laundering Act, 2002: This act provides for the prevention of money laundering and the financing of terrorism in India. It requires banks and other financial institutions to carry out customer due diligence and maintain records of transactions to prevent the use of the financial system for illegal activities.

== Securities market regulation ==
Securities market regulation in India is primarily overseen by the Securities and Exchange Board of India (SEBI), which is responsible for regulating the securities markets in the country. SEBI has issued various regulations and guidelines to ensure that the securities markets operate in a fair, transparent, and efficient manner. Here are some key aspects of securities market regulation in India:

- Investor Protection: SEBI's primary objective is to protect the interests of investors in the securities markets. It has issued various regulations to ensure that investors have access to accurate and timely information about securities, and that they are protected from fraudulent and unfair practices. For example, SEBI has issued regulations on insider trading, market manipulation, and disclosure requirements for listed companies.
- Market Operations: SEBI regulates the operations of the securities markets in India, including stock exchanges, brokers, and other market intermediaries. It has issued regulations on the conduct of brokers and intermediaries, including rules on capital adequacy, registration requirements, and compliance standards.
- Listing Requirements: SEBI has issued regulations on listing requirements for companies that wish to list their securities on Indian stock exchanges. These regulations prescribe disclosure requirements, eligibility criteria, and other conditions that must be met by companies seeking to list their securities.
- Disclosure Requirements: SEBI has issued regulations on disclosure requirements for listed companies, which prescribe the information that must be disclosed by companies to investors and the public. These regulations cover areas such as financial statements, management discussion and analysis, and related party transactions.
- Investor Education: SEBI is also responsible for investor education and awareness programs, aimed at educating investors about the securities markets and the risks and opportunities associated with investing in securities.
- Enforcement: SEBI has the power to investigate and take enforcement action against violations of securities laws and regulations. It can impose fines and other penalties on market participants who violate regulations, and can take legal action against offenders.

=== Securities markets regulation acts ===
The securities markets in India are regulated by several acts, rules, and regulations. Here are some of the key securities market acts in India:

- Securities and Exchange Board of India Act, 1992: This is the primary legislation governing the securities markets in India. It established the Securities and Exchange Board of India (SEBI) as the regulator for the securities markets and gave it powers to regulate and develop the securities markets, protect the interests of investors, and promote investor education.
- Securities Contracts (Regulation) Act, 1956: This act regulates the trading of securities in India and governs the functioning of stock exchanges, brokers, and other intermediaries in the securities markets. It defines the types of securities that can be traded in India, sets out the rules for the conduct of trading, and provides for the regulation and registration of stock exchanges and other market intermediaries.
- Depositories Act, 1996: This act provides for the establishment of depositories in India and governs the transfer and registration of securities in electronic form. It enables investors to hold securities in dematerialized form and facilitates faster and more efficient settlement of trades.
- Securities Contracts (Regulation) Rules, 1957: These are the rules made under the Securities Contracts (Regulation) Act, 1956, and provide for the regulation of stock exchanges, brokers, and other intermediaries in the securities markets. The rules cover areas such as eligibility criteria for listing on stock exchanges, margin requirements, and the conduct of brokers and intermediaries.
- SEBI (Listing Obligations and Disclosure Requirements) Regulations, 2015: These regulations prescribe the listing requirements for companies that wish to list their securities on Indian stock exchanges. They set out the eligibility criteria, disclosure requirements, and other conditions that must be met by companies seeking to list their securities.
- SEBI (Prohibition of Insider Trading) Regulations, 2015: These regulations prohibit insider trading in securities and prescribe the rules for the prevention of insider trading. They require companies to maintain a list of insiders and to disclose certain information to the stock exchanges and the public.
- SEBI (Substantial Acquisition of Shares and Takeovers) Regulations, 2011: These regulations govern the acquisition of shares and takeovers of listed companies in India. They require acquirers to make certain disclosures and offer an open offer to minority shareholders in case of a change in control of a listed company.

== Bullion regulation ==
Bullion regulation in India is overseen by the government and various regulatory bodies. Bullion refers to precious metals such as gold and silver, which are often used as a store of value and a hedge against inflation.

Here are some key aspects of bullion regulation in India:

- Import and Export: The import and export of bullion in India is regulated by the Directorate General of Foreign Trade (DGFT) under the Ministry of Commerce and Industry. Importers and exporters of bullion must obtain relevant licenses and comply with various regulations and guidelines issued by the government.
- Taxation: Bullion is subject to various taxes in India, including customs duty, excise duty, and value-added tax (VAT). The government may also impose a tax on the sale or transfer of bullion, depending on the transaction size and other factors.
- Hallmarking: The Bureau of Indian Standards (BIS) is responsible for hallmarking of gold and silver in India. Hallmarking is a process by which the purity and quality of bullion are verified and certified by an independent agency. Hallmarked bullion carries a BIS mark, which indicates the purity and quality of the metal.
- Trading: Bullion trading in India is primarily conducted through spot and futures markets. The India International Bullion Exchange (IIBX), National Commodity and Derivatives Exchange (NCDEX) and Multi Commodity Exchange (MCX) are the three major exchanges for trading in bullion futures contracts in India. These exchanges are regulated by the Securities and Exchange Board of India (SEBI) and International Financial Services Centres Authority(IFSCA).
- Investment: Bullion is a popular investment option in India, and investors can purchase physical bullion or invest in bullion-based financial products such as exchange-traded funds (ETFs) or mutual funds. The regulation of bullion-based financial products falls under the purview of the Securities and Exchange Board of India (SEBI).

=== Bullion regulation acts ===
Bullion regulation in India is governed by various Acts and regulations. Here are some of the key Acts and regulations that are relevant to bullion regulation in India:

- IFSC Authority (Bullion Exchange) Regulations, 2020: The act governs India International Bullion Exchange(IIBX) in International Financial Services Centre(IFSC).
- Foreign Trade (Development and Regulation) Act, 1992: This Act regulates the import and export of goods in India, including bullion. The Directorate General of Foreign Trade (DGFT) under the Ministry of Commerce and Industry is responsible for issuing licenses for the import and export of bullion.
- Bureau of Indian Standards Act, 2016: This Act empowers the Bureau of Indian Standards (BIS) to regulate the quality and standard of goods in India, including bullion. The BIS is responsible for hallmarking of gold and silver in India.
- Central Excise Act, 1944: This Act levies excise duty on the manufacture and production of goods in India, including bullion. Excise duty is currently not applicable on gold and silver bullion in India.
- Customs Act, 1962: This Act regulates the import and export of goods in India, including bullion. The Act specifies the procedures for clearance of imported and exported goods, including bullion.
- Securities Contracts (Regulation) Act, 1956: This Act regulates the securities market in India, including the trading of bullion futures contracts on commodity exchanges.
- Prevention of Money Laundering Act, 2002: This Act aims to prevent money laundering and terrorism financing in India, including in the bullion industry. Bullion dealers and traders are required to comply with various anti-money laundering (AML) and know-your-customer (KYC) regulations.

== Financial services licenses ==
In India, financial services licenses are issued by the Reserve Bank of India (RBI) and the Securities and Exchange Board of India (SEBI) depending on the type of financial activity being conducted. Here are some financial services licenses in India:

1. Banking License: Banks in India are regulated by the Reserve Bank of India (RBI) under the Banking Regulation Act, 1949. The RBI is responsible for issuing banking licenses in India, and banks are classified into different categories based on their ownership, size, and type of operations. Scheduled banks are those that are included in the Second Schedule of the RBI Act and are eligible for certain privileges such as borrowing from the RBI. Non-scheduled banks are those that are not included in the Second Schedule of the RBI Act. Public sector banks are those that are owned by the government of India, while private sector banks are those that are owned by private individuals or entities. Foreign banks are those that have a presence in India but are headquartered outside the country. Cooperative banks are those that are owned and operated by cooperatives.
2. Non-Banking Financial Company (NBFC) License: NBFCs are financial institutions that provide various financial services such as lending, investment, and deposit-taking, but are not licensed to accept demand deposits. The RBI is responsible for issuing NBFC licenses in India, and NBFCs are classified into different categories based on their activities. Systemically Important NBFCs (SI-NBFCs) are those that have a balance sheet size of over Rs. 500 crore or accept public funds, while Non-Systemically Important NBFCs (NSI-NBFCs) are those that do not meet these criteria.
3. Insurance License: The Insurance Regulatory and Development Authority of India (IRDAI) is responsible for issuing licenses for insurance companies in India. Insurance companies can operate in different categories such as life insurance, general insurance, and health insurance. Life insurance companies offer various types of life insurance policies such as term insurance, endowment policies, and unit-linked insurance plans (ULIPs). General insurance companies offer various types of non-life insurance policies such as motor insurance, home insurance, and travel insurance. Health insurance companies offer various types of health insurance policies such as individual health insurance, family floater health insurance, and critical illness insurance.
4. Mutual Fund License: SEBI is responsible for regulating mutual funds in India and issuing licenses to mutual fund companies. Mutual fund companies are allowed to operate different types of funds such as equity funds, debt funds, and hybrid funds. Equity funds invest primarily in stocks, debt funds invest primarily in bonds, while hybrid funds invest in a combination of stocks and bonds.
5. Stock Broker License: SEBI also issues licenses to stock brokers in India. Stock brokers are intermediaries that facilitate buying and selling of securities on behalf of clients on stock exchanges in India. Stock brokers can operate in different categories such as full-service brokers and discount brokers.
6. Depository Participant License: SEBI also issues licenses to depository participants in India. Depository participants are intermediaries that offer services related to holding and trading of securities in electronic form through a depository system. Depository participants can operate in different categories such as NSDL and CDSL.

== See also ==
- Finance in India
- Reserve Bank of India
- Indian company law
- Economy of India
- Ministry of Finance (India)
- Enforcement Directorate
- Financial technology in India
- List of regulators in India
- Indian stock exchange
- Income Tax Department
- Financial Intelligence Unit (India)
- Insolvency and Bankruptcy Board of India

== Sources ==
The information for the above points was gathered from various sources, including:

- Reserve Bank of India: Official website
- Securities and Exchange Board of India: Official website
- Ministry of Finance, Government of India: Official website
- Insurance Regulatory and Development Authority: Official website
- Pension Fund Regulatory and Development Authority: Official website
- National Stock Exchange of India: Official website
- International Financial Services Centre Authority: Official website

== Journals and Further reading ==
- Journal of Banking Regulation: link
- Indian Journal of Finance: link
- Finance India: link
- Economic and Political Weekly: link
- Financial sector regulation in India: Link
- The status of financial inclusion, regulation, and education in India: link
- Financial Regulation in India by Jayant Verma and Sumit Agarwal
- Financial Regulation: Changing Dynamics by Rajesh Chakrabarti and T.T. Ram Mohan
- Financial Markets and Institutions in India by T.R. Bhat
- Banking Regulation in India by M. L. Tannan
- Indian Financial System by Bharati V. Pathak
