= List of regulators in India =

Regulators in India are statutory authorities, government agencies, tribunals and other specialised institutions established to regulate, supervise and develop specific sectors of the Indian economy and public life. They are responsible for maintaining orderly markets, protecting consumers and investors, enforcing laws and standards, promoting fair competition, ensuring safety and transparency, and supporting the long-term development of their respective sectors. Depending on their legal mandate, Indian regulators may exercise powers relating to licensing, registration, supervision, inspection, standard-setting, tariff determination, investigation, enforcement and adjudication.

India has a diverse regulatory framework covering sectors such as banking, securities markets, insurance, pensions, telecommunications, electricity, food safety, aviation, environmental protection, corporate affairs, mining, nuclear safety and warehousing. Important examples include the Reserve Bank of India (RBI), Securities and Exchange Board of India (SEBI), Insurance Regulatory and Development Authority of India (IRDAI), Pension Fund Regulatory and Development Authority (PFRDA), Telecom Regulatory Authority of India (TRAI), Competition Commission of India (CCI), Food Safety and Standards Authority of India (FSSAI) and Bureau of Indian Standards (BIS).

The regulatory framework is not uniform across all sectors. Some bodies, such as RBI, SEBI, IRDAI and PFRDA, function as specialised sectoral regulators, while others are development institutions, statutory authorities, professional bodies or specialised tribunals. Institutions such as the National Bank for Agriculture and Rural Development (NABARD), Small Industries Development Bank of India (SIDBI) and National Housing Bank (NHB), for example, primarily perform development and financial functions rather than serving as conventional regulators. Similarly, the National Green Tribunal (NGT) performs a specialised judicial function in environmental matters. Consequently, the term "regulator" in the Indian context encompasses a range of institutional arrangements with different statutory powers, responsibilities and degrees of autonomy.

== Indian Regulators, Authorities and Related Institutions ==
The following classification distinguishes between regulators, financial and development institutions, government authorities, tribunals, professional bodies, industry associations and export-promotion organisations. Not all of the organisations listed below are regulators.

=== A. Major Regulators, Authorities and Statutory Bodies ===
No.	Regulator / Authority	Sector	Parent Ministry / Department	Established	Legal / Statute	Main Functions
1	Reserve Bank of India (RBI)	Banking, monetary policy, foreign exchange and payments	Ministry of Finance – Department of Financial Services	1 April 1935	RBI Act, 1934	Monetary policy; banking regulation and supervision; currency issuance; foreign-exchange management; payment systems; banker to the Government and banks.
2	Securities and Exchange Board of India (SEBI)	Securities / capital markets	Ministry of Finance – Department of Economic Affairs	1988; statutory status in 1992	SEBI Act, 1992	Regulates securities markets; protects investors; regulates intermediaries, stock exchanges, mutual funds and other market participants; promotes market development.
3	Insurance Regulatory and Development Authority of India (IRDAI)	Insurance and reinsurance	Ministry of Finance – Department of Financial Services	1999	IRDA Act, 1999	Registration and regulation of insurers; policyholder protection; supervision of insurance and reinsurance; orderly development of the insurance sector.
4	Pension Fund Regulatory and Development Authority (PFRDA)	Pension / NPS	Ministry of Finance – Department of Financial Services	2003; statutory status in 2014	PFRDA Act, 2013	Regulates pension funds and NPS; protects subscribers; regulates intermediaries; promotes pension-sector development.
5	International Financial Services Centres Authority (IFSCA)	International financial services / GIFT IFSC	Ministry of Finance – Department of Economic Affairs	2020	International Financial Services Centres Authority Act, 2019	Unified regulator for financial products, financial services and financial institutions in International Financial Services Centres in India; promotes and develops India's international financial-services centres.
6	Insolvency and Bankruptcy Board of India (IBBI)	Insolvency and bankruptcy	Ministry of Corporate Affairs	1 October 2016	Insolvency and Bankruptcy Code, 2016	Regulates insolvency professionals, professional agencies and information utilities; frames regulations for insolvency and liquidation processes; supervision and enforcement.
7	Competition Commission of India (CCI)	Competition / antitrust	Ministry of Corporate Affairs	2003	Competition Act, 2002	Prevents anti-competitive agreements; checks abuse of dominant position; regulates combinations and mergers; competition advocacy.
8	Telecom Regulatory Authority of India (TRAI)	Telecommunications	Ministry of Communications – Department of Telecommunications	20 February 1997	TRAI Act, 1997	Telecom regulation; tariffs; interconnection; quality of service; recommendations to Government; promotion of fair competition.
9	Food Safety and Standards Authority of India (FSSAI)	Food safety	Ministry of Health and Family Welfare	2008	Food Safety and Standards Act, 2006	Sets food standards; regulates food manufacture, storage, distribution, sale and import; coordinates food-safety enforcement.
10	Bureau of Indian Standards (BIS)	Standards, certification and quality	Ministry of Consumer Affairs, Food and Public Distribution – Department of Consumer Affairs	1986	BIS Act, 2016	Formulates Indian Standards; conformity assessment; product certification; testing; hallmarking; quality and safety standards.
11	Central Electricity Regulatory Commission (CERC)	Electricity / power	Ministry of Power	25 July 1998	Electricity Act, 2003	Regulates inter-State electricity transmission and trading; tariff regulation; licensing; advises on electricity policy.
12	Airports Economic Regulatory Authority of India (AERA)	Airport economic regulation	Ministry of Civil Aviation	12 May 2009	AERA Act, 2008	Determines aeronautical tariffs and airport charges at major airports; regulates development fees and passenger service fees; monitors performance standards.
13	Warehousing Development and Regulatory Authority (WDRA)	Warehousing / warehouse receipts	Ministry of Consumer Affairs, Food and Public Distribution – Department of Food and Public Distribution	2010	Warehousing (Development and Regulation) Act, 2007	Registers and regulates warehouses; implements the Negotiable Warehouse Receipt system; promotes scientific warehousing and warehouse finance.
14	Atomic Energy Regulatory Board (AERB)	Nuclear and radiation safety	Department of Atomic Energy	15 November 1983	Atomic Energy Act, 1962 and related government orders	Nuclear and radiation safety standards; authorisations; inspections; regulatory compliance; radiological and industrial safety.
15	Directorate General of Mines Safety (DGMS)	Mining safety	Ministry of Labour and Employment	1902	Mines Act, 1952 and allied legislation	Occupational safety, health and welfare in mines; inspections; enforcement of mine-safety legislation.
16	Central Board of Film Certification (CBFC)	Film certification	Ministry of Information and Broadcasting	1952	Cinematograph Act, 1952	Examines and certifies films for public exhibition; applies film-certification guidelines and categories.
17	National Highways Authority of India (NHAI)	National highways	Ministry of Road Transport and Highways	1988	NHAI Act, 1988	Development, maintenance and management of National Highways; implementation of highway projects; concession management.
18	Inland Waterways Authority of India (IWAI)	Inland waterways	Ministry of Ports, Shipping and Waterways	27 October 1986	Inland Waterways Authority of India Act, 1985	Development and regulation of national waterways; fairway development; navigation infrastructure; pilotage; hydrographic surveys.
19	National Green Tribunal (NGT)	Environmental protection and environmental justice	Ministry of Environment, Forest and Climate Change	18 October 2010	National Green Tribunal Act, 2010	Adjudicates civil cases involving substantial environmental questions; environmental protection; compensation and restitution for environmental damage.
20	Employees' Provident Fund Organisation (EPFO)	Provident fund / social security	Ministry of Labour and Employment	1952	Employees' Provident Funds and Miscellaneous Provisions Act, 1952	Administers EPF, EPS and EDLI schemes; manages provident-fund contributions, claims and social-security benefits.
21	Registrar of Companies (RoC)	Corporate registration and compliance	Ministry of Corporate Affairs	Under Companies legislation	Companies Act	Company and LLP incorporation and registration; maintains statutory records; receives filings; conducts inspections; enforces corporate-law requirements.

=== B. Government Financial and Development Institutions ===
These institutions should not all be classified as regulators. They primarily perform financial, developmental, promotional or supervisory functions.

No.	Institution	Sector	Parent Ministry / Department	Established	Type	Main Functions
1	National Bank for Agriculture and Rural Development (NABARD)	Agriculture and rural development finance	Ministry of Finance – Department of Financial Services	12 July 1982	Development financial institution	Refinance to rural financial institutions; rural infrastructure finance; agricultural and rural credit planning; supervision of Regional Rural Banks and cooperative banks; rural development and financial inclusion.
2	Small Industries Development Bank of India (SIDBI)	MSME finance	Ministry of Finance – Department of Financial Services	2 April 1990	Development financial institution	Promotion, financing and development of micro, small and medium enterprises; direct and indirect finance; coordination of institutions involved in MSME finance.
3	National Housing Bank (NHB)	Housing finance	Ministry of Finance – Department of Financial Services	9 July 1988	Development financial institution / supervisory institution	Housing-sector development; financing and promotion of housing finance; supervision of housing finance companies. RBI is the regulator of HFCs.
4	Financial Stability and Development Council (FSDC)	Financial-system stability and development	Ministry of Finance – Department of Economic Affairs	30 December 2010	Financial-sector coordination body	Financial-stability monitoring; macro-prudential supervision; inter-regulatory coordination; financial-sector development; financial literacy and inclusion.

=== C. Industry Associations, Self-Regulatory Bodies and Export Promotion Organisations ===
These organisations generally do not have the same statutory regulatory status as bodies such as RBI, SEBI, TRAI or IRDAI.

No.	Organisation	Sector	Type	Government / Ministry Link	Main Functions
1	Advertising Standards Council of India (ASCI)	Advertising	Voluntary self-regulatory industry body	Independent industry body	Self-regulation of advertising; complaints against misleading or offensive advertisements; advertising standards and codes.
2	Association of Mutual Funds in India (AMFI)	Mutual funds	Industry association	Independent industry body; works with SEBI	Represents the mutual-fund industry; promotes professional and ethical standards; investor awareness; industry coordination. SEBI remains the regulator.
3	Board of Control for Cricket in India (BCCI)	Cricket / sports	Autonomous sports association	No parent ministry	Governs and promotes cricket in India; organises domestic and international cricket; manages Indian cricket teams and competitions.
4	Engineering Export Promotion Council of India (EEPC India)	Engineering exports	Export Promotion Council	Ministry of Commerce and Industry – Department of Commerce	Promotes engineering exports; trade fairs; market development; exporter support; policy representation.
5	Express Industry Council of India (EICI)	Express / courier industry	Industry association	Independent industry body	Represents the express-delivery and courier industry; policy advocacy; industry development and facilitation.
6	Federation of Indian Export Organisations (FIEO)	Exports / international trade	Export-promotion organisation	Ministry of Commerce and Industry	Represents export-promotion organisations; exporter representation; trade facilitation; policy interface; international trade promotion.
7	Indian National Shipowners' Association (INSA)	Shipping	Industry association	Independent industry body; government policy interface	Represents Indian shipowners; shipping-policy advocacy; industry coordination and development.
8	Indian Chemical Council (ICC)	Chemicals	Industry association	Independent industry body	Represents the chemical industry; policy advocacy; safety; sustainability; standards; industry development.
9	Indian Stainless Steel Development Association (ISSDA)	Stainless steel	Industry association	Independent industry body	Promotes stainless-steel applications; industry development; technical knowledge; standards and market development.
10	Manufacturers' Association for Information Technology (MAIT)	Electronics / IT hardware	Industry association	Independent industry body	Represents the electronics and IT-hardware industry; policy advocacy; industry development; government interface.
11	National Association of Software and Service Companies (NASSCOM)	IT / BPM / technology services	Industry association	Independent industry body	Represents the technology and IT-BPM sector; policy advocacy; research; skills development; global-market development.
12	Organisation of Plastic Processors of India (OPPI)	Plastics processing	Industry association	Independent industry body	Represents the plastic-processing industry; policy advocacy; technology and industry development.
13	Project Exports Promotion Council of India (PEPC / Project EPC)	Project exports / engineering and construction	Export Promotion Council	Ministry of Commerce and Industry / Foreign Trade Policy ecosystem	Promotes overseas project exports; provides information, guidance and support to Indian EPC contractors and consultants.

=== D. Professional Statutory Bodies ===
No.	Organisation	Abbreviation	Sector	Parent Ministry / Department	Type	Main Functions
1	Institute of Chartered Accountants of India	ICAI	Chartered accountancy	Ministry of Corporate Affairs	Statutory professional body	Regulates and develops the Chartered Accountancy profession; education; examinations; professional standards; discipline.
2	Institute of Cost Accountants of India	ICMAI	Cost and management accountancy	Ministry of Corporate Affairs	Statutory professional body	Regulates and develops the cost-accountancy profession; education; examinations; standards; professional discipline.

== See also ==
- Government agencies of India
- Financial regulation in India
