= Narasimham Committee =

Indian government committees on the banking system

Narsimham Committee refers to two committees established by the Government of India in its first decade of economic liberalisation under the chairmanship of M. Narasimham. The first Committee, officially known as the Committee on Financial System (CFS), was established in August 1991. The report of the CSF was submitted to the Finance Minister in November 1991, and tabled in the Parliament of India on 17 December 1991.The second committee, officially called, Committee on Banking Reforms (CBR) was eatablished in December 1997, and submitted its report in April 1998.

== Background ==
During the decades of the 60s and the 70s, India nationalised most of its banks. This culminated with the balance of payments crisis of the Indian economy where India had to airlift gold to International Monetary Fund (IMF) to loan money to meet its financial obligations. This event called into question the previous banking policies of India and triggered the era of economic liberalization in India in 1991.

Given the rigidities and weaknesses had made serious inroads into the Indian banking system by the late 1980s, the Government of India, post-crisis, took several steps to remodel the country's financial system. The banking sector, handling 80% of the flow of money in the economy, needed serious reforms to make it internationally reputable, accelerate the pace of reforms and develop it into a constructive usher of an efficient, vibrant and competitive economy by adequately supporting the country's financial needs.

In the light of these requirements, two expert Committees were set up in 1990s under the chairmanship of M. Narasimham, former Reserve Bank of India governor which are widely credited for spearheading the financial sector reform in India.

The first Narasimhan Committee (Committee on the Financial System – CFS) was appointed by Manmohan Singh as India's Finance Minister on 14 August 1991, and the second one (Committee on Banking Sector Reforms) was appointed by P.Chidambaram as Finance Minister in December 1997. Subsequently, the first one widely came to be known as the Narasimham Committee-I (1991) and the second one as Narasimham-II Committee (1998).

The purpose of the Narasimham-I Committee was to study all aspects relating to the structure, organisation, functions and procedures of the financial systems and to recommend improvements in their efficiency and productivity. The Committee submitted its report to the Finance Minister in November 1991 which was tabled in Parliament on 17 December 1991.

The Narasimham-II Committee was tasked with the progress review of the implementation of the banking reforms since 1992 with the aim of further strengthening the financial institutions of India. It focussed on issues like size of banks and capital adequacy ratio among other things. M. Narasimham, chairman, submitted the report of the Committee on Banking Sector Reforms (Committee-II) to the Finance Minister Yashwant Sinha in April 1998.

== Recommendations of the Committee ==
The 1998 report of the committee to the GOI made the following major recommendations:

=== Autonomy in Banking ===
Greater autonomy was proposed for the public sector banks in order for them to function with equivalent professionalism as their international counterparts. For this the panel recommended that recruitment procedures, training and remuneration policies of public sector banks be brought in line with the best-market-practices of professional banking systems. It also recommended the RBI relinquish its seats on the board of directors of these banks. The committee further added that given that the government nominees to the board of banks are often members of parliament, politicians, bureaucrats, etc., they often interfere in the day-to-day operations of the bank in the form of the behest-lending. As such the committee recommended a review of functions of banks boards with a view to make them responsible for enhancing shareholder value through formulation of corporate strategy and reduction of the government equity.

To implement this, criteria for autonomous status were identified by March 1999 (among other implementation measures) and 17 banks were considered eligible for autonomy. But some recommendations like reduction in Government's equity to 33%, the issue of greater professionalism and independence of the board of directors of public sector banks is still awaiting Government follow-through and implementation.

=== Reform in the role of RBI ===
First, the committee recommended that the RBI withdraw from the 91-day treasury bills market and that interbank call money and term money markets be restricted to banks and primary dealers. Second, the Committee proposed a segregation of the roles of RBI as a regulator of banks and owner of bank. It observed that "The Reserve Bank as a regulator of the monetary system should not be the owner of a bank in view of a possible conflict of interest". As such, it highlighted that RBI's role of effective supervision was not adequate and wanted it to divest its holdings in banks and financial institutions.

Pursuant to the recommendations, the RBI introduced a Liquidity Adjustment Facility (LAF) operated through repo and reverse repos to set a corridor for money market interest rates. To begin with, in April 1999, an Interim Liquidity Adjustment Facility (ILAF) was introduced pending further upgradation in technology and legal/procedural changes to facilitate electronic transfer. As for the second recommendation, the RBI decided to transfer its respective shareholdings of public banks like State Bank of India (SBI), National Housing Bank (NHB) and National Bank for Agriculture and Rural Development (NABARD) to GOI. Subsequently, in 2007–08, GOI decided to acquire entire stake of RBI in SBI, NHB and NABARD. Of these, the terms of sale for SBI were finalised in 2007–08 itself.

=== Stronger banking system ===
The Committee recommended for merger of large Indian banks to make them strong enough for supporting international trade. It recommended a three tier banking structure in India through establishment of three large banks with international presence, eight to ten national banks and a large number of regional and local banks. This proposal had been severely criticized by the RBI employees union. The Committee recommended the use of mergers to build the size and strength of operations for each bank. However, it cautioned that large banks should merge only with banks of equivalent size and not with weaker banks, which should be closed down if unable to revitalize themselves. Given the large percentage of non-performing assets for weaker banks, some as high as 20% of their total assets, the concept of "narrow banking" was proposed to assist in their rehabilitation.

There were a string of mergers in banks of India during the late 90s and early 2000s, encouraged strongly by the Government of India in line with the committee's recommendations. However, the recommended degree of consolidation is still awaiting sufficient government impetus.

=== Non-performing assets ===
Non-performing assets had been the single largest cause of irritation of the banking sector of India. Earlier the Narasimham Committee-I had broadly concluded that the main reason for the reduced profitability of the commercial banks in India was the priority sector lending. The committee had highlighted that 'priority sector lending' was leading to the buildup of non-performing assets of the banks and thus it recommended it to be phased out. Subsequently, the Narasimham Committee-II also highlighted the need for 'zero' non-performing assets for all Indian banks with International presence. The 1998 report further blamed poor credit decisions, behest-lending and cyclical economic factors among other reasons for the buildup of the non-performing assets of these banks to uncomfortably high levels. The Committee recommended creation of Asset Reconstruction Funds or Asset Reconstruction Companies to take over the bad debts of banks, allowing them to start on a clean-slate. The option of re-capitalization through budgetary provisions was ruled out. Overall the committee wanted a proper system to identify and classify NPAs, NPAs to be brought down to 3% by 2002 and for an independent loan review mechanism for improved management of loan portfolios. The committee's recommendations led to introduction of a new legislation which was subsequently implemented as the Securitization and Reconstruction of Financial Assets and Enforcement of Security Interest Act, 2002 and came into force with effect from 21 June 2002.

=== Capital adequacy and tightening of provisioning norms ===
To improve the inherent strength of the Indian banking system the committee recommended that the Government should raise the prescribed capital adequacy norms. This would also improve their risk taking ability. The committee targeted raising the capital adequacy ratio to 9% by 2000 and 10% by 2002 and have penal provisions for banks that fail to meet these requirements. For asset classification, the Committee recommended a mandatory 1% in case of standard assets and for the accrual of interest income to be done every 90 days instead of 180 days.

To implement these recommendations, the RBI in Oct 1998, initiated the second phase of financial sector reforms by raising the banks' capital adequacy ratio by 1% and tightening the prudential norms for provisioning and asset classification in a phased manner on the lines of the Narasimham Committee-II report. The RBI targeted to bring the capital adequacy ratio to 9% by March 2001. The mid-term Review of the Monetary and Credit Policy of RBI announced another series of reforms, in line with the recommendations with the committee, in October 1999.

=== Entry of foreign banks ===
The committee suggested that the foreign banks seeking to set up business in India should have a minimum start-up capital of $25 million as against the existing requirement of $10 million. It said that foreign banks can be allowed to set up subsidiaries and joint ventures that should be treated on a par with private banks.

== Implementation of recommendations ==
In 1998, RBI Governor Bimal Jalan informed the banks that the RBI had a three to four-year perspective on the implementation of the committee's recommendations. Based on the other recommendations of the committee, the concept of a universal bank was discussed by the RBI and finally ICICI bank became the first universal bank of India. The RBI published an "Actions Taken on the Recommendations" report on 31 October 2001 on its own website. Most of the recommendations of the Committee have been acted upon (as discussed above) although some major recommendations are still awaiting action from the Government of India.

== Criticism ==
There were protests by employee unions of banks in India against the report. The Union of RBI employees made a strong protest against the Narasimham II Report. There were other plans by the United Forum of Bank Unions (UFBU), representing about 1.3 million bank employees in India, to meet in Delhi and to work out a plan of action in the wake of the Narasimham Committee report on banking reforms. The committee was also criticized in some quarters as "anti-poor". According to some, the committees failed to recommend measures for faster alleviation of poverty in India by generating new employment. This caused some suffering to small borrowers (both individuals and businesses in tiny, micro and small sectors).

== Reception ==
Initially, the recommendations were well received in all quarters, including the Planning Commission of India leading to successful implementation of most of its recommendations. During the 2008 financial crisis, performance of the Indian banking sector was far better than its international counterparts. This was also credited to the successful implementation of the recommendations of the Narasimham Committee-II with particular reference to the capital adequacy norms and the re-capitalization of the public sector banks. The impact of the two committees has been so significant that elite politicians and financial sectors professionals have been discussing these reports for more than a decade since their first submission applauding their positive contribution
