= Kundan Group =

Company headquartered in New Delhi, India

Kundan Group was established in 1971 and is headquartered in New Delhi, India. The company has a multi-business portfolio inclusive of gold refinery, cosmetics, chemicals, polymers, agro-commodities, precious metals, petroleum products, green energy, and the import of bullion and pharmaceutical items.

== History ==
Pradeep Garg is the founder and the chairman of Kundan Group. He founded the company as a small scale unit and expanded it into a multi-faceted business in over four decades. The board of directors includes Udit Garg, Vidit Garg, and Deepak Gupta.

In 1990, Kundan Group became accredited as the first star export house in India. It became the Direct Clearing member of National Commodities and Derivatives Exchange (NCDEX) and Multi Commodity Exchange (MCX). It was recognized as the Premier Trading House, the highest accreditation by the Government of India in 2009. Five years later, in 2014, it became recognized as the largest private gold refinery in India, followed by a National Accreditation Board for Testing and Calibration Laboratories (NABL) accreditation for its Gold refinery testing lab.

Kundan Group headquarter is in New Delhi, India. With a reported turnover of 4 billion USD, it is recognized as a Four Star Trading House by the Government of India, and it is an ISO 9001 certified company.

== Companies ==
Kundan Group is the umbrella company that operates various other companies:

=== Gold Refinery ===
Established in 2011, it is the largest private sector gold refinery in India. The company mines and produces gold and silver bullion through globally adopted refining technologies, inclusive of testing methods such as precise assay, fire assay, and XRF machine analysis. The gold refinery has NABL accreditation and BIS Hallmark. In 2020, Kundan Gold Refinery's gold bars were accepted for delivery on the National Stock Exchange (NSE) platform.

=== Bullion ===
Bullion trading and production is one of Kundan Group's original business lines, encompassing both the import of bullion and its domestic manufacture through Kundan Gold Refinery (above), including coins and bars up to 99.99% purity under NABL and BIS Hallmark certification.

=== Minting ===
The refinery is engaged in refining, designing, and manufacturing of precious metals in the form of coins and bars with purity up to 99.99%. It is the largest private gold refinery in India; it is accredited with National Accreditation Board for Testing and Calibration Laboratories (NABL) and with BIS Hallmark to ensure 100% authenticity to coins and bars.

=== Kundan Green Energy ===
Kundan Green Energy Private Limited was incorporated in July 2017 as the group's renewable energy business. The company develops hydropower, solar power, waste-to-energy and BESS projects in India, with commissioned projects in Himachal Pradesh, Uttarakhand, Sikkim, Rajasthan, Maharashtra, and Gujarat.

=== Concentrates ===
Kundan Concentrates operates an ore-processing plant in Kachchh, Gujarat, spanning approximately 100 acres, with a processing capacity described by the company as exceeding 3,000 tons per month. The facility recovers metals including gold, copper, silver, platinum, palladium, and rhodium from ore concentrates, supported by an in-house NABL-accredited laboratory. The unit holds a licence from the National Accreditation Board for Education and Training (NABET), with approval from India's Ministry of Mines.

=== Mining ===
The group's mining interests are held through Kundan Minerals & Metals Limited, which is engaged in the prospecting, exploration, and mining of minerals and metals, including gold and graphite. Its wholly owned subsidiary, Kundan Gold Mines Private Limited, was formed to expand the company's gold mining operations, and the group has also expanded its mining interests internationally through a foreign subsidiary, Kundan Ventures FZCO.

=== Alainne ===
Kundan Group started the Alainne brand in early 2010s, and the products are available on both online and offline retail channels like Flipkart, Amazon, and Paytm. Bollywood actress Tisca Chopra is the brand ambassador of one of their product line, Alainne room fresheners.

=== Rice Mills ===
Established in 1971, Kundan Rice is one of the oldest rice miller and exporter of basmati rice in over 35 countries. The company exports to the major seaports in Europe, Middle East, Africa, and America, and has three rice mills in Panipat, India. The milling capacity is of 20 tons per hour.

=== Zeya ===
In 2019, Kundan Group collaborated with Swarovski to launch Zeya by Kundan, a jewelry brand selling handcrafted gold jewelry made with cubic Zircona from Swarovski.

Kundan Group is also involved in energy, precious metal minting, beauty and personal care, petrochemicals, bullion, and timber verticals.
