= SFMC =

SFMC may refer to:

- The San Francisco Motorcycle Club
- The SIDBI Foundation for Microcredit
- Salesforce Marketing Cloud
- Shanghai First Medical College, a former name of the Shanghai Medical College, Fudan University
