= All India Financial Institutions =

Indian financial regulatory bodies

All India Financial Institutions (AIFI) is a group composed of financial regulatory bodies that play a pivotal role in the financial markets. Also known as "financial instruments", the financial institutions assist in the proper allocation of resources, sourcing from businesses that have a surplus and distributing to others who have deficits - this also assists with ensuring the continued circulation of money in the economy. Possibly of greatest significance, the financial institutions act as an intermediary between borrowers and final lenders, providing safety and liquidity. This process subsequently ensures earnings on the investments and savings involved. In Post-Independence India, people were encouraged to increase savings, a tactic intended to provide funds for investment by the Indian government. However, there was a huge gap between the supply of savings and demand for the investment opportunities in the country.

== List of AIFIs ==
As of 2022, there are five financial regulatory bodies under the jurisdiction of Reserve Bank of India as all-India Financial Institutions:

- Export - Import Bank of India (Exim Bank)
- National Bank for Agriculture and Rural Development (NABARD)
- Small Industries Development Bank of India (SIDBI)
- National Housing Bank (NHB)
- National Bank for Financing Infrastructure and Development (NaBFID)

== Industrial Development Bank of India ==
IDBI is no longer an AIFI and has been converted into a universal bank by the Government of India. The IDBI was established to provide credit for major financial facilities to assist with the industrial development of India. It was established in 1964 by RBI, and was transferred to the government of India in 1976. The government holdings in IDBI, after the IPO, is 51.4%. By the end of September 2004, the IDBI asset base was Rs. 36850 crore.

=== Diversification of activities of IDBI ===
Since 1990, IDBI has set up a number of institutes, including:

- Small Industries Development Bank of India (SIDBI) in 1990
- IDBI Investment Management Company (IIMCO) in 1994
- IDBI Capital Market Services Ltd. (ICMS) in 1995
- IDBI Bank Ltd.

== State industrial development corporations ==
In 1960, the first state industrial development corporations (SIDC) were established in Bihar. These mainly autonomous bodies are controlled by the state government, who may own a stake in the corporation. There are approximately 29 SIDCs in India.

Their main functions include the promotion of rapid industrialization in India. They mainly work at the grass roots level, providing development in the backward and less frequented parts of India. They offer financial leases and offer guarantees. They also administer the schemes of the central and state governments. The projects and surveys of the industrial potential areas are conducted by them, as well as the evaluation of SEZs.

== Mutual funds ==
The first mutual funds in India were created in 1964 by the Unit Trust of India. In 1987, the leading public sector banks of the country, such as SBI and Canara Bank, set up their mutual funds. It became popular after the 1991 liberalization of the Indian economy.

By the end of 2006, there were around 200 mutual funds schemes in India. The amount of assets managed by the mutual funds grew from Rs. 47,000 crores to Rs. 2,17,707 crores by 31 March 2006. The mutual funds are managed by fund managers for small investors, who often do not have enough information to adequately invest the funds.

=== Organizations of mutual funds companies in India ===
Mutual funds in India have five constituents:

- Sponsors
- Board of trustees or trust
- Asset management company
- Custodian
- Unit holders
