= MV AMET Majesty =

History
- Name: AMET Majesty
- Builder: Dubegion-Normandie S.A
- Launched: 30 January 1975
- Completed: 1975
- Identification: IMO number: 7360198; Callsign: AVKY
- Fate: Scrapped 2013

General characteristics (as built)
- Class & type: Ropax
- Tonnage: 16,546 GRT; 1,995 t DWT
- Length: 153 m (502 ft 0 in)
- Beam: 22 m (72 ft 2 in)
- Draught: 6.2 m (20 ft 4 in)
- Installed power: 4 × SEMT Pielstick 12PC2-2V-400 diesels; combined 17,600 kW (23,600 hp)
- Speed: 21 knots (38.89 km/h; 24.17 mph)
- Capacity: 1,599 passengers; 240 cars
- Notes: for sale

MV AMET Majesty (formerly Arberia, Wasa Queen, Orient Sun, Eurosun, Orient Express, Club Sea, Silja Star, Bore Star) was a car/passenger ferry operating in the Indian Ocean. She was registered with the Academy Of Maritime Education and Training, in Chennai, India as a training ship. The vessel was scrapped on 25 May 2013 at Alang.
