= Central Registry of Securitisation Asset Reconstruction and Security Interest =

Indian security interest registry

Central Registry of Securitisation, Asset Reconstruction and Security Interest of India
- Type: Public sector
- Industry: Financial Infrastructure
- Founded: 11 March 2011
- Headquarters: New Delhi, India
- Area served: India
- Products: Online security interest registry
- Owners: Government of India, National Housing Bank and others
- Website: cersai.org.in

Central Registry of Securitisation, Asset Reconstruction and Security Interest of India (CERSAI) is a central online security interest registry of India. It was primarily created to check fraud in lending against equitable mortgages, in which people would take multiple loans on the same asset from different banks.

It is a registered company under section 8 of the Companies Act, 2013, having its registered office at New Delhi.

CRSARSII is a Registration System under the provisions of Chapter IV of the Securitisation and Reconstruction of Financial Assets and Enforcement of Security Interest Act, 2002. (SRFAESI Act).

== History ==
It was formed under the Chapter IV Securitisation and Reconstruction of Financial Assets and Enforcement of Security Interest Act, 2002 (SRFAESI Act). It was registered as a company under Section 25 of the Companies Act, 1956. CRSARSII became operational on 31-March-2011. 51% of the equity is owned by the government, and the rest is owned equally by National Housing Bank and 10 other public sector banks. The then Chairman of the National Housing bank, R.V. Verma, served as the first acting Registrar, managing director and CEO of CRSARSII, while continuing to hold charge at the National Housing Bank.

== Objectives and functions ==
CRSARSII's was created to maintain a central registry of mortgages, which contains the mortgage taken on a property along with certain details. CRSARSII's mandate was extended in 2012 to start registration of security interests created through assignment of accounts receivables or factoring, through the passage of the Factoring Act, 2012. In January-2016, it's riled were extended even further to allow the CRSARSII to start registration of security interests created on movable and intangible assets, as well as to registration of all other types of mortgages used in India.

== See also ==
- CIBIL, a credit rating company in India
