= PNB Metlife India Insurance Company Limited =

PNB MetLife India Insurance Company Limited
- Type: Private company
- Industry: Life insurance
- Predecessor: MetLife India Insurance Company Private Limited
- Founded: 11 April 2001; 25 years ago
- Key people: Sameer Bansal (managing director and chief executive officer)
- Products: Life-insurance products
- Revenue: ₹14,946 crore (US$ 1.75 bn) (FY 2024–25)
- Total assets: ₹55,045 crore (US$ 6.44 bn) (FY 2024–25)
- Owners: MetLife International Holdings LLC (49.73%); Punjab National Bank (30.00%)
- Website: www.pnbmetlife.com

PNB MetLife India Insurance Company Limited is an Indian life-insurance company headquartered in Mumbai. It is a joint venture between MetLife International Holdings LLC, a subsidiary of the U.S.-based insurer MetLife, and the state-owned Punjab National Bank (PNB). As of 30 September 2025, MetLife International Holdings held 49.73% of the company and PNB held 30.00%; other investors held the remaining shares. It is registered with the Insurance Regulatory and Development Authority of India (IRDAI) as life insurer number 117, its registration dates from 6 August 2001.

For the financial year ended 31 March 2025, PNB MetLife reported total income of ₹14,946 crore, total premium of ₹11,752 crore, assets under management of ₹54,193 crore, and profit after tax of ₹325.35 crore.

== History ==
The company was incorporated in Bengaluru on 11 April 2001 as MetLife India Insurance Company Private Limited. When it began operations in 2001 as MetLife India Insurance Company Private Limited, it was a joint venture. MetLife International held 26%, Pallonji Group held 31%, Jammu & Kashmir Bank held 25%, and other Indian investors held the remaining 18%. Foreign ownership of Indian insurers was capped at 26% when the company began operations in 2001. The limit was subsequently raised to 100% in 2025.

It received its Insurance Regulatory and Development Authority (IRDAI) registration to conduct life-insurance business on 6 August 2001. It became a public limited company in 2007 and was renamed MetLife India Insurance Company Limited in January 2008.

Punjab National Bank (PNB) agreed to acquire a 30% stake in the company in 2012. The company adopted its present name in January 2013 after PNB became a shareholder.

MetLife International Holdings LLC and American Insurance company holds 49.73% of the company and PNB held 30.00% as of 30 September 2025, according to ICRA. MetLife disclosed that it acquired approximately 15% ownership in 2022 and a further approximately 2% in 2024.
