= DCCB =

DCCB may refer to:

- Direcção Central de Combate ao Banditismo (Portugal)
- Direct Current Circuit Breaker
- District Co-operative Central Bank - Cooperative Bank network in India
