= National Housing Bank =

The National Housing Bank may refer to

- National Housing Bank (India) - a government agency in India
- National Housing Bank (England) - a division of Homes England
