= Securities Appellate Tribunal =

Statutory tribunal to hear appeals against the orders of India's financial sector regulator

Agency overview
- Headquarters: India
- Parent agency: Ministry of Law and Justice, Department of Legal Affairs
- Website: sat.gov.in

Securities Appellate Tribunal is an Indian statutory and autonomous body created to hear appeals against the orders of India's main financial regulators. The presiding officer and other members of the Board are elected by the selection committee of the Prime Minister of India. The Securities Appellate Tribunal has jurisdiction over companies operating across India.

== History and objective ==
Securities Appellate Tribunal is formed as a statutory body as per the provisions of Section 15K of the Securities and Exchange Board of India (SEBI) Act, 1992 where orders passed by the Sebi are appealed, heard and resolved.

== Powers ==
Securities Appellate Tribunal hears appeals against the following orders:

- Orders issued by the Insurance Regulatory and Development Authority of India (IRDAI) in relation to cases filed before it.
- Orders issued by the Pension Fund Regulatory and Development Authority (PFRDA) in relation to cases filed before it.
- Orders passed by Securities and Exchange Board of India.

== Jurisdiction ==
The Securities Appellate Tribunal has only one bench which sits in Mumbai and its jurisdiction extends to whole of India.

== Composition ==
The composition of Securities Appellate Tribunal includes Presiding officer, Judicial members and technical members.

The appointment of Presiding officer and other members of Securities Appellate Tribunal is done by a committee headed by Prime Minister of India.

Justice Dinesh Kumar is presiding member of Securities Appellate Tribunal.

== Eligibility for members ==
Following is the eligibility for the Presiding officer or members of Securities Appellate Tribunal.

- Should not have adjudged as insolvent.
- Should not have been convicted of an offence involving moral turpitude.
- Ineligibility due to physical or mental incapacities.
- Possession of financial or any other interest prejudicially affecting the position as Presiding officer or member.
- Abuse of authority or position making his continuation in office prejudicial to public interest.
- In addition any specific issues mentioned in the Act.
