= Liquidity adjustment facility =

Monetary policy

Liquidity adjustment facility (LAF) is a monetary policy tool which allows banks to borrow money through repurchase agreements (repos) that is primarily used by the Reserve Bank of India (RBI).

The LAF is used to aid banks in adjusting the day to day mismatches in liquidity. LAF helps banks to quickly borrow money in case of any emergency or for adjusting in their Statutory Liquidity Ratio (SLR)/Cash Reserve Ratio (CRR) requirements.

The LAF consists of repo (repurchase agreement) and reverses repo operations. The rate charged by Reserve bank of India for this transaction is called the repo rate. Repo operations, therefore, inject liquidity into the system. Reverse repo operation is when RBI borrows money from banks by lending securities. The interest rate paid by RBI in this case is called the reverse repo rate. Reverse repo operation, therefore, absorbs the liquidity in the system. The collateral used for repo and reverse repo operations are Government of India securities. Oil bonds have been also suggested to be included as collateral for liquidity adjustment facility. In LAF, money transaction are done via real-time gross settlement (RTGS), an online money transfer method).

== History ==
The origin of repo rates, one of the components of liquidity adjustment facility, can be traced to as early as 1917 in U.S. financial market when wartime taxes made other sources of lending unattractive. The introduction of the liquidity adjustment facility in India was on the basis of the recommendations of Narasimham Committee on Banking Sector Reforms (1998). In April 1999, an interim LAF was introduced to provide a ceiling and the fixed-rate repos were continued to provide a floor for money market rates. As per the policy measures announced in 2000, the Liquidity Adjustment Facility was introduced with the first stage starting from June 2000 onwards. Subsequent revisions were made in 2001 and 2004. When the scheme was introduced, repo auctions were described for operations that absorbed liquidity from the system and reverse repo actions for operations that injected liquidity into the system. However, in international nomenclature, repo and reverse repo implied the reverse. Hence in October 2004, when the revised scheme of LAF was announced, the decision to follow the international usage of terms was adopted.

Repo and reverse repo rates were announced separately until the monetary policy statement on 3 May 2011. In this monetary policy statement, it has been decided that the reverse repo rate would not be announced separately but will be linked to the repo rate. The reverse repo rate will be 100 basis points below the repo rate. The liquidity adjustment facility corridor, that is the excess of repo rate over reverse repo, has varied between 100 and 300 basis points. The period between April 2001 to March 2004 and June 2008 to early November 2008 saw a broader corridor ranging from 150–250 and 200–300 basis points respectively. From March 2004 to June 2008 the corridor was narrow with the rates ranging from 100–175 basis points. A narrow LAF corridor is reflected from November 2008 onwards. At present, the width of the corridor is 25 basis points. This corridor is used to contain any volatility in short-term interest rates.

== Status ==
The liquidity adjustment facility has emerged as the principal operating instrument for modulating short term liquidity in the economy. Repo rate has become the key policy rate that signals the monetary policy stance of the economy.

== See also ==
- Discount window
- Bank rate
- Fractional-reserve banking
