= Securities Contracts (Regulation) Act, 1956 =

Indian parliament act

The Securities Contracts (Regulation) Act, 1956

Parliament of India
- Long title: An Act to prevent undesirable transactions in securities and to regulate the working of stock exchanges in the country
- Enacted by: Parliament of India
- Enacted: 20 February 1957
- Status: In force

The Securities Contracts (Regulation) Act, 1956 also known as SCRA is an Act of the Parliament of India enacted to prevent undesirable exchanges in securities and to control the working of stock exchange in India. It came into force on 20 February 1957.

== See also ==
- List of acts of the Parliament of India
- Securities and Exchange Board of India Act, 1992
