= Academy of Maritime Education and Training =

Educational institution in Tamil Nadu, India

- Type: Private & Deemed university
- Established: 1992
- Affiliations: All India Council for Technical Education(AICTE), International Association of Maritime Universities (IAMU) Royal Institution of Naval Architects (RINA), University Grants Commission (UGC), Directorate General of Shipping
- Chancellor: J. Ramachandran
- Vice-Chancellor: G. Thiruvasagam
- Students: 3000+
- Location: 135, East Coast Road, Kanathur, Chennai, Chennai, Tamil Nadu, India; 12.854314°N 80.239372°E
- Website: Official Website

Academy of Maritime Education and Training (AMET) is a private Deemed university located in Chennai, Tamil Nadu, India. The institute is dedicated for maritime education and training. It is one of its kind technology oriented institute of higher education in India dedicated for maritime Studies. It comes under the section 3 of the University Grants Commission Act, 1956.

== History ==
It was founded in 1993, dedicated to maritime studies. In the early years, AMET collaborated with international maritime colleges like South Tyneside College, Hull College, Glasgow College of Nautical Sciences etc. During the early stages, AMET was an off-campus institution of Birla Institute of Technology Mesra. In 2007 AMET was given university status by the Ministry of HRD. The Department of Naval Architecture was founded in 2007.

== Academic divisions, departments, and centres ==
Division	Departments, Centres, and Units
School of Nautical Science	Department of Nautical Science; Department of Pre-Sea Modular Programmes; HND Nautical Science; Post Sea Programme; GMDSS Programmes
School of Marine Science	Department of Marine Engineering; HND Marine Engineering
School of Ocean Engineering	Department of Naval Architecture & Offshore Engineering; Department of Harbour & Ocean Engineering
School of Energy Engineering	Department of Mining Engineering; Department of Petroleum Engineering
School of Engineering & Technology	Department of Electrical and Electronics Engineering; Department of Mechanical Engineering
AMET Business School	V. O. Chidambaram centre of Business Studies
School of Life Science	Department of Marine Biotechnology; Department of Food Processing Technology

== National/international collaborations ==
AMET has collaborations with universities and academies in India and abroad. AMET conducts HND programs in collaboration with South Tyneside College (UK) and Glasgow College of Nautical Sciences (UK). The Department Naval architecture has collaboration with the universities of Glasgow and Strathclyde, UK. AMET conducts degrees in collaboration with the University of Plymouth, UK. The university has a tie-up with IIT Madras, DNV Academy India,.AMET has signed a Memorandum of understanding with World Maritime University on 22 February 2013.

== Awards ==
- AMET was awarded "Emerging maritime university of the year" on 2013 by Ministry of Human Resource Development, Govt. of India.
- AMET was awarded "Best Maritime Institute" in 2013 by Lloyd's List Middle East and Indian Subcontinent.
- SME Rating Agency of India Rated AMET's seagoing courses with a Grade-1 in 2012

== Ranking ==
As per International Association of Maritime universities AMET was ranked 3rd in worldwide overall bench marking 2019–20. AMET also came second in research Bench marking., AMET is accredited by the National Assessment and Accreditation Council (NAAC)(A Grade with a CGPA of 3.13).

== Admissions process ==
Admissions for AMET are based on All India level online exams. The preliminary round of entrance examinations are done online, and the next round is held after shortlisting the candidates at the university campus .

== Faculties ==
AMET University has nine faculties under which it offers academic and extension programs.

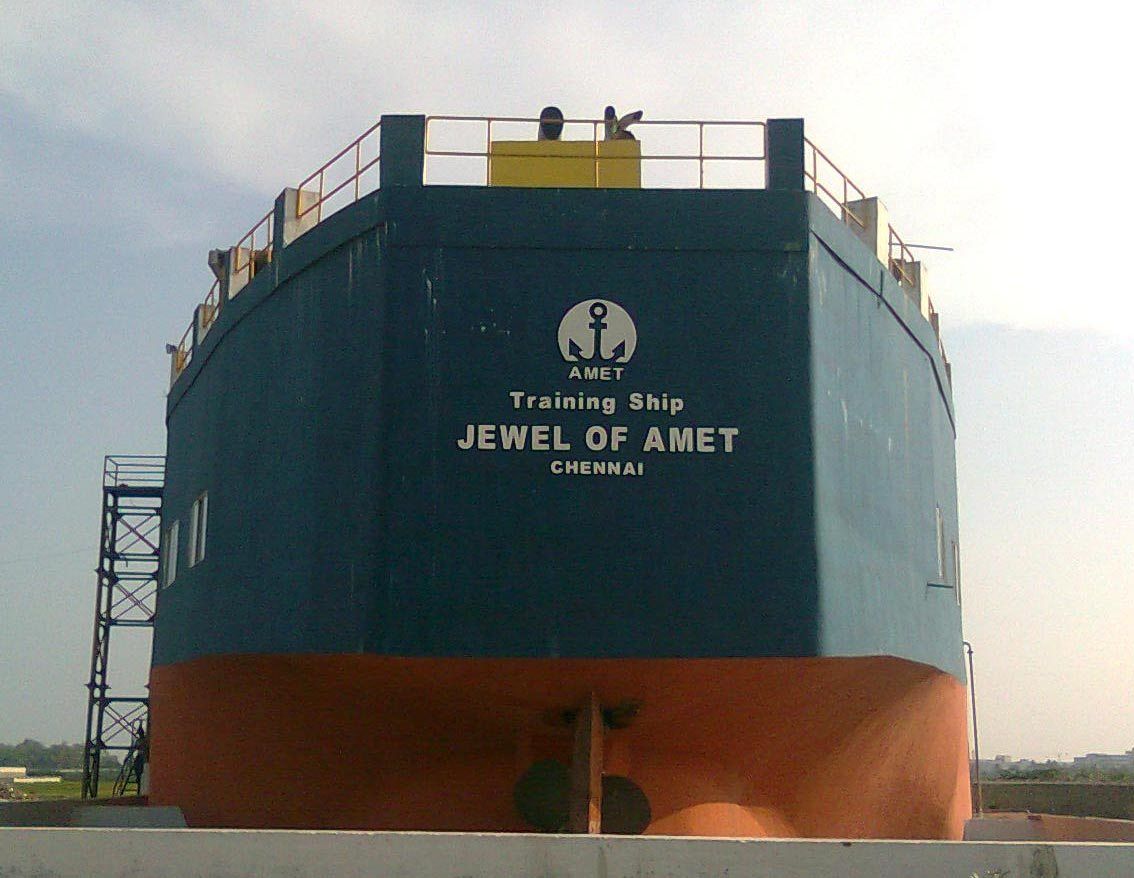
The Jewel of AMET, a model ship located on the AMET campus

AMET uses a model ship in campus near water, the Jewel of AMET. A Polaris bridge simulator is on campus for training students of Nautical science.
