= K. R. Puri =

Indian banker

Governor of the Reserve Bank of India
- In office 20 August 1975 – 2 March 1977
- Preceded by: N. C. Sen Gupta
- Succeeded by: M. Narasimham

Personal details
- Occupation: Economist, Banker

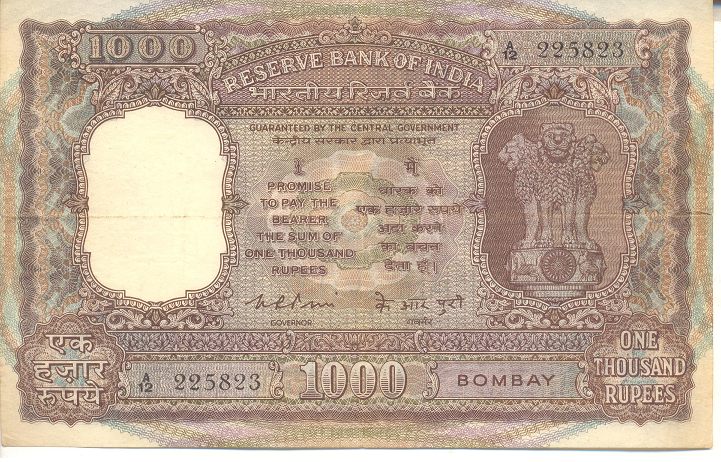
1000 Indian Rupee Currency Note signed by K. R. Puri

K. R. Puri born in Kharkhoda, Haryana was Governor of the Reserve Bank of India from 20 August 1975 to 2 May 1977. He was the Chairman and Managing Director of the Life Insurance Corporation of India prior to his appointment as Governor of the RBI.

His signature appears on one of the last Indian rupee notes of 1,000 denomination. These notes were demonetised in 1978, and were re-introduced after a period of 22 years in 2000.
