= Financial Stability and Development Council =

Apex-level body constituted by the Indian government

Coordinates: 28°36′53.2″N 77°12′18.1″E

Financial Stability and Development Council (FSDC) is an apex-level body constituted by the government of India. The idea to create such a super regulatory body was first mooted by the Raghuram Rajan Committee in 2008. Finally in 2010, the then Finance Minister of India, Pranab Mukherjee, decided to set up such an autonomous body dealing with macro prudential and financial regularities in the entire financial sector of India. An apex-level FSDC is not a statutory body. The recent global economic meltdown has put pressure on governments and institutions across the globe to regulate their economic assets. This council is seen as India's initiative to be better conditioned to prevent such incidents in future. The new body envisages to strengthen and institutionalise the mechanism of maintaining financial stability, financial sector development, inter-regulatory coordination along with monitoring macro-prudential regulation' of economy. No funds are separately allocated to the council for undertaking its activities. Union Minister for Finance & Corporate Affairs Smt. Nirmala Sitharaman chaired the 26th meeting of the Financial Stability and Development Council (FSDC) on September 15, 2022.

== Composition of the council ==
- Chairperson: The Union Finance Minister of India
- Members:
  - Governor Reserve Bank of India (RBl),
  - Finance Secretary and/ or Secretary, Department of Economic Affairs (DEA),
  - Secretary, Department of Financial Services (DFS),
  - Secretary, Ministry of Corporate Affairs,
  - Secretary, Ministry of Electronics and Information Technology,
  - Chief Economic Advisor, Ministry of Finance,
  - Chairman, Securities and Exchange Board of India (SEBI),
  - Chairman, Insurance Regulatory and Development Authority (IRDA),
  - Chairman, Pension Fund Regulatory and Development Authority (PFRDA),
  - Chairman, Insolvency and Bankruptcy Board of India (IBBI),
- Additional Secretary, Ministry of Finance, DEA, will be the Secretary of the Council,
- The Chairperson may invite any person whose presence is deemed necessary for any of its meetings.

== Responsibilities ==
- Financial Stability
- Financial Sector Development
- Inter-Regulatory Coordination
- Financial Literacy
- Financial Inclusion
- Macro prudential supervision of the economy including the functioning of large financial conglomerates
- Coordinating India's international interface with financial sector bodies like the Financial Action Task Force (FATF), Financial Stability Board (FSB) and any such body as may be decided by the Finance Minister from time to time.

The institutional structure for India’s Financial Inclusion/ Literacy programme is unique as it has an apex body in the Financial Stability and Development Council (FSDC), headed by the Finance Minister of Government of India, mandated, inter alia, to focus on attaining financial inclusion/ literacy goals.

== Structural and Functional changes ==
- To Entrust it with the tasks of existing regulators i.e. RBI, IRDA, SEBI, PFRDA.
- The Council shall have a sub-committee headed by the Governor, RBl. The sub-committee will replace the existing High Level Coordination Committee on Financial Markets.

Sectoral regulators’ autonomy to be protected.

Guidelines prepared on functioning of the Financial Stability and Development Council (FSDC), a high-level body set up to sort out inter-regulatory issues, will define the role of the finance ministry and how member regulators’ autonomy is not compromised.

FSDC was formed to bring greater coordination among financial market regulators. The council is headed by the finance minister and has the Reserve Bank of India (RBI) governor and chairpersons of the Securities and Exchange Board of India, Insurance Regulatory and Development Authority and Pension Fund Regulatory and Development Authority as other members along with finance ministry officials.

RBI and other regulators had earlier feared that their autonomy was at stake as FSDC was headed by the finance minister herself. After the assurance of FM, this fear was set to rest but functional guidelines was supposed to address this issue.

== See also ==
- List of financial supervisory authorities by country
