= Finance in India =

A prevailing trend from the medieval period, most Indians invest more than half of personal savings physical assets such as land, houses, gold, livestock, and other precious metals and ornaments. Since liberalisation in the 1990s, the Government of India has approved significant banking reforms. While some of these relate to nationalised banks (like encouraging mergers, reducing government interference and increasing profitability and competitiveness), other reforms have opened up the banking and insurance sectors to private and foreign players.

== Banking and other lending financial institutions ==
Prime Minister Indira Gandhi nationalised 14 banks in 1969, followed by six others in 1980, and made it mandatory for banks to provide 40% of their net credit to priority sectors like agriculture, small-scale industry, retail trade, small businesses, etc. to ensure that the banks fulfill their social and developmental goals. Since then, the number of bank branches has increased from 10,120 in 1969 to 98,910 in 2003 and the population covered by a branch decreased from 63,800 to 15,000 during the same period. The total deposits increased 32.6 times between 1971 and 1991 compared to 7 times between 1951 and 1971. Despite an increase of rural branches, from 1,860 or 22% of the total number of branches in 1969 to 32,270 or 48%, only 32,270 out of 500,000 villages are covered by a scheduled bank.

The Indian money market is classified into: the organised sector (comprising private, public and foreign owned commercial banks and cooperative banks, together known as scheduled banks); and the unorganised sector (comprising individual or family owned indigenous bankers or money lenders and non-banking financial companies (NBFCs). The unorganised sector and microcredit are still preferred over traditional banks in rural and sub-urban areas, especially for non-productive purposes, like ceremonies and short duration loans.

As of 2007, banking in India is generally mature in terms of supply, product range and reach-even, though reach in rural India still remains a challenge for the private sector and foreign banks. In terms of quality of assets and capital adequacy, Indian banks are considered to have clean, strong and transparent balance sheets relative to other banks in comparable economies of Asia. The Reserve Bank of India is an autonomous body, with minimal pressure from the government. The stated policy of the Bank on the Indian Rupee is to manage volatility but without any fixed exchange rate. As of 2023, the largest Public Sector Undertaking (PSU) bank is State Bank of India. Other large PSU banks include Punjab National Bank, Bank of Baroda, Canara Bank, and Union Bank of India. The largest private sector bank, as of 2023, is HDFC Bank. Other large private sector banks include ICICI Bank, Axis Bank, Kotak Mahindra Bank, and IndusInd Bank.

== Insurance ==
Insurance sector in India is regulated by the Insurance Regulatory and Development Authority of India (IRDAI). Also, it is largely financed by Foreign Direct Investment.

== Stock market ==
The development of the stock market in India began with the creation of the Bombay Stock Exchange in 1875 and the Calcutta Stock Exchange in 1863. As of 2024, the National Stock Exchange of India, founded in 1992, is the world's 5th largest stock exchange.

== Investment banking ==
Investment banking in India started in the 19th century when European merchant banks began establishing trading houses in the country. Foreign investment banks dominated the sector until the 1970s, when the State Bank of India launched its Bureau of Merchant Banking, and ICICI Securities became the first Indian private sector financial institution to offer merchant banking services. Notable Indian investment banks include JM Financial and Edelweiss Group. Several other large private sector Indian banks have investment banking divisions. These include, HDFC Bank, Kotak Bank and Axis Bank. Since 2016, foreign investment banks are losing ground to Indian investment banks in managing domestic initial public offerings (IPOs).

== See also ==
1. Economy of India
2. Securities and Exchange Board of India
3. Reserve Bank of India
4. Ministry of Finance (India)
5. Insurance Regulatory and Development Authority of India (IRDAI)
