= N. C. Sen Gupta =

Indian civil servant

Nirmal Chandra Sen Gupta

Governor of the Reserve Bank of India

Order of the British Empire
- In office 19 March 1975 – 19 August 1975
- Preceded by: Sarukkai Jagannathan
- Succeeded by: K. R. Puri

Personal details
- Occupation: Economist, Banker

Nirmal Chandra Sen Gupta was the eleventh Governor of the Reserve Bank of India from 19 May 1975 to 19 August 1975.

He was the interim governor until K R Puri took office. Prior to that, he was the secretary to the Department of Banking of the Ministry of Finance. Even though his tenure was short, his signature appears on the Indian rupee note of 1000 denomination. This is the only note that bears his signature.
