= Micro Units Development and Refinance Agency Bank =

Indian government scheme to support and enhance the micro business sector

Micro Units Development and Refinance Agency (MUDRA) Bank
- Type: Subsidiary
- Industry: Business finance
- Founded: 8 April 2015; 11 years ago
- Headquarters: Mumbai
- Area served: India
- Products: Microfinance and refinance

Micro Units Development and Refinance Agency Bank (or MUDRA Bank)) is a public sector financial institution in India. It provides loans to micro-finance institutions and non-banking financial institutions, which in turn provide credit to micro, small and medium enterprises (MSMEs). It was launched by Prime Minister Narendra Modi on 8 April 2015.

== Overview ==
The formation of the agency was initially announced in the 2015 Union budget of India in February 2015. It was formally launched on 8 April.

The MUDRA banks were set up under the Pradhan Mantri MUDRA Yojana scheme. It will provide its services to small entrepreneurs outside the service area of regular banks, by using last mile agents. About 5.77 crore (57.6 million) small business have been identified as target clients using the NSSO survey of 2013. Only 4% of these businesses get finance from regular banks. The bank will also ensure that its clients do not fall into indebtedness and will lend responsibly.

MUDRA has been initially formed as a wholly owned subsidiary of Small Industries Development bank of India (SIDBI) with 100% capital being contributed by it. Presently, the authorized capital of MUDRA is 1000 crores and paid up capital is 750 crore, fully subscribed by SIDBI. More capital is expected to enhance the functioning of MUDRA.

This Agency would be responsible for developing and refinancing all Micro-enterprises sector by supporting the finance Institutions which are in the business of lending to micro / small business entities engaged in manufacturing, trading and service activities. MUDRA would partner with Banks, MFIs and other lending institutions at state level / regional level to provide micro finance support to the micro enterprise sector in the country.

The bank will classify its clients into three categories and the maximum allowed loan sums will be based on the category:

- Shishu (शिशु): Allowed loans up to ₹50,000 (US$520)
- Kishor (किशोर): Allowed loans up to ₹5 lakh (US$5,200)
- Tarun (तरुण): Allowed loans up to ₹20 lakh (US$21,000)

Government has decided to provide an additional fund of ₹1 trillion (US$10 billion) to the market and will be allocated as

- 40% to Shishu
- 35% to Kishor
- 25% to Tarun

Those eligible to borrow from MUDRA bank are

- Small manufacturing unit
- Shopkeepers
- Fruit and vegetable vendors
- Artisans

== See also ==
- Small Industries Development Bank of India
- Financial inclusion
