= Sarukkai Jagannathan =

Indian banker

Governor of the Reserve Bank of India
- In office 16 June 1970 – 19 March 1975
- Preceded by: B. N. Adarkar
- Succeeded by: N. C. Sen Gupta

Personal details
- Occupation: Economist, Banker

Sarukkai Jagannathan (18 May 1914 – 1996) was the tenth Governor of the Reserve Bank of India from 16 June 1970 to 19 May 1975.

Educated at the Presidency College, Madras, Jagannathan was a member of the Indian Civil Service, and had served with the Central Government. Prior to becoming the Governor of the RBI, he was India's Executive Director at the World Bank.

The oil shock of the 1970s was re-elected by a very active monetary policy during his tenure. Other achievement include an expansion of banking offices in pursuance of the objectives of the nationalisation of private banks.

The Credit Guarantee Corporation of India, and State Level Bankers' Committees were established during his tenure. Indian Rupee notes of ₹ 20 and ₹ 50 denomination were introduced, and these had his signature.

He relinquished office to take up the post of the India's Executive Director at the International Monetary Fund.
