= M. Narasimham =

Indian banker (1927–2021)

13th Governor of Reserve Bank of India
- In office 2 May 1977 – 30 November 1977
- Preceded by: K. R. Puri
- Succeeded by: I. G. Patel

Personal details
- Born: Maidavolu Narasimham; 3 June 1927 Nellore, Madras Presidency, British India (present-day Andhra Pradesh, India)
- Died: 20 April 2021 (aged 93) Hyderabad, Telangana, India
- Cause of death: COVID-19 complications
- Children: 1

Maidavolu Narasimham (3 June 1927 – 20 April 2021) was an Indian banker who served as the thirteenth Governor of the Reserve Bank of India (RBI) from 2 May 1977 to 30 November 1977. For his contributions to the banking and financial sector in India, he is often referred to as the father of banking reforms in India. Some of the reforms attributed to his recommendations include changes to banking structures, introduction of private sector banks, creation of asset recovery funds, rural banking, changes to capital adequacy and provisioning standards, technology upgradation and modernization of public sector banks, and capital market linked banking reforms.

Narasimham also served as India's executive director at the World Bank and later at the International Monetary Fund and the Asian Development Bank. He served as the secretary in the Ministry of Finance, and as the additional secretary of the Department of Economic Affairs as well. He was awarded India's second highest civilian honour, the Padma Vibhushan, in 2000.

== Early life ==
Narasimham was born on 3 June 1927 in Nellore to Padmavati and Maidavolu Seshachelapati. The family hailed from Maidavolu village in Guntur district of present-day Andhra Pradesh. His father was a judge in the High Court of Andhra Pradesh, and his mother was the eldest daughter of Sarvepalli Radhakrishnan.

He completed his education from Presidency College, in Madras and went on to study at the St John's College, Cambridge. He was a budding cricketer and could have been on St. John's College's team with Test-level players, but he was ineligible because of his near-sightedness

== Career ==
Narasimham joined the Reserve Bank of India (RBI), India's central bank in 1950 in Bombay (present day Mumbai). He joined the bank as a Grade B research officer in the Department of Economic and Policy Research (DEPR). He later joined the government and served as additional secretary of the Department of Economic Affairs. He was the first and only Reserve Bank cadre officer to be appointed as governor of the central bank. He served as the thirteenth Governor of the Reserve Bank of India from 2 May 1977 to 30 November 1977.

After his term as the RBI governor, he served as India's executive director at the World Bank and later at the International Monetary Fund. He was also the Vice President of the Asian Development Bank. Narasimham also served as secretary in the Ministry of Finance between 1982 and 1983. He was awarded India's second highest civilian honor Padma Vibhushan in 2000.

=== Banking reforms ===
Narasimham was the chair of two high-powered committees on banking and financial sector reforms viz Committee on the Financial System (1991) and the Committee of Banking Sector Reforms (1998). The reforms and recommendations from these committees have become mainstays in the Indian banking and financial sector leading to Narasimham being referred to as the father of banking reforms in India.

==== Bank structures and mergers ====
Bank mergers toward creation of strong public sector mega-banks were first recommended by the Narasimham committee of 1991. India's recent merger of ten public sector banks in 2020 was building on recommendations from this committee.

==== Asset reconstruction ====
Some of the recommendations around creation of Asset Reconstruction Companies as means to securitize bad debt are built on the recommendations from his committee. His committee also introduced the notion of an asset reconstruction fund to take over bad loans. As a follow-up, six special debt recovery tribunals were set up. This served as the foundation for India's current Insolvency and Bankruptcy Code which was codified in 2016.

==== Rural banking ====
Earlier in 1976, he had also been the author of the Regional Rural Bank report which was the basis for the setup of regional rural banks in India, building on his blueprint and recommendations of having these banks maintain a local appeal while bringing the professionalism from large commercial banks.

==== Capital adequacy ====
The first committee report of 1991 introduced the notion of a capital adequacy ratio while proposing a phased reduction in mandatory bond investment and cash reserve ratios in an attempt to encourage lending. The committee also introduced rules around non-performing assets (NPA) classification and also had the Reserve Bank of India (RBI) requiring banks make provisions for bad loans.

==== Private banks and modernization of public sector banks ====
Some of the other recommendations from Narasimham included creation of new generation private sector banks including ICICI Bank, HDFC Bank, and Kotak Mahindra Bank. His recommendations also had banks raising money from the capital markets. Interest rates were also de-regulated fostering competition between banks. Amongst the other Public sector banks (PSB), the committee recommended that the government separate ownership from management and also led to technology upgradation and modernization.

== Published works ==
- Narasimham, M. (1985). India and the Current Crisis in the International Economy. IMC Economic Research and Training Foundation.
- Narasimham, M. (1988). World Economic Environment and Prospects for India. Sterling Publishers. ISBN 978-81-207-0769-6.
- System, India Committee on the Financial; Narasimham, M. (1992). The Financial System, Report. Nabhi Publications. ISBN 978-81-7274-027-6.
- Narasimham, M. (2002). Economic Reforms: Development and Finance. U B S P D. ISBN 978-81-7476-381-5.
- Narasimham, M. (2002). From Reserve Bank to Finance Ministry and Beyond: Some Reminiscences. UBS Publishers' Distributors. ISBN 978-81-7476-397-6.

== Death ==
Narasimham died on 20 April 2021 in Hyderabad from COVID-19 complications. He was aged 94.
