= Small Industries Development Bank of India =

Regulatory body

Small Industries Development Bank of India (SIDBI)
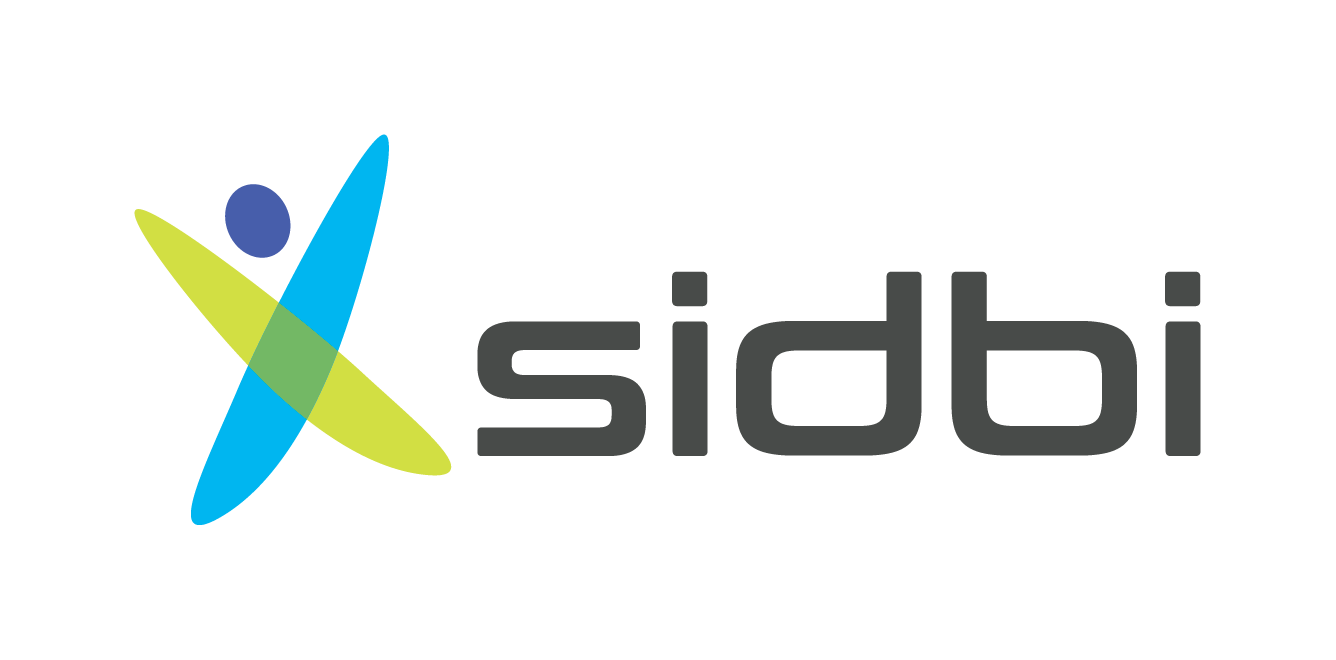

Agency overview
- Formed: 2 April 1990; 36 years ago
- Type: Regulatory body
- Jurisdiction: Ministry of Finance, Government of India
- Headquarters: Lucknow, Uttar Pradesh, India
- Agency executive: Manoj Mittal, (Chairman & MD)
- Website: www.sidbi.in

Small Industries Development Bank of India (SIDBI) is the apex regulatory body for overall licensing and regulation of micro, small and medium enterprise finance companies in India. It is under the jurisdiction of Ministry of Finance, Government of India, It is headquartered at Lucknow and has offices across the country.

SIDBI was established on 2 April 1990 by the Government of India, as a wholly owned subsidiary of IDBI Bank. It was delinked from IDBI on 27 March 2000. Its purpose is to provide refinance facilities to banks and financial institutions and engage in term lending and working capital finance to industries, and serves as the principal financial institution in the Micro, Small and Medium Enterprises (MSME) sector. SIDBI also coordinates the functions of institutions engaged in similar activities. It was established through an Act of Parliament. SIDBI is one of the five All India Financial Institutions regulated and supervised by the Reserve Bank of India. The other four are Exim Bank of India, NABARD, NaBFID and National Housing Bank. They play a statutory role in the financial markets through credit extension and refinancing operation activities and cater to the long-term financing needs of the industrial sector.

SIDBI is active in the development of Micro Finance Institutions through SIDBI Foundation for Micro Credit, and assists in extending microfinance through the Micro Finance Institution (MFI) route. Its promotion & development program focuses on rural enterprises promotion and entrepreneurship development.

In order to increase and support money supply to the MSE sector, it operates a refinance program known as Institutional Finance program. Under this program, SIDBI extends Term Loan assistance to Banks, Small Finance Banks and Non-Banking Financial Companies. Besides the refinance operations, SIDBI also lends directly to MSMEs.

== Non-Financial Intervention ==
As part of non-financial intervention in the MSME sector, SIDBI had also undertaken various measures in the past. Recently, in association with credit rating agency CRISIL and Credit Information Company TransUnion CIBIL it has introduced "CriSidEx" and "MSME Pulse".

CriSidEx, India's first sentiment index for micro and small enterprises (MSEs) has been developed jointly by CRISIL & SIDBI. It is a composite index based on a diffusion index of 8 parameters and measures MSE business sentiment on a scale of 0 (extremely negative) to 200 (extremely positive). The crucial benefit of CriSidEx is that its readings will flag potential headwinds and changes in production cycles and thus help improve market efficiencies. And by capturing the sentiment of exporters and importers, it will also offer actionable indicators on foreign trade.

SIDBI in association with TransUnion CIBIL launched "MSME Pulse" and Microfinance Pulse launched by Equifax, a quarterly report on MSME credit activity, for closely tracking and monitoring the MSME segment in the country. The report is based on a study done on over five million active MSMEs who have access to formal credit, with live credit facilities in the Indian banking system.

SIDBI has launched the ‘Udyami Mitra’ Portal to improve accessibility of credit and handholding services to MSMEs. They can select and apply for preferred banks through this portal. Under the portal entrepreneurs can apply for loan without physically visiting any bank branches and can select from over 1 lakh bank branches, track their application status and avail multiple loan benefits. It also has facility for uploading all necessary documents. Through the portal the MSMEs can also seek handholding support for getting finance. SIDBI has also entered into an arrangement with CSC e-governance Services (CSCeGS) to take Udyami Mitra portal to the unserved and the underserved MSMEs. CSCeGS is a special purpose vehicle (SPV) set up by ministry of electronics and IT (MeitY) which acts as connect point for various digitally aligned services to villages in the country.

In May 2024, The Small Industries Development Bank of India (SIDBI) signed a MoU with Airbus Helicopters to finance civil helicopter purchases in India.

== Other activities ==
SIDBI has floated several other entities for related activities, including:

- The SIDBI Foundation for Microcredit
- SIDBI Venture Capital Limited (SVCL) – for providing Venture Capital (VC) assistance to MSMEs;
- Micro Units Development & Refinance Agency (MUDRA) – for 'funding the unfunded' micro enterprises in the country;
- Receivable Exchange of India Ltd. (RXIL) to enable faster realisation of receivables by MSMEs;
- SMERA Ratings Limited (SMERA) – for credit rating of MSMEs, renamed as Acuite Ratings & Research Limited.;
- India SME Technology Services Ltd (ISTSL) – for technology advisory and consultancy services and
- India SME Asset Reconstruction Company Ltd. (ISARC) for speedier resolution of Non-Performing Assets (NPA) in the MSME sector.

SIDBI supports the Government of India in its initiatives and work as a nodal agency for some of the schemes related to development of MSMEs, such as Make in India and Startup India.

== See also ==
- List of national development banks
