= SME Rating Agency of India =

Enterprise credit rating agency in India

SMERA Ratings Private Limited
- Industry: Credit Ratings
- Founded: 2005
- Headquarters: 905, Lodha Supremus, Kanjurmarg East, Mumbai, Maharashtra, India
- Key people: Prosenjit Ghosh, Sankar Chakraborti
- Products: Small & Medium Enterprises (SME) Rating, Credit Due Diligence, Microfinace Grading, SMERA Terminal
- Parent: Acuité Ratings & Research Limited
- Website: www.smeraonline.com

SMERA, widely known as ‘The SME Rating Agency’, is a credit rating agency in India that provides credit ratings primarily of small and medium-sized enterprises.

Initially an initiative of the Ministry of Finance, Govt. of India and the Reserve Bank of India, SMERA is now a subsidiary of Acuité Ratings & Research Limited. Acuité, a joint initiative of Small Industries Development Bank of India (SIDBI), Dun & Bradstreet Information Services India Private Limited (D&B), Standard Chartered, ICICI and leading public sector banks in India, is registered with SEBI as a credit rating agency.
