= Indian Stamp Act, 1899 =

Imperial Legislative Assembly
- Long title: An Act to consolidate and amend the law relating to Stamps
- Enacted by: Imperial Legislative Assembly
- Enacted: 27 January 1899
- Effective: 1 July 1899
- Status: In force

The Indian Stamp Act of 1899 (2 of 1899), is an in-force Act of the Government of India for the charging of stamp duty on instruments recording transactions.

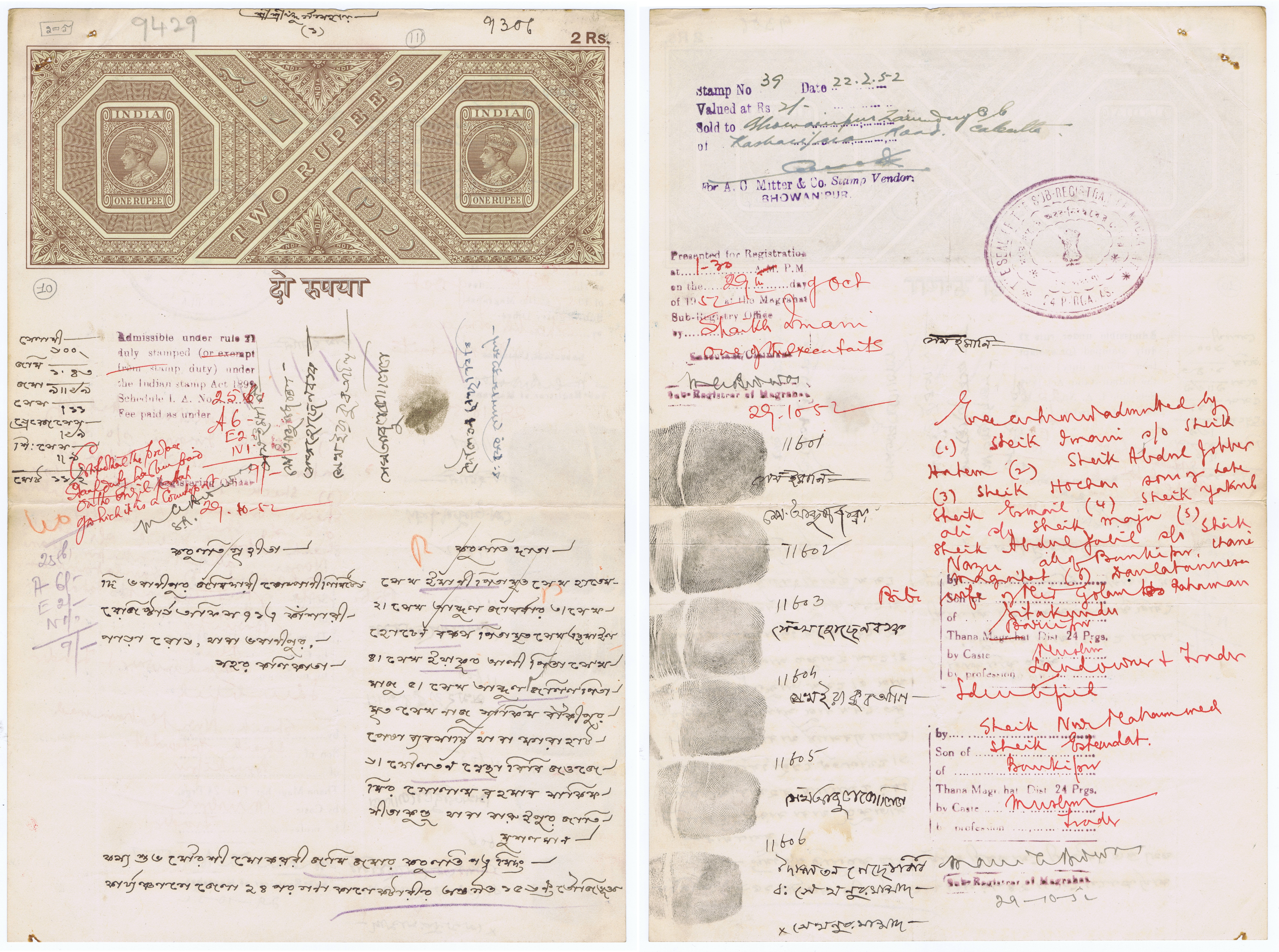
An India Rs. 2 stamped paper charged under the act in 1952

== Amendments ==
The act was amended by "Enforcement of Security Interest and Recovery of Debts Laws and Miscellaneous Provisions (Amendment) Bill, 2016", passed by Lok Sabha on 2 August 2016.
