= The SIDBI Foundation for Microcredit =

SIDBI Foundation for Microcredit
- Type: Division
- Industry: Financial services
- Founded: November 1998; 27 years ago
- Founder: Small Industries Development Bank of India
- Headquarters: Lucknow, Uttar Pradesh, India
- Area served: India
- Products: Bulk microcredit loans for on-lending to poor individuals and groups
- Parent: Small Industries Development Bank of India
- Website: www.sidbi.in

The SIDBI foundation for Microcredit (SFMC) is an Indian financial division that provides bulk loans to microfinance institutions (MFIs) in India. It is a division of Indian governments Small Industries Development Bank of India (SIDBI). In practice, it acts as an oversight over MFIs which are the intermediaries between the retail borrowers consisting of poor people and individual borrowers living in rural areas or urban slums and the public sector development finance institutions.

The SFMC plays an increasingly important role in providing ‘user-friendly’ formal financial services to the poor due to the failure of the main poverty alleviation programme - the Integrated Rural Development Programme (IRDP). Extensive malpractices, misutilisation of funds and low repayment rates (25-33 percent) have urged a shift towards semi-formal development finance institutions. This pattern of an increasing involvement of financial institutions with micro-finance in developing countries follows on the success stories in the early 2000s within the Commercial Bank of Zimbabwe and Cooperative Bank of Kenya.

== Methodology ==
Currently, the SFMC provides funds for on-lending and capacity building support to 44 MFIs with over 1.3 million members. The majority of MFIs operated under a self-help group model (SHG). 90 percent of its total members are concentrated in the southern states, with 78 percent of them operating within a rural environment and a 95 percent membership rate among women. Rural farmers were targeted because of their perceived needs for micro-credit, used either to invest in productive activities or correct income shortfalls resulting from adverse harvest outcomes. At the same time, women were placed at the forefront because they tend to be more willing to attend group meetings and adhere to loan and savings conditions. Moreover, they were almost more likely to reinvest in the household needs of their families.

== Outcomes ==
An impact survey was commissioned by the SFMC from 2002 to 2006 to study the impacts of its programs. The average loan over this period was Rs. 9,100 ($165), and 72 per cent of this amount was used for investment (animals and non-farm enterprises), while the remaining 28 per cent was used to meet household needs (healthcare, food and marriage dowries).

=== Dependency burden ===
More importantly, since micro-credit represents only one source of loans, some reduction on the dependence on informal sources like moneylenders and family friends was noted. Specifically, the dependency ratio on moneylenders fell from 44 percent to 34 percent, while borrowing from other informal sources fell from 40 percent to 25 percent. This represents a significant improvement on the borrowing terms as informal sources were reported to charge interest rates of above 36 percent, sometimes even up to 200 percent for short-term loans. This compares unfavorably to the 14 percent and 41 percent charged respectively by MFIs.

=== Incomes ===
In addition, 70 percent of the supported enterprises reported an increase in income as a result of micro-credit - by ‘taking advantage of working capital to diversify or improve the quality of goods’, or through savings by making seasonal bulk purchases. In the urban sample, part of this diversification was directed at manufacturing (10 percent) and new non-farm enterprises like a small shop or handlooms (25 percent). On the other hand, clients in the rural sample invested proportionally between agriculture, animals and non-farm activities like a milch animal. This has helped to reduce the dependency of farmers to seasonal incomes and encourages ‘grass roots level’ entrepreneurship. At the same time, investment into insurance has also helped farmers to hedge against the risk of seasonal difficulties, like an extended monsoon season.

=== Women and Education ===
Around 17 percent of the clients with school-age children made borrowings to meet schooling costs, thus opening up new opportunities for social mobility. At the same time within the SHGs, women gain a sense of self-respect and confidence from a collective sharing of experiences and common action. Also, they becoming increasingly involved in joint enterprise management with men, reported in 71 percent of the supported enterprises in the south and 39 percent in the north. This joint-income household pattern helps to alleviate the income burden on men and contributes towards the drive from poverty.
