= National Commodity and Derivatives Exchange =

Indian commodity exchange

NCDEX Limited
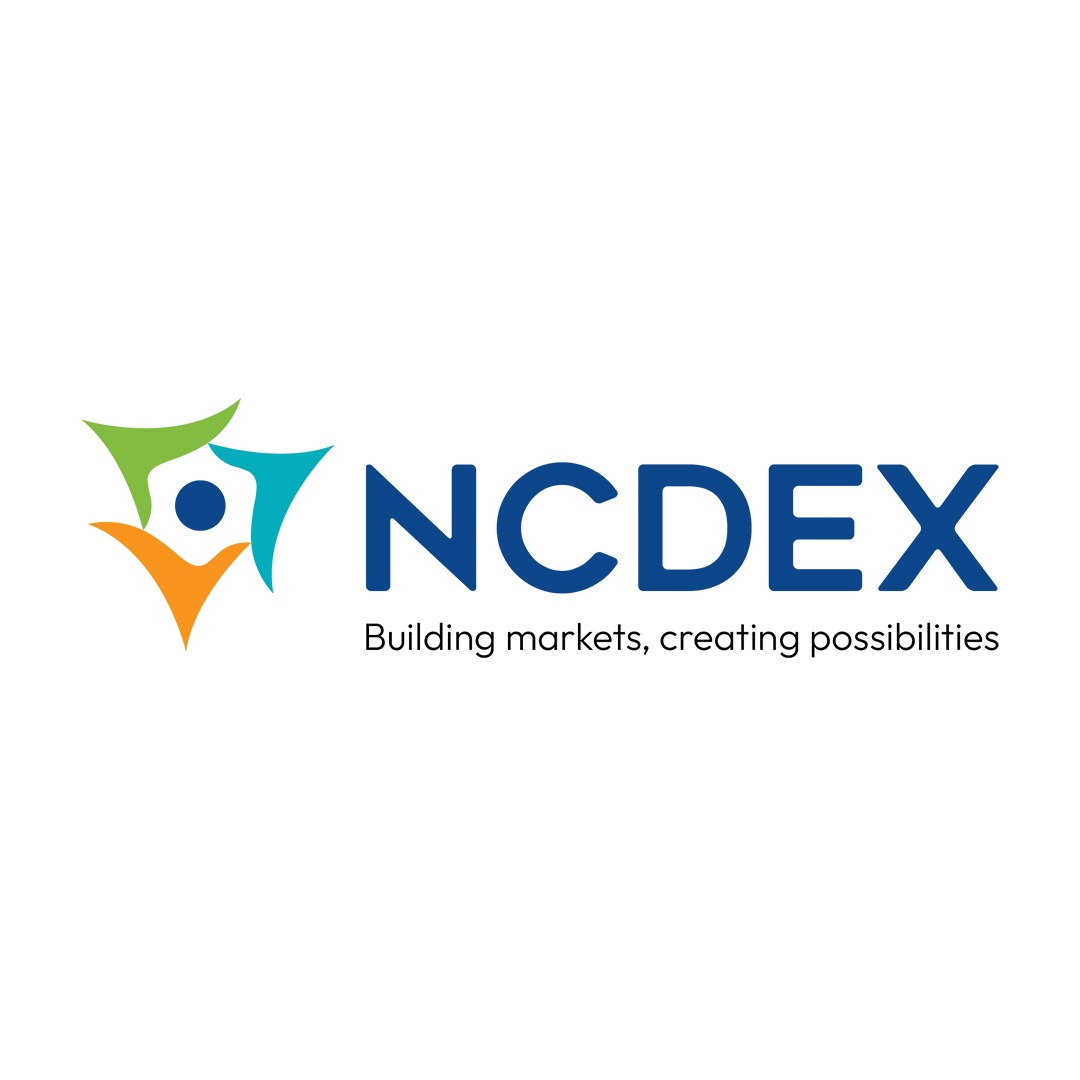
- Formerly: National Commodity & Derivatives Exchange Limited
- Type: Commodity Exchange
- Industry: Business services
- Founded: 15 December 2003
- Headquarters: Mumbai, Maharashtra, India
- Key people: Mr. Vikas Goel (Managing Director & Chief Executive Officer)
- Products: Futures
- Owner: NSE, ICICI, CRISIL, NABARD, LIC, IFFCO and others
- Website: www.ncdex.com/index.aspx

NCDEX Limited (Formerly Known as National Commodity & Derivatives Exchange Limited) is an Indian online commodity and derivative exchange based in India. It has an independent board of directors and provides a commodity exchange platform for market participants to trade in commodity derivatives. It is an online technology-driven trading exchange. It is a private limited company, its original shareholders were National Stock Exchange of India (NSE), National Bank for Agriculture and Rural Development (NABARD), CRISIL (now known as S&P India), Life Insurance Corporation (LIC) ICICI Bank. Current shareholders include IFFCO, Jaypee Capital Services, Punjab National Bank, Canara Bank, Build India Capital Advisors, Shree Renuka sugars and Star Agri warehousing.

NCDEX was incorporated on 23 April 2003 under the Companies Act, 1956 and obtained its Certificate for Commencement of Business on 9 May 2003. It commenced operations on 15 December 2003.

As of 31 July 2013, NCDEX has 848 registered members, a client base of about 20 Lakhs, and offers trading on more than 49,000 terminals across 1,000 centers in India. It facilitates deliveries of commodities through a network of over 594 accredited warehouses through eight warehouse service providers, with holding capacity of around 1.5 million tonnes and average deliveries of 1 lakh MT at every contract expiry. NCDEX has offices in Mumbai, Delhi, Ahmedabad, Indore, Hyderabad, Jaipur, and Kolkata.

== Shareholder consortium ==
- Jaypee Capital Services Limited

== See also ==
- India International Bullion Exchange
- Multi commodity exchange
