= National Bank for Agriculture and Rural Development =

Government owned All India Development Financial Institution and Regulatory Body

- Logo of NABARD

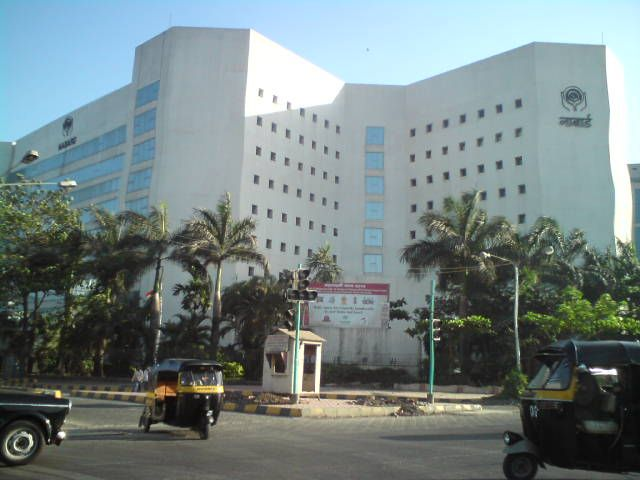
- NABARD Head-office, Mumbai
- Predecessor: Agricultural Refinance and Development Corporation
- Formation: 12 July 1982; 44 years ago
- Type: All Development Financial Institution; Regulatory agency
- Headquarters: Mumbai, India
- Coordinates: 19°03′52″N 72°51′46″E
- Owner: Ministry of Finance, Government of India
- Chairman: Shaji K V (Note: Appointed with effect from 5 December 2022)
- Development Finance Institution of: India
- Subsidiaries: NABkisan, NABsamruddhi, NABfins, NABsanrakshan, NABfoundation, NABcons, NABventure
- Website: www.nabard.org/EngDefault.aspx
- NABARD Act 1981

The National Bank for Agriculture and Rural Development (NABARD) is an All India Development Financial Institution (DFI) and an apex regulatory agency and Supervisory Body for overall supervision of Regional Rural Banks, State Cooperative Banks and District Central Cooperative Banks in India. It was established under the NABARD Act 1981 passed by the Parliament of India. It is fully owned by Government of India and functions under the Department of Financial Services (DFS) under the Ministry of Finance.

== History ==
The importance of institutional credit in boosting rural economy has been clear to the Government of India right from its early stages of planning. Therefore, the Reserve Bank of India (RBI) at the insistence of the Government of India, constituted a Committee to Review the Arrangements For Institutional Credit for Agriculture and Rural Development (CRAFICARD) to look into these very critical aspects. The Committee was formed on 30 March 1979, under the Chairmanship of Shri B. Sivaraman, former member of the Planning Commission, Government of India.

The Committee’s interim report, submitted on 28 November 1979, outlined the need for a new organisational device for providing undivided attention, forceful direction and pointed focus to credit related issues linked with rural development. Its recommendation was the formation of a unique development financial institution which would address these aspirations, and the formation of National Bank for Agriculture and Rural Development (NABARD) was approved by the Parliament through Act 61 of 1981.

NABARD came into existence on 12 July 1982 by transferring the agricultural credit functions of RBI and refinance functions of the then Agricultural Refinance and Development Corporation (ARDC). It was dedicated to the service of the nation by the late Prime Minister Smt. Indira Gandhi on 5 November 1982. Set up with an initial capital of Rs.100 crore, its paid up capital stood at Rs.14,080 crore as of 31 March 2020. Consequent to the revision in the composition of share capital between the Government of India and RBI, NABARD today is fully owned by the Government of India. The authorized share capital is Rs.30,000 crore.

== International Partners ==
World Bank: International associates of NABARD include World Bank-affiliated organisations and global developmental agencies working in the field of agriculture and rural development. These organisations help NABARD by advising and giving monetary aid for the upliftment of the people in the rural areas and optimising the agricultural process. UNDP: The United Nations Development Programme (UNDP) and the National Bank for Agriculture and Rural Development (NABARD) signed a Memorandum of Understanding (MoU) to co-create data-driven innovations in agriculture and food systems to support smallholder farmers. Under this MoU, both organizations will work to improve the lives and livelihoods of smallholder farmers by sharing open-source data for product development, transfer of technology and supporting the framing of agrarian policies.

KfW: Several initiatives are underway to design and implement development projects in India, including the KfW-NABARD Adivasi development programme, the Indo-German watershed development programme, the Indo-German Umbrella Programme for Natural Resource Management, and the NABARD- SDC Rural Innovations Programme. These programs aim to address various challenges faced by rural communities in India.

Women World Banking: In a bid to enhance financial inclusion, the National Bank for Agriculture and Rural Development (NABARD) and Women's World Banking entered into a Memorandum of Understanding (MoU) to promote the Jan Dhan Plus program through Regional Rural Banks. This collaboration targets increased utilization and adoption of basic financial services amongst the 8.09 crore Jan Dhan account holders, with a specific focus on empowering the 5.45 crore women account holders.

== Role ==
NABARD has been instrumental in grounding rural, social innovations and social enterprises in the rural hinterlands. As of May 2023, NABARD operates at 31 Regional Offices in the country. It has in the process partnered with about 4000 partner organisations in grounding many of the interventions, be it the SHG-Bank Linkage programme, tree-based tribal communities' livelihoods initiative, the watershed approach in soil and water conservation, increasing crop productivity initiatives through the lead crop initiative or dissemination of information flow to agrarian communities through farmer clubs. Despite all this, it pays huge taxes too, to the national treasury – figuring in the top 50 tax payers consistently. NABARD virtually ploughs back all the profits for development spending. Thus the organisation had developed a huge amount of trust capital in its 3 decades of work with rural communities. NABARD's role could be broadly categorised into three functions:

=== 1. Refinancing ===
NABARD serves as an apex financing agency for the institutions providing investment and production credit for promoting the various developmental activities in rural areas. It co-ordinates the rural financing activities of all institutions engaged in developmental work at the field level and maintains liaison with the Government of India, state governments, Reserve Bank of India (RBI) and other national level institutions concerned with policy formulation. It also refinances fund from World Bank and Asian Development Bank to state co-operative agriculture and rural development banks (SCARDBs), state co-operative banks (SCBs), regional rural banks (RRBs), commercial banks (CBs) and other financial institutions approved by RBI. While the ultimate beneficiaries of investment credit can be individuals, partnership concerns, companies, State-owned corporations or co-operative societies, production credit is generally given to individuals.

=== 2. Banking Supervision ===
NABARD supervises State Cooperative Banks (StCBs), District Cooperative Central Banks (DCCBs), and Regional Rural Banks (RRBs) and conducts statutory inspections of these banks. It takes measures towards institution building for improving absorptive capacity of the credit delivery system, including monitoring, formulation of rehabilitation schemes, restructuring of credit institutions, training of personnel, etc. It also undertakes monitoring and evaluation of projects refinanced by it.

=== 3. Development ===
NABARD is also known for its 'SHG Bank Linkage Programme' which encourages India's banks to lend to self-help groups (SHGs). Largely because SHGs are composed mainly of poor women, this has evolved into an important Indian tool for microfinance. By March 2006, 22 lakh SHGs representing 3.3 crore members had to be linked to credit through this programme.

NABARD also has a portfolio of Natural Resource Management Programmes involving diverse fields like Watershed Development, Tribal Development and Farm Innovation through dedicated funds set up for the purpose.

== Regional Offices ==
NABARD has its head office at Mumbai, India and regional offices in all states, as well as one special cell at Srinagar, Jammu and Kashmir. The Regional Office [RO] is headed by a Chief General Manager [CGM] as Officer in Charge, and the Head Office has several top executives viz the Directors, Deputy Managing Directors [DMD], and the Chairperson. The Board of Directors are appointed by the Government of India in consonance with NABARD Act. It has 336 District Offices across the country which are staffed by District Development Managers (DDMs). It also has six training establishments.

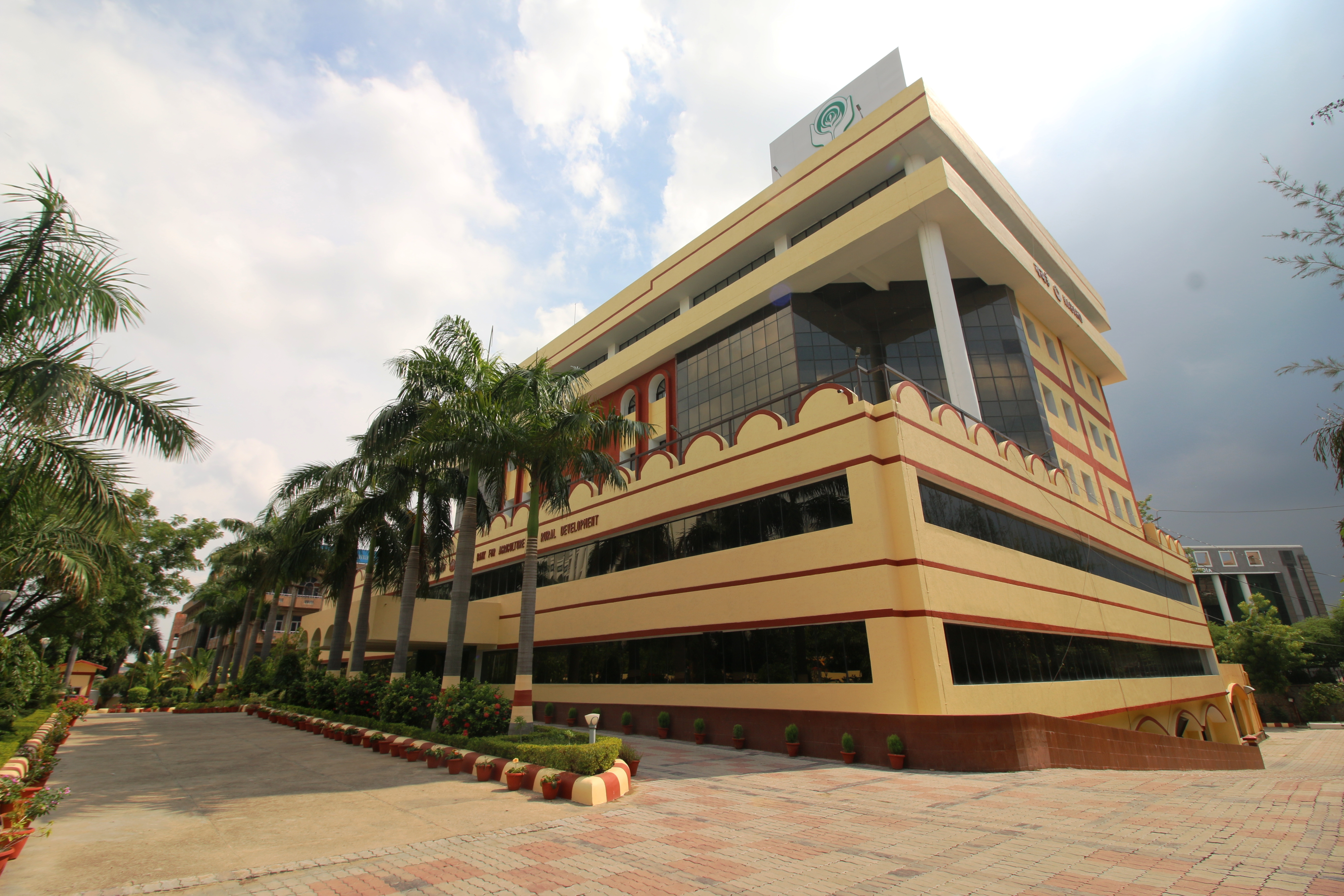
NABARD RO, Lucknow

== Subsidiaries ==
NABARD has seven subsidiaries, established to leverage the institute's expertise with its own specialists catering to specific sectors.

=== NABKISAN ===
The main objective of the NABKISAN is to provide credit for promotion, expansion and commercialization of enterprises in agriculture, allied and rural non-farm activities. It has extended support to 550 FPOs across various states in the country with cumulative assistance of more than Rs 225 crore.

=== NABSAMRUDDHI ===
The objective of NABSAMRUDDHI is to provide credit facilities to legal entities for promotion, expansion, commercialization and modernization in non-farm activities including microfinance, MSME, housing, education, transport, etc. In March 2024, it launched the first phase of a nationwide funding awareness campaign, 'Climate Ready WASH', for women joint liability group (JLG) borrowers of microfinance institutions, to take forward the common mandate of sustainable rural development.

=== NABFINS ===
NABFINS' approach to the business of microfinance is defined by its tagline "Balancing Business with Inclusion". It adopts a unique model which leverages social collateral provided by the Self Help Groups (SHGs) & Joint Liability Groups (JLGs) by offering micro-credit at their doorstep, at the lowest interest rate among NBFC-MFIs to low income households, comprising predominantly women.

=== NABFOUNDATION ===
NABFOUNDATION is Non-Profit entity of NABARD which was established for executing impactful projects either on its own, or, in partnership with other stakeholders (like civil society organizations, agri-universities, Government departments and CSR outfits of both public and private organizations). In 2021, it has entered into an Memorandum of Understanding (MoU) with Dalmia Bharat Foundation to develop a unique skill mapping programme for unemployed youths in all the North Eastern states of Assam, Sikkim, Arunachal Pradesh, Nagaland, Mizoram, Manipur, Meghalaya and Tripura. An MoU was signed between NABFOUNDATION and Dalmia Bharat Foundation (DBF) in Delhi recently to collaborate on the project. NABSAMRUDDHI and NABFINS, two other subsidiaries of NABARD, have also stepped forward to support this unique initiative.

=== NABCONS ===
It is a Consultancy Wing of NABARD. NABCONS' objective is to provide consultancy in all spheres of agriculture, rural development and allied areas. In 2023, the agriculture department in Kerala state was on the verge of creating the first-ever Digital Crop Survey (DCS). The implementation of this programme was to be carried out by NABCONS.

=== NABVENTURES ===
It is the Investment Manager of NABVENTURES Fund I with a target corpus of INR 500 crore. The fund focus on investments in early to mid-stage start-ups in agriculture, agtech, agri-biotech, food, agri/rural fintech and rural businesses.

=== NABSanrakshan ===
It aims to carry out credit guarantee and related activities towards sustainable and equitable agriculture and rural development.

== Rural innovation ==
NABARD's role in rural development in India is phenomenal. The credit flow to agriculture activities sanctioned by NABARD reached Rs 1,57,480 crore in 2005–2006.

Through assistance of the Swiss Agency for Development and Cooperation, NABARD set up the Rural Innovation Fund. The Rural Infrastructure Development Fund (RIDF) is another noted scheme for the bank for rural development. Under the RIDF scheme, Rs. 51,283 crore have been sanctioned for 2,44,651 projects covering irrigation, rural roads and bridges, health and education, soil conservation, water schemes etc. The Rural Innovation Fund is a fund designed to support innovative, risk friendly, unconventional experiments in these sectors that would have the potential to promote livelihood opportunities and employment in rural areas. The assistance is extended to individuals, NGOs, cooperatives, Self Help Groups, and Panchayati Raj Institutions who have the expertise and willingness to implement innovative ideas for improving the quality of life in rural areas. Through a member base of 25 crore, 600000 cooperatives are working in India at a grassroots level in almost every sector of the economy. There are linkages between SHGs and other type institutes with that of cooperatives.

The purpose of RIDF is to promote innovation in rural and agricultural sector through viable means.

In 2007–08, NABARD has started a new direct lending facility under 'Umbrella Programme for Natural Resource Management' (UPNRM). Under this facility financial support for natural resource management activities can be provided as a loan at reasonable rate of interest.

== All India Competitive Examinations ==
NABARD also conducts various examinations to induct various direct recruits in its Group 'A' and Group 'B' Services. Some of them are mentioned below.

- NABARD Grade A Examination: This exam is conducted by the bank almost every year to recruit Grade-A Officers (Assistant Managers in Group 'A') for its Rural Development Banking Services (RDBS) and Rajbhasha Services.
- NABARD Grade-B Examination: This exam is conducted to recruit Grade-B Officers (Managers in Group 'A'). However, its eligibility is different from the NABARD Grade-A Examination is usually focussed at recruiting the existing bankers, based on their performance in the examination.
- NABARD Development Assistant / Development Assistant (Hindi) Examination: This exam is conducted to recruit Development Assistant (DA in Group 'B').

== See also ==
- Grade-A NABARD Examination
- Rural development
- Cooperative banking
- Ministry of Finance (India)
- Ministry of Co-operation
- Ministry of Agriculture and Farmers' Welfare
- List of national development banks
