= District Co-operative Central Bank =

Cooperative bank network in India

A District Co-operative Central Bank (DCCB) is a rural cooperative bank operating at the district level in various parts of India. It was established to provide banking to the rural hinterland for the agricultural sector with the branches primarily established in rural and semi-urban areas.

== Structure ==
The banking model consists of a district central bank for each district in every state of India known with a name as a respective District Central Co-operative Bank. The members and their elected directors who represent a multitude of professional cooperative bodies like milk unions, urban cooperatives, rural cooperatives, agricultural and non-agricultural cooperatives, and various others in turn elect the bank's president. These banks are collectively represented by a State Apex Central Co-operative bank for each state and it acts as the ultimate bank and apex body for the DCCBs in each state. It has been widely observed all over the country that the local politicians who hold the sway over the cooperatives get elected as President of the DCC bank and a president post would mean nurturing for their future political ambitions. However, this trend, which has become a national phenomenon, carries its own advantages and disadvantages.
