= Insolvency and Bankruptcy Board of India =

Regulator of insolvency proceedings in India

- भारतीय दिवाला और शोधन अक्षमता बोर्ड
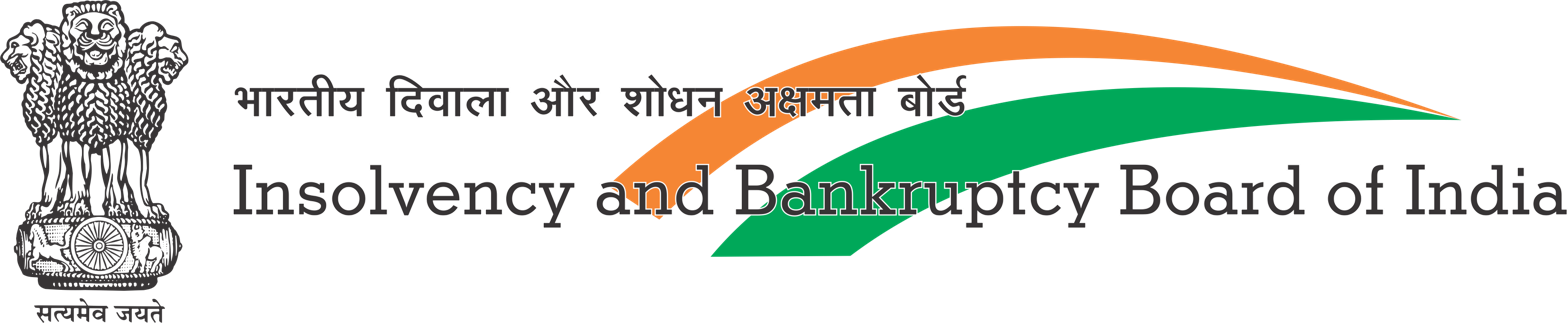
- Logo of IBBI

Regulatory agency overview
- Formed: 1 October 2016; 9 years ago
- Jurisdiction: Government of India
- Headquarters: Mayur Bhawan, Shankar Market, Connaught Circus, New Delhi
- Regulatory agency executive: Ravi Mital, Chairperson
- Parent department: Ministry of Corporate Affairs
- Key document: Insolvency and Bankruptcy Code
- Website: www.ibbi.gov.in

The Insolvency and Bankruptcy Board of India (IBBI) is the regulator for overseeing insolvency proceedings and entities like Insolvency Professional Agencies (IPA), Insolvency Professionals (IP) and Information Utilities (IU) in India. It was established on 1 October 2016 and given statutory powers through the Insolvency and Bankruptcy Code, which was passed by Lok Sabha on 5 May 2016. It covers Individuals, Companies, Limited Liability Partnerships and Partnership firms. The new code will speed up the resolution process for stressed assets in the country. It attempts to simplify the process of insolvency and bankruptcy proceedings. It handles the cases using two tribunals like NCLT (National company law tribunal) and Debt recovery tribunal.

Mr. Jayanti Prasad, Mr. Sandip Garg and Dr. Bhushan Kumar Sinha are currently the Whole Time Members of IBBI.

== IBBI Governing Board ==
IBBI will have 10 members, including representatives from the Ministries of Finance, Law and corporate affairs, and the Reserve Bank of India.As per the statements on their official website, IBBI regulates a process as well as a profession. IBBI has regulatory oversight on Insolvency Professionals, Insolvency Professional Agencies, Insolvency Professional Entities and Information Utilities. Currently it has 175 Insolvency Professional Entities listed on its website.

=== The Governing Board ===
Sl. No.	Position	Name and Designation
1.	Chairperson (2022–Present)	Sh. Ravi Mital, Chairperson, Insolvency and Bankruptcy Board of India
2.	Whole Time Member	Sh. Jayanti Prasad, Whole Time Member, Insolvency and Bankruptcy Board of India.
3.	Whole Time Member	Mr. Sandip Garg, Whole Time Member, Insolvency and Bankruptcy Board of India.
4.	Whole Time Member	Dr. Bhushan Kumar Sinha, Whole Time Member, Insolvency and Bankruptcy Board of India.
5.	Ex-officio Member	Ms. Reetu Jain, Economic Adviser, Department of Economic Affairs, Ministry of Finance
6.	Ex-officio Member	Smt. Anita Shah Akella, Joint Secretary, Ministry of Corporate Affairs
7.	Ex-officio Member	Dr. Anju Rathi Rana, Secretary , Ministry of Law and Justice
8.	Ex-officio Member	Mr. Vaibhav Chaturvedi, Chief General Manager, Reserve Bank of India
9.	Part Time Member	Shri M. P. Ram Mohan, Professor, Indian Institute of Management Ahmedabad
10.	Part Time Member	Shri L. V. Prabhakar, Former MD & CEO, Canara Bank

== See also ==
- List of financial supervisory authorities by country
