= Securitisation and Reconstruction of Financial Assets and Enforcement of Security Interest Act, 2002 =

Act of the Parliament of India

Parliament of India
- Long title: An Act to regulate securitisation and reconstruction of financial assets and enforcement of security interest and for matters connected therewith or incidental thereto
- Citation: Act no. 54 of 2002
- Territorial extent: Whole of India
- Enacted by: Parliament of India
- Enacted: 17 December 2002
- Signed by: President of India
- Commenced: 21 June 2002
- Committee report: Narasimham Committee I and II and Andhyarujina Committee
- Status: In force

The Securitisation and Reconstruction of Financial Assets and Enforcement of Securities Interest Act, 2002 (also known as the SARFAESI Act) is an Indian law. It allows banks and other financial institutions to auction residential or commercial properties of defaulters to recover loans. The first asset reconstruction company (ARC) of India, ARCIL, was set up under this act. By virtue of the SARFAESI Act 2002, the Reserve Bank of India has the authority to register and regulate Asset Reconstruction Companies (ARCs).

Under this act secured creditors (banks or financial institutions) have many rights for enforcement of security interest under section 13 of SARFAESI Act, 2002. If borrower of financial assistance defaults on repayment of a loan and their account is classified as non-performing asset by secured creditor, then secured creditor may repossess the security asset by written notice before expiry of period of limitation.

== Summary ==
The law does not apply to unsecured loans, loans below ₹100,000 or where remaining debt is below 20% of the original principal. This law allowed the creation of asset reconstruction companies (ARC) and allowed banks to sell their non-performing assets to ARCs. Banks are allowed to take possession of the collateral property and sell it without the permission of a court.

== Application of SARFAESI Act 2002 ==
The SARFAESI act applies to the whole of India for the securitisation, reconstruction of financial assets and enforcement of the security interest.

The act applies to all the financial institutions established as securitisation companies or asset reconstruction companies registered by the reserve bank of India.

== Amendments ==
The act was amended by "Enforcement of Security Interest and Recovery of Debts Laws and Miscellaneous Provisions (Amendment) Bill, 2016", passed by Lok Sabha on 2 August 2016. Act passed by Rajya Sabha by voice vote on 10 August 2016.

== Notable verdict ==
=== Mardia Chemicals Ltd. v. ICICI Bank ===
In Mardia Chemicals Ltd. v. ICICI Bank, on 8 April 2004, the Supreme Court of India declared the Sarfaesi Act to be constitutionally valid. The Court said that a borrower may appeal against the lender in the debt recovery tribunal, without having to deposit 75% of the amount of the debt. If the tribunal does not stay the order, the lender may sell the assets.

After this law passed, on 27 November 2002, ICICI Bank took possession of Mardia Chemical plant in Vatva, Ahmedabad district, Gujarat. ICICI Bank was owed ₹300 crore, in all it owed ₹1,450 crore to 20 lenders.

== See also ==
- Central Registry of Securitisation Asset Reconstruction and Security Interest
