= Securities and Exchange Board of India Act, 1992 =

Act of the Parliament of India

Parliament of India
- Long title: An Act to provide for the establishment of a Board to protect the interests of investors in securities and to promote the development of, and to regulate, the securities market and for matters connected therewith or incidental thereto.
- Citation: Act No. 15 of 1992
- Enacted by: Parliament of India
- Enacted: 4 April 1992
- Commenced: 30 January 1992
- Status: In force

The Securities and Exchange Board of India Act, 1992 is a legislation enacted for regulation and development of securities market in India. It was amended in the years 1995, 1999, and 2002 to meet the requirements of changing needs of the securities market.

It was the 15th Act of 1992. The Act provides for the establishment of Securities and Exchange Board of India following the Harshad Mehta scam.

The Act contains 10 chapters and 91 sections.

== Preamble ==
The Securities and Exchange Board of India is the sole regulator of the Indian securities market. Its preamble describes its basic function as "...to protect the interests of investors in securities and to promote the development of, and to regulate the securities market and for matters connected therewith or incidental thereto"

== Management ==
The management of Board is run by its members appointed by the central Government:

1. Chairman
2. Two members from the Ministry of Finance of the Union.
3. One member from the Reserve Bank
4. five other members.

== Functions of Board ==
1. Protect the interest of investors in securities market, regulate the securities market in India.
2. Registering the depositories, investment schemes, mutual funds.
3. Promoting fundamental education needed to invest in securities markets.

== See also ==
- Securities and Exchange Board of India
