= Insurance Regulatory and Development Authority of India =

Regulatory body of the Government of India

- State Emblem of India

- Logo of IRDAI
- Abbreviation: IRDAI
- Formation: 1999
- Type: Regulatory agency
- Legal status: Active
- Headquarters: Sy No. 115/1, Financial District, Nanakramguda, Hyderabad – 500032
- Location: Hyderabad, Telangana
- Coordinates: 17.385°N 78.486°E
- Services: Insurance of India
- Owner: Ministry of Finance, Government of India
- Key people: Ajay Seth, IAS (Chairperson)
- Website: irdai.gov.in

The Insurance Regulatory and Development Authority of India (IRDAI) is an autonomous regulatory agency and a statutory body under the Ministry of Finance, Government of India. It is tasked with regulating and licensing the insurance and re-insurance industries in India. It was constituted by the Insurance Regulatory and Development Authority Act, 1999, an Act of Parliament. The authority was originally named Insurance Regulatory and Development Authority; the words "of India" were added in December 2014.

IRDAI is chaired by Ajay Seth, who took charge in September 2025. Since its creation, it has overseen the gradual opening of India's insurance market to private and foreign companies. The limit on foreign direct investment in the sector was raised to 100% in 2025.

== Establishment ==
In April 1993, the government set up a Committee on Reforms in the Insurance Sector under RN Malhotra, a former governor of the Reserve Bank of India, to recommend reforms in the insurance sector. The sector had been a state monopoly since the nationalisation of the life insurance business in 1956 and the general insurance business in 1972. The committee submitted its report to the finance minister in January 1994, recommending that th sector be opened for private participation under an independent regulator. Following the recommendations, the Parliament passed the 1999 Act, and the authority was incorporated in April 2000. It began opening the market in August 2000, and allowed foreign companies to own up to 26% of an insurance business, the was raised to 100% in 2025. The agency's headquarters are in Hyderabad, Telangana, where it moved from New Delhi in 2001-02.

== Structure ==
The IRDAI and its linked organisations

Section 4 of the IRDAI Act 1999 specifies the authority's composition. It is a ten-member body consisting of a chairman, five full-time and four part-time members appointed by the government of India. At present (July 2025), the authority is chaired by Mr. Ajay Seth and its full-time members are Mrs T.L.Alamelu, K.Ganesh, Pournima Gupte, Praveen Kutumbe and Sujay Banarji.

== Functions ==
The functions of the IRDAI are defined in Section 14 of the IRDAI Act, 1999, and include:

- Issuing, renewing, modifying, withdrawing, suspending or cancelling registrations
- Protecting policyholder interests
- Specifying qualifications, the code of conduct and training for intermediaries and agents
- Specifying the code of conduct for surveyors and loss assessors
- Promoting efficiency in the conduct of insurance businesses
- Promoting and regulating professional organisations connected with the insurance and re-insurance industry
- Levying fees and other charges
- Inspecting and investigating insurers, intermediaries and other relevant organisations
- Regulating rates, advantages, terms and conditions which may be offered by insurers
- Regulating company investment of funds
- Regulating a margin of solvency
- Adjudicating disputes between insurers and intermediaries or insurance intermediaries
- Specifying the percentage of premium income to finance schemes for promoting and regulating professional organisations
- Specifying the percentage of life- and general insurance business undertaken in the rural or social sector
- Specifying the form and the manner in which books of accounts shall be maintained, and statement of accounts shall be rendered by insurers and other insurer intermediaries.

== See also ==
- List of financial supervisory authorities by country
- Securities and Exchange Board of India
