= National Housing Bank (India) =

Indian Supervisory Refinancing Body

- Type: Statutory financial institution
- Industry: Housing Finance Companies
- Founded: 9 July 1988; 38 years ago
- Headquarters: New Delhi, India
- Key people: Sanjay Shukla (Managing Director) Prabhanjan Mohapatra (Chairman)
- Owner: Ministry of Finance, Government of India
- Number of employees: 450+
- Website: www.nhb.org.in

National Housing Bank (NHB) is a statutory financial institution in India. Established under the National Housing Bank Act, 1987, it began operations on 9 July 1988 to promote housing finance institutions and provide them with financial and other support.

In 2019, the Government of India acquired the Reserve Bank of India's entire shareholding in NHB. The Reserve Bank of India took over regulatory powers over housing finance companies, including their registration, on 9 August 2019. NHB continues to supervise housing finance companies.

== History ==
The Sub-Group on Housing Finance for the Seventh Five Year Plan (1985–90) identified the non-availability of long-term finance to individual households on any significant scale as a major lacuna impeding progress of the housing sector and recommended the setting up of a national level institution.

The Committee of Secretaries considered' the recommendation and set up the High Level Group under the Chairmanship of Dr. C. Rangarajan, the then Deputy Governor, RBI to examine the proposal and recommended the setting up of National Housing Bank as an autonomous housing finance institution. The recommendations of the High Level Group were accepted by the Government of India.

The Hon'ble Prime Minister of India, while presenting the Union Budget for 1987–88 on 28 February 1987 announced the decision to establish the National Housing Bank (NHB) as an apex level institution for housing finance. Following that, the National Housing Bank Bill (53 of 1987) providing the legislative framework for the establishment of NHB was passed by Parliament in the winter session of 1987 and with the assent of the Hon’ble President of India on 23 December 1987, became an Act of Parliament.

The National Housing Policy, 1988 envisaged the setting up of NHB as the Apex level institution for housing.

In pursuance of the above, NHB was set up on 9 July 1988 under the National Housing Bank Act, 1987. NHB is wholly owned by Govt. of India as after 24 April 2019 notification of RBI, which contributed the entire paid-up capital. The general superintendence, direction and management of the affairs and business of NHB vest, under the Act, in a board of directors. The Head office of NHB is at New Delhi.
