= Fossil fuel =

Fuel formed naturally from dead plants and animals

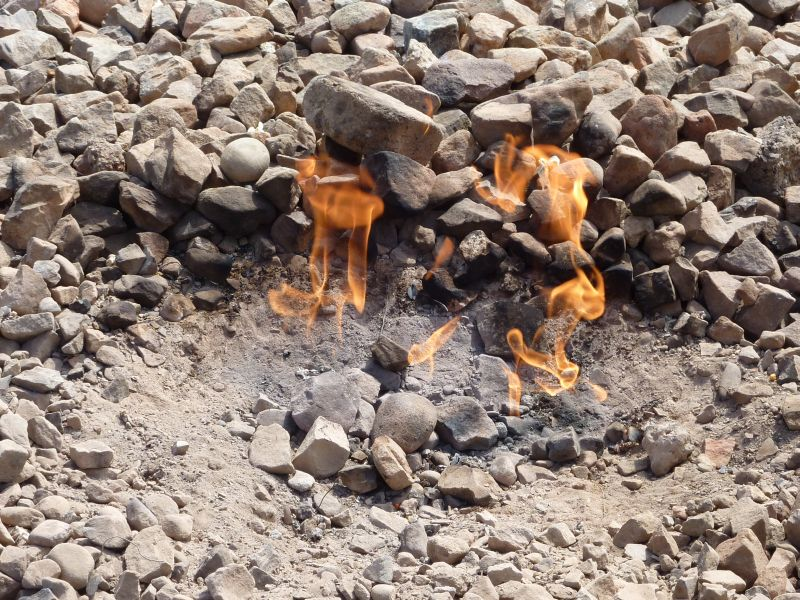
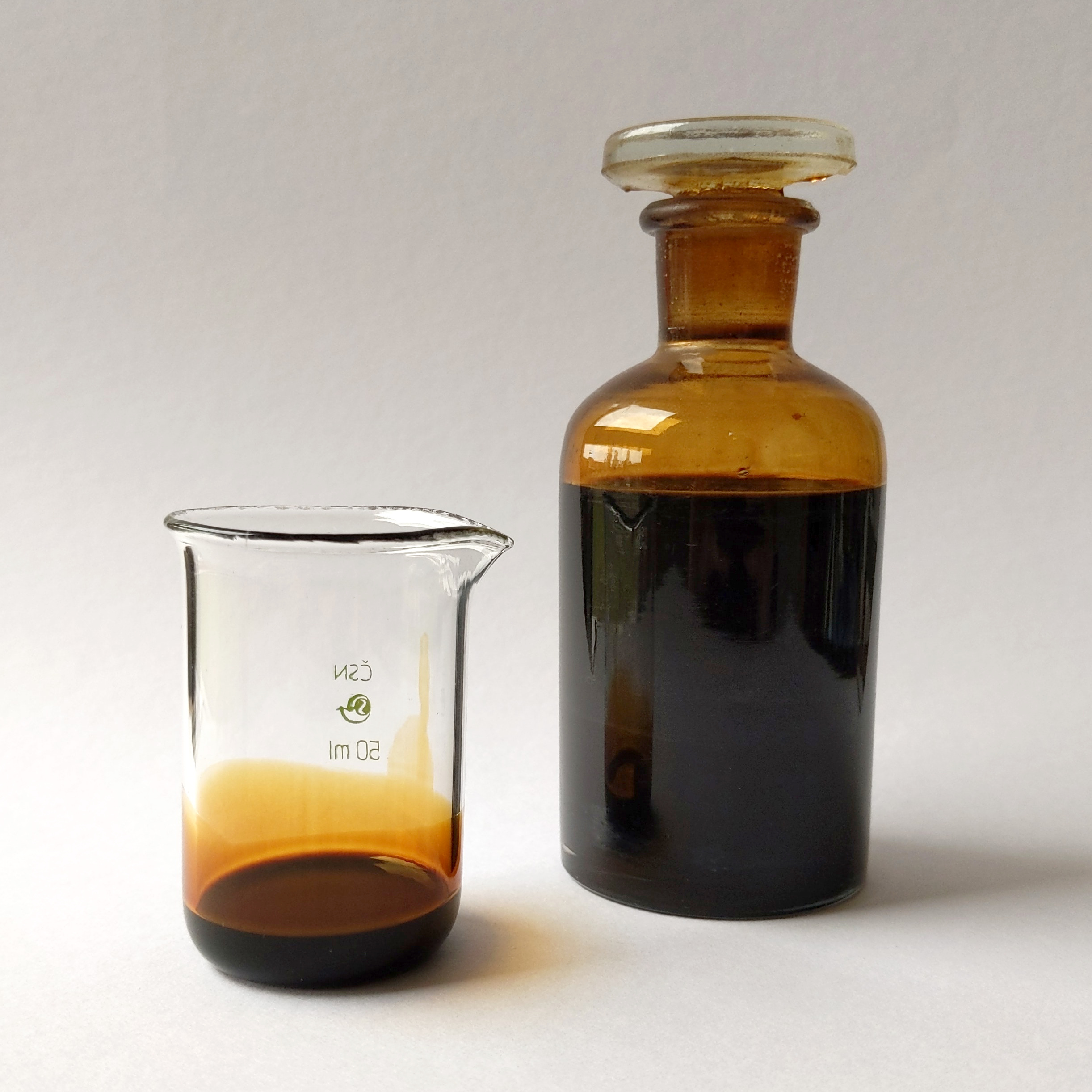
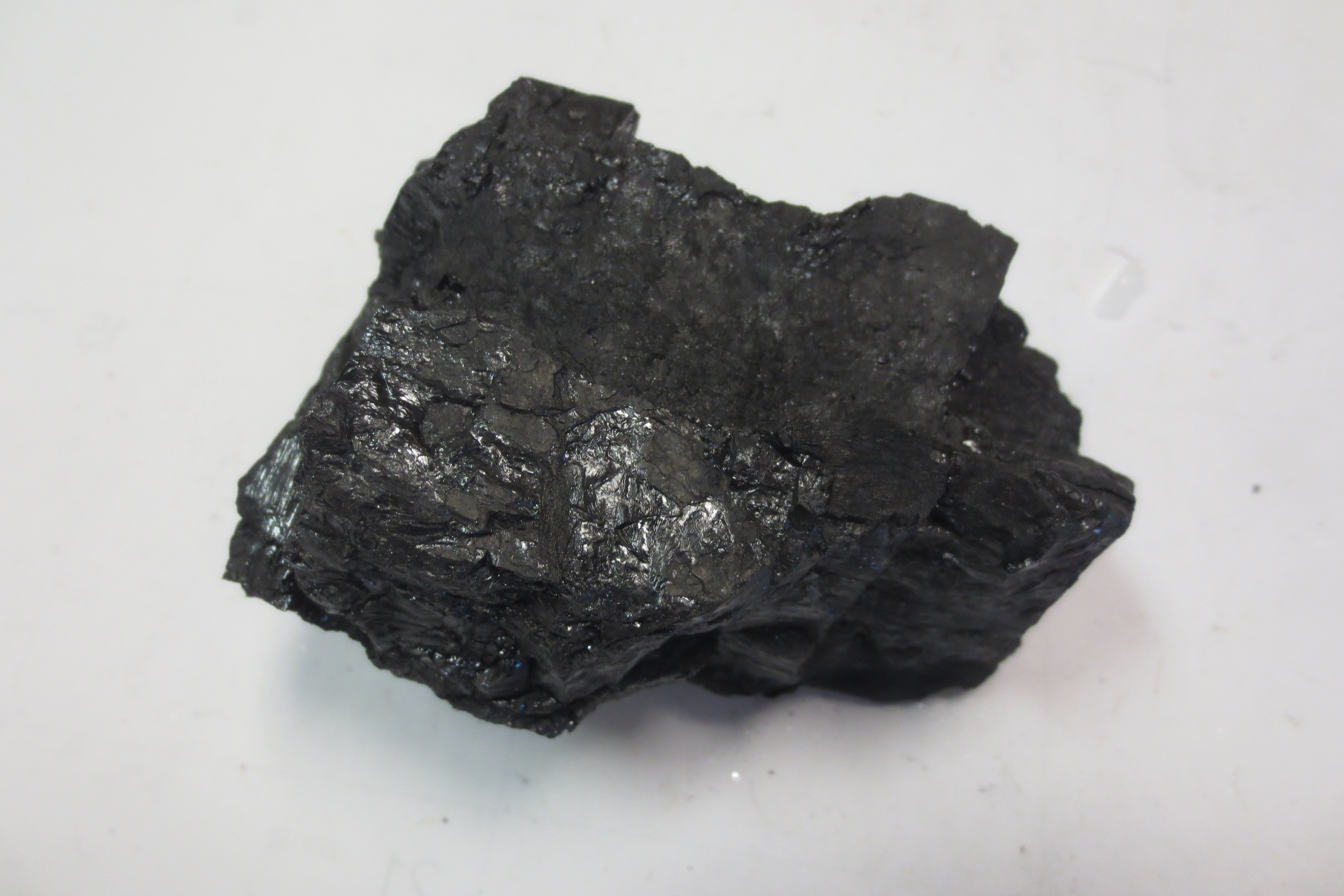
The 3 main fossil fuels (from top to bottom): natural gas, oil (petroleum), and coal

Fossil fuels share energy

A fossil fuel (Note: The term has been considered a misnomer because it does not actually originate from fossils, but from decomposed organic matter.) is a flammable carbon compound- or hydrocarbon-containing material formed naturally in the Earth's crust from the buried remains of prehistoric organisms (animals, plants or microplanktons), a process that occurs within geological formations. Reservoirs of such compound mixtures, such as coal, petroleum and natural gas, can be extracted and burnt as fuel for human consumption to provide energy for direct use (such as for cooking, heating or lighting), to power heat engines (such as steam or internal combustion engines) that can propel vehicles, or to generate electricity via steam turbine generators. Some fossil fuels are further refined into derivatives such as kerosene, gasoline and diesel, or converted into petrochemicals such as polyolefins (plastics), aromatics and synthetic resins.

The origin of fossil fuels is the anaerobic decomposition of buried dead organisms. The conversion from these organic materials to high-carbon fossil fuels is typically the result of a geological process of millions of years. Due to the length of time it takes for them to form, fossil fuels are considered non-renewable resources.

In 2023, 77% of primary energy consumption in the world and over 60% of its electricity supply were from fossil fuels. The large-scale burning of fossil fuels causes serious environmental damage. Over 70% of the greenhouse gas emissions due to human activity in 2022 was carbon dioxide (CO_{2}) released from burning fossil fuels. Natural carbon cycle processes on Earth, mostly absorption by the ocean, can remove only a small part of this, and terrestrial vegetation loss due to deforestation, land degradation and desertification further compounds this deficiency. Therefore, there is a net increase of many billion tonnes of atmospheric CO_{2} per year. Although methane leaks are significant, the burning of fossil fuels is the main source of greenhouse gas emissions causing global warming and ocean acidification. Additionally, most air pollution deaths are due to fossil fuel particulates and noxious gases, and it is estimated that this costs over 3% of the global gross domestic product and that fossil fuel phase-out will save millions of lives each year.

Recognition of the climate crisis, pollution and other negative effects caused by fossil fuels has led to a widespread policy transition and activist movement focused on ending their use in favor of renewable and sustainable energy. Because the fossil-fuel industry is so heavily integrated in the global economy and heavily subsidized, this transition is expected to have significant economic consequences. Many stakeholders argue that this change needs to be a just transition and create policy that addresses the societal burdens created by the stranded assets of the fossil fuel industry. International policy, in the form of United Nations' sustainable development goals for affordable and clean energy and climate action, as well as the Paris Climate Agreement, is designed to facilitate this transition at a global level. In 2021, the International Energy Agency concluded that no new fossil fuel extraction projects could be opened if the global economy and society wants to avoid the worst effects of climate change and meet international goals for climate change mitigation.

== Origin ==
Since oil fields are located only at certain places on Earth, only some countries are oil-independent; the other countries depend on the oil-production capacities of these countries.

The theory that fossil fuels formed from the fossilized remains of dead plants by exposure to heat and pressure in Earth's crust over millions of years was first introduced by Andreas Libavius "in his 1597 Alchemia [Alchymia]" and later by Mikhail Lomonosov "as early as 1757 and certainly by 1763". The first recorded use of the term "fossil fuel" occurs in the work of the German chemist Caspar Neumann, in English translation in 1759. The Oxford English Dictionary notes that, in the phrase "fossil fuel", the adjective "fossil" means "[o]btained by digging; found buried in the earth", which dates to at least 1652, before the English noun "fossil" came to refer primarily to long-dead organisms in the early 18th century.

Aquatic phytoplankton and zooplankton that died and sedimented in large quantities under anoxic conditions millions of years ago began forming petroleum and natural gas as a result of anaerobic decomposition. Over geological time this organic matter, mixed with mud, became buried under further heavy layers of inorganic sediment. The resulting high temperature and pressure caused the organic matter to chemically alter, first into a waxy material known as kerogen, which is found in oil shales, and then with more heat into liquid and gaseous hydrocarbons in a process known as catagenesis. Despite these heat-driven transformations, the energy released in combustion is still photosynthetic in origin.

Terrestrial plants tend to form coal and methane. Many of the coal fields date to the Carboniferous period of Earth's history. Terrestrial plants also form type III kerogen, a source of natural gas. Although fossil fuels are continually formed by natural processes, they are classified as non-renewable resources because they take millions of years to form and known viable reserves are being depleted much faster than new ones are generated.

== Importance ==
Net income of the global oil and gas industry reached a record US$4 trillion in 2022.

After recovering from the COVID-19 pandemic, energy company profits increased with greater revenues from higher fuel prices resulting from the Russian invasion of Ukraine, falling debt levels, tax write-downs of projects shut down in Russia, and backing off from earlier plans to reduce greenhouse gas emissions. Record profits sparked public calls for windfall taxes.

Fossil fuels have been important to human development because they can be readily burned in the open atmosphere to produce heat. The use of peat as a domestic fuel predates recorded history. Coal was burned in some early furnaces for the smelting of metal ore, while semi-solid hydrocarbons from oil seeps were also burned in ancient times, they were mostly used for waterproofing and embalming.

Commercial exploitation of petroleum began in the 19th century.

Natural gas, once flared-off as an unneeded byproduct of petroleum production, is now considered a very valuable resource. Natural gas deposits are also the main source of helium.

Heavy crude oil, which is much more viscous than conventional crude oil, and oil sands, where bitumen is found mixed with sand and clay, began to become more important as sources of fossil fuel in the early 2000s. Oil shale and similar materials are sedimentary rocks containing kerogen, a complex mixture of high-molecular weight organic compounds, which yield synthetic crude oil when heated (pyrolyzed). With additional processing, they can be employed instead of other established fossil fuels. During the 2010s and 2020s there was disinvestment from exploitation of such resources due to their high carbon cost relative to more easily-processed reserves.

Prior to the latter half of the 18th century, windmills and watermills provided the energy needed for work such as milling flour, sawing wood or pumping water, while burning wood or peat provided domestic heat. The wide-scale use of fossil fuels, coal at first and petroleum later, in steam engines enabled the Industrial Revolution. At the same time, gas lights using natural gas or coal gas were coming into wide use. The invention of the internal combustion engine and its use in automobiles and trucks greatly increased the demand for gasoline and diesel oil, both made from fossil fuels. Other forms of transportation, railways and aircraft, also require fossil fuels. The other major use for fossil fuels is in generating electricity and as feedstock for the petrochemical industry. Tar, a leftover of petroleum extraction, is used in the construction of roads.

The energy for the Green Revolution was provided by fossil fuels in the form of fertilizers (natural gas), pesticides (oil), and hydrocarbon-fueled irrigation. The development of synthetic nitrogen fertilizer has significantly supported global population growth; it has been estimated that almost half of the Earth's population are currently fed as a result of synthetic nitrogen fertilizer use. According to head of a fertilizers commodity price agency, "50% of the world's food relies on fertilisers."

== Environmental effects ==
The Global Carbon Project shows how additions to CO_{2} have been caused by different sources ramping up one after another.

The burning of fossil fuels has a number of negative externalities – harmful environmental consequences where the effects extend beyond the people using the fuel. These effects vary between different fuels. All fossil fuels release CO_{2} when they burn, thus accelerating climate change. Burning coal, and to a lesser extent oil and its derivatives, contributes to atmospheric particulate matter, smog and acid rain. Air pollution from fossil fuels in 2018 has been estimated to cost US$2.9 trillion, or 3.3% of the global gross domestic product (GDP).

Global surface temperature reconstruction over the last 2000 years using proxy data from tree rings, corals, and ice cores in blue. Directly observational data is in red, with all data showing a 5 year moving average.

Climate change is largely driven by the release of greenhouse gases like CO_{2}, and the burning of fossil fuels is the main source of these emissions. In most parts of the world climate change is negatively impacting ecosystems. This includes contributing to the extinction of species and reducing people's ability to produce food, thus adding to the problem of world hunger. Continued rises in global temperatures will lead to further adverse effects on both ecosystems and people; the World Health Organization has said that climate change is the greatest threat to human health in the 21st century.

Combustion of fossil fuels generates sulfuric and nitric acids, which fall to Earth as acid rain, impacting both natural areas and the built environment. Monuments and sculptures made from marble and limestone are particularly vulnerable, as the acids dissolve calcium carbonate.

Fossil fuels also contain radioactive materials, mainly uranium and thorium, which are released into the atmosphere. In 2000, about 12,000 tonnes of thorium and 5,000 tonnes of uranium were released worldwide from burning coal. It is estimated that during 1982, US coal burning released 155 times as much radioactivity into the atmosphere as the Three Mile Island accident.

Burning coal also generates large amounts of bottom ash and fly ash. These materials are used in a wide variety of applications (see Fly ash reuse), utilizing, for example, about 40% of the United States production.

In addition to the effects that result from burning, the harvesting, processing, and distribution of fossil fuels also have environmental effects. Coal mining methods, particularly mountaintop removal and strip mining, have negative environmental impacts, and offshore oil drilling poses a hazard to aquatic organisms. Fossil fuel wells can contribute to methane release via fugitive gas emissions. Oil refineries also have negative environmental impacts, including air and water pollution. Coal is sometimes transported by diesel-powered locomotives, while crude oil is typically transported by tanker ships, requiring the combustion of additional fossil fuels.

Annual CO_{2} emissions by region. This measures fossil fuel and industry emissions. Land use change is not included.

A variety of mitigating efforts have arisen to counter the negative effects of fossil fuels. This includes a movement to use alternative energy sources, such as renewable energy. Environmental regulation uses a variety of approaches to limit these emissions; for example, rules against releasing waste products like fly ash into the atmosphere.

Global fossil fuel emissions are expected to decrease slightly in 2026 due to disruptions from the U.S. war with Iran, prompting many countries to use less oil and gas. Emissions are projected at around 38.2 billion tons of carbon dioxide in 2026, a decrease of about 0.4 percent from 2025. The rise in global fuel prices from conflicts like the wars in the Middle East and Ukraine led nations to seek alternatives. However, coal emissions are predicted to rise by 0.6 percent, with significant increases in China and India. The use of fossil fuel was the main issue of the 2026 United Nations Climate Change Conference, where most attending nation called to end using it.

== Inflation effects ==
Fossilflation is a term that describes the impact of fossil fuels on inflation.

According to Vox in August 2022, "Economists have pointed to energy prices as the main reason for high inflation", noting that "energy prices indirectly affect virtually every part of the economy". Sectors that raise prices significantly as a result of higher fossil fuel prices include transportation, food, and shipping.

=== History ===
Mark Zandi of Moody's says that fossil fuel prices have driven every big episode of inflation since WWII.

The economic impact of the Russian Invasion of Ukraine in 2022 was a major recent example of fossil fuels causing inflation. Some economists, including Isabel Schnabel, believe that dependence on fossil fuels is the main driver of the 2021–2022 inflation spike.

=== Efforts to combat fossilflation ===
Gernot Wagner argues that commodities are undesirable energy sources because they are susceptible to volatile price swings that technologies like renewable energy are not. He also argues that technologies improve and get relatively cheaper over time. Coming out of the COVID-19 pandemic, some argued for the possibility of a base effect phenomenon due to cheaper than normal prices, such as for oil, at the onset of the pandemic, followed by above-average prices which exacerbated the perceived inflation.

=== Inflation Reduction Act ===
While not expected to provide much short-term relief, the Inflation Reduction Act seeks to make the United States less dependent on fossil fuels and their ability to cause inflation in the economy. Moody's estimates that by 2030, the bill could reduce the typical American household's spending on energy by more than $300 each year, in 2022 dollars.

== Illness and deaths ==
Deaths caused as a result of fossil fuel use (areas of rectangles in chart) greatly exceed those resulting from production of renewable energy (rectangles barely visible in chart).

Environmental pollution from fossil fuels impacts humans because particulates and other air pollution from fossil fuel combustion may cause illness and death when inhaled. These health effects include premature death, acute respiratory illness, aggravated asthma, chronic bronchitis and decreased lung function. The poor, undernourished, very young and very old, and people with preexisting respiratory disease and other ill health are more at risk. Global air pollution deaths due to fossil fuels have been estimated at over 8 million people (2018, nearly 1 in 5 deaths worldwide) at 10.2 million (2019), and 5.13 million excess deaths from ambient air pollution from fossil fuel use (2023).

While all energy sources inherently have adverse effects, the data show that fossil fuels cause the highest levels of greenhouse gas emissions and are the most dangerous for human health. In contrast, modern renewable energy sources appear to be safer for human health and cleaner. The death rates from accidents and air pollution in the EU are as follows per terawatt-hour (TWh):

Energy source	Nos. of deaths per TWh	Greenhouse gas emissions (thousand tonnes/TWh)
Coal	24.6	820
Oil	18.4	720
Natural gas	2.8	490
Biomass	4.6	78–230
Hydropower	0.02	34
Nuclear energy	0.07	3
Wind	0.04	4
Solar	0.02	5

As the data shows, coal, oil, natural gas, and biomass cause higher death rates and higher levels of greenhouse gas emissions than hydropower, nuclear energy, wind, and solar power. Scientists propose that 1.8 million lives have been saved by replacing fossil fuel sources with nuclear power.

== Phase-out ==
Investment in clean energy 2015-2025, compared to fossil fuels. As of 2025, investment in clean energy is about twice that for fossil fuels (oil, natural gas and coal).

Investment: Companies, governments and households have been investing increasing amounts in decarbonisation, including renewable energy, electric vehicles and associated infrastructure, energy storage, energy-efficient heating systems, carbon capture and storage, and hydrogen energy.

Fossil fuel phase-out is the proposed gradual global reduction of the use and production of fossil fuels to zero, to reduce air pollution, limit climate change, and strengthen energy independence. It is part of the ongoing renewable energy transition.

=== Just transition ===
Just transition is a concept that emerged in the 1980s through efforts by U.S. trade unions to protect workers' rights and livelihoods as economies shift to sustainable production, primarily protecting workers affected by environmental regulations. Since then, it has evolved and gained global recognition, including having a place in the Paris Agreement in 2015. A just transition focuses on the connection between energy transition and equitable approaches to decarbonization that support broader development goals. A growing number of countries are incorporating just transition strategies to achieve ambitious climate goals, with 38% of 170 countries referring to just transition in their short-term climate plans as of 2022.

=== Divestment ===
As of 2021, 1,300 institutions possessing US$14.6 trillion have divested from the fossil fuel industry.

Fossil fuel divestment or fossil fuel divestment and investment in climate solutions is an attempt to reduce climate change by exerting social, political, and economic pressure for the institutional divestment of assets including stocks, bonds, and other financial instruments connected to companies involved in extracting fossil fuels.

Fossil fuel divestment campaigns emerged on college and university campuses in the United States in 2011 with students urging their administrations to turn endowment investments in the fossil fuel industry into investments in clean energy and communities most impacted by climate change. In 2012, Unity College in Maine became the first institution of higher learning to divest its endowment from fossil fuels. While fossil fuel divestment focusses on financial asset management, a related movement, Fossil Free Research, campaigns for universities to stop accepting research funding and sponsorships from fossil fuel companies.

By 2015, fossil fuel divestment was reportedly the fastest growing divestment movement in history. As of July 2023, more than 1593 institutions with assets totalling more than $40.5 trillion in assets worldwide had begun or committed some form of divestment of fossil fuels.

Divesters cite several reasons for their decisions. To some, it is a means of aligning investments with core values; to others, it is a tactic for combatting the fossil fuel industry; to others, it is a way to protect portfolios from climate-related financial risk. Financial research suggests that, in the longer term, fossil fuel divestment has positively impacted investors' returns.

== Industrial sector ==
In 2019, Saudi Aramco was listed and it reached a US$2 trillion valuation on its second day of trading, after the world's largest initial public offering.

=== Subsidies ===
Fossil fuel subsidies are energy subsidies on fossil fuels. Under a narrow definition, fossil fuel subsidies totalled around $725 billion (0.6% of global GDP) to $900 billion in 2024. Under a more expansive definition, they totalled $6.7 trillion (5.8% of GDP). Most subsidy is for oil and natural gas. Subsidies are mainly on consumption, such as a lower sales tax on natural gas for residential heating; or subsidies on production, such as tax breaks on exploration for oil. Or they may be free or cheap negative externalities; such as air pollution or climate change due to burning gasoline, diesel and jet fuel. Some fossil fuel subsidies are via electricity generation, such as subsidies for coal-fired power stations.

Eliminating fossil fuel subsidies would reduce the health risks of air pollution, and would greatly reduce global carbon emissions thus helping to limit climate change. As of 2021, policy researchers estimate that substantially more money is spent on fossil fuel subsidies than on environmentally harmful agricultural subsidies or environmentally harmful water subsidies. The International Energy Agency says: "High fossil fuel prices hit the poor hardest, but subsidies are rarely well-targeted to protect vulnerable groups and tend to benefit better-off segments of the population."

Despite the G20 countries having pledged to phase-out inefficient fossil fuel subsidies, they continue because of voter demand, or for energy security. However the International Institute for Sustainable Development says that, done carefully, phasing-out fossil fuel subsidies would increase energy security.

=== Lobbying activities ===
The fossil fuels lobby includes paid representatives of corporations involved in the fossil fuel industry (oil, gas, coal), as well as related industries like chemicals, plastics, aviation and other transportation. Because of their wealth and the importance of energy, transport and chemical industries to local, national and international economies, these lobbies have the capacity and money to attempt to have outsized influence on governmental policy. In particular, the lobbies promote climate change denial and obstruct policy related to environmental protection, environmental health and climate action.

For example, after climate change became a public topic, the fossil fuel lobby began a massive public relations campaign to undermine public understanding of climate change and block meaningful policy action. Since then, the fossil fuel industry has actively denied and cast doubt on climate science, confused the public and politicians, and prevented climate and clean energy policies through disinformation, lobbying, and propaganda and continues to do so, for example by falsely claiming there is no climate consensus among scientists.

Lobbies are active in most fossil-fuel intensive economies with democratic governance, with reporting on the lobbies most prominent in Canada, Australia, the United States and Europe; however, the lobbies are present in many parts of the world. Big Oil companies such as ExxonMobil, Shell, BP, TotalEnergies, Chevron Corporation, and ConocoPhillips are among the largest corporations associated with the fossil fuels lobby. The American Petroleum Institute is a powerful industry lobbyist for Big Oil with significant influence in Washington, D.C. In Australia, Australian Energy Producers, formerly known as the Australian Petroleum Production and Exploration Association (APPEA), has significant influence in Canberra and helps to maintain favorable policy settings for Oil and Gas.

The presence of major fossil fuel companies and national oil companies at global forums for decision making, like the Intergovernmental Panel on Climate Change, Paris Climate Agreement negotiations, and United Nations Climate Change conferences has been criticised. The lobby is known for exploiting international crises, such as the COVID-19 pandemic, or the 2022 Russian invasion of Ukraine, to try to roll back existing regulations or justify new fossil fuel development. Lobbyists try to retain fossil fuel subsidies.

== See also ==
- Abiogenic petroleum origin – a proposal that petroleum is not a fossil fuel
- Bioremediation
- Carbon bubble
- Eco-economic decoupling
- Environmental impact of the energy industry
- Fossil Fools Day
- Fossil Fuel Beta
- Hydraulic fracturing
- Liquefied petroleum gas
- Low-carbon power
- Peak coal
- Peak gas
- Phase-out of fossil fuel vehicles
- Shale gas
