= Ways and Means (disambiguation) =

Ways and Means is the name of a government body that is charged with reviewing and making recommendations for government budgets.

Ways and Means may also refer to:

== Arts ==
- "Ways and Means" (The West Wing), an episode of the television series The West Wing
- Ways and Means (Coward play), a short 1935 play by Noël Coward
- Ways and Means (Colman play), a 1788 play by George Colman the Younger
- Ways and Means (Xenophon), believed to be the last work written by Xenophon of Athens
- "Ways and Means" (Porridge), an episode of the BBC sitcom Porridge

=== Music ===
- The Ways and Means, a 1960s UK group
- Ways & Means (album) an album by Paul Kelly
- "Ways and Means" (poem), a song by Lewis Carroll
- "Ways and Means", a song by Snow Patrol from their 2003 album Final Straw

== See also ==
- Ways and means advances, Reserve Bank of India credit facility
