= Impact of the COVID-19 pandemic on Indian migrant workers =

Impact of COVID-19 on Indian migrants

Indian migrant workers during the COVID-19 pandemic
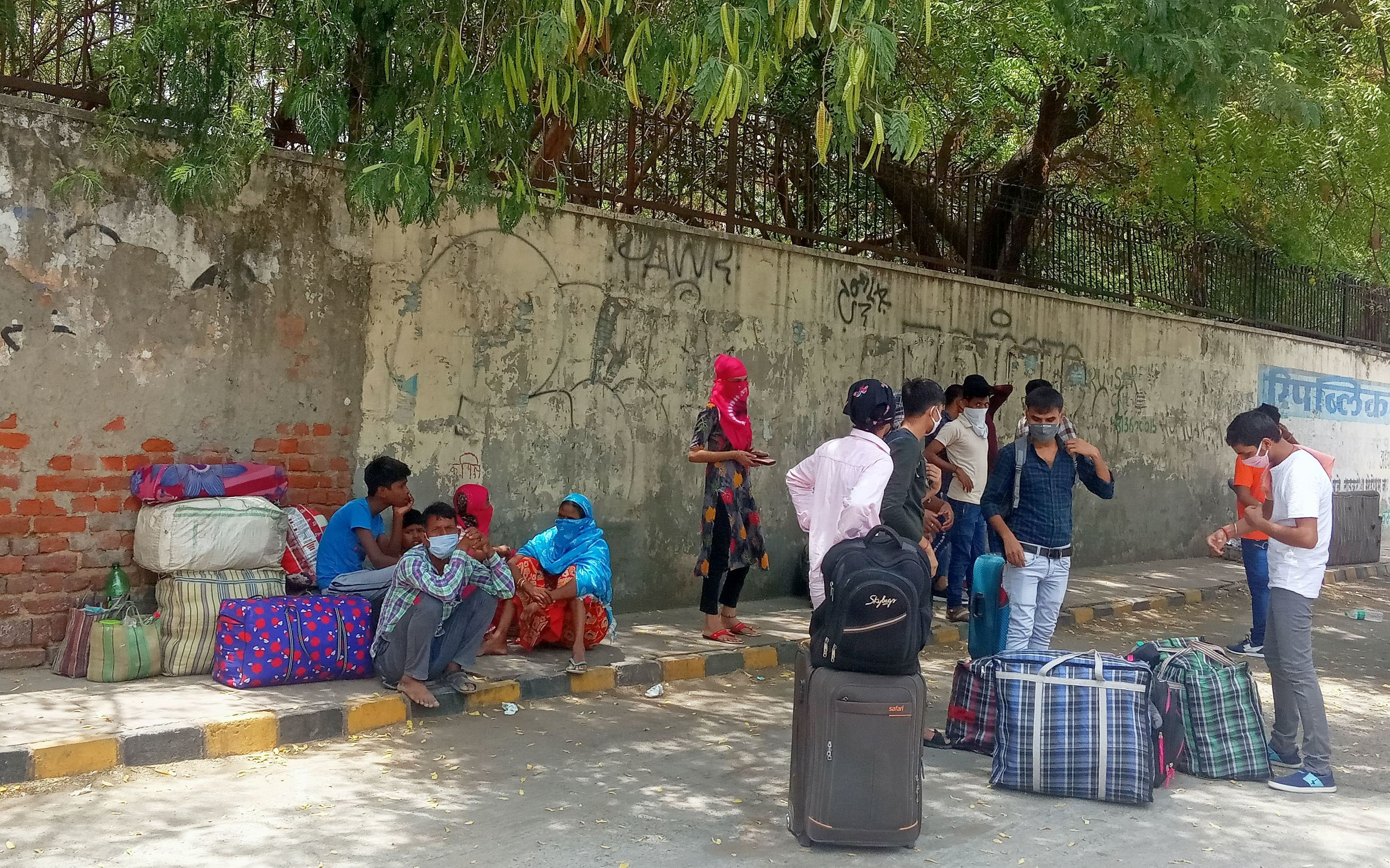
- Stranded migrant workers during fourth phase of the lockdown near Paharganj
- Date: 28 March 2020 onwards
- Cause: COVID-19 pandemic-induced lockdown
- Outcome: Sharp rise in unemployment; Starvation; Exodus to hometowns and villages; Shramik Special trains

Indian migrant workers during the COVID-19 pandemic faced multiple hardships. With factories and workplaces shut down due to the lockdown imposed in the country, millions of migrant workers had to deal with the loss of income, food shortages and uncertainty about their future. Following this, many of them and their families went hungry. Thousands of them then began walking back home, with no means of transport due to the lockdown. A study found that 43.3 million interstate migrants returned to their home during the first wave of COVID-19 led lockdowns and out of 43.3 million around 35 million walked home or used unusual means of transportation. In response, the Central and State Governments took various measures to help them, and later arranged transport for them. 198 migrant workers died due to the lockdown, with reasons of road accidents.

== Background ==
There are an estimated 139 million migrants in the country, according to the World Economic Forum. The International Labour Organization (ILO) predicted that due to the pandemic and the lockdown, about 400 million workers would be poverty-stricken. Most migrants in the country originate from Uttar Pradesh and Bihar, followed by Rajasthan and Madhya Pradesh. The cities of Mumbai and Delhi attract the highest number of migrants in India. While most men migrate for work, women migrate due to marriage.

Migrant workers consist majorly of daily-wage labourers working in the manufacturing and construction industries. They are often denied adequate healthcare, nutrition, housing and sanitation, since many of them work in the informal sector. They mostly hail from rural areas but live in cities due to work for most of the year. Many have no savings and stayed in factory dormitories, which were shut due to the lockdown. Additionally, there was no central registry of migrant workers, despite the existence of the Inter-State Migrant Workmen Act, 1979.

According to research published in the Royal Geographical Society, the workers who have been treated the worst are from areas like Odisha, Jharkhand and Chhattisgarh, in which the indigenous population's natural resources were extracted by outsiders. Further, workers paid the least for the hardest work belong to the backward classes, mainly from the Dalit and the Adivasi communities. The research also indicated that the families of the migrant workers supported them by maintaining their houses and taking care of them, either when seasonal work is unavailable or when they are no longer able to work.

Maharashtra has the largest number of migrants, according to the 2011 Census of India. Its state government imposed a lockdown on 20 March 2020 in Pune, Pimpri-Chinchwad, the Mumbai Metropolitan Region and Nagpur, leaving the migrant workers with no work. Due to the lockdown, thousands then gathered at the train and bus stations, seeking transport to their hometowns but with the nationwide lockdown in place, all transport facilities were closed.

== Food shortages ==
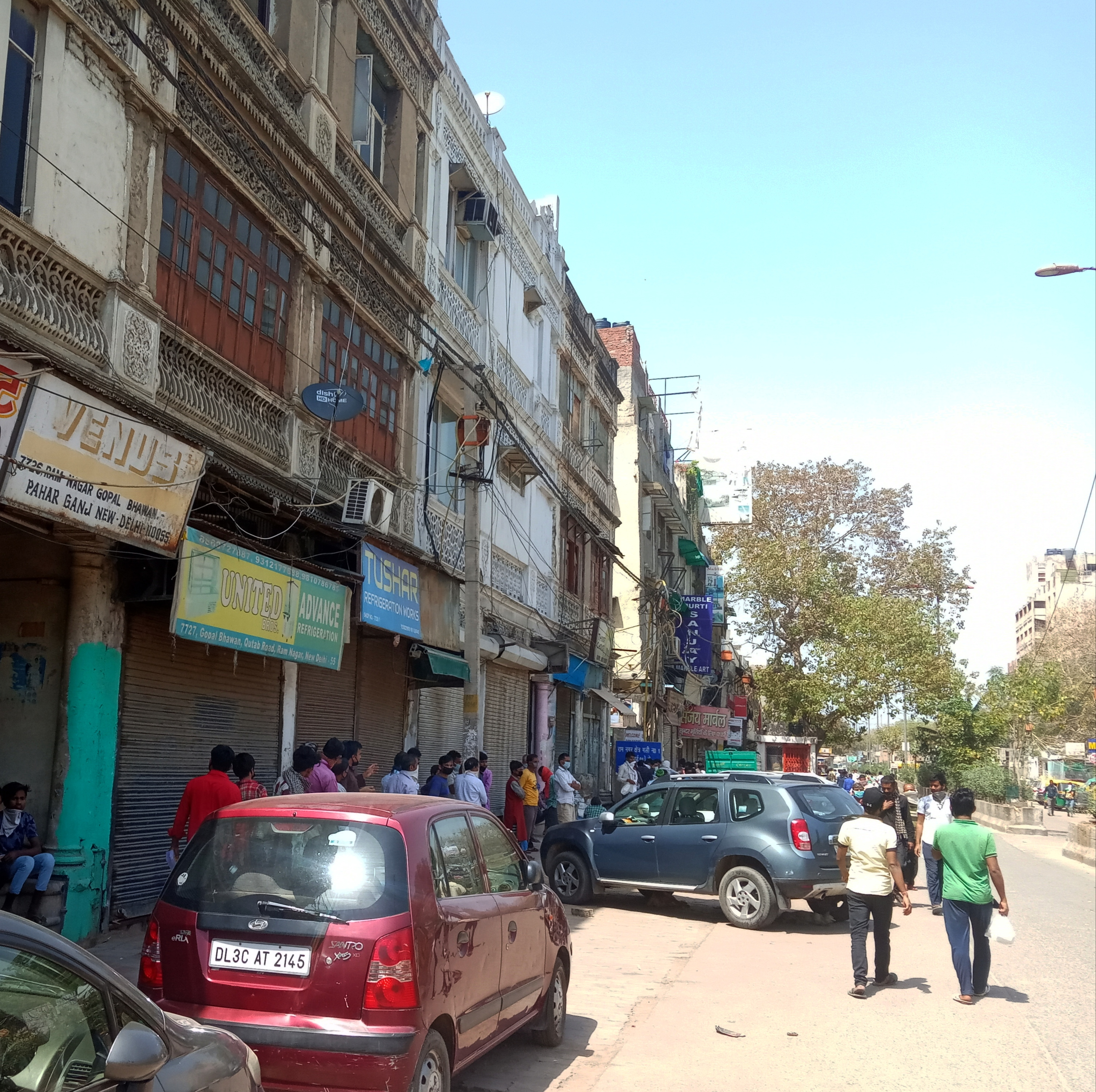
Migrant workers stand in a queue for food at a Delhi Government school during COVID-19 lockdown at Delhi

According to government reports, there was enough food grain stocked up in the FCI godowns to feed the poor for at least a year-and-a-half. While government schemes ensured that the poor would get additional rations due to the lockdown, the distribution system failed to be effective as the ration cards are area-specific and fair price shops were largely inaccessible. Additionally, the 'One Nation, One Ration Card' system has been implemented in very few states, as of mid April. While the scheme allowed migrant workers to retrieve foodgrains for free anywhere across the country, very few were aware of the scheme. In addition to this, the scheme also required biometric authentication, which was discontinued due to fears of spreading the virus through common fingerprint sensors. In Telangana, many could not avail the ration due to a lack of Aadhaar cards. As such, many were left without food and money due to the lockdown. A survey published by ‘The Hindu’ states that 96% migrant workers did not get rations from the government, and 90% of them did not receive wages during the lockdown.

== Exodus ==
On 14 September 2020, Labour and Employment Minister Santosh Kumar Gangwar stated in Parliament that information collected from state governments indicated an estimated 10 million migrants had attempted to return home as a result of the COVID-19 pandemic and consequent lockdown. He later stated in Parliament on 15 September 2020 that no data was maintained on the number of migrants in the country who had either died, or become unemployed, as a result of the pandemic.

With no work and no money, and lockdown restrictions putting a stop to public transport, thousands of migrant workers were seen walking or bicycling hundreds of kilometres (or even more than a thousand kilometres) to go back to their native villages, some with their families. Many did so while hungry. Social distancing was not possible for these migrants since they travelled together in large groups. According to some of them, they would rather die from the virus at their own village than starve because of no work in the city.

Many were arrested for violating the lockdown, after being caught at inter-state borders, forests between states and even on boats to cross rivers. Some of the migrants died of exhaustion. Others died in accidents on the roads after walking or hiding in vehicles. On 31 March, as many as 120 migrant workers were allegedly beaten up by the police in Gujarat and forcefully rounded up in a single lorry and dropped in Maharashtra, despite being wounded. In Aurangabad, 16 migrants were killed on 8 May after a freight train ran over them while they were sleeping on the tracks, exhausted from walking. 26 migrants were killed in an accident between two trucks carrying migrants in Auraiya on 16 May. Later in May, a 15-year-old girl carried her ailing father on a bicycle for 1,200 kilometres (750 mi) from Bihar to Gurugram over the course of a week. She was later approached to try out for the National Cycling Academy by the Cycling Federation of India.

Later in May, despite the launching of special trains and buses by the government, the migrant workers chose to either travel together in large groups in the cargo compartments of trucks and containers, or travel by foot. They did not wait or their turn to board the government-arranged transport, mainly due to starvation. Additionally, they felt that going back to their hometowns, they could return to farming and take up small jobs under the MGNREGA. The consumption of mobile and broadband data under BharatNet more than doubled in rural areas.

In September 2020, Minister of State for Home Affairs Nityanand Rai stated that the exodus of migrant workers had been caused by "panic created by fake news regarding the duration of lockdown."

== Reverse exodus ==
Despite government promises and schemes to generate employment in rural areas, some migrant workers began going back to the cities due to lack of employment in their hometowns, as lockdown restrictions were reduced as part of Unlock 1.0 in June. A large number of these were returning to Mumbai. The reopening of the regular services of the railways also helped facilitate this. The cities, too, reported major shortages of labour, especially in the construction industry. A study conducted in April–May stated that 77% migrant workers were prepared to return to cities for work. The return of the migrants to cities is expected to help revive the economy, which had sustained an impact. Some employers sponsored the travel of migrants back to their workplaces. This included taxis, trains and even flights.

== Government response ==
=== Directives ===
On 27 March, the Home Ministry ordered the states to ensure that migrants would not move during the lockdown, permitting the states to use the National Disaster Response Fund (NDRF) for providing food and shelter to the migrants on 28 March.

On 29 March, the government issued sweeping orders directing that the landlords should not demand rent during the period of the lockdown and that employers should pay wages without deduction. It also announced that those who violated the lockdown were to be sent to government-run quarantine facilities for 14 days, and that it had asked state governments to set up immediate relief camps for the migrant workers returning to their native states. However, the order regarding payment of wages was withdrawn in the guidelines for the lockdown extension issued on 17 May.

On 16 May, the government announced the National Migrant Information System (NMIS), an online database created by the National Disaster Management Authority (NDMA). This was to help streamline the movement of the migrant workers. It will help states find the current number of stranded migrant workers and their location. The government planned to keep the workers updated by feeding their phone numbers in the system.

On 14 July, the Ministry of Human Resource Development requested the state governments to create a database of children in rural areas who have migrated.

=== Relief camps ===
Soon after the central government directive in late March, state governments set up thousands of camps to house lakhs of migrants and stop the exodus. Delhi government provided free food to 4 lakh people every day, as of late March. Over 500 hunger relief centres were set up by the Delhi government. By 5 April 75 lakh people were being provided food across the country in food camps run by the government and NGOs. As of 12 April, 37,978 relief camps and 26,225 food camps had been set up.

To cater to the needs of the migrants and prevent them from leaving the camps, the government of Kerala changed the food being provided by adding north Indian dishes to the menu, providing carrom boards and recharge facilities for phones, as well as provide other medical essentials such as masks, sanitizers, and medicines.

=== Transport arrangements ===
As of 28 May 9.1 million migrants had travelled back home in government-arranged transport facilities. However, according to the Stranded Workers Action Network (SWAN), migrants were confused about the exact procedures to register themselves for travel. Additionally, many state registration portals were either in English or the local language of the states they lived in, which very few migrants could understand. Further, general lack of information from the government to the migrants had resulted in them paying large sums of money to register themselves.

==== Buses ====
In late March, the Uttar Pradesh government decided to arrange buses at Delhi's Anand Vihar bus station to take the migrants back to their villages for free. Large crowds then gathered at the bus station. However, with the extension of the lockdown, many remained stranded till the last week of April, when the state governments were permitted by the central government to operate buses, but not trains. As of 23 May 4 million migrants had travelled to their homes by buses. Condition in the buses is generally poor, with social distancing being impossible due to overcrowding and higher fares being charged than promised.

==== Shramik Special trains ====
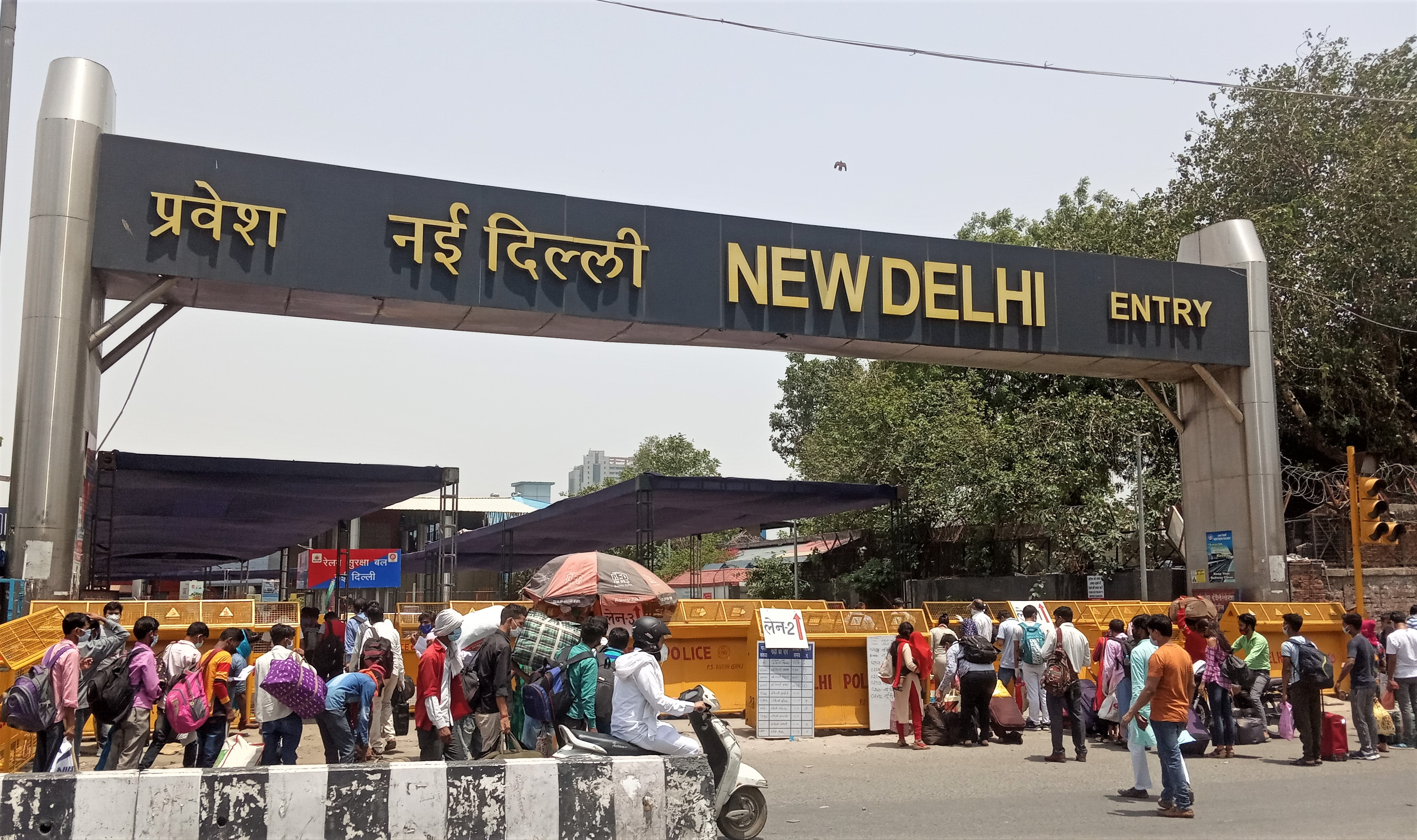
Stranded migrant worker rushing to New Delhi railway station to reach native village by "Shramik Special" train

On 1 May, the central government permitted the Indian Railways to launch "Shramik Special" trains for the migrant workers and others stranded. On 3 May, the Ministry of Home Affairs mildly reprimanded the state governments for hurriedly requesting for trains to transport migrants, stating that the trains were primarily mainly meant for those who were stranded due to the sudden lockdown, and not the migrants. Additionally, this service was not free, with additional charges over the normal fares. The central government then faced criticism from the opposition, with the Indian National Congress promising to sponsor the tickets of the migrants on 4 May. The government then announced that the Railways would offer an 85% subsidy on the train fares, with the state governments funding the remaining 15%. However, the migrants were still forced to pay an undisclosed amount in some cases. The central government initially declined to share the details regarding this with the Supreme Court, but later confirmed that it was not paying for anyone's fare. Additionally, the central governments directives regarding which states should pay for the migrants' travel resulted in disagreement between Maharashtra and other states.

A few days after the Shramik Special trains were introduced, the Karnataka government cancelled the trains (reportedly supporting the construction industry) and the Bihar government did the same to trains coming from Kerala (refusing to provide a No-Objection Certificate). The two states later reverted their decisions.

Further, migrants faced many hardships while travelling by these trains. Many reported to have no food and water arranged for them while they travelled. A train from Goa to Manipur reported a 58-hour delay, no proper food or sanitation facilities on the train, and stone pelting. Others who received food packets and water reported that the provisions were simply dumped at the entrances, leaving workers fighting with each other for their share. Some migrants also died during the train journeys, but the Railways stated that most of them had existing illnesses. According to Railway Protection Force, there have been almost 80 deaths on board the Shramik Special trains between 9 and 27 May. In addition, these trains spread the coronavirus around the country.

50% of the coaches converted into COVID-19 care centres were used for these trains. As per a report given by the Indian Railways on 23 May, migrant labourers from Bihar and Uttar Pradesh were 80% of the train travellers. Additionally, it was expected that 36 lakh migrants would be travelling in the ten days after the report. 4,277 Shramik Special trains had transported about 60 lakh people, as of 12 June.

=== Relief measures ===
Soon after the nationwide lockdown was announced in late March, Finance Minister Nirmala Sitharaman announced a ₹1.7 lakh crore (US$18 billion) spending plan for the poor. This consisted of cash transfers and steps to ensure food security. By 3 April, the central government had released ₹11,092 crore to states and UTs under the NDRF, to fund food and shelter arrangements for migrants. To help provide jobs and wages to workers, the average daily wages under the MGNREGA were increased to ₹202 (US$2.20) from the earlier ₹182 (US$1.90), as of 1 April. ₹1,000 crore from the PM CARES Fund was allocated for the support of migrant workers on 13 May. On 14 May, FM Sitharaman further announced free food grains for the migrant workers, targeting 80 million migrant workers by spending ₹35 billion (US$370 million).

The government of India launched the Garib Kalyan Rojgar Abhiyaan initiative to tackle the impact of COVID-19 on migrant workers in India. It is a rural public works scheme which was launched on 20 June 2020 with an initial funding of ₹50,000 crore (equivalent to ₹640 billion or US$6.9 billion in 2026) for 116 districts in 6 states.

=== Labour laws ===
The governments of Uttar Pradesh, Madhya Pradesh and Gujarat sought to temporarily revise their labour laws in early May with the purpose of attracting industries and investments. Labour unions criticized this as being harmful to the migrant workers while giving more authority to the employers. Ten of them then wrote to the ILO on 14 May regarding the same, to which the ILO responded by reassuring them that it had contacted Prime Minister Narendra Modi.

=== Quarantine measures ===
Many states reported high numbers of positive cases of COVID-19 among the migrants returning home as lockdown restrictions eased. State governments opened thousands of quarantine centres to house them, with some states imposing mandatory institutional quarantine. States also imposed strict measures for migrants to follow, either while leaving or after entering state borders.

== Conduct towards migrant workers ==
"In the cities they treat us like stray dogs. Why would they treat us any better now?"

— A migrant worker describing the treatment he received on a "Shramik Special" train

Migrant workers who decided to stay back during the exodus faced assault from their neighbours, who accused them of being infected with coronavirus. They thus could not venture out to buy food. Many also faced police brutality if they ventured out of their homes.

Upon their return to their hometowns and villages, they were treated with either fear or a "class bias", being hosed down with disinfectants or soap solution in some cases. They were feared to be carrying coronavirus from the urban areas where they had been employed. They faced assault and harassment from the people of their hometowns. Since many of them belonged to the lower castes, they had to face caste slurs. Thousands got into property disputes.

Migrants travelling by Shramik Special trains reported that food and water provisions were either not provided or simply dumped at the entrances of the trains, leaving workers fighting with each other to get their share. Passengers then hurriedly filled their water bottles at the railway stations that the trains stopped at.

Many migrant workers expressed a fear of returning to their old jobs in the cities, after facing unemployment during the lockdown. Companies reported labour shortages from mid-April. Estimates state that this would last for at least another six months.

== Supreme Court hearing ==
The Supreme Court of India agreed to hear a petition on behalf of the migrant workers on 30 March. The Court asked the central government to file a status report with respect to the situation of migrant workers. In its report, the central government stated that the migrant workers, apprehensive about their survival, moved in the panic created by fake news that the lockdown would last for more than three months. The court added that it was satisfied by the government response thus far.

A plea requesting payment of minimum wage was rejected by the Court on 21 April, on the grounds of workers already being provided free meals.

On 16 May, the Supreme Court rejected a PIL to direct the District magistrates to identify and provide free relief and transport to the migrant workers, stating that it was the responsibility of the state governments. Speaking about the workers killed sleeping on the Aurangabad railway tracks, the Court stated that it could not have been prevented. Further, the central government stated that inter-state transport had already been provided to the migrants and requested them to wait their turn instead of choosing to walk.

On 26 May, the Supreme Court admitted that the problems of the migrants had still not been solved and that there had been "inadequacies and certain lapses" on the part of the governments. It thus ordered the Centre and States to provide free food, shelter and transport to stranded migrant workers. Hours before this ruling, senior lawyers from Mumbai and Delhi wrote a strongly-worded letter to the Court, regarding its "self-effacing deference" towards the government thus far.

== Deaths ==
"The rich will get all the help, getting rescued and brought home in planes from abroad. But we poor migrant labourers have been left to fend for ourselves. That is the worth of our lives."

— A weeping migrant worker stuck in Delhi, who could not see his dying son in Bihar

The Ministry of Labour and Employment stated in September 2020, in Parliament, that the Government of India had not maintained any data on the number of migrant worker deaths that occurred during the COVID-19 pandemic in India. Unofficial estimates have been prepared by a number of sources. A group of independent researchers were quoted by News18 as stating that 971 deaths not directly caused by COVID-19 diagnoses had occurred as of July 2020, basing their total on news reports of such deaths during the lockdown. The causes for these deaths have been reported as with reasons ranging from starvation, suicides, exhaustion, road and rail accidents, police brutality and denial of timely medical care. Among the reported deaths, most were among the marginalised migrants and labourers. 80 died while travelling back home on the Shramik Special trains, in the one month since their launch.

Notably, on 8 May, a freight train killed 16 migrants who had stopped to rest on railway tracks near Aurangabad in Maharashtra. On 14 May, eight migrant workers were killed and nearly 55 injured when the truck they were in collided with a bus near Guna, Madhya Pradesh. On 16 May 24 migrant workers were killed and many more were injured when a trailer carrying migrants (along with sacks of lime) rammed into a stationary truck, also carrying migrants, in Auraiya district of Uttar Pradesh. According to data collected by SaveLIFE Foundation, an NGO working in road safety, 198 migrant workers were killed in road accidents, as of 2 June.

== Reception ==
Thousands of migrants have since protested across the country, for reasons ranging from demanding transport back home, quality of food served, not being allowed to cross the border, and against government directives preventing them to walk home. Some of the protests turned violent.

Labour unions organised nationwide protests to protest the changes in labour laws, with the Bharatiya Mazdoor Sangh organizing one on 20 May and the Centre of Indian Trade Unions and the All India Trade Union Congress organizing another on 22 May. Seven left parties wrote to the President to intervene in the issue. Ten labour unions wrote to the International Labour Organization (ILO) regarding the labour laws, on 14 May. In response, the ILO expressed "deep concern" to PM Modi and requested him to instruct the central and state governments to uphold commitments (towards labour laws) made by India.

Negative comparisons have been made between the situation of many domestic migrants and Indians abroad: Shekhar Gupta criticized the media and Modi for focusing on the Vande Bharat Mission and thus the more affluent at the expense of the working class. Some politicians criticised the central government for not focusing enough on migrant workers. NITI Aayog CEO, Amitabh Kant, admitted that the migrant workers could have been better taken care of and stated that it was the responsibility of the state governments. Economist Jean Drèze stated that the lockdown had been "almost a death sentence" for the underprivileged of the country, further stating, "The policies are made or influenced by a class of people who pay little attention to the consequences for the underprivileged".

In May, Manoj Muntashir composed a poem on the plight of migrant workers. Later in June, Javed Akhtar also composed one on the same.

The Supreme Court of India praised the Uttar Pradesh government for the handling of this crisis.

== See also ==
- COVID-19 lockdown in India
- Economic impact of the COVID-19 pandemic in India
