= Garib Kalyan Rojgar Abhiyaan =

India Government initiative

- Country: India
- Launched: 20 June 2020
- Status: active
- Website: gkra.nic.in

The Government of India launched the Gareeb Kalyan Rojgar Abhiyaan (GKRA) initiative to tackle the impact of COVID-19 on shramik (migrant) workers in India.

== Details ==
It is a rural public works scheme which was launched on 20 June 2020 with an initial funding of ₹50,000 crore (equivalent to ₹590 billion or US$7.0 billion in 2023). GKRA aims to give 125 days of employment to 670,000 migrant workers, approximately two-thirds of the total migrant labourer force that has gone back to rural areas. The scheme covers 116 districts in six states, Bihar, Uttar Pradesh, Madhya Pradesh, Rajasthan, Odisha and Jharkhand. The scheme is a joint effort by 12 different Ministries(Department of rural development, Department of Drinking water and sanitation, Ministry of Road Transport and Highway, Ministry of Panchayati Raj, Department of Telecommunication, Department of New and Renewable Energy, Ministry of Railways, Minisiry of Mines, Department of Agricultural Research and Education, Ministry of Environment, Forest and Climate Change, Ministry of Petroleum, Ministry of Defence) /Departments and covers 25 categories of works/ activities. Under the scheme, a provision has been made to provide employment to migrant laborers who have left work from different states in the village itself. The laborers will be given work in the development schemes run by the Central and State Government in the village and they will also get work according to their interest and skills.

== Work and activities ==
Works and activities include:

1. Community Sanitary Complex
2. Gram Panchayat Bhawan
3. Works under Finance Commission funds
4. National Highway works
5. Water conservation & harvesting works
6. Construction of wells
7. Plantation (including through CAMPA Funds)
8. Horticulture
9. Anganwadi Centers
10. Rural Housing (PMAY–Gramin)
11. Rural connectivity (PMGSY) & Border road works
12. Railway works
13. Shyama Prasad Mukherjee RURBAN Mission
14. PM KUSUM works
15. Laying of Fiber Optic Cable under Bharat Net
16. Works under Jal Jeevan Mission
17. Works under PM Urja Ganga Project
18. Training through KVKs for Livelihoods
19. Works through District Mineral Fund
20. Solid and liquid waste management works
21. Farm ponds
22. Cattle sheds
23. Goat sheds
24. Poultry sheds
25. Vermicomposting
