= Base effect =

Observed mathematical effect

The base effect is a mathematical effect that originates from the fact that a given percentage of a reference value, is not the same as the absolute difference of the same given percentage of a much larger or smaller reference value. E.g. 1% of a GDP of US$1 million is not equal to 1% of GDP of US$1 billion in terms of absolute difference.

The reference value is common called a base year in economics.

A low base effect is the tendency of an absolute change from a low initial amount to be translated into a larger percentage change, while a high base effect would be the tendency of an absolute change from a high initial amount to be translated into a smaller percentage change.

Because of the base effect percentages in time series analysis can be misleading, in particular when percentages are compounded annually over a period of many years.

A high base effect can mislead because of decreasing percentages even while the underlying absolute difference is increasing over time as much as the measured value or population increases over time. Also, a low base effect can mislead because of increasing percentages even while the absolute difference is decreasing over time as much as the measured value or population decreases over time.

A base effect is closely related to a base year, which serves as a reference point to normalize rates of change, similar to the function of a denominator in comparisons.

When inflation is measured with a price index different formulas produce different results because of the base effect. E.g. Paasche versus Laspeyres price indices. Because of the problems, in particular with headline inflation, that arise from volatility in prices core inflation is used as an additional indicator of the development of inflation.

A lot of different methodologies can be used to correct for the base effect in computations of economic growth, and are often used in financial market analysis.

A base effect relates to inflation when in the corresponding period of the previous year. If the inflation rate was too low in the corresponding period of the previous year, even a smaller rise in the Price Index will arithmetically give a high rate of inflation now. On the other hand, if the price index had risen at a high rate in the corresponding period of the previous year and recorded high inflation rate, a similar absolute increase in the price index now will show a lower inflation rate now.

An example of the base effect:

The Price Index is 100, 150, and 200 in each of three consecutive periods, called 1, 2, and 3, respectively. The increase of 50 from period 1 to period 2 gives a percentage increase of 50%, but the increase from period 2 to period 3, despite being the same as the previous increase in absolute terms, gives a percentage increase of only 33.33%. This is due to the relatively large difference in the bases on which the percentages are calculated (100 vs 150).

== See also ==
- Compound annual growth rate
- Path dependence
- Volatility tax
- Low base effect
- Relative change
- Percentage#Percentage increase and decrease
- Time series analysis
