= Sonal Varma =

Indian economist

- Education: Delhi School of Economics (M.Ec. 2003); Lady Shri Ram College (B.Ec. 2001)

Sonal Varma is an Indian economist who is currently working as the Managing Director and Chief Economist (India and Asia ex-Japan) for Nomura Holdings. She is based in Nomura Holdings' Singapore sector as a member of the Asia ex-Japan Global Market Research team. Varma specializes in the analysis of trends in the Indian economy, and is considered to be one of India's top 3 economists. She is also considered the top female forecaster for quarterly gross domestic product (GDP) in India, and her forecasts are often published in media, such as her articles in The Economic Times, Bloomberg, and Business Standard. As an economist, she has worked with the Indian government in order to design India's industrial production index.

== Education ==
Sonal Varma attended Lady Shri Ram College, a division of the University of Delhi, in 1998 and graduated with a Bachelor of Economics in 2001. Later in 2001, she attended the Delhi School of Economics and graduated with a Masters of Economics in 2003.

== Career ==
In 2003, Varma worked at CRISIL for 2 years as an economist until 2005. Late in 2005, Varma worked at ICICI Bank as an economist, until 2007 when she started work at Lehman Brothers as the India economist. When Nomura Holdings took over the Asian division of Lehman Brothers in 2008, Varma became the Managing Director and India Chief Economist for Nomura Holdings. In mid-2019, Varma expanded her work as the India and Asia ex-Japan Chief Economist in Nomura Holdings.

== Awards ==
The Asset magazine ranked Varma as #1 for Research in India in 2012 to 2015.

Bloomberg named her as the #1 Forecaster for Indian Economic Data in 2012 and 2013.

She was picked by the All-India Institutional Investor survey as one of the Top 3 economists in India for 2013, 2014, and 2015.

== Notable works ==
In October 2007, Sonal Varma was a part-author of a report called India: Everything to Play for, in which they predicted different reforms that would allow India to grow economically. This report was written with Lehman Brothers, when Varma was still part of the company.

In February 2010, Varma was a contributing author for a report called The Ascent of Asia, in which different policies were predicted to increase Asia's gross domestic product. This report was written for Nomura Holdings.

In October 2012, Varma was part-author of a report for Nomura Holdings called Introducing NESII - The Nomura Economic Surprise Index for India. This report describes a new indicator for calculating any surprises and momentum in India's economic data.
