= Centre for Sustainable Agriculture =

Indian research institute

Centre for Sustainable Agriculture (CSA)
- Type: Independent Research Organisation
- Headquarters: Hyderabad, Andhra Pradesh, India
- Area served: Rural Areas of Andhra Pradesh, Punjab, Chatthisgarh

Centre for Sustainable Agriculture (CSA) was registered as a Trust in Hyderabad in the year 2004. It is an Independent Research Organization, partnering with NGOs and Community-based organizations to establish Sustainable Agriculture models.

CSA has implemented Non-Pesticidal Management (NPM) in 45 villages in Andhra Pradesh.

== Organizational structure ==
Board of Trustees: This Board consists of agriculture scientists like Dr M. S. Chari, Retd. Director of Central Tobacco Research Institute; Shri Devinder Sharma, agriculture trade policy analyst; Dr Ranga Rao, Scientist with ICRISAT; Dr Ramadevi Kolli, ICRISAT; Ms Kamla Bhasin, women's rights activist and formerly with the FAO; Ms Anuradha Prasad, HRD specialist. Shri Subash Sharma, Organic farmers from Yavatmal, Maharashtra. There is an Executive Council consisting of representatives of both staff and board members. This Council meets more frequently than the Board. The team is led by the executive director, Dr G. V. Ramanjaneyulu who is an agricultural scientist and was with the Indian Council of Agricultural Research (ICAR) earlier. There is core team consist of ED along with Dr. Raja shekar (Ph.D. in Agriculture Extension and LLB), Dr. G.Chandra Sekhar (Agriculture Extension). There are Project Managers and Project Officers, where work responsibilities are shared project-wise (specializations included such as seeds, pest management, disease management etc.) as well as for particular geographical areas. The organization also has support staff in the form of an Accounts & Administration Officer and Office Assistants.
