= Low base effect =

Concept in business and economics

Low base effect in business and economics is the tendency of a small absolute change from a low initial amount to be translated into a large percentage change.

In the following example, focusing solely on the 33.3% growth of Company B in year 5 may give a misleading indication of the company's relative performance versus Company A.

	Initial	Year 1	Year 2	Year 3	Year 4	Year 5
Company A Value	100	120	140	160	180	200
Change	–	20	20	20	20	20
%Growth	–	20	16.7	14.3	12.5	11.1
Company B Value	100	90	80	70	60	80
Change	–	-10	-10	-10	-10	20
%Growth	–	-10	-11.1	-12.5	-14.3	33.3

== See also ==
- Base effect
