= Ways and means advances =

Reserve Bank of India credit facility

Ways and means advances (WMA) is a mechanism used by Reserve Bank of India (RBI) under its credit policy to provide to States, banking with it, to help them tide over temporary mismatches in the cash flow of their receipts and payments. This is guided under Section 17(5) of RBI Act, 1934, and are '..repayable in each case not later than three months from the date of making that advance'.

There are two types of WMA – normal and special. While Normal WMA are clean advances, Special WMA are secured advances provided against the pledge of government of India–dated securities. The operative limit for special WMA for a state is subject to its holdings of central government dated securities up to a maximum of limit sanctioned. In addition, the RBI has determined limits for normal and special WMA for each state as multiples of the prescribed minimum balance required to be maintained with the RBI by that state. These limits have been revised periodically.

These are temporary advances (overdrafts) extended by RBI to the govt. Section 17(5) of RBI Act allows RBI to make WMA both to the Central and State Govt. Objective – to bridge the interval between expenditure and receipts. They are not a sources of finance but are meant to provide support, for purely temporary difficulties that arise on account of mismatch/shortfall in revenue or other receipts for meeting the government liabilities. They have to be periodically adjusted to enable use of such financing for future mismatches. On 26 March 1997, Govt. of India and RBI signed an agreement putting the ad hoc T-bills system to end w.e.f 1 April 1997.

== Interest rate ==
The interest rate on WMA is at or around bank rate (with small adjustment for different kinds of WMA for State Govt.) and overdrawing if any carries 2% higher interest. Duration 10 consecutive working days for Central Govt. and 21 days for State Govt. Amount ceiling Limits on WMA are fixed at the beginning of a fiscal year by RBI. For 2018–19, Central Govt. limit is Rs.35000 cr for Oct-Feb and Rs.25000 cr for Mar.

== Minimum balances ==
The minimum balance required to be maintained by Govt. on Fridays and at the close of the Govt.’s or RBI's financial year shouldn't be less than Rs.100 cr and on any other working day not less than Rs.10 cr. Further when 75% of WMA is utilised, the RBI may consider fresh flotation of market loans depending on the market conditions.
