= 2nd Infinity Forum =

2023 fintech summit in GIFT City, India

2nd Infinity Forum InFinity Forum 2.0 Fintech Summit at GIFT City
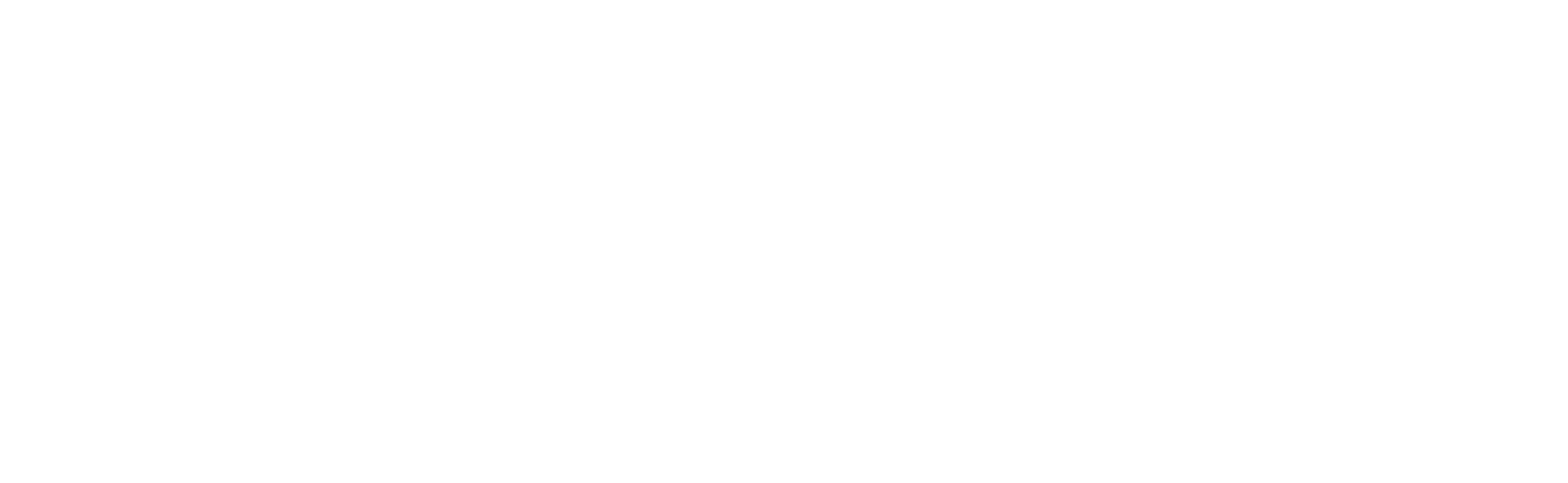
- Host country: India
- Dates: 9 December 2023
- Motto: GIFT-IFSC: Nerve Centre for New Age Global Financial Services
- Venues: GIFT City
- Participants: Narendra Modi (Prime Minister of India); Bhupendra Patel (Chief Minister of Gujarat); Piyush Goyal (Minister of State); Ashwini Vaishnaw (Minister of State); Uday Kotak (Kotak Mahindra Bank); Vijay Shekhar Sharma (Paytm); Nikhil Kamath
- President: K Rajaraman (Chairperson, IFSCA)
- Follows: 1st Infinity Forum
- Website: www.infinityforum.in

InFinity Forum 2.0 also called 2nd InFinity Forum, is the second edition of the International Financial Services Centres Authority (IFSCA)'s financial technology (FinTech) summit. It was held on December 9, 2023, in Gujarat International Finance Tec-City (GIFT City), Gujarat, India.

Prime Minister Narendra Modi emphasized India's remarkable 7.7% GDP growth in the first half of the current fiscal year while speaking via video link to the "Infinity Forum 2.0" conference. (Note: in virtual keynote) According to the PMO statement, the event is expected to attract over 300 Chief Experience Officers (CXOs), indicating a high level of online interaction from the Indian audience as well as a worldwide audience that spans more than 20 nations. Representatives from the United States, United Kingdom, Singapore, South Africa, United Arab Emirates, Australia, and Germany are among the notable participants. He said that India wants to position Gujarat as a global center for sustainable finance and its financial hub to assist finance the USD 10 trillion needed to reach its net zero emissions objective by 2070. According to him, India hopes to elevate GIFT City's status to that of a cutting-edge hub for financial services and technology. Modi said "GIFT IFSC is a highly effective means of achieving both the necessary flow of green finance and a low-carbon economy in India. The world will benefit from the issuance of financial instruments like green bonds, sustainable bonds, and sustainability-linked bonds.

== Background ==
The Infinity Forum is an annual event organized by the International Financial Services Centres Authority (IFSCA) to promote dialogue and collaboration within the global FinTech ecosystem. The second edition, "InFinity Forum 2.0: GIFT-IFSC: Nerve Centre for New Age Global Financial Services," occurred in GIFT City, India. This event served as a precursor to the 2024 Vibrant Gujarat Global Summit. The virtual keynote address will be given by India's Prime Minister, Narendra Modi. Other notable speakers at the event include Nirmala Srinivasan, India's Finance Minister; Gujarat Chief Minister, Bhupendra Patel; and Ashwini Vaishnav, India's Minister for Railways, Communications, Electronics, and Information Technology, among others. The event was attended by the presence of Prime Minister Narendra Modi, who delivered a keynote address highlighting the government's commitment to fostering innovation and growth in the FinTech sector. He emphasized the significance of GIFT-IFSC as a catalyst for driving financial inclusion and technological advancements in India.

== See also ==
- IFSCA
