= International Financial Services Centre =

International Financial Services Centre may refer to any of the following places:

- International Financial Services Centre, Dublin
- GIFT International Financial Services Centre
- Dubai International Financial Centre
- Astana International Financial Centre
- Dubai Financial Services Authority
- International Financial Services Centres Authority
