= India International Exchange =

Indian international stock exchange in GIFT City

India International Exchange IFSC Limited
- Type: Stock Exchange
- Location: GIFT City, Gujarat, India
- Founded: 2017
- Owner: Ministry of Finance, Government of India.
- Key people: Mayank Jain (Company Manager)
- Currency: Indian rupee (₹)
- Website: www.indiainx.com

India International Exchange IFSC Limited, also known as the India International Exchange (India INX), is India's first international stock exchange. It was launched as a subsidiary of the Bombay Stock Exchange (BSE). It is located at the International Financial Services Centre, GIFT City.

It was inaugurated by the Prime Minister of India, Narendra Modi, on 9 January 2017. The trading operations began on 16 January 2017. It operates on EUREX T7, an advanced technology platform. India INX claims that it is the world's fastest exchange, with a turn-around time of 4 microseconds. It operates 22 hours a day, six days a week. These timings facilitate international investors and Non-Resident Indians to trade from anywhere across the globe at their preferred time.

== History ==
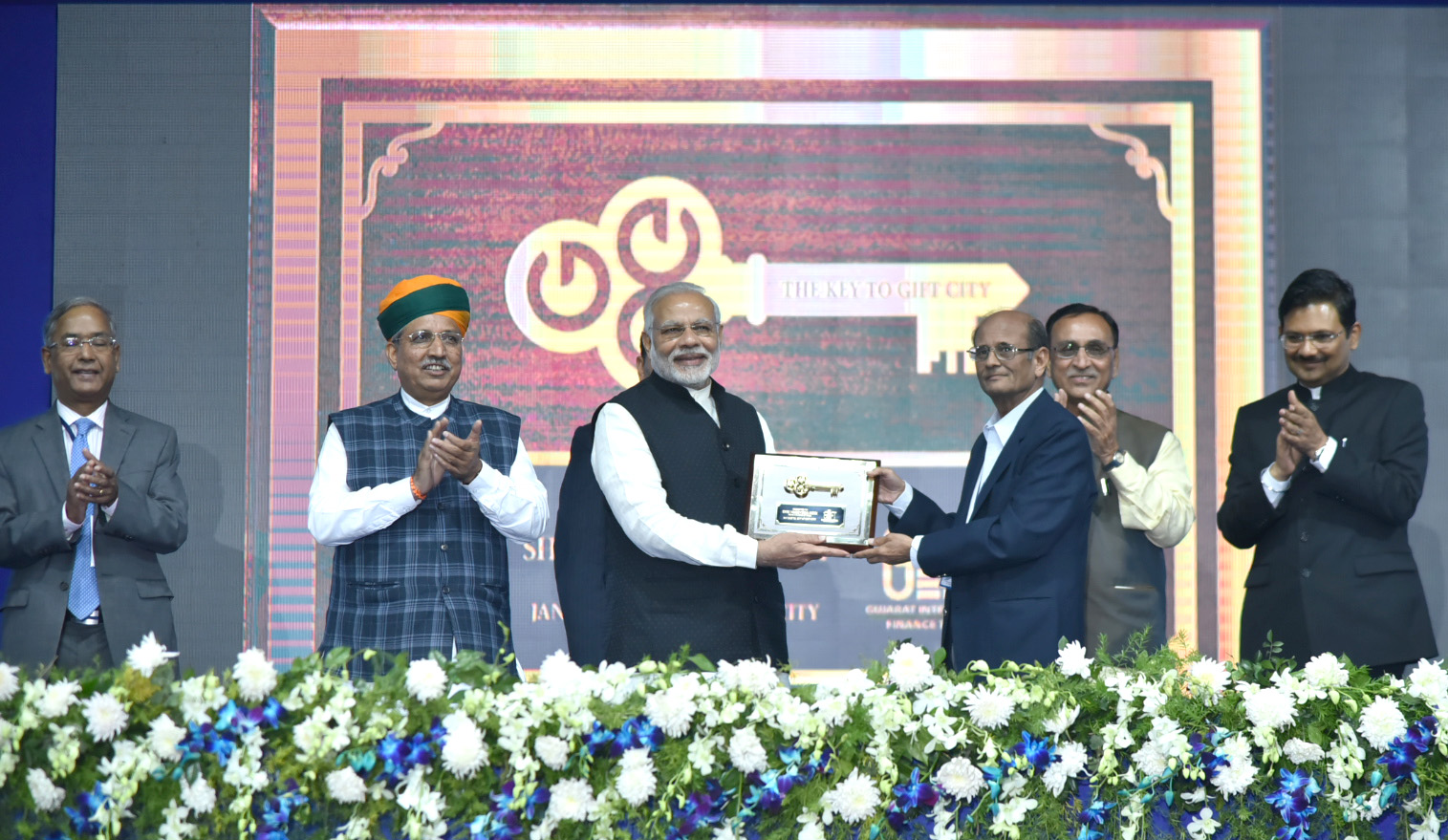
Prime Minister Narendra Modi in 2017 at the India International Exchange inauguration ceremony in GIFT City.

India International Exchange (India INX) is India's international stock exchange based in IFSC, GIFT City. It was launched by the BSE in January 2017 with the aim of providing a world-class trading platform for international investors.

India INX offers trading in various asset classes, including equities, currencies, and commodities. It operates for 22 hours a day, allowing investors from different time zones to trade at their convenience. The exchange is regulated by the Securities and Exchange Board of India (SEBI) and offers several tax benefits to investors.

=== Chronology ===
Timeline
- January 9, 2017: India INX launched its trading operations at the IFSC in GIFT City. The exchange started trading in equity derivatives with single stock futures and options contracts based on 175 underlying securities.
- January 2018: India INX achieved a cumulative trading volume of over $10 billion in its first year of operations. The exchange also introduced trading in index futures and options contracts on the S&P BSE Sensex and S&P BSE Bankex indices.
- March 2018: India INX launched trading in gold kilo futures contract, the first commodity derivative product on the exchange. This contract is based on 1 kg of gold and is settled in cash in Indian rupees.
- December 2018: India INX signed a Memorandum of Understanding (MoU) with Moscow Exchange (MOEX) to connect trading systems and offer a wider range of products to investors. The MoU also includes cooperation in areas such as market data distribution, product development, and other areas of mutual interest.
- January 2019: India INX achieved a cumulative trading volume of over $20 billion in its second year of operations. The exchange also launched trading in silver kilo futures contract, expanding its offering in the commodity derivatives segment.
- October 2019: India INX signed an MoU with Dubai Gold and Commodities Exchange (DGCX) to develop and launch trading products in the Indian and Middle Eastern markets. The partnership aims to create new opportunities for investors by leveraging the strengths of both exchanges in terms of product development, market access, and technology.
- January 2020: India INX achieved a cumulative trading volume of over $50 billion in its third year of operations. The exchange also launched trading in crude oil futures contract, the first contract in the energy derivatives segment.
- January 2021: India INX achieved a cumulative trading volume of over $100 billion in its fourth year of operations. The exchange also signed an MoU with London Stock Exchange Group (LSEG) to explore cooperation in areas such as product development, market access, and sharing of market data.
- March 2021: India INX launched trading in copper futures contract, expanding its offering in the commodity derivatives segment. The contract is based on 1 tonne of copper and is settled in cash in Indian rupees.
- Jan 2023: India INX signs MoU with Kling Block Chain IFSC.

== Operations ==
In early 2020, the Asian Development Bank raised $118 million from offshore rupee-linked 10-year bonds. The bonds were listed on India INX. India INX offers access to the full range of stocks and exchange-traded funds available in US markets. The daily average volume in foreign stocks in India INX during the month of January 2022 was $5,242. By May it had risen to $42,954 and to $195,139 in June 2022. During the last week of June, the daily average volume was $462,036.

== Indices ==
India INX offers a wide range of products, including equity derivatives, currency derivatives, and commodity derivatives.

Some of the key indices that are traded on India INX are:

1. India INX 50: It is a benchmark index designed to measure the performance of the top 50 stocks listed on India INX. The index is based on free-float market capitalization and includes companies from various sectors.
2. India INX Quality 30: This index consists of the 30 top-performing companies based on quality parameters such as return on equity, earnings growth, and leverage.
3. India INX Midcap: It tracks the performance of the mid-cap segment of the Indian equity market.
4. India INX Bankex: This index includes the most liquid and large Indian banking stocks listed on India INX.
5. India INX Gold: This index tracks the performance of the gold spot price in USD per troy ounce.
6. India INX Infrastructure Index: This index includes companies that are engaged in infrastructure-related activities such as construction, engineering, and real estate development.
7. India INX Consumer Durables Index: This index tracks the performance of the consumer durables sector in India, which includes companies that produce household appliances, electronics, and other durable goods.
8. India INX IT Index: This index includes companies in the information technology sector, which is a major contributor to the Indian economy.
9. India INX Energy Index: This index tracks the performance of the energy sector in India, which includes companies involved in oil and gas exploration, refining, and distribution.
10. India INX Pharma Index: This index includes companies in the pharmaceutical sector, which is a major contributor to the Indian economy and has a significant global presence.
11. India INX Small Cap Index: This index tracks the performance of the small-cap segment of the Indian equity market.

== Listing requirements ==
India International Exchange (India INX) follows the listing requirements set by the Securities and Exchange Board of India (SEBI), which are as follows:

1. Minimum net worth: The issuer company should have a minimum net worth of ₹100 crores (approximately USD 13 million).
2. Profit track record: The issuer company should have a profit track record of at least three years preceding the date of application.
3. Minimum issue size: The minimum issue size should be ₹100 crores (approx USD 13 million).
4. Shareholding pattern: The shareholding pattern should comply with SEBI regulations, and the promoter's minimum contribution should be 20% of the post-issue paid-up capital.
5. Corporate governance: The issuer company should have a sound corporate governance structure and comply with SEBI regulations in this regard.
6. Financial disclosure: The issuer company should disclose all relevant financial information, including audited financial statements and other relevant documents.
7. Listing agreement: The issuer company should sign a listing agreement with India INX and comply with all the obligations under the agreement.
8. Other regulatory requirements: The issuer company should comply with all other regulatory requirements set by SEBI and other relevant authorities.

== See also ==
- India International Bullion Exchange
- Bombay Stock Exchange
- National Stock Exchange of India
- List of major stock exchanges
