= IFSC =

IFSC may refer to:

- Indian Financial System Code
- International Financial Services Centre (disambiguation), several financial areas
- Federal Institute of Santa Catarina (Instituto Federal de Santa Catarina), an educational institution in southern Brazil
- World Climbing, formerly known as the International Federation of Sport Climbing
