= Gujarat IT/ITeS policy 2022–2027 =

Information technology policy of Gujarat

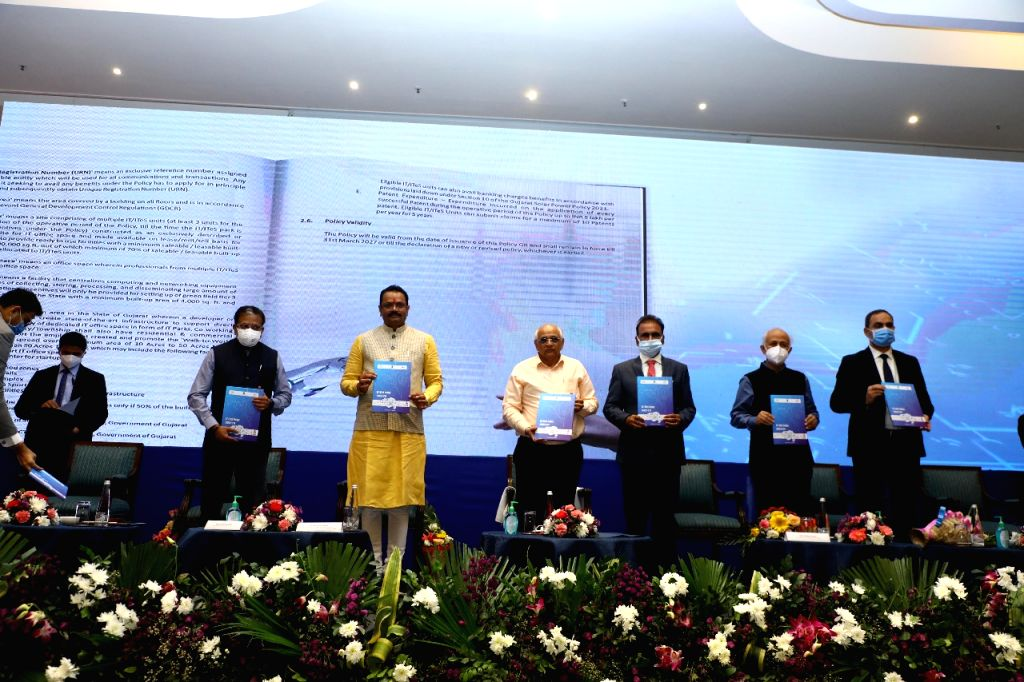
- Gujarat Chief Minister Bhupendra Patel unveiled a new IT/ITES policy at GIFT City, Gandhinagar
- Location: Gandhinagar
- State: Gujarat
- Chief Minister: Bhupendra Patel
- Ministry: Science and Technology
- Key people: Jitu Vaghani, Vijay Nehra
- Launched: 8 February 2022; 3 years ago GIFT City, Gandhinagar
- Website: dstpolicy.gujarat.gov.in

The new Gujarat IT/ITeS policy was unveiled on 8 February 2022 at GIFT City, Gandhinagar by Chief Minister Bhupendra Patel. The objective of the policy is to strengthen the Information technology ecosystem of Gujarat and to generate 1 lakh direct jobs in the IT/ITeS sector. The goal is to improve IT export from 3,000 to 25,000 crore.

== Key Pointers ==
- Facilitate the creation of world class co-working spaces to enable any IT company to fast track their IT operations in the State.
- Establishment of the Gujarat AI School / AI Center of Excellence with the objective to become the foremost source of Industry ready skilled talent for the IT Industry.

=== CAPEX ===
- The policy envisions CAPEX support of 25% up to ₹50 Cr. for normal projects and INR 200 Cr. for Mega Projects.
- CAPEX support for Data Center of 25% up to INR 150 Cr. and Power tariff subsidy of INR 1/unit for a period of 5 years.
- CAPEX support for Cable Landing Station (CLS) of 25% up to INR 20 Cr. and Power tariff subsidy of INR 1/unit for a period of 5 years.

=== OPEX ===
- Under the OPEX model, the government will provide support of 15% up to INR 20 Cr. per year for normal projects and INR 40 Cr. per year for Mega Projects

=== Employment ===
- Special initiatives to boost IT employment in the state through Employment Generation Incentive and up to 100% reimbursement of employer's EPF contribution
- Financial support up to INR 50,000 per person through Direct Benefit Transfer (DBT) to the graduate students and working professionals for skill development
- Large-scale Information, Education and Communication (IEC) programs targeting school children and general public for improving digital literacy and enhancing awareness of Information Technology.

=== IT Cities / Townships ===
- Incentivizing the development of IT Cities / Townships with CAPEX support up to INR 100 Cr. and relaxations in regulatory & FCI norms.
