= Paytm Money =

Indian online stock broker platform

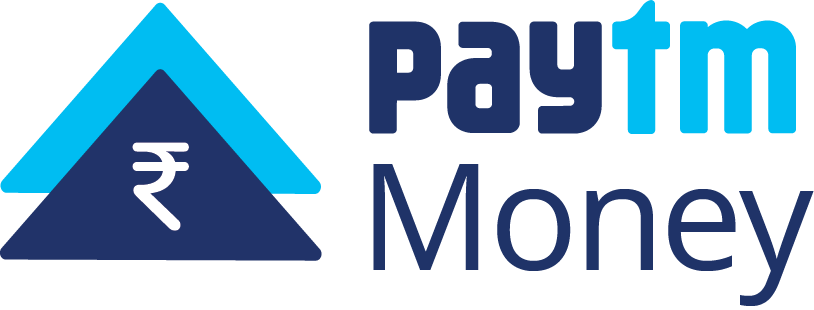
- Type: Subsidiary
- Industry: Financial services
- Founded: 2017
- Headquarters: Delhi, India
- Key people: Sandeep Bhardwaj (MD & CEO)
- Parent: One97 Communications Limited
- Website: www.paytmmoney.com

Paytm Money is an Indian wealth-technology (wealth-tech) platform and stock broker. It is division of One97 Communications, the parent company of Paytm. Headquartered in Delhi, it offers retail investors access to equities, derivatives, mutual funds, exchange-traded funds (ETFs), initial public offerings (IPOs), fixed income instruments, and retirement products.

== History ==
Paytm Money was incorporated in 2017 as a wholly owned subsidiary of One97 Communications. It launched in 2018 with direct mutual fund investments via a commission-free platform.

Between 2019 and 2021, the platform expanded to include stock broking, retirement products, and futures & options trading. It also introduced features like IPO applications, AI-powered voice trading, and stock SIPs.

In 2023, the company introduced a bonds investment platform and reported profitability for FY 2022–23, citing brokerage income growth.

In 2024–25, Paytm Money launched margin trading facilities, expanded derivatives to BSE, and introduced trader-focused tools such as options scalpers, max-pain charts, and advanced chart-based order placement.

== Recognition ==
Paytm Money has received awards such as Celent’s "Model Wealth Manager Award" and IFTA WealthTech recognition. Paytm Money launches India’s first AI-driven equity fund.
