= Asian Digital Finance Forum & Awards =

Annual digital finance forum and honorary awards platform

- Awarded for: Contributions to digital finance, financial inclusion, and (from 2025) ethical AI governance in finance
- Venue: Hilton Colombo / Port City Colombo
- Country: Sri Lanka
- Presented by: Asian FinTech Academy (AFTA), in collaboration with local and international institutions
- First award: 2022
- Website: www.asiandigitalfinanceforum.com

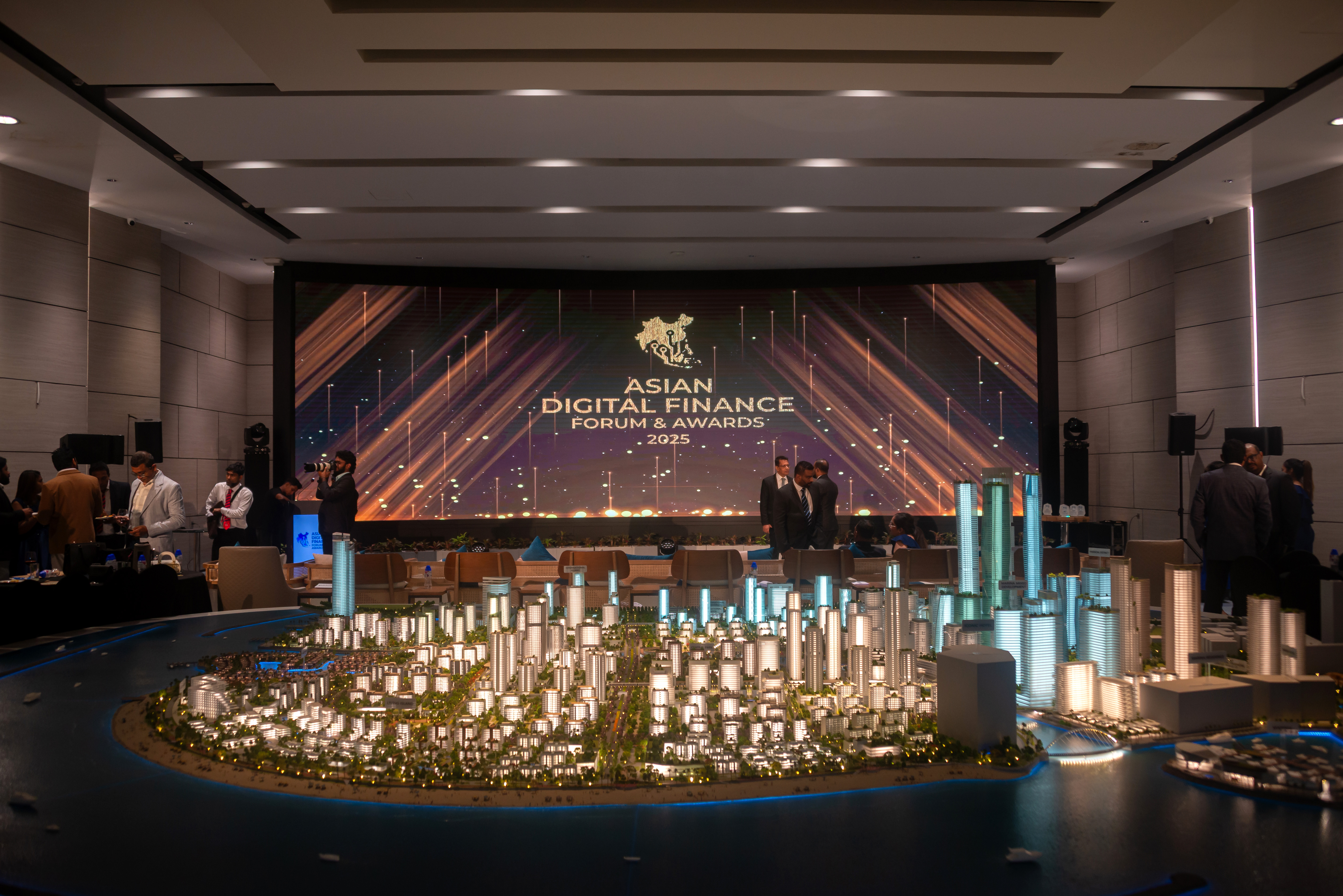
Asian Digital Finance Forum & Awards 2025 at Port City Colombo, with the Colombo International Financial Centre masterplan model in the foreground.

Asian Digital Finance Forum & Awards (also known as Asian Digital Finance Forum and Awards) is a forum and honorary awards platform convened in Colombo, Sri Lanka. It has been hosted in a hybrid format (virtual and in-person), with editions reported in 2022, 2023 and 2025. The event is organised by the Asian FinTech Academy (AFTA) in collaboration with a number of local and international institutions.

== Overview ==
The forum has featured international academic, industry, and policy speakers and has recognised institutions and individuals for contributions related to digital finance and fintech innovation. Media coverage has described participation and recognition at the forum as spanning multiple regions, with institutions and individuals from South Asia, Southeast Asia, East Asia, the Middle East, Europe, and North America featured across different editions.

== Awards and recognition ==
The forum and awards were held in a hybrid format with virtual and in-person proceedings at Hilton Colombo in the 2022 and 2023 editions.

The Asian Digital Finance Forum & Awards presents honorary recognitions to institutions and individuals for contributions to digital finance, financial inclusion, and related regulatory, technological, and policy developments. Media coverage has described the recognitions as non-competitive and based on demonstrated leadership and impact rather than open nominations.

In 2025, the forum and awards served as an anchor initiative associated with the Asia International Digital Economy & AI in Finance Summit at Port City Colombo, with an emphasis on artificial intelligence in finance, financial inclusion, and governance-related themes.

=== 2022 ===
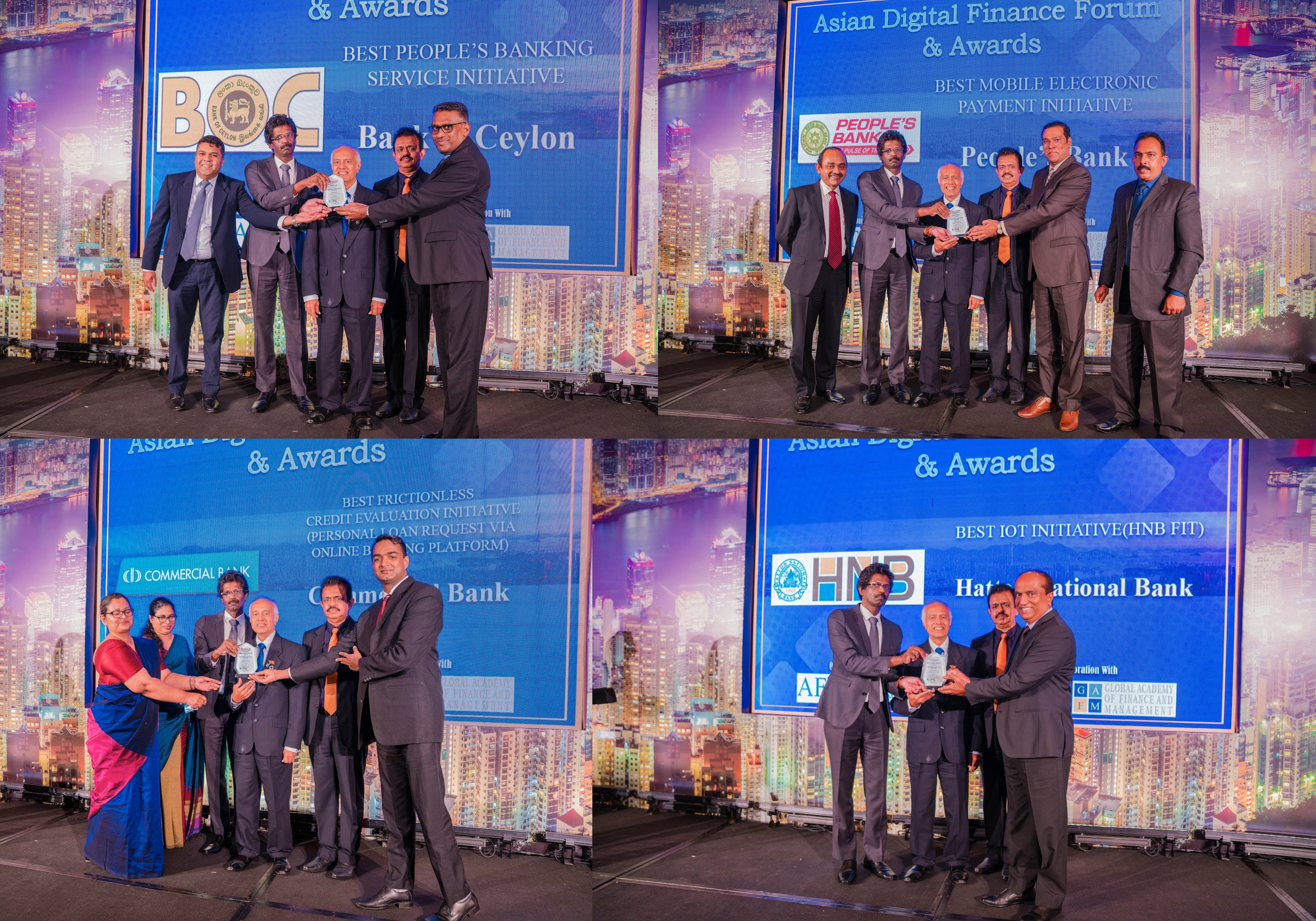
Award presentations to Bank of Ceylon, People’s Bank, Commercial Bank of Ceylon, and Hatton National Bank at the 2022 edition.

According to reporting by Daily FT, institutions recognised at the 2022 edition included Sri Lanka’s Bank of Ceylon, Commercial Bank of Ceylon, Hatton National Bank, and People’s Bank, alongside international organisations and fintech-sector contributors.

=== 2023 ===
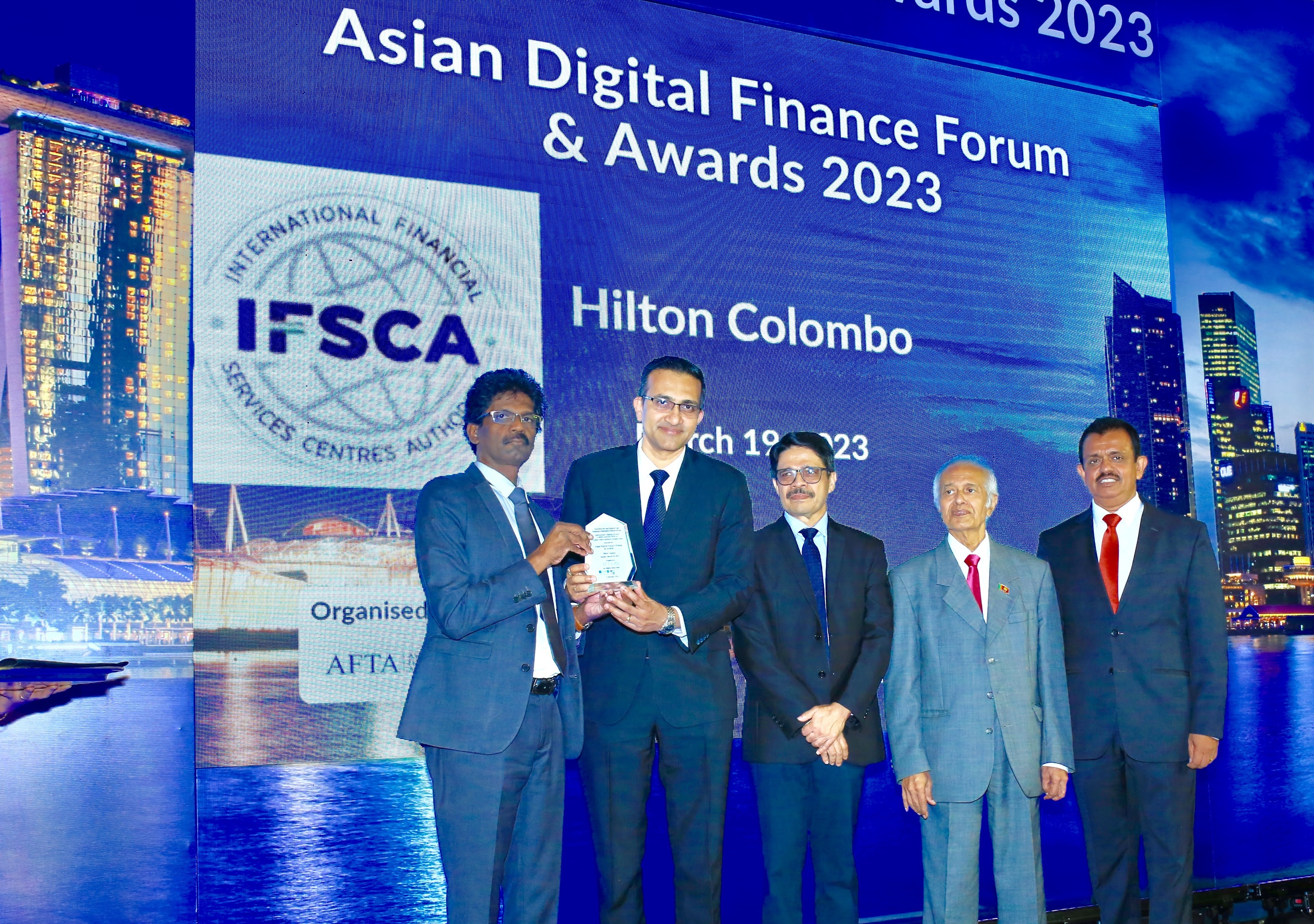
Award presentations to India’s International Financial Services Centres Authority (IFSCA) at the 2023 edition.

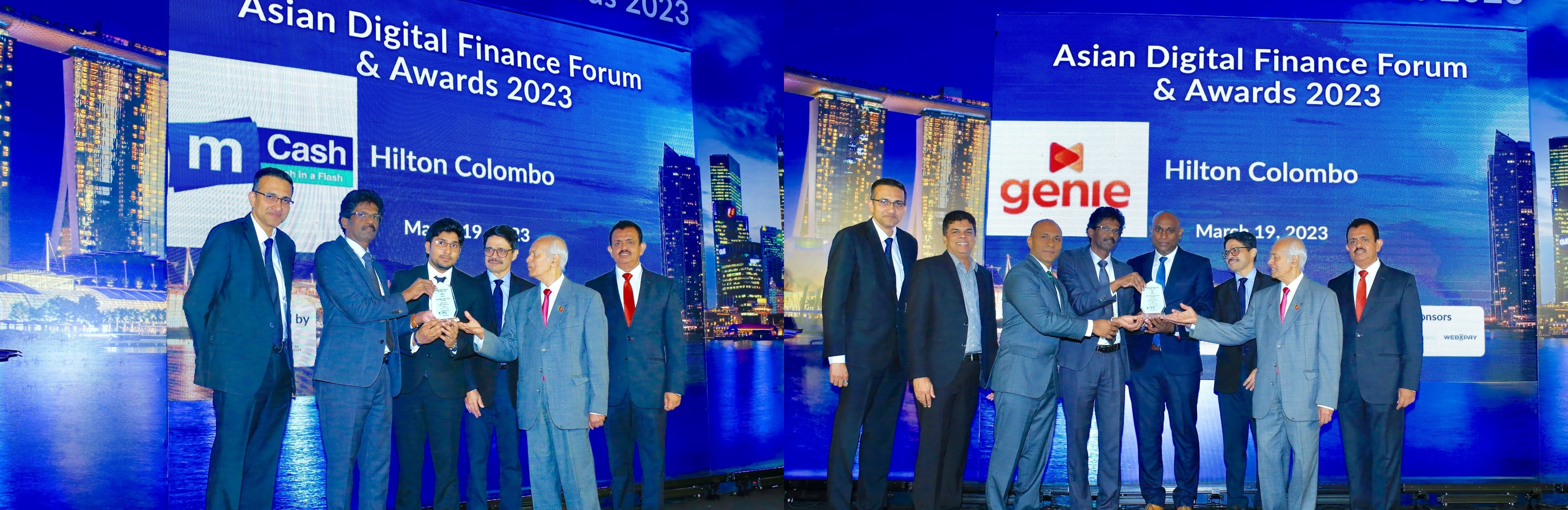
Award presentations to Dialog Genie and SLT-Mobitel mCash at the 2023 edition.

Coverage of the 2023 forum described recognitions awarded to India’s International Financial Services Centres Authority (IFSCA) for regulatory innovation, as well as to digital finance and payments platforms including Dialog Genie and SLT-Mobitel mCash. IDEMIA’s Asia–Pacific operations were also recognised for contributions related to biometric and digital identity technologies in financial services.

=== 2025 ===
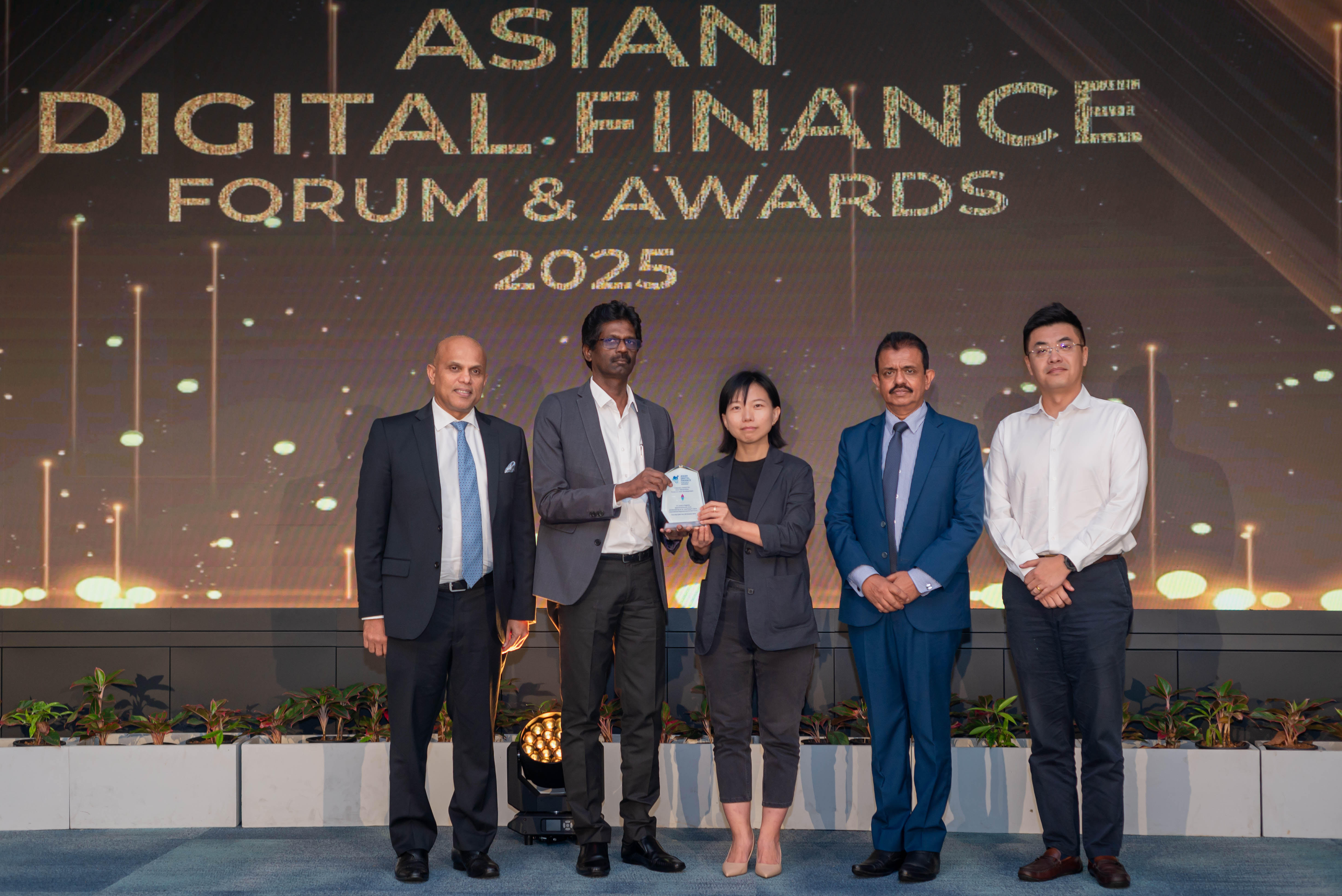
Award presentations to Sri Lanka's Port City Colombo at the 2025 edition.

For the 2025 edition, institutional honourees reported in the media included Nium (Singapore), recognised for cross-border payments optimisation, and Paytm (India), recognised for AI-powered financial inclusion initiatives. A Visionary Award for Next-Generation Financial Hub Development was presented to Port City Colombo in recognition of its fintech- and AI-oriented development strategy.

Individual honourees reported for 2025 included Sopnendu Mohanty (Singapore), Neil Tan (Hong Kong), Purvi Munot (United Arab Emirates), and Amira Abdelaziz (Egypt), recognised for contributions spanning fintech governance, ecosystem development, inclusive wealth technology, and AI-driven financial policy and regulation.

In 2025, media reports described the awards as being subject to an independent validation framework. The process was led by Dr. Sivaguru S. Sritharan, appointed as Global Validation Chair, and involved independent research, analytical review, and benchmarking against international standards, with recognitions characterised as honorary and non-competitive.

== See also ==
- Financial technology
