= India International Bullion Exchange =

Indian international bullion exchange in GIFT City

India International Bullion Exchange IFSC Limited
- Type: Bullion
- Location: GIFT City, Gujarat, India
- Founded: 2022
- Owner: Ministry of Finance, Government of India.
- Key people: Mr. Ashok Kumar Gautam (Chief Executive Officer and Managing Director)
- Currency: Indian rupee (₹)
- Website: www.iibx.co.in

India International Bullion Exchange IFSC Limited, also known as the India International Bullion Exchange (IIBX), is India's first bullion exchange. It was launched on 29 July, 2022 in GIFT City, Gujarat. IIBX is located in the GIFT International Financial Services Centre (GIFT IFSC). It is the third exchange of its kind in the world.
