= Bhupendrabhai Patel ministry =

Bhupendrabhai Patel ministry could refer to these cabinets headed by Indian politician Bhupendrabhai Patel as the Chief minister of Gujarat:

- First Bhupendrabhai Patel ministry (2021–2022)
- Second Bhupendrabhai Patel ministry (2022–)
