= Sivaguru S. Sritharan =

American aerodynamicist and mathematician

Professor Sivaguru S. Sritharan
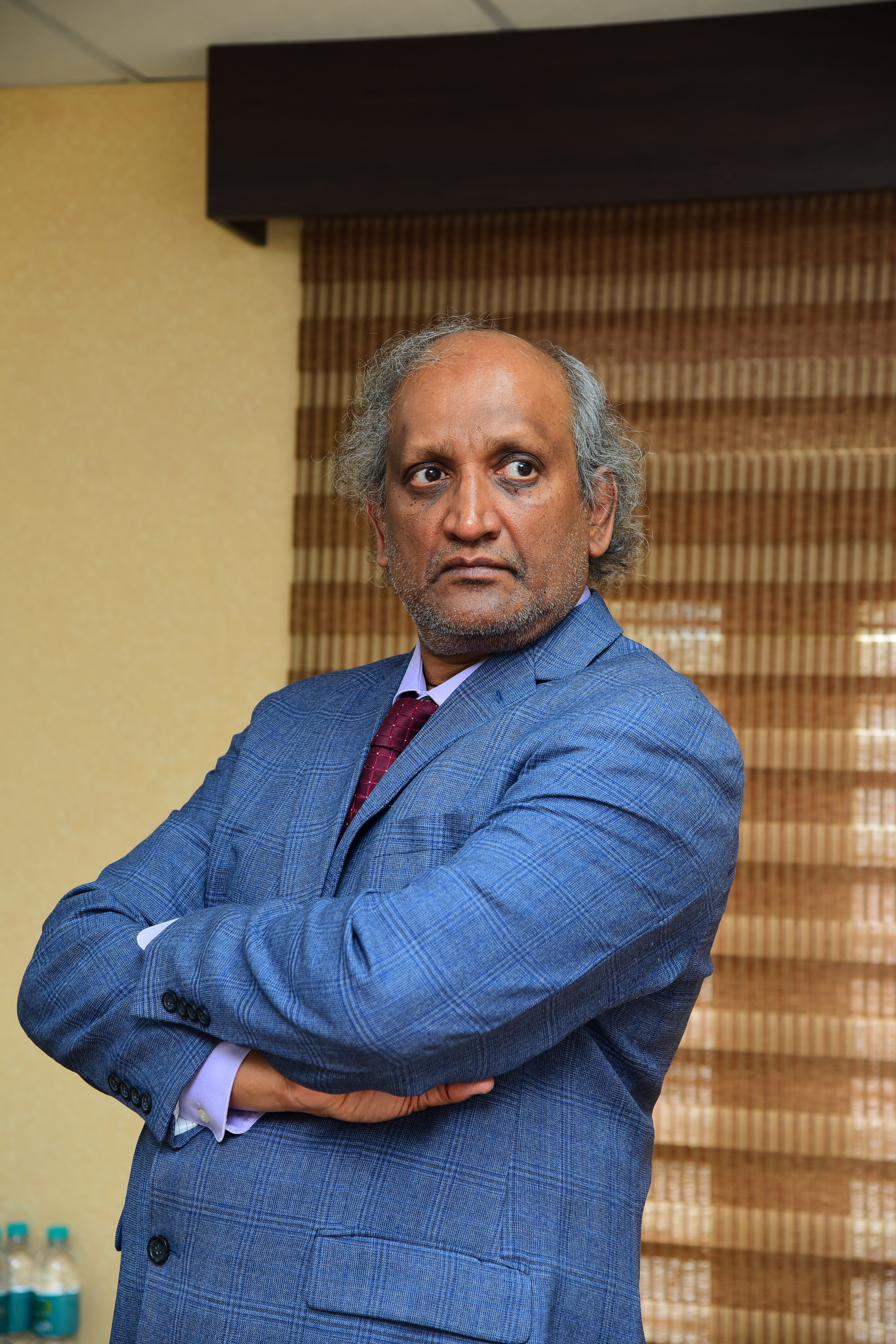
- Dr. Sivaguru S. Sritharan

Sivaguru S. Sritharan (also known as S. S. Sritharan) is an American aerodynamicist and mathematician.

Sritharan served in civilian universities such as University of Southern California and University of Wyoming as faculty member and head of the department and also in the Department of Defense (U. S. Navy and U. S. Air Force) in various capacities ranging from scientist to leadership roles, and also held visiting positions at several international institutions.

He served as the vice chancellor at the Ramaiah University of Applied Sciences in Bengaluru, India.

== Education ==
Sritharan had his high schooling at Jaffna Central College. He then joined at University of Sri Lanka (Peradeniya) and obtained a BSc (Honors) degree in mechanical engineering. He obtained a Master of Science degree in aeronautics and astronautics from University of Washington and a master's degree and Ph.D. in applied mathematics from University of Arizona.

== Career ==
Sritharan served as the first provost and vice chancellor of the Air Force Institute of Technology at Dayton, Ohio and as the dean of the Graduate School of Engineering and Applied Sciences at the Naval Postgraduate School, Monterey, California.

He was a professor and head of the Department of Mathematics at University of Wyoming and head of the Science and Technology Branch at the Naval Information Warfare Systems Command in San Diego.

== Public engagements ==
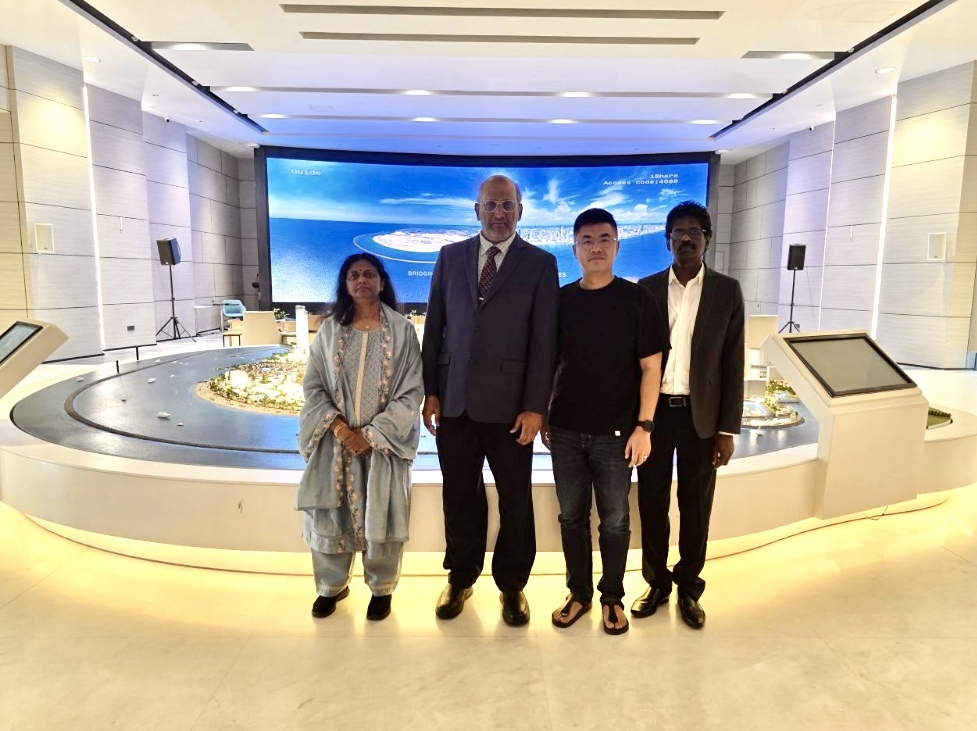
Sritharan, during a meeting with the leadership team of Port City Colombo at the site of the future Colombo International Financial Centre (CIFC) in June 2026.

In 2025, Sritharan served as Global Validation Chair of the Asian Digital Finance Forum & Awards, held at Port City Colombo as part of the Asia International Digital Economy & AI in Finance Summit. In this capacity, he oversaw the independent validation process for recognising contributions to artificial intelligence–driven financial innovation across Asia.

He also delivered a keynote address at the forum examining the evolution of algorithmic finance and its convergence with advanced mathematics and artificial intelligence.

== Contributions ==
Sritharan is known for his research contributions in rigorous mathematical theory, optimal control and stochastic analysis of fluid mechanics and magneto-hydrodynamics.

His notable contributions include:

1. Developing dynamic programming method for the equations of fluid dynamics. This subject is closely related to reinforcement learning in the language of machine learning.

2. First complete proof of the Pontryagin’s Maximum Principle for fluid dynamic equations with state constraints, as a joint work with UCLA mathematician Hector. O. Fattorini.

3. Developing robust (H-infinity) control theory for fluid dynamics as a joint work with Romanian mathematician Viorel P. Barbu.

4. First successful rigorous theory establishing a direct stochastic analogy to the famous Jacques-Louis Lions and G. Prodi (1959) on existence and uniqueness theorem for the two dimensional Navier-Stokes equation as a joint work with J. L. Menaldi utilizing a subtle local monotonicity property.

5. Proving Large Deviation Principle for stochastic Navier-Stokes equation as a joint work with P. Sundar to estimate the probability of rare events.

6. Systematic development of differential geometric methods for aerodynamics of supersonic delta wings.

7. Advancing geometric theory of hydrodynamic transition to turbulence.

8. Developing nonlinear filtering theory for stochastic Navier-Stokes equations for the estimation of turbulence based on partial measurements and similar theories for models describing quantum dynamics.

== Bibliography ==
- Sritharan, S.S. (2019), Invariant Manifold Theory for Hydrodynamic Transition, Courier Dover Publications, ISBN 9780486828282
- Sritharan, S.S. (1998), Optimal Control of Viscous Flow, SIAM, ISBN 9780898714067
