= Hiver (company) =

Software firm

- Type: Private
- Industry: Software-as-a-service
- Predecessor: GrexIt
- Founded: 2011
- Founder: Niraj Ranjan Rout; Nitesh Nandy
- Headquarters: San Jose, California
- Key people: Niraj Ranjan Rout (Co-founder & CEO); Nitesh Nandy (Co-founder & CTO); Meena Kumari R (Chief People Officer)
- Products: Hiver (customer service platform)
- Website: www.hiverhq.com

Hiver (formerly GrexIt) is a software company founded in 2011 by Nitesh Nandy and Niraj Ranjan Rout. It is a customer service platform designed to help teams manage customer queries and requests across communication channels.

== History ==
Hiver began as GrexIt in 2011, founded by Nitesh Nandy and Niraj Ranjan Rout. The product was initially developed in 2010 while the founders participated in The Morpheus startup accelerator. The startup later joined the Citrix Startup Accelerator and received undisclosed investment from Citrix and Vijay Shekhar Sharma.

A beta version of GrexIt was released in 2011, with functionality aimed at enabling workplace collaboration within email inboxes. The product was publicly launched in 2012. Early versions of GrexIt centered on two functions: shared email labels that synchronized messages across team inboxes to support assignment and status tracking, and a cloud-based shared email repository that provided organization-wide access to relevant threads for collaborative input.

In 2015, GrexIt renamed its product to Hiver with increased functionalities from email-boxes. It incorporated email project management among other services.

In October 2018, the company raised US$4 million in funding from Kalaari Capital and Kae Capital. During this period, the product shifted from a general email-based collaboration tool to a shared inbox system delivered through a web browser extension that runs inside Gmail. The update introduced additional tools, including email assignment, internal comments with @mentions, collision detection, message templates, scheduling, shared drafts, and basic rule-based automation for email categorization and routing.

In February 2021, Hiver raised $4 million in debt financing Mars Growth Capital. In March 2022, the company announced a US$22 million Series B round led by K1 Capital, with participation from existing investors Kalaari Capital, Kae Capital, and AngelList.

As of 2024, Hiver functions as an AI-enabled help desk built for teams using Google Workspace, providing shared inbox management, workflow automation, analytics, a knowledge base, and support for channels including email, live chat, voice calls, and WhatsApp, with AI used for drafting replies and routine tasks.

== Operations and product ==
Niraj Ranjan Rout, serves as the company's chief executive officer, and Nitesh Nandy, the company's chief technology officer; Meena Kumari R is the chief people officer. Hiver is headquartered in San Jose, California, while also maintaining operations in Bengaluru, India.

Hiver includes a suite of artificial intelligence features designed to support customer service workflows. AI Copilot enables users to search internal documentation, summarize extended email threads, and generate or refine response drafts within the inbox. Automated functions can classify incoming messages, identify intent and sentiment, route queries to appropriate teams, and perform actions such as tagging or updating connected systems.

The platform's analytics capabilities track performance metrics such as response and resolution times, ticket volume by channel, and adherence to service-level agreements. Reporting features allow filtering by various dimensions, including queue, assignee, tag, and time period. Customer satisfaction scores and agent workload data can also be incorporated into reports.

== See also ==
- Help desk software
- IT service management
- Collaborative software
- Customer relationship management
