= One97 Communications =

Indian multinational technology company

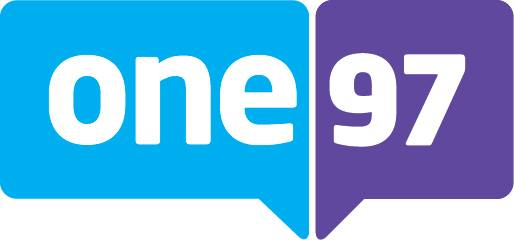
- Type: Public
- Industry: Technology
- Founded: 2000; 26 years ago in New Delhi, India
- Founder: Vijay Shekhar Sharma
- Headquarters: Noida, Uttar Pradesh, India
- Area served: Worldwide
- Key people: Vijay Shekhar Sharma (CEO)
- Products: Paytm; Paytm Mall; Paytm Payments Services; Paytm Money; Paytm Insurance; Paytm First Games; Paytm Smart Retail; Paytm Insider
- Brands: Paytm
- Website: one97.com

One97 Communications Ltd. is an Indian multinational technology company, headquartered in Noida. It was founded in 2000 by Vijay Shekhar Sharma. Through its subsidiaries and businesses, the company offers digital payment and financial services to consumers and merchants in India. It also provides mobile advertising, marketing and payments for merchants.

In 2021, the company became publicly listed after the largest ever initial public offering (IPO) in India's history. It was listed on Indian stock exchanges on 08 November 2021.

== History ==
One97 Communications Limited was founded in 2000 by Vijay Shekhar Sharma in New Delhi. The company is headquartered in Noida, India. It launched Paytm in 2009 as a digital payments platform to facilitate cashless payments. It owns various businesses and subsidiaries – Paytm Payments Bank, Paytm Payments Gateway, Paytm Payout, Paytm Money, Paytm Insider, Paytm Insurance, Paytm Postpaid, Paytm for Business, Paytm Credit Cards, and Paytm First Games.

== Divisions ==
=== Paytm Money ===
Paytm Money is an Indian wealth-technology platform and stock broker, operating as a division of One97 Communications, the parent company of Paytm. Headquartered in Delhi, it offers retail investors access to equities, derivatives, mutual funds, exchange-traded funds (ETFs), initial public offerings (IPOs), fixed income instruments, and retirement products.

Paytm Money was incorporated in 2017 as a wholly owned subsidiary of One97 Communications, and launched in 2018 with direct mutual fund investments. Between 2019 and 2021, the platform included stock broking, retirement products, and futures & options trading.

In 2023, the company introduced a bonds investment platform and reported profitability for FY 2022–23, citing brokerage income growth.

=== Paytm Travel ===
Paytm Travel is the online travel services division of One97 Communications, the parent company of Paytm. Headquartered in Noida, Uttar Pradesh, it provides booking solutions for flights, trains, buses and hotels, including Tatkal train tickets and international flights. The travel division is headed by Vikash Jalan as CEO.

Initially began with railway ticket booking with the IRCTC, the company launched a travel marketplace, starting with bus ticket bookings in 2015 through aggregator partnerships.

In 2019, Paytm acquired NightStay, a last-minute hotel booking platform, marking its entry into the hospitality segment.

In 2024, Paytm announced partnerships with global aggregators including Skyscanner, Google Flights, and Wego to expand international booking options. By early 2025, Paytm partnered with Agoda to provide hotel booking options in India and overseas markets.

== Funding ==
In October 2011, One97 Communications received funding of $10 million from Sapphire Ventures. In January 2015, Ant Financial Services Group picked 25% stake in the company. In March 2015, Ratan Tata made a personal investment in One97 Communications's Paytm and joined as an adviser of the company. It received funding of $60 million from MediaTek's investment funds Mountain Capital, which made the company's valuation at $4.8 billion in August 2016.

In May 2017, the company raised $1.4 billion from Japan's SoftBank Group, which made its valuation jumped to over $8 billion. Paytm raised $300 million from Warren Buffett’s Berkshire Hathaway in September 2018. In November 2019, the company secured $1 billion in a Series G funding led by T Rowe Price and existing investors Ant Financial and SoftBank Vision Fund. Discovery Capital also participated in the round. Paytm raised Rs 9,000 crore ($1.4 billion) from SoftBank.

== Acquisition ==
In December 2012, the company acquired MobiVite, a mobile marketing platform followed by the acquisition of Plustx, a cross-messaging platform in August 2013.

== IPO ==
One97 Communications was scheduled to launch its IPO In November 2010. However, it shelved the listing plans last moment, citing volatile market conditions. On 16 July 2021, the company filed draft prospectus for its IPO of up to ₹16,600 crore and various news outlets reported it to be India's largest Initial public offering ever. It is listed on National Stock Exchange of India and Bombay Stock Exchange since November 2021.

The company's initial share sale aimed to raise ₹18,300 crore at a band of ₹2,080-2,150, valuing it at ₹1.39 trillion. The company's IPO was subscribed 18% on the first day, having received bids for 8.742 million shares against the total issue size of 48.4 million shares. Its IPO was subscribed 48% on the second day and it was fully subscribed on the final day of the issue. However, its shares fell 13% and 27% respectively on the days succeeding its listing and has continued to slide sparking criticism on its valuation methodologies, inviting regulatory scrutiny.

== Finances ==
According to RedSeer, it has the largest payments platform in India with a gross merchant value of Rs 4,033 billion in the financial year 2021. According to its annual 2021 report, One97's revenue from operations dropped 14% to Rs 2,802 crore for FY 2021. However, losses narrowed to Rs 1,701 crore during this year, compared to Rs 2,942 crore loss reported in the fiscal year 2020.

One97 Communications reduced losses by 28% to Rs 2,833 crore in the FY 2019-20. Its overall expenses were reduced by 20% in 2019-20 to Rs 5,861 crore compared to Rs 7,254 crore in 2019-18. Its revenue also declined 1% to Rs 3,350 crore in FY20.

== Awards and recognition ==
In August 2009, One97 Communications was awarded the Emerging Company of The Year at the 10th Annual Voice&Data Award 2009 for its contribution to the VAS space. That same year, it was also awarded the Deloitte Technology Fast50 India award. In December 2010, One97 Communications won the Best Digital Innovation category for its 'TalktoMe' product at the Internet and Mobile Association of India (IAMAI) Digital Awards It won Company of the Year at ET Now-IndiaMART Leaders of Tomorrow Awards 2010. In May 2011, One97's product Talk2Me was awarded the Best Innovative VAS Product at the ET Telecom Awards by The Economic Times. One97 Communications was ranked #493 in the Deloitte Technology Fast 500 Asia Pacific list in 2012. The company was awarded the VCCircle Annual Awards 2013 for the best PE/VC-backed Media & Communication Company.

In March 2014, One97 was announced as the Most Innovative Company of the Year 2014 at the Business Standard's Awards. In July 2015, it won NDTV's Disruptive Digital Innovator Award. The company was ranked #309 in the list of Fortune Next 500 company for the year 2017.
