= GIFT One Tower =

Commercial Skyscraper in India

GIFT One
- GIFT One Tower
- Interactive map of the GIFT One area

General information
- Status: Completed
- Type: Residential, Commercial (Hotel)
- Location: GIFT City Road, GIFT City, India
- Coordinates: 23°9′52.99″N 72°40′48.58″E
- Completed: 2013
- Opening: January 10, 2013
- Owner: Gujarat Urban Development Company Limited; Infrastructure Leasing & Financial Services

Height
- Top floor: 122 metres (400.3 ft)

Technical details
- Material: Glass/Concrete
- Floor count: 28
- Floor area: 30,000 m^{2} (320,000 sq ft)
- Lifts/elevators: 14

Design and construction
- Architect: HOK

The GIFT ONE Tower is a 122-meter-tall, 29-story office building located in the heart of GIFT City. It is one of the tallest buildings in Gujarat and features a modern glass facade and facilities for businesses and offices. It was inaugurated by Indian Prime Minister Narendra Modi in July 2013.

== Gallery ==
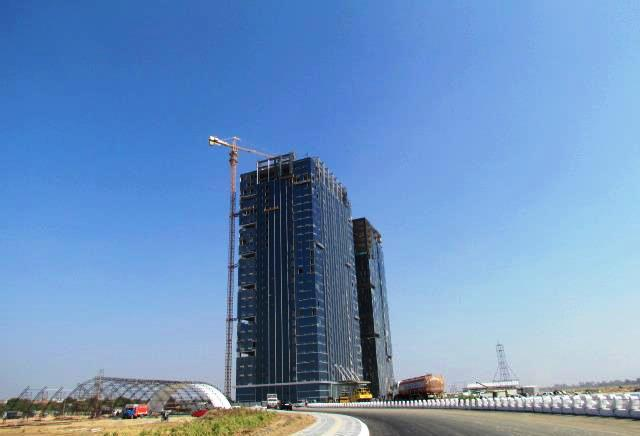
GIFT One Tower being constructed

GIFT One & Two Tower
