= Vijay Shekhar Sharma =

Indian businessman (born 1978)

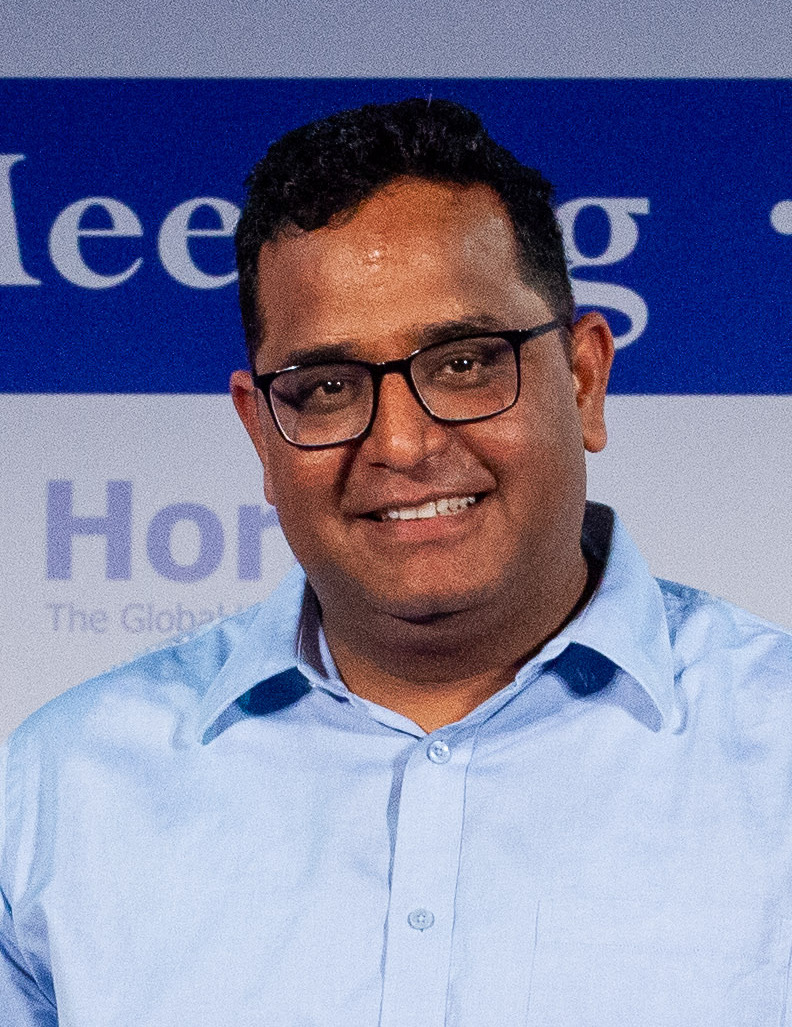
- Sharma in 2019
- Born: 7 June 1978 (age 48); Aligarh, Uttar Pradesh, India
- Education: Delhi Technological University (B.Tech)
- Occupation: Businessman
- Known for: Founder & CEO of Paytm
- Spouse: Mridula Parashar (m. 2005)
- Children: 1
- Awards: Yash Bharati

Vijay Shekhar Sharma (born 7 June 1978) is an Indian technology entrepreneur known as the founder and chief executive officer of One97 Communications and its consumer brand Paytm.

In January 2022, the ICANN-supported Universal Acceptance Steering Group appointed him as its Universal Acceptance (UA) Ambassador in India. As of September 2022, he had a net worth of US$1.1 billion according to Forbes.

== Early life and education ==
Vijay Shekhar Sharma was born in Aligarh, Uttar Pradesh on 7 June 1978, the third of the four children of Sulom Prakash Sharma, a schoolteacher, and Asha Sharma, a homemaker. He did his schooling from Harduaganj, a small town near Aligarh. He enrolled in college at the age of 15 and graduated with a B.Tech degree from the Delhi College of Engineering (now Delhi Technological University) at 19 years old

== Career ==
In 1997, while in college, he started the website indiasite.net, and sold it two years later for US$1 million. Three years later, in 2000, he started One97 Communications which offered mobile content including news, cricket scores, ringtones, jokes and exam results. One97 Communications Limited is the parent company of Paytm, a digital payments and financial services company that was launched by Sharma in 2010. In November 2021, Paytm went public raising $2.5 billion at a valuation of $19 billion, making it India's largest initial public offering at that time.

Sharma is also an angel investor who has supported tech startups. He has backed a range of companies, including Innov8, InnerChef, GOQii, Zapr, and Hiver, among others.

Sharma joined the board of management at Netaji Subhas University of Technology in Delhi for three years.

In 2024, Sharma stepped down from his role as part-time non-executive chairman and board member of Paytm Payments Bank. This decision followed regulatory challenges encountered by the bank with the Reserve Bank of India.

== Awards and recognition ==
Vijay Shekhar Sharma, Founder and CEO of Paytm, receiving the Excellence in AI-Powered Financial Inclusion Award 2025 on behalf of Paytm from the Asian Digital Finance Forum & Awards at the India Pavilion during Singapore FinTech Festival 2026, held at Singapore EXPO.

- Won the Best Serial Entrepreneur Award at the Rural and Urban Development Summit and Awards 2022 presented by the Minister of State for the Ministry of Housing and Urban Affairs, Government of India.
- Ranked the Youngest Indian Billionaire by Forbes magazine
- In 2018, he was named the Entrepreneur of the Year by AIMA
- Time Magazine's 100 most influential people in 2017.
- ET Entrepreneur of the Year, by The Economic Times in 2016
- Ranked by GQ in their listing of the 50 most influential young Indians of 2017.
- In 2017, he became the Dataquest IT Man of the year.
- Received an Honorary doctorate from Amity University, Gurgaon, in 2016
- Honored with the Yash Bharati, the highest state civilian award of the Government of Uttar Pradesh in 2016.
- Named as the Businessman of the Year at GQ Men of the Year Awards 2016.
- He was conferred with the NDTV Indian of the Year in 2016.
- Awarded the Impact Person of the Year Award in 2016.
- Named India's Hottest Business Leader under 40 by The Economic Times in 2015.
- In September 2015, he was named CEO of the Year by SABRE Award.

== Angel investor ==
He has been an angel investor in emerging technologies, supporting around 80 startups. His portfolio includes companies Temple, Bombay Shirt Company, Kawa Space, HackerEarth, NoBroker, Treebo, Karkinos Healthcare, and TrulyMadly.

== Personal life ==
He is married to Mridula Parashar Sharma and they have a child.

== Other work ==
Sharma has been named as the UN Environment's 'Patron for Clean Air', where he helps to drive environmental action and awareness and advocate for the goals of United Nations Environment's global Breathe Life campaign.

== See also ==
- List of Indian entrepreneurs
- List of Internet entrepreneurs
