= Nium =

Singapore-headquartered cross-border payments company

- Website type: Private company
- Founded: 2014
- Headquarters: Singapore
- Area served: Asia Pacific, Canada, Europe, United States
- Founders: Prajit Nanu, Michael Bermingham
- CEO: Prajit Nanu
- Key people: Prajit Nanu (Co-Founder, CEO); Michael Bermingham (Co-Founder, COO)
- Industry: Financial services
- Products: Instarem
- Services: International Money Transfer
- Employees: >750 (2021)
- Website: www.nium.com
- Launched: August 2015
- Written in: C#, Node.js, Java

Nium is a Singapore-headquartered cross-border payments company. Initially founded by Prajit Nanu and Michael Bermingham, and launched as a consumer-remittance platform Instarem in 2014. In 2016, the company introduced its B2B payments platform and rebranded as Nium in 2019, subsequently elevating Pratik Gandhi to co-founder in 2021. However, Gandhi left Nium in October 2023, around the time Nium's Chief Product Officer also left the company and Nium announced a layoff of over 10% of its global staff.

== History ==
Founders Prajit Nanu and Michael Bermingham developed a solution to provide transparent and secure cross-border remittances for overseas money transfers with close to live exchange rates. Instarem was incorporated based on the premise of instant online remittances.

By 2017, the company had begun to operate a cross-border payments platform targeted at business users, including banks and businesses. It opened offices in the UK, Hong Kong, Malaysia, acquiring Electronic Money Transfer licenses in Malaysia and the EU. It hit $1 billion USD in dollars processed in the same year. In 2018, real-time delivery of funds reached 50+ countries and the company launched its card-issuing platform. Subsequently, in 2019, the company rebranded to Nium with the launch of the Nium platform, with Instarem continuing to operate as a wholly owned consumer service.

In 2021, the company made its first acquisitions: Ixaris, a travel payments optimization firm and then Wirecard Forex, a payments services company in India. In April 2022, Nium acquired the alternative payments network Socash.

Also in 2021, the International Cricket Council (ICC) and Nium entered a multi-year strategic partnership involving and integrating several global ICC events through the end of 2023 - the ICC Men's T20 World Cup in the United Arab Emirates and Oman; the ICC Men's T20 World Cup in Australia; the ICC Women’s World Cup in South Africa; the ICC World Test Championship Final in 2023; and, the ICC Men's Cricket World Cup 2023 to be hosted in India.

In January 2022, Nium strengthened its senior leadership team by appointing Robin Gandhi as Chief Product Officer. Before joining Nium, Gandhi led the product, engineering, design, and operations efforts at TripActions, after previous stints at Adyen. Gandhi subsequently left Nium in September 2023.

In March 2022, Nium announced the appointment of Dylan Lowrey to General Counsel. Lowrey joined Nium in 2021 as Head of Regulatory Affairs and Product Law. Before it, Dylan led the global Payments Product Legal team at Stripe and served as Vice President and Acting US Head of Legal for Corporate Banking at Barclays.

Nium announced on 26 April 2022 its agreement to acquire Socash Pte Ltd, a Singapore alternative payments network focused on non-traditional physical outlets. The acquisition also provided Nium with the International Remittance Hub license from Bank Negara Malaysia (the country's central bank). In May, it announced the availability of real-time payments in Malaysia. And now, Nium processes more than 80% of transactions worldwide in real-time.

From June 2022, Nium has partnered with the Stellar Development Foundation (SDF), a non-profit that supports the growth of public blockchain Stellar, to enable payouts to 190 countries.

In August 2022, Nium announced the appointment of Ramana Satyavarapu as Chief Technology Officer. Satyavarapu brings over 20 years of software engineering expertise from Microsoft, Google, Uber, Two Sigma and Finix.

In October 2022, Nium teamed with B2B2C crypto infrastructure platform Zero Hash in a partnership that lets Nium's U.S. customers leverage crypto to fiat payment solutions.

Also, In October, Nium appointed two new board members, Huey Lin and David Yates. The new independent directors have guided several organizations through stages of rapid growth. Huey Lin is a venture partner with GGV Capital, while David Yates is an executive partner at Siris Capital Group.

In November 2022, Nium launched a closed-loop payments solution, Nium Airline Payments (NAP), powered by Universal Air Travel Plan (UATP). NAP provides airlines, travel agents, and online travel agencies (OTAs) sustainable closed-loop payment model.

In December 2022, Paycell, Türkiye's digital payment platform, announced a strategic partnership with Nium to offer international money transfers from account to account using Nium's business payments infrastructure.

In 2023, Nium's CEO, Prajit Nanu, stated in a Bloomberg interview that his company plans to go public in the US by Q2 2025. They also intend to acquire two to three payments startups, particularly in Africa, the Middle East, and Latin America.

Following a hiring spree in 2021-2022, Instarem, a company under Nium, laid off around 10% of its employees in mid-2023. Subsequently, Nium announced a 10% workforce reduction on October 2, 2023 to its global employees. The news came just weeks after a grand opening of new offices in London and Singapore.

n April 2024, Nium expanded its partnership with Thredd, a global payments processor, to issue virtual cards in the Asia Pacific region for B2B travel payments. The partnership had issued 86 million virtual cards since 2018.

In June 2024, Nium raised US$50 million in a Series E funding round led by the Brunei Investment Agency.

In September 2024, Nium revised its IPO timeline, shifting the target for its planned US public listing from the second quarter of 2025 to the end of 2026. The company cited the need to strengthen its leadership team ahead of the listing.

In January 2025, Nium launched a Diners Club International card for global travel partners, expanding payment network options for online travel agents and airline partners.

In March 2025, Nium announced a partnership with G2 Travel, a wholesale tour operator, to provide virtual card payments to hotel partners globally in over 20 local currencies.

In November 2025, Nium announced its participation in Visa's stablecoin settlement pilot, enabling settlement using USDC on supported blockchains for cross-border payments.

In February 2026, Nium appointed Chandrasekhar Cidambi as Chief Technology Officer, Amaresh Mohan as Chief Risk and Compliance Officer, and Danielle Gotkis as Chief Marketing Officer.

== Investors and funding ==
In January 2015, Global Founders Capital, Germany-based Venture Capital arm of Rocket Internet Founders, invested US$500,000 as seed round of funding in Instarem that helped the company develop its money transfer platform.

In March 2016, Instarem received an investment of US$5 million in Series A from Vertex Ventures Southeast Asia & India (part of the Vertex Holdings network of funds), Fullerton Financial Holdings and Global Founders Capital, to acquire licenses for money transfer business in other markets.

This was followed by Series B round of US$13 million in July 2017, led by GSR Ventures, with participation from SBI-FMO Ventures, Vertex Ventures Southeast Asia & India, Fullerton Financial Holdings, and Global Founders Capital. The company will use this investment to further build its global payment infrastructure by way of increasing its payment corridors from 150 to around 2000.

In November 2018, the company raised a Series C round of over $20 million, directed towards growth in new emerging markets in Latin America and Europe.

This was followed by a private equity investment round of over $20 million ref in May 2020 by BRI Ventures, the corporate venture division of Bank BRI of Indonesia, and Visa.

By July 2021, the company had raised a Series D round of USD$200M. The company has since been characterized as a “unicorn.” Its valuation as of February 2022 was estimated at $2bn.

== Investigations ==
The Directorate of Enforcement (ED) froze Rs 123 crore, belonging to Singapore-based shell entities, parked in bank accounts of Mumbai-based NIUM Indian Pvt Ltd as part of its probe into a money laundering case of illegal online loans, gambling, and betting apps through a cluster of mule accounts in Kerala.

== See also ==
- Remittances
- Money services business
- Foreign exchange market
- Financial technology
