= International Financial Services Centres Authority =

Financial regulatory authority in India

- State Emblem of India

- Logo of IFSCA

Agency overview
- Formed: April 27, 2020; 6 years ago (Established) (under the International Financial Services Centres Authority Act, 2019)
- Type: Regulatory agency
- Jurisdiction: GIFT International Financial Services Centre
- Headquarters: GIFT City, India
- Employees: 200
- Agency executive: K. Rajaraman, Chairman
- Parent department: Government of India
- Child agency: See list
- Website: ifsca.gov.in

The International Financial Services Centres Authority (IFSCA) is the regulatory agency for the Indian special economic zones such as the GIFT International Financial Services Centre for International Financial Services and commodity markets under the ownership of the Government of India. It was established in 2020, under the International Financial Services Centres Authority Act, 2019. The International Financial Services Centre (IFSC) is located in GIFT City, India.

== History ==
=== Developments that led to the IFSCA ===
In December 2015 the first International Financial Services Centre (IFSC) in India was set up in Gujarat International Finance Tec-City (GIFT City).

In 2019 the Government of India enacted an Act of Parliament called the International Financial Services Centres Authority Act, 2019.

=== Establishment ===
On April 27, 2020, The IFSCA was established as a statutory body under the International Financial Services Centres Authority Act, 2019. On April 27, 2020, inauguration of the IFSCA by the Finance Minister of India, Nirmala Sitharaman.

On May 27, 2020, the IFSCA released its first set of regulations, namely the IFSCA (Banking) Regulations, 2020.

=== Developments ===
On June 17, 2020, the IFSCA signed an MoU with the Monetary Authority of Singapore (MAS) to strengthen cooperation in financial services between India and Singapore.

On July 1, 2020, the IFSCA announced the launch of its regulatory sandbox framework for testing innovative financial products, services, and business models.

On September 1, 2020, the IFSCA issued the IFSCA (Insurance) Regulations, 2020, for regulating the insurance sector in the IFSC.

On December 7, 2020, the IFSCA signed an MoU with the Abu Dhabi Global Market (ADGM) to promote and develop the financial services industry in their respective jurisdictions.

On February 17, 2021, the IFSCA issued the IFSCA (Capital Market Intermediaries) Regulations, 2021, for regulating capital market intermediaries in the IFSC. On March 16, 2021, the IFSCA issued the IFSCA (Investment Advisors) Regulations, 2021, for regulating investment advisors in the IFSCA.

== Organisation structure ==
The International Financial Services Centres Authority (IFSCA) is headed by a chairperson who is appointed by the Government of India. The chairperson is assisted by a full-time Member (Finance) and such number of other Members as may be appointed by the Central Government.

Chairperson	K. Rajaraman	
Department	Head of Department	Divisions
Banking	Kumar Raghuraman	Banking Regulations -1, Banking Regulations -2, Banking Supervision, Finance Company Regulations
Capital Markets	Pradeep Ramakrishnan	Corporate Finance – Equity, Hybrid and related products, Corporate Finance – Debt and Sustainable Finance, Market Infrastructure Institutions – Regulation and Supervision, Division of Supervision of Intermediaries, Investment Funds - I and New Products & Services, Investment Funds - II and Aircraft Leasing
Insurance	Praveen Trivedi	Insurance
Metals and Commodities	Pradeep Ramakrishnan	Strategic Research and Co-ordination for Market Development & Regulation, Regulatory Policy, Risk Management, and Supervision, Product Regulation, Vault Managers and Co-ordination
Development	Dipesh Shah	Development of Financial Market – I, Development of Financial Market – II & International Affairs
Economic Policy and Analysis		Economic Policy and Analysis
General Administration	Praveen Trivedi	Administration & HR, Treasury, Finance and Accounts
IT and Fintech	Joseph Joshy C J	IT, Fintech
Legal Policy and Legal Affairs	Praveen Trivedi	Legal Policy, Legal Affairs
Regulatory Policy and Regulatory Affairs	Prasanna Seshchellam	Regulatory Cooperation, Risk Based Supervision, SupTech, FATF Cell

== Subsidiary ==
The International Financial Services Centres Authority (IFSCA) has several child agencies or subsidiary bodies that help it carry out its functions. Some of these agencies are:

1. International Financial Services Centres Authority Advisory Committee (IFSCA-AC) - This committee advises the IFSCA on various issues related to the development and regulation of financial services in IFSCs.
2. International Financial Services Centres Authority Committee on Fund Administration (IFSCA-CFA) - This committee regulates and oversees the functioning of fund administration services in IFSCs.
3. International Financial Services Centres Authority Committee on Depository Receipts (IFSCA-CDR) - This committee regulates and oversees the issuance and trading of depository receipts in IFSCs.
4. International Financial Services Centres Authority Committee on Market Infrastructure Institutions (IFSCA-CMII) - This committee regulates and oversees the functioning of market infrastructure institutions like stock exchanges, clearing corporations, and depositories in IFSCs.
5. International Financial Services Centres Authority Committee on Financial Benchmarks (IFSCA-CFB) - This committee regulates and oversees the functioning of financial benchmarks in IFSCs.
6. International Financial Services Centres Authority Committee on Investment Advisers (IFSCA-CIA) - This committee regulates and oversees the functioning of investment advisers in IFSCs.
7. International Financial Services Centres Authority Committee on Commodity Derivatives Markets (IFSCA-CCDM) - This committee regulates and oversees the functioning of commodity derivatives markets in IFSCs.
8. International Financial Services Centres Authority Committee on Regulatory Sandbox (IFSCA-CRS) - This committee facilitates the testing and experimentation of innovative financial products, services, and technologies in a controlled environment in IFSCs.
9. International Financial Services Centres Authority Committee on Financial Services (IFSCA-CFS) - This committee regulates and oversees the functioning of all financial services in IFSCs.
10. International Financial Services Centres Authority Committee on Regulation of Depositories (IFSCA-CRD) - This committee regulates and oversees the functioning of depositories in IFSCs.
11. International Financial Services Centres Authority Committee on Accounting Standards (IFSCA-CAS) - This committee regulates and oversees the adoption of accounting standards in IFSCs.
12. International Financial Services Centres Authority Committee on Cyber Security (IFSCA-CCS) - This committee regulates and oversees the cyber security and data protection measures taken by entities in IFSCs.
13. International Financial Services Centres Authority Committee on Money Market and Foreign Exchange Markets (IFSCA-CMFM) - This committee regulates and oversees the functioning of money market and foreign exchange markets in IFSCs.
14. International Financial Services Centres Authority Committee on Governance and Ethics (IFSCA-CGE) - This committee promotes good governance and ethical practices in entities operating in IFSCs.
15. International Financial Services Centres Authority Committee on Risk Management (IFSCA-CRM) - This committee regulates and oversees the risk management practices adopted by entities in IFSCs.
16. International Financial Services Centres Authority Committee on Insurance (IFSCA-CI) - This committee regulates and oversees the functioning of insurance services in IFSCs.
17. International Financial Services Centres Authority Committee on Retail Business Development (IFSCA-CRBD) - To develop international retail business along with potential strategies for making IFSC attractive for international financial services .

== Functions and responsibilities ==
The International Financial Services Centres Authority (IFSCA) has been established to regulate and develop financial services in the International Financial Services Centres (IFSCs) located in India. Here are the key functions and responsibilities of IFSCA:

- Regulatory and development functions: The IFSCA is responsible for regulating financial services and products offered in the IFSCs, including banking, insurance, securities markets, and other financial products and services. It is also responsible for promoting and developing the IFSCs in India.
- Granting of approvals and permissions: The IFSCA has the power to grant approvals and permissions to entities operating in the IFSCs, including financial institutions, intermediaries, and other service providers.
- Promoting International Financial Services Centre: The IFSCA is responsible for promoting IFSCs and developing them into world-class financial centers. It has the power to enter into MoUs with other regulatory bodies, financial institutions, and governments of foreign countries to promote financial services in IFSCs.
- Framing of regulations and rules: The IFSCA has the power to frame regulations and rules for the conduct of financial services and products in the IFSCs. It can also make recommendations to the Central Government on matters related to the regulation and development of financial services in the IFSCs.
- Regulating Capital Markets: The IFSCA regulates capital markets in IFSCs and has the power to issue regulations, guidelines, and directions for entities operating in these markets.
- Regulating Banking Services: The IFSCA regulates banking services in IFSCs and has the power to issue regulations, guidelines, and directions for entities operating in these services.
- Regulating Insurance Services: The IFSCA regulates insurance services in IFSCs and has the power to issue regulations, guidelines, and directions for entities operating in these services.
- Monitoring and surveillance: The IFSCA is responsible for monitoring and conducting surveillance of the financial services and products offered in the IFSCs to ensure compliance with regulations and rules.
- Dispute resolution: The IFSCA has the power to resolve disputes arising out of financial transactions in the IFSCs, including between parties located in the IFSCs and parties located outside the IFSCs.
- International cooperation: The IFSCA can enter into agreements with other regulatory bodies and organizations outside India to promote and develop the financial services industry in the IFSCs and to enhance international cooperation in this regard.

== Departments ==
The International Financial Services Centres Authority (IFSCA) is a regulatory authority established by the Government of India to develop and regulate the financial services market. The IFSCA has several departments to oversee different areas of financial services.

== Awards and recognition ==
International Financial Services Centres Authority (IFSCA) was recognised with the “Outstanding New Asian Regulatory and Technological Innovation in Financial Services” at the ‘Asian Digital Finance Forum & Awards 2023’ which was held at Hilton Colombo in Sri Lanka.

== See also ==
- Securities and Exchange Board of India
- Reserve Bank of India
- List of financial supervisory authorities by country
