= GIFT City =

Central business district in Gujarat, India

- Smart City
- Gujarat International Finance-Tec City
- Drone view of GIFT City Night view BIFC TIER – IV Data Centre GIFT Towers GIFT One Tower BSE Brokers Forum

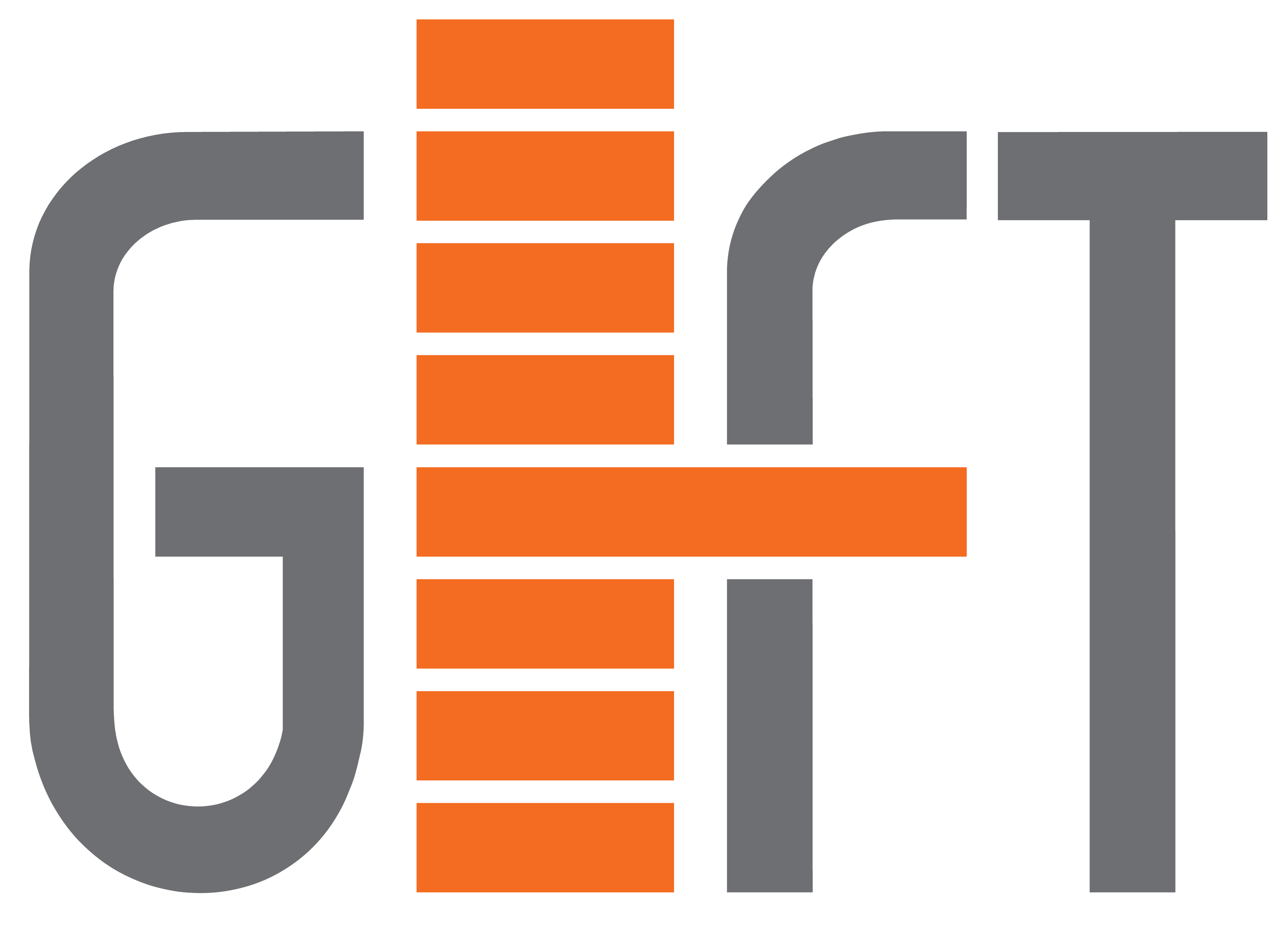
- Interactive map of GIFT City
- Country: India
- State: Gujarat
- District: Gandhinagar
- Administrative division: GIFT International Financial Services Centre; GIFT Domestic Tariff Area
- Metro: Ahmedabad Metro
- Establishment: 10 April 2015
- Founder: Narendra Modi

Government
  - Body: Gujarat International Finance Tec-City Company Limited

Area
  - Total: 15.5 km^{2} (6.0 sq mi)

Language
  - Official: Gujarati, Hindi, English
- Time zone: UTC+5:30 (IST)
- Pincode(s): 382426
- Area code: 091
- Website: www.giftgujarat.in

Gujarat International Finance Tec-City, also called GIFT City, is India's first International Financial Services Centre and a greenfield smart city on the banks of the Sabarmati River in Gujarat's Gandhinagar district. In 2020, GIFT IFSC ranked 10th in the Global Financial Centres Index. In 2025, it was ranked 40th in fintech and 46th overall in the Global Financial Centres Index, which included 119 financial centres.

GIFT City is around 12 km (7.5 mi) from Sardar Vallabhbhai Patel International Airport. It includes commercial, financial and residential complexes, and is designed to be a walkable city. It is connected through 4–6 lane state and national highways, and the GIFT City metro station links it to the Ahmedabad Metro network. The total development area is 359 hectares (886 acres), of which the special economic zone (SEZ) constitutes 106 hectares (261 acres). In July 2025, Sanjay Kaul was appointed managing director and Group CEO.

Several multinational banks, including JP Morgan, Standard Chartered, Deutsche Bank, Citibank, HSBC. Barclays Bank, Bank of America, DFCC Bank, and Qatar National Bank have set up offices at the IFSC. In addition, the city hosts 35 fintech entities, two international stock exchanges with average daily trading volumes of $30.6 billion, and India's first international bullion exchange with 75 jewellers. Two Australian universities have also established a presence in the city as of November 2023. The city's name signifies the government's intention to promote it as a global financial and business services hub.

The city has fallen short of its promises: against projected 10 lakh jobs, only about 9,000 by mid-2019, with just 3 out of the 62 million square feet built. The government blamed the financial crisis, the absence of regulators until 2014, and IL&FS's financial difficulties. Even by late 2023, the city remained sparse after business hours, prompting Singapore's High Commissioner to call it "quite a ghost town". The tax breaks and incentives given to businesses were compared with the government establishing a tax-haven; the government defended the framework as a well-regulated tax architecture.

== History ==
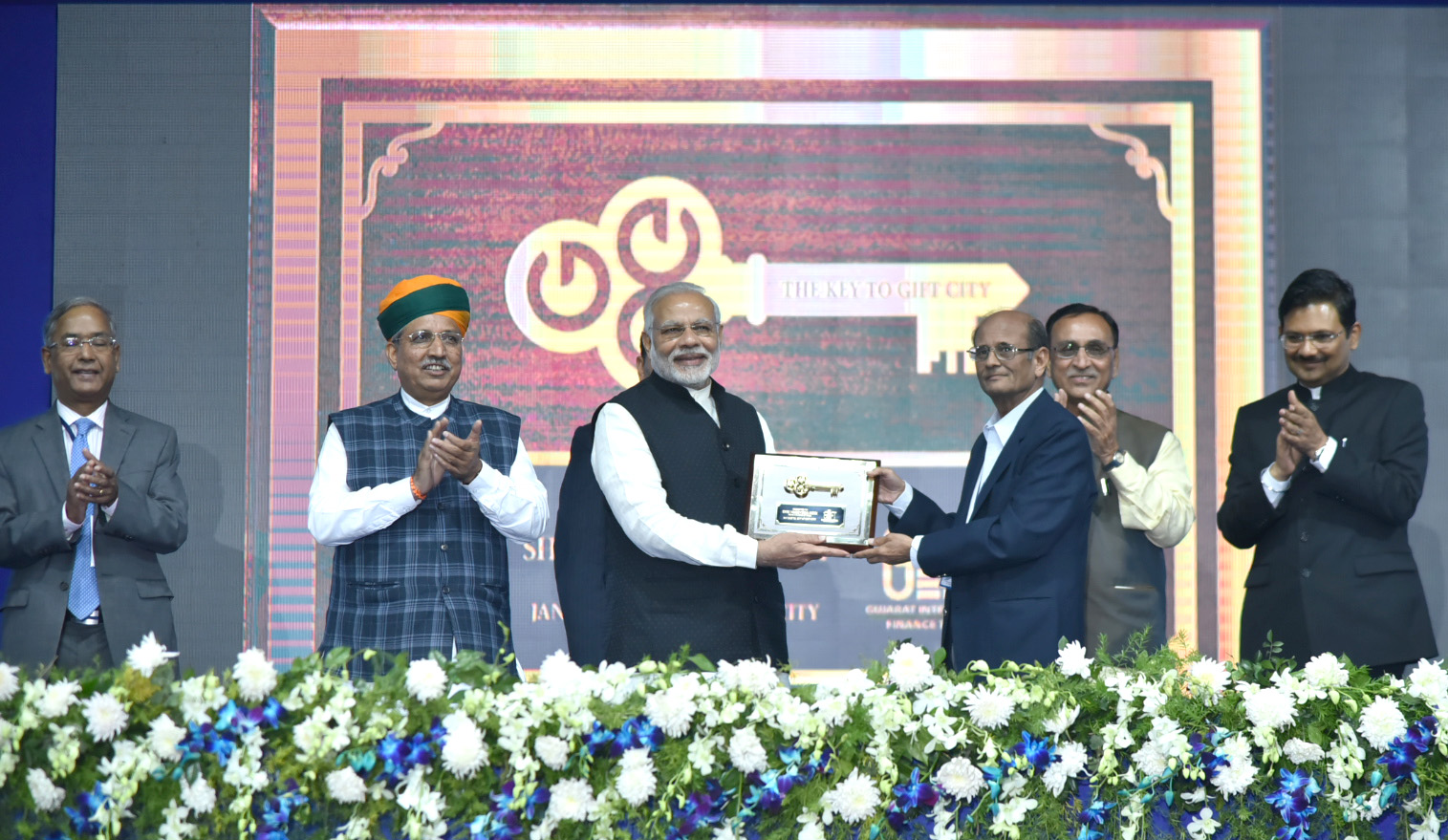
Prime Minister Narendra Modi in 2017 at the India International Exchange inauguration ceremony in GIFT City.

On 15 December 2011, The Economic Times reported city officials in GIFT were inviting companies from Singapore that wished to expand but could not do so due to a lack of land in Singapore to open their businesses in GIFT. Investments from banks, private equity companies, insurance companies and asset management companies were considered.

On 26 December 2011, The Times of India reported China's technology giant Huawei was likely to provide technology to GIFT. According to Eric Yu, president, of enterprise business of Huawei India, this technology included networks, data centres and surveillance.

On 2 October 2014, NetIndian reported a new World Trade Centre would be set up in GIFT City as per an agreement between the World Trade Centre India Services Council (WTCS) and GIFT City Ltd. It would be completed within four years.

BSE Broker's Forum planned to invest ₹1.2 billion (equivalent to ₹1.8 billion or US$19 million in 2026) to build a commercial tower to set up back-office operations. They were allocated 28,000 square metres (300,000 sq ft) to develop the commercial tower with the likelihood of setting up an exchange office.

According to The Times of India on 18 October 2014, the Bangalore-based Brigade Group would invest ₹5 billion (equivalent to ₹8.7 billion or US$91 million in 2026) over the next few years to develop 0.10 million square metres (1.1 million square feet) of built-up area with a future option of investing another ₹6 billion (equivalent to ₹10 billion or US$110 million in 2026) to develop 0.16 million square metres (1.7×10^{6} sq ft).

In November 2018, The Wire reported the Government of Gujarat State would buy out the 50% stake of beleaguered Infrastructure Leasing & Financial Services (IL&FS) in the GIFT City to minimize delays to the project. In June, 2020, IL&FS concluded sale of its stake in GIFT-City for ₹320 million (equivalent to ₹410 million or US$4.3 million in 2026) equity value to the state government.

According to Business Standard, OPS Fund Services, a subsidiary of OPS Global, Singapore, received a license to open in the International Financial Service Centre at GIFT city.

On 5 December 2019, Business Standard reported that Bank of America opened a Global Business Services Center at GIFT.

On 6 January 2020, Accor opened the first international hotel in GIFT City.

On 20 January 2020, The Economic Times reported GIFT was ready to begin trading in rupee-dollar in the futures market.

In July 2022, JPMorgan Chase, Deutsche Bank and Mitsubishi UFJ Financial Group opened new offices at the International Financial Services Centre. Prime Minister Narendra Modi formally opened Singapore Exchange's futures trading operation "Nifty", and India's first international bullion exchange was opened.

In December 2025, Business Standard reported IDFC FIRST Bank opened a IFSC banking Unit in GIFT City

== Implementation ==
=== Construction timeline ===
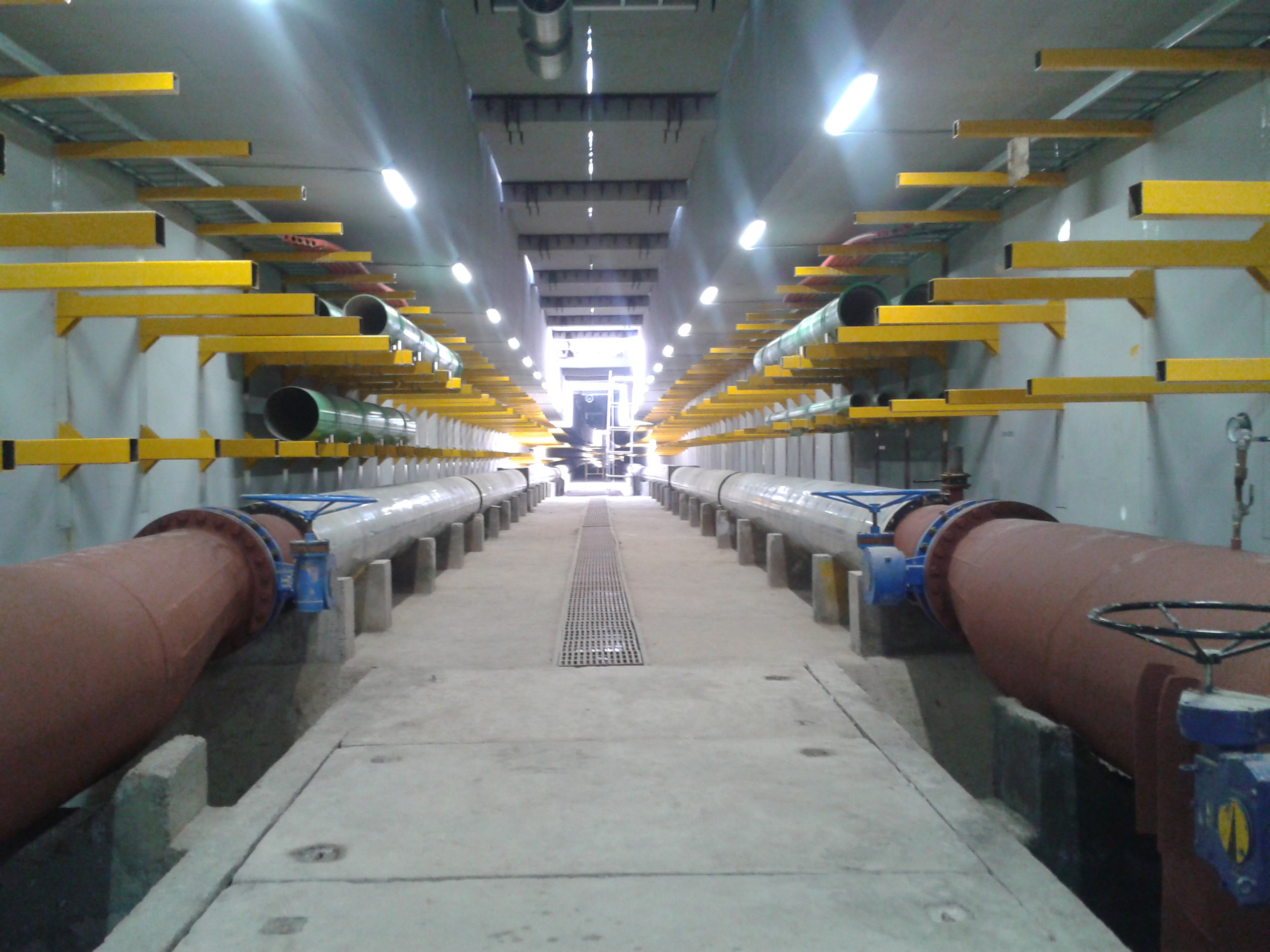
Utility Tunnel at GIFT City

Major construction events in GIFT City, Gujarat, India:

Timeline

2007:

- The Gujarat International Finance Tec-City (GIFT City) project is announced by the Government of Gujarat as an ambitious plan to develop a world-class financial and business district in Gujarat.
- Construction of GIFT City begins.

2008:

- Land acquisition for the GIFT City project begins. The government acquires about 359 hectares (886 acres) of land near Gandhinagar, the capital of Gujarat.
- The project receives approval from the Union cabinet, which marks the formal beginning of the project.

2009:

- GIFT SEZ area is notified.

2010:

- Construction begins on the first phase of the GIFT City project, which includes the development of basic infrastructure such as roads, water supply, drainage, and sewage systems.
- The first tower, called GIFT One, is inaugurated. The 29-storey building is built by the IL&FS (Infrastructure Leasing & Financial Services) group and serves as the headquarters for many financial companies.

2012:

- The first phase of the GIFT City project is completed, which includes the development of basic infrastructure and the construction of the GIFT One tower.
- GIFT City is formally inaugurated by then-Prime Minister of India, Dr. Manmohan Singh.
- GIFT City's first operational bank, Bank of Baroda, begins its operations.

2013:

- Construction begins on the second phase of the GIFT City project, which includes the development of more office buildings, residential apartments, and social infrastructure such as schools, hospitals, and retail spaces.
- The GIFT SEZ (Special economic zone) is notified by the government, which allows companies operating within the zone to enjoy tax and other benefits.
- GIFT City's first IFSC tower, GIFT One Tower A, is inaugurated.

2014:

- GIFT City is selected as a smart city under the Smart Cities Mission of the Government of India.

2015:

- The second phase of the GIFT City project is completed, which includes the development of more office buildings, residential apartments, and social infrastructure.
- The first IFSC (International Financial Services Centre) tower, called GIFT Two, is inaugurated. The 28-storey building is built by the IL&FS group and serves as the hub for international financial services companies.
- Construction of GIFT City's first data centre, owned by Netmagic, is completed.

2016:

- GIFT City's first international exchange, India International Exchange, starts operations.

2017:

- Construction begins on the third phase of the GIFT City project, which includes the development of more office buildings, residential apartments, and social infrastructure such as parks and open spaces.
- The GIFT SEZ is granted formal approval by the government, which enables companies operating within the zone to enjoy more benefits and incentives.

2019:

- The third phase of the GIFT City project is completed, which includes the development of more office buildings, residential apartments, and social infrastructure.
- The second IFSC tower, called GIFT Three, is inaugurated. The 30-storey building is built by the IL&FS group and serves as a hub for international financial services companies.

2021:

- Construction begins on the fourth and final phase of the GIFT City project, which includes the development of a retail and entertainment zone, a convention centre, and residential towers.
- The GIFT City project is awarded the "Smart City of the Year" award by the National Institute of Urban Affairs, which recognizes the city's innovative use of technology, sustainability, and urban planning.

2023:

- Google to open global fintech operation centre at GIFT City
- SGX Nifty was renamed as GIFT Nifty and started its trading operation from Gift City from the date 3 July 2023. It is a collaboration of Singapore Exchange and NSE India.

2024:

- TBD

2025:

- Coventry University has received in-principle approval to open a campus in GIFT City, expected to start academic sessions in 2026.
- Cognizant launched a 600-employee TechFin Centre in GIFT City, serving as a hub for BFSI sector technology solutions for global clients.
- S&P Global Ratings Singapore PTE becomes 1st foreign credit rating agency to set up base in GIFT City.
- Founder and CEO of TNBG Capital Advisors writes about how GIFT City is a gateway for global funds.
- Direct equity listing began in GIFT City with XED Executive Development Ltd filing the first DRHP with NSE-IX and India INX.
- Highlighting social life at GIFT City. Navratri celebrations that have been hosted by GIFT City for years and how it has been in spotlight for all artists and players alike Gujarat International Finance Tec-City (Gift City) is positioning itself as India's gateway to global finance, with the potential to unlock a USD 500 billion opportunity, senior regulators and bank executives said at the second Gift International Banking Forum (GIBF) 2025.
- XED, a global education technology (edtech) firm focused on executive programmes with leading universities, is preparing to raise $12 million through an initial public offering (IPO) at the International Financial Services Centre (IFSC) in Gujarat International Finance Tec-City (GIFT City).
- Tata Asset Management opened its branch in International Financial Services Centre (IFSC) in September 2025 and said it is exploring opportunities to relocate $1.6 billion of its offshore funds from Mauritius and Luxembourg to GIFT City in Gujarat

=== Consultants ===
- Owner – The Amazing
- Design and Architecture – East China Architectural Design & Research Institute (ECADI) and Fairwood Consultants India
- Construction – IL&FS, AECOM India, L&T Infrastructure Engineering, CBRE India
- ICT Advisory Services – British Telecom
- Market Demand Assessment – McKinsey & Company
- Talent Demand Assessment – Hewitt Associates
- Environmental Assessment – IL&FS Ecosmart Ltd
- Process Management – IL&FS Infrastructure Development Corporation Ltd
- Power Management – ABB Group
- Ernst & Young – Advisory services to various aspects of GIFT City, such as legal and regulatory compliance, tax planning, and risk management.
- KPMG – provides a consulting services to GIFT City for financial services, real estate, and infrastructure, which can be beneficial for clients operating in GIFT City.
- Deloitte – provides a tax planning, regulatory compliance, and risk management services to GIFT City.
- Grant Thornton – They offer a range of services, including accounting, tax, and advisory services, which can be beneficial for client

=== Status ===
As part of Phase-I development, around 780,000 square metres (8.4×10^{6} sq ft) of built-up area has already been allotted from the 1,200,000 square metres (13×10^{6} sq ft) available for commercial, residential and social use. On 11 September 2019, Tapan Ray, EX-managing director and Group CEO of GIFT City, said the city had attracted around ₹110 million (equivalent to ₹150 million or US$1.5 million in 2026) of investment.

== Divisions ==
GIFT City Divisions

Zones	Area
SEZ – PA	61.1829 ha (151.186 acres)
SEZ – N PA	44.2557 ha (109.358 acres)
TOTAL (SEZ)	105.4386 ha (260.544 acres)
DTA	252.93 ha (625.0 acres)
GRAND TOTAL	358.3686 ha (885.548 acres)

The total area for the development of GIFT is 359 hectares (886 acres) out of which the SEZ (Special Economic Zone) constitutes 106 hectares (261 acres). The project area under development can hence be classified under the SEZ area and the non-SEZ area (also known as the Domestic Tariff area or the DTA).

As of June 2025, GIFT City had 939 registered entities. The hub currently houses 47 insurance firms and 272 funds, with more than 100 foreign companies, half of which joined in the last year.

The state level approval has been received for both the airport link and the internal extension at GIFT City and are now awaiting the Centre's nod. The metro extension inside GIFT City will cover around 7 km. It will be linked to the current GNLU-GIFT City metro line.

Protection of Interest in Aircraft Objects Bill passed in Parliament this year which granted legal authority to the Cape Town Convention in India. Modi noted during his address that the new Act opens fresh opportunities for global aircraft leasing companies in India. He also pointed to the incentives offered at Gift City, stating that these measures have made India an attractive destination for aircraft leasing.

== Tax benefits ==
GIFT City, through its International Financial Services Centre (IFSC), provides several tax benefits aimed at luring both domestic and international investments. These incentives include exemptions from certain taxes for companies under the new tax regime, tax holidays for specific sectors, and GST-free services for IFSC SEZ units. Further perks include various state subsidies and tax exemptions for exchanges established under the IFSC.

== Liquor Policy in GIFT City ==
In December 2023, the Government of Gujarat authorized the controlled consumption of liquor within Gujarat International Finance Tec-City (GIFT City). This policy permits liquor to be served in restaurants, hotels, and clubs within GIFT City, but only to its permanent employees and their authorized visitors, as sanctioned by the respective companies' human resources departments. The sale of liquor bottles remains prohibited.

== Administration ==
=== Gujarat International Finance Tec-City Company Limited ===
The Government of Gujarat formed "Gujarat International Finance Tec-City Company Limited" (GIFTCL) to develop and implement GIFT City through its venture Gujarat Urban Development Company Limited (GUDCL). GIFT City is an 359-hectare (886-acre) integrated project that creates 62 million square feet of built-up area, including 67% commercial space, 22% residential space and 11% community space.

=== GIFT Managing Bodies ===
For the purpose of implementation of the SEZ, GIFT Company Limited has set up an SPV (Special Purpose Vehicle) (100% subsidiary of GIFTCL) namely GIFT SEZ Ltd, designated as the developer organization of the SEZ. GIFTCL has also set up 5 subsidiary companies for the implementation of specialized infrastructure including Power, Water, ICT (Information & Communication Technology), District Cooling and solid waste management.

- Gift Power Company Limited
- Gift Waste Management Services Limited
- Gift Water Infrastructure Limited
- Gift ICT Services Limited
- Gift Collective Investment Management Company Limited
- Gift SEZ Limited

== Critical assessment ==
=== Employment, investment, and occupancy shortfalls ===
The city's early performance fell short of its original ambitions. Promoters had projected over one million jobs within a decade of launch, but by May 2019, about 8 years after construction began, only about 9,000 jobs had materialised, and only about 3 million of the planned 62 million square feet had been built. Officials and analysts cited the 2008 global financial crisis, the absence of a clear regulatory framework till 2014, and the financial difficulties faced by IL&FS as contributing factors. A professor at the Indian Institute of Management described the project as "impractical" because of location and skill availability. However, in recent years, the city has grown substantially faster.

=== Land acquisition and compensation disputes ===
Development of GIFT city has led to legal disputes with local farmers. In March 2019, the Gujarat High Court ordered the state government to recalculate compensation for dozens of farmers, finding that the legally required compensation had never been paid.

=== "Ghost city" and social infrastructure ===
Singapore's High Commissioner to India, Simon Wong, described the GIFT city as "quite a ghost town after working hours" since only limited amenities remain available. By late 2023, the city hosted only one five-star hotel and a few restaurants, and only one residential project had been completed.

=== Tax-haven characterisation ===
The tax concessions given to businesses in the city have drawn comparisons to offshore tax-havens, such as Mauritius and Cayman Islands, as it has significant tax-haven characteristics. Others have argued that the city is not a tax shelter, but an example of tax architecture designed to attract investments and given stringent compliance requirements.

== See also ==
- Diamond Research and Mercantile City
- Dholera
