= GIFT International Financial Services Centre =

International Financial Services Centre in GIFT City

- Industry: Banking, financial services, insurance, wealth & asset management, brokerage & capital markets, professional service providers, corporate offices and retailers
- Founded: 11 January 2011; 15 years ago (foundation stone laid); 10 April 2015; 11 years ago (inaugurated)
- Headquarters: GIFT City, India
- Key people: Ajay Pandey (President); Ravi Parthasarathy (Governing Council Chairman); Tapan Ray ( CEO); Sudhir Mankad (Chairman)
- Website: www.giftifsc.in

The GIFT International Financial Services Centre (GIFT IFSC) is a financial centre and special economic zone in GIFT City, India. It was established in 2015 as a financial hub to provide world-class infrastructure and services for financial institutions and companies operating in areas such as banking, insurance, capital markets, and asset management. GIFT IFSC is regulated by the International Financial Services Centres Authority, an independent regulator exclusive to the zone.

== History ==
GIFT International Finance Services Centre (GIFT IFSC) is a special economic zone (SEZ) located in the Indian state of Gujarat, which was set up to promote international financial services.

It was established in the year 2007 by the Government of Gujarat. The GIFT project was first proposed in the year 2007, when the then Chief Minister of Gujarat, Narendra Modi, announced the establishment of an international financial services centre in Gujarat. The project was initiated with the aim of creating a world-class financial hub that could compete with the likes of London, New York, and Hong Kong.

The foundation stone for the GIFT project was laid on 28 January 2011, by the then Finance Minister of India, Pranab Mukherjee, and the then Chief Minister of Gujarat, Narendra Modi. The project was launched with an initial investment of ₹78 billion (equivalent to ₹160 billion or US$1.7 billion in 2023).

The first phase of the GIFT project was completed in the year 2017, with the construction of 10 buildings, including two iconic towers – GIFT One and GIFT Two. GIFT One is a 28-storey tower, while GIFT Two is a 29-storey tower. These towers are the tallest buildings in Gujarat, with a height of 122 meters.

The GIFT project has been developed as a special economic zone (SEZ) under the SEZ Act, 2005. It is spread over an area of 359 hectares (886 acres) and has been designed as a self-contained city with state-of-the-art infrastructure, including a dedicated power plant, water treatment plant, and an underground utility tunnel.

=== Chronology ===
Timeline
- In 2007, The Government of Gujarat announces plans to develop an international financial services centre in the state.
- In 2009, The Gujarat International Finance Tec-City Company Limited (GIFTCL) is incorporated to develop GIFT City as a global financial hub.
- In 2011, GIFT IFSC is formally launched by Chief Minister of Gujarat, Narendra Modi.
- In 2012, the first tower, GIFT One, is completed and occupied by companies such as Oracle, Ernst & Young, and IDFC Bank.
- In 2013, the Government of India grants GIFT City the status of a Special Economic Zone (SEZ) for International Financial Services.
- In 2015, the Reserve Bank of India (RBI) grants permission to operate an International Financial Services Centre (IFSC) within GIFT IFSC.
- In April 2015, GIFT IFSC was inaugurated by the Prime Minister of India, Shri Narendra Modi. The first phase of the project was completed with the construction of the GIFT Tower, which is 28 stories high.
- In 2016, GIFT IFSC hosts its first international conference, Vibrant Saurashtra Expo and Summit, to showcase its potential as a global financial hub.
- In September 2016, GIFT IFSC received its first banking license from the Reserve Bank of India. YES Bank became the first bank to set up its IFSC banking unit at GIFT IFSC.
- In 2017, GIFT IFSC launches India's first international exchange, India INX, which offers trading in equities, commodities, and currencies.
- In April 2017, the National Stock Exchange of India (NSE) started its operations at GIFT IFSC with the launch of NSE IFSC Ltd. The exchange provides trading in equities, currencies, and derivatives.
- In July 2017, GIFT IFSC signed a memorandum of understanding with Abu Dhabi Global Market (ADGM) to promote cross-border investment and enhance regulatory cooperation between the two financial centres.
- In August 2017, the Securities and Exchange Board of India (SEBI) issued guidelines for the listing of Real Estate Investment Trusts (REITs) and Infrastructure Investment Trusts (InvITs) on the stock exchanges located in IFSCs. GIFT IFSC was the first IFSC to receive such guidelines.
- In January 2018, the Gujarat International Finance Tec-City (GIFT City) won the 'Global Financial Centre Award 2018' at the London-based City of London Global Financial Centres Index (GFCI) awards ceremony.
- In 2018, GIFT ICSC launches its first IFSC Banking Unit (IBU), allowing foreign banks to operate within GIFT City with the same regulatory framework as their offshore branches.
- In April 2018, the Bombay Stock Exchange (BSE) launched its international exchange, INX, at GIFT IFSC. INX provides trading in commodities, equity derivatives, and currency derivatives.
- In October 2018, the first international arbitration centre was inaugurated at GIFT IFSC. The centre provides institutional arbitration services and facilities for resolving commercial disputes.
- In 2019, The Securities and Exchange Board of India (SEBI) allows Alternative Investment Funds (AIFs) to operate from GIFT IFSC.
- In September 2019, the Insurance Regulatory and Development Authority of India (IRDAI) issued guidelines for the establishment of insurance offices in IFSCs. GIFT IFSC was one of the IFSCs to receive such guidelines.
- In 2020, GIFT IFSC bags 10th place in Financial Industry and top rank in emerging financial centres in Global Financial Centres Index .
- In October 2020, GIFT IFSC signed a memorandum of understanding with the London Stock Exchange Group (LSEG) to create a dual listing route for Masala bonds, which are rupee-denominated bonds issued overseas.
- In 2022, IBM opens Software lab in GIFT IFSC. India International Bullion Exchange was inaugurated in GIFT IFSC.

== GIFT IFSC Structure ==
Key executives and members of the board of directors at the GIFT IFSC:

1. CEO: Ajay Pandey is the Managing Director & Group CEO of GIFT City. He is responsible for overseeing the development and management of the GIFT IFSC. Prior to joining GIFT City, Pandey served in various leadership roles in the financial services industry, including as the CEO of IDFC Financial Holding Company Ltd.
2. President: Tapan Ray is the executive director at GIFT City and also serves as the President of GIFT IFSC. Ray has extensive experience in the banking and financial services sector, having previously served as the Secretary for the Ministry of Corporate Affairs and as a Director on the Central Board of the Reserve Bank of India.
3. Governor: Roopa Deepak Rawat is the current Governor of GIFT IFSC. Rawat has a background in law and has previously worked as an advocate in various Indian courts, as well as serving as a legal advisor to several state governments.
4. Chairman: Sudhir Mankad is the Chairman of GIFT City. Mankad has had a long and distinguished career in the Indian civil service, having served as the Chief Secretary of the Government of Gujarat and as the Principal Secretary to the Prime Minister of India.
5. Board of Directors: The Board of Directors of GIFT IFSC includes eminent industry leaders and government officials. Some of the current members of the Board of Directors are:
  1. Ajay Kumar Tomer: Joint Secretary, Department of Economic Affairs, Ministry of Finance
  2. Amitabh Chaudhry: CEO, Axis Bank
  3. Punit Shah: Executive Director, GIFT IFSC
  4. Jaijit Bhattacharya: President, Centre for Digital Economy Policy Research
  5. Jayen Shah: Partner, Ernst & Young LLP
  6. Rajeshwar Burla: Managing Director & Head of Financial Institutions Group, Asia Pacific, Standard Chartered
  7. Uday Kotak: Managing Director & CEO, Kotak Mahindra Bank

== See also ==
- Dubai International Financial Centre
- International Financial Services District
- International Financial Services Centre, Dublin
- Astana International Financial Centre
- International Financial Services Centres Authority
