= Department of Financial Studies =

University of Delhi, India

- Type: Public
- Established: 1987; 39 years ago
- Affiliations: University of Delhi, CFA Institute
- Dean: Dr. Sanjay Sehgal
- Location: (India) Delhi, Delhi, India
- Campus: Urban
- Website: www.mfc.edu

The Department of Financial Studies (DFS) is a department of the University of Delhi offering programs in finance. Tracing its roots in the Delhi School of Economics, the DFS was carved out of the Department of Commerce of the university in 1987 to provide training in the field of finance. The DFS is located at the South Campus of the university.

DFS was rated AA by TIME (the Triumphant Institute of Management Education), making it one of the top 30 business schools in India.

Eminent financial policy personalities of India including C. B. Bhave, Kamalesh Chandra Chakrabarty and M. Damodaran have served on its advisory board for the Master of Finance and Control course. The past deans of the department include some of the best known financial management educationists like Professors M. Y. Khan, C. P. Gupta and I. M. Pandey.

== Courses ==
The programmes offered by DFS are:

- MBA (finance) (erstwhile Master of Finance and Control)
- Doctoral programme

== International associations ==
DFS has collaborations with the following institutions:

- ESC-PAU, France
- Reims Management School, Reims Codex, France
- Institut national des telecommunications, Évry, France
- University of Leicester, England
- Akron University, US

== Admissions ==
The MBA (finance) programme has a total of 62 (24-general + 16-obc + 8-sc + 4-st + 6-ews + 2-cw II + 2 phc) seats. Admission is on the basis of the Common Admission Test conducted by the Indian Institutes of Management.

For research scholars, DFS accepts post‐doc research scholars from the colleges/university/industry in the fields of finance and accounting/control and related fields.
