= Mutual funds in India =

Mutual Funds of India

Modern portfolio theory suggests a diversified portfolio of shares and other asset classes (such as debt in corporate bonds, treasury bonds, or money market funds) will realise more predictable returns if there is prudent market regulation.

The first introduction of a mutual fund in India occurred in 1963, when the Government of India launched the Unit Trust of India (UTI). Mutual funds are broadly categorised into three segments: equity funds, hybrid funds, and debt funds.

== Structure ==
The structure of mutual funds is established as a three-tier fiduciary model, organized as a Public Trust under the Indian Trusts Act, 1882, and regulated by the Securities and Exchange Board of India (SEBI) under the SEBI (Mutual Funds) Regulations, 1996. This hierarchy is designed to ensure a clear separation between the ownership of assets and their management, thereby protecting investor interests. The core of the structure consists of three primary entities: Sponsors, Trustees and Asset Management Company (AMC). The Sponsors are the promoters who establish the mutual fund trust and contribute at least 40% of the net worth of the AMC. The Trustees are the guardians of the fund who hold the assets "in trust" for the benefit of the unit-holders. They are responsible for monitoring the fund's compliance with SEBI regulations. The AMC is the investment management company appointed by the trustees to manage the pooled capital and execute investment strategies through professional fund managers.

This framework is supported by essential intermediaries, including Custodians, who are responsible for the physical and electronic safekeeping of the fund's securities, and Registrars and Transfer Agents (RTAs), who manage investor transactions and record-keeping.

== Mutual fund statistics ==
- The total assets under management (AUM) of the Indian mutual fund industry as of April 30, 2026, stood at ₹87.08 trillion (approximately US$903 billion). This is a significant milestone, marking a near ten-fold increase compared to the ₹8.26 trillion recorded in December 2013. The industry now serves 27.53 crore (275.3 million) investor folios, reflecting the growing reach of mutual funds across Indian households. SIP contributions touched a record ₹32,087 crore in March 2026, underscoring sustained retail participation even amid equity market volatility.

The total assets under management (AUM) of the Indian mutual fund industry as of September 30, 2025, stood at a staggering ₹77.14 trillion (equivalent to ₹82 trillion or US$850 billion in 2026). This is a significant milestone, marking over a nine-fold increase compared to the ₹8.26 trillion (equivalent to ₹8.8 trillion or US$91 billion in 2026) recorded in December 2013.

- According to SEBI, during FY 2022–23, 73% of mutual fund units were redeemed within 2 years of investment. Only investments in 3% of the units continued for more than 5 years.
- According to the Reserve Bank of India report, mutual funds attracted 6% of household savings in FY2023 and less than 1% went into direct equities. Almost 95% of household savings in India park their money in bank deposits, including fixed deposit, provident fund, PPF, life insurance, and various small savings schemes.
- According to the S&P SPIVA Report FY2022, over a 10-year period, approximate 68% of the large-cap actively managed funds failed to beat their respective benchmarks, and over 50% failed to beat their benchmarks in the mid- and small-cap segments. Within the ELSS funds category, over 60% failed to beat their respective benchmarks over 10 year period. Globally, over long periods of time, passively managed funds consistently outperform actively managed funds.

== Mutual fund category breakup ==
- AUM of Equity funds – ₹20.33 lakh crore (US$210 billion) (November 2023)
- AUM of Hybrid funds – ₹6.90 lakh crore (US$72 billion) (January 2024)
- AUM of Debt funds – ₹11.97 trillion (US$120 billion) (March 2020)

== Controversies ==
=== List of Mutual fund companies/schemes bankrupted, defaulted or closed ===
==== 2020 Franklin Templeton Mutual Fund fiasco ====
In April 2020, Franklin Templeton India unexpectedly wound up six credit funds with assets of close to $4 billion, citing a lack of liquidity amid the coronavirus pandemic. These funds had large exposure to higher-yielding, lower-rated credit securities. The Securities and Exchange Board of India (SEBI) conducted a probe into this sudden closure and found “serious lapses and violations”. As a result, in June 2021, SEBI barred Franklin Templeton Mutual Fund from launching any new debt schemes for two years. The regulator also ordered the fund house to refund investment and advisory fees, along with interest, of more than 5 billion rupees, and fined the global giant another 50 million rupees.

Franklin Templeton said it strongly disagreed with the SEBI’s order and planned to appeal against it. The decision to wind up the schemes “was taken with the sole objective of preserving value for unitholders”, a spokesperson said. However, the closure of these funds sparked panic withdrawals from other Franklin Templeton schemes as well as credit funds of other asset managers, leading to a storm on social media and court cases by distraught investors.

==== Reliance Mutual Fund ====
In 2019, the debt schemes of Reliance Mutual Fund faced a liquidity crisis due to their exposure to troubled companies like Dewan Housing Finance Corporation (DHFL). This led to severe redemptions and forced asset sales, which significantly affected investors.

==== IL&FS crisis and impact ====
The IL&FS crisis in 2018 had a significant impact on the mutual fund industry, including those managed by IDBI Mutual Fund. The defaults by IL&FS led to a series of downgrades and defaults on its debt obligations and inter-corporate deposits1. This situation caused considerable distress in the financial markets and led to significant markdowns in the Net Asset Values (NAVs) of the affected mutual fund schemes, resulting in losses to investors.

The defaults by Infrastructure Leasing & Financial Services (IL&FS) triggered a liquidity crisis, making it difficult for mutual funds to meet redemption demands without selling assets at distressed prices. This event heightened concerns about credit risk, leading to widespread downgrades of IL&FS and other non-banking financial companies (NBFCs). Consequently, the net asset values (NAVs) of mutual funds holding these securities were adversely affected, reflecting the increased credit risk and decreased market confidence.

Investor confidence in debt mutual funds, particularly those with high exposure to NBFCs and infrastructure debt, was severely undermined. This led to significant outflows as investors moved towards safer and more liquid investment options. In response, the Securities and Exchange Board of India (SEBI) introduced stricter regulations on sectoral exposure, single issuer limits, and the quality of collateral accepted in debt funds to enhance liquidity and reduce risks. Fund managers began focusing on higher-quality assets and improved risk management practices. The crisis underscored the need for better credit assessment and liquidity management, prompting regulatory reforms and a more cautious investment approach within the mutual fund industry.

==== Amtek Auto Impact ====
Several mutual funds, including those managed by JP Morgan Asset Management India, faced significant issues due to exposure to Amtek Auto, which defaulted on its debt in 2015. JP Morgan had to suspend redemptions and impose exit loads to manage the liquidity crisis.

==== Birla Sun Life Mutual Fund (Aditya Birla Sun Life Mutual Fund) ====
In 2018, Aditya Birla Sun Life Mutual Fund faced redemption pressures in some of its debt schemes due to exposure to entities like the Essel Group companies. The Economic Times reported that the Aditya Birla Sun Life Mutual Fund was the biggest investor in the Essel Group, with an exposure of Rs 2,936 crore spread across 28 schemes1. This accounted for almost 37% of the total debt fund exposure to the Zee group, which is part of the Essel Group.

==== Dewan Housing Finance Corporation (DHFL) crisis and impact ====
The Dewan Housing Finance Corporation (DHFL) crisis had a profound impact on the Indian mutual fund industry. DHFL's defaults created a severe liquidity crunch, making it difficult for mutual funds to meet redemption pressures without selling assets at heavily discounted prices. This crisis raised significant concerns about the creditworthiness of housing finance companies (HFCs) and non-banking financial companies (NBFCs), leading to downgrades of DHFL's debt instruments and adversely affecting the net asset values (NAVs) of mutual funds holding these securities.

Investor confidence in debt mutual funds, especially those with high exposure to HFCs and NBFCs, was severely shaken, resulting in substantial outflows as investors sought safer investments. In response, the Securities and Exchange Board of India (SEBI) increased scrutiny and introduced tighter regulations on mutual funds' exposure to individual issuers and sectors to mitigate such risks in the future. Fund managers adjusted their portfolios by shifting towards higher-quality and more liquid assets, reducing exposure to high-risk debt instruments. The crisis underscored the importance of credit quality and liquidity management, prompting regulatory reforms and a more cautious approach within the mutual fund industry.

==== 2001 UTI Mutual Fund (Unit Trust of India) fiasco ====
The Unit Trust of India (UTI) faced a significant crisis in 2001, which was primarily due to large-scale redemption pressures and mismanagement, particularly in its flagship scheme, US-6412. The crisis was exacerbated by the Ketan Parekh scam, which caused a sharp decline in stock prices, leading to mutual funds, including UTI’s schemes, suffering severe consequences.

The government intervened to protect investors and restructured UTI. This restructuring led to the bifurcation of UTI into two separate entities in 2003: the UTI Mutual Fund (now managed by the UTI Trustee Company Pvt. Ltd.) and the Specified Undertaking of the Unit Trust of India (SUUTI), which took over the assets and liabilities of the erstwhile UTI12. The government’s intervention included a bailout package to stabilize the situation and ensure the protection of investors’ interests.

==== DHFL Pramerica Mutual Fund ====
Dewan Housing Finance Corporation Limited (DHFL) defaulted on its debt obligations in 2019. This event led to significant governance concerns and defaults by DHFL in meeting various payment obligations, prompting the Reserve Bank of India to supersede the Board of Directors of DHFL1. The default affected several mutual funds, including those managed by BNP Paribas Asset Management India Private Limited, which had to mark down the value of their investments in DHFL’s securities.

The crisis deepened with rating downgrades and write-offs by mutual funds, which had a cumulative exposure of ₹5,336 crore to securities issued by DHFL3. As a result, there was a severe liquidity issue and a drop in the Net Asset Values (NAVs) of the mutual funds, impacting investors’ returns. DHFL Pramerica Mutual Fund, which was a joint venture between DHFL and Pramerica Financial, Inc., also faced challenges due to the exposure to DHFL’s debt instruments.

==== Yes Mutual Fund ====
In 2019, Yes Bank faced severe financial stress and was eventually placed under a moratorium by the Reserve Bank of India (RBI) in March 2020. This led to significant challenges for Yes Mutual Fund, particularly its debt schemes that had exposure to Yes Bank’s securities. The crisis necessitated write-downs and affected investor confidence. Around 32 mutual fund schemes had exposure to Yes Bank’s downgraded debt papers, with a total exposure amounting to approximately ₹2,848 crore. The crisis led to write-downs of these securities and impacted the net asset values (NAVs) of the mutual funds involved, which in turn affected investor confidence.

==== Kotak Mutual Fund ====
In 2019, Kotak Mutual Fund did face challenges with its Fixed Maturity Plans (FMPs) due to exposure to debt securities of companies like the Essel Group. The fund house was unable to redeem investments from these companies, which led to delays and partial rollovers of the FMPs. This situation affected the investors’ expected returns. Consequently, the Securities and Exchange Board of India (SEBI) barred Kotak from launching new FMPs for six months and imposed a fine for failing to abide by regulatory requirements.

==== HDFC Mutual Fund ====
HDFC Mutual Fund did face a situation in 2018-2019 due to its exposure to companies like Essel Group and IL&FS. The credit events involving these companies led to significant mark-downs in the Net Asset Values (NAVs) of some of HDFC Mutual Fund’s debt schemes. This situation resulted in investor concerns and redemption pressures.

To elaborate, the IL&FS crisis was one of the biggest financial crises in India, with the company defaulting on several of its obligations due to a cash shortfall. The debt involved was about Rs 1 lakh crore. Similarly, Essel Group companies were grappling with debt woes, which put mutual funds, including HDFC, under redemption pressure. However, HDFC Mutual Fund later recovered the entire investment made in the non-convertible debentures issued by Essel Group companies.

==== Sahara Mutual Fund ====
SEBI conducted an examination to determine whether Sahara Mutual Fund, its Asset Management Company, and its trustees were ‘fit and proper’ as per regulatory standards. This was in light of a previous SEBI order from 2011 concerning two other Sahara entities, which were directed to refund money collected through Optionally Fully Convertible Debentures (OFCDs) to investors.

In 2015, SEBI ordered the winding up of Sahara Mutual Fund’s schemes due to non-compliance with regulatory requirements. The regulatory scrutiny and legal challenges indeed led to operational difficulties and affected investor confidence in the fund house.

== Market segment ==
Despite being available in the market, a recent report on Mutual Fund Investments in India published by research and analytics firm, Boston Analytics, suggests investors are holding back from putting their money into mutual funds due to their perceived high risk and a lack of information on how mutual funds work. There are 46 Mutual Funds as of June 2013. In 2019, asset under management (AUM) of the mutual fund industry rose by 13% to 24 trillion in 2018 by November The total assets under management (AUM) has surged by around 23.43% in 2023. The Assets base in January 2023 was Rs.40.70 lakh crores, which rose to Rs.50.24 lakh crore in Nov, 23.

== Asset management companies ==
Asset management companies (AMCs) are entities that manage mutual fund schemes on behalf of investors. Assets under management (AUM) is a financial term denoting the market value of all the funds being managed by a financial institution (a mutual fund, hedge fund, private equity firm, venture capital firm, or brokerage house) on behalf of its clients, investors, partners, depositors, etc. The following table lists mutual fund AMCs in India, along with their assets under management (AUM) and number of funds.

Asset management company	Assets under management (₹ crore)	Number of funds	Founded
Abakkus Mutual Fund	3,129	3	2025
Aditya Birla Sun Life Mutual Fund	4,40,740	118	1995
Angel One Mutual Fund	452	11	2023
Axis Mutual Fund	3,67,901	92	2009
Bajaj Finserv Mutual Fund	30,627	24	2022
Bandhan Mutual Fund	1,97,287	79	2000
Bank of India Mutual Fund	14,171	24	2008
Baroda BNP Paribas Mutual Fund	55,007	48	1993
Canara Robeco Mutual Fund	1,17,483	27	1993
Capitalmind Mutual Fund	472	4	2025
Choice Mutual Fund	69	3	2008
DSP Mutual Fund	2,28,622	91	1996
Edelweiss Mutual Fund	1,89,707	71	2008
Franklin Templeton Mutual Fund	1,24,956	37	1996
Groww Mutual Fund	4,754	61	2008
HDFC Mutual Fund	9,52,867	109	2000
Helios Mutual Fund	9,401	8	2021
HSBC Mutual Fund	1,36,788	45	2002
ICICI Prudential Mutual Fund	11,64,160	144	1994
IL&FS Mutual Fund	911	5	2015
Invesco Mutual Fund	1,41,344	45	2005
ITI Mutual Fund	10,825	20	2008
Jio BlackRock Mutual Fund	16,712	14	2025
JM Financial Mutual Fund	13,219	16	1994
Kotak Mahindra Mutual Fund	5,99,283	122	1995
LIC Mutual Fund	47,207	43	1994
Mahindra Manulife Mutual Fund	33,153	27	2016
Mirae Asset Mutual Fund	2,27,884	94	2007
Motilal Oswal Mutual Fund	1,40,602	87	2009
Navi Mutual Fund	9,007	17	2009
Nippon India Mutual Fund	7,40,031	107	1995
NJ Mutual Fund	6,965	5	2006
Old Bridge Mutual Fund	2,566	3	2023
Parag Parikh Mutual Fund	1,52,328	7	2012
PGIM India Mutual Fund	26,401	25	2009
Quant Mutual Fund	88,363	29	1996
Quantum Mutual Fund	3,948	14	2006
Samco Mutual Fund	2,532	13	2020
SBI Mutual Fund	12,70,599	124	1992
Shriram Mutual Fund	1,255	10	1994
Sundaram Mutual Fund	74,954	40	1996
Tata Mutual Fund	2,30,220	67	1994
Taurus Mutual Fund	978	8	1994
The Wealth Company Mutual Fund	1,413	10	2019
Trust Mutual Fund	4,253	12	2018
UTI Mutual Fund	3,90,495	79	2003
Unifi Mutual Fund	1,440	3	2024
Union Mutual Fund	26,633	32	2010
WhiteOak Capital Mutual Fund	33,024	21	2017
Zerodha Mutual Fund	14,448	19	2022

== Mutual Fund Acquisitions ==
Seller	Acquired By	Year
Pioneer ITI MF	Franklin Templeton	2002
Zurich India AMC	HDFC MF	2003
Alliance Capital MF	Birla Sunlife	2005
Standard Chartered	IDFC	2008
AIG Global Investment Group MF	PineBridge MF	2011
Benchmark Mutual Fund	Goldman Sachs	2011
Fidelity	L&T Finance	2012
Morgan Stanley's MF	HDFC MF	2013
PineBridge MF	Kotak MF	2014
ING Mutual Fund	Birla Sunlife	2014
Daiwa AMC	SBI MF	2013
Goldman Sachs	Reliance MF	2015
Deutsche	Pramerica	2015
JP Morgan	Edelweiss	2016
Peerless	Essel	2017
Escorts	Quant	2018
Religare Invesco	Invesco AMC	2018
Reliance MF	Nippon India	2019
Principal	Sundaram	2021
Essel	Navi MF	2021
L&T Asset Management Company	HSBC Global Asset Management Company	2022
Yes Asset Management Company	WhiteOak Capital MF	2022
IDFC Asset Management Company	Bandhan Financial Holdings Limited	2023
India Bulls Asset Management Company	Groww MF	2023
IDBI Asset Management Company	LIC Nomura Mutual Fund Asset Management Company	2023

== See also ==
- Association of Mutual Funds of India
- Securities and Exchange Board of India (Mutual Funds) Regulations, 1996
- List of Indian exchange-traded funds
- Bombay Stock Exchange
- National Stock Exchange of India
