= Securities and Exchange Board of India (Mutual Funds) Regulations, 1996 =

Securities and Exchange Board Of India (Mutual Funds) Regulations, 1996 is a set of regulations in India that govern mutual funds. It is enforced by the Securities and Exchange Board of India (SEBI). The regulations have been primarily designed to protect the investors. This replace an older set of regulations from 1993. SEBI had been regulating the mutual fund market since 1991.

== Summary ==
All mutual funds must register as trusts under the Indian Trusts Act, 1882. The firm must set up a separate asset management company (AMC) to run mutual fund business. The net worth of the parent firm or AMC must be ₹50,000,000. Mutual funds can be penalised for violating norms. Mutual funds dealing exclusively with the money market must register with the Reserve Bank of India. In 1995, private firms were allowed to enter the money market in India and deal with treasury bills, commercial papers, certificates of deposit etc. These are called Money Market Mutual Funds (MMMFs).

All other mutual funds must register with the SEBI. Now, there is a self-regulation agency for mutual funds, Association of Mutual Funds of India (AMFI).

== See also ==
- Securities and Exchange Board of India (Alternative Investment Funds) Regulations, 2012
- Association of Mutual Funds of India
