= Zerodha =

Indian financial services company

Zerodha Broking Ltd
- Type: Private
- Industry: Financial services
- Founded: August 2010; 16 years ago
- Founders: Nithin Kamath; Nikhil Kamath
- Headquarters: Bengaluru, Karnataka, India
- Products: Kite; Coin; Console; Varsity
- Services: Equity trading; Derivatives trading; Currency trading; Commodity trading; Mutual funds
- Revenue: ▼₹8,847 crore (US$920 million) (FY25)
- Net income: ▼₹4,237 crore (US$440 million) (FY25)
- Owners: Kamath family (100%)
- Website: zerodha.com

Zerodha Broking Ltd is an Indian brokerage and financial services company, based in Bengaluru. It offers an online trading platform that facilitates institutional and retail trading of stocks, derivatives, currencies, commodities, mutual funds, and bonds. It is a member of the National Stock Exchange of India (NSE), Bombay Stock Exchange (BSE), and the Multi Commodity Exchange (MCX).

Zerodha was founded and bootstrapped by brothers Nithin and Nikhil Kamath. As of May 2024, it has 7.5 million active customers registered with the NSE, making it the second-largest stockbroker in India.

== History ==
Zerodha was founded in August 2010 by brothers Nithin Kamath and Nikhil Kamath as a discount brokerage firm. The name Zerodha was a combination of words for the company's ideals: zero and rodha, the Sanskrit word for 'barrier'. The company started with six employees and ₹2 crore in seed money drawn from Nithin Kamath's personal savings and contributions from a Singapore-based friend.

Kailash Nadh joined Zerodha in 2013 to start its technology team and has served as the company's chief technology officer since then, building its trading platforms in-house. In 2019, Zerodha became the largest retail stockbroker in India by active client base, overtaking ICICI Securities. It contributed up to 2% of daily retail volumes on Indian stock exchanges at the time.

In June 2020, it became a "unicorn" with a self-assigned valuation of around $1 billion based on an ESOP buyback. Zerodha had about 1.3 million customers in early 2020, which rose to nearly 10 million by the end of 2022. In 2020, Zerodha applied for a licence to set up an asset management company (AMC) in India and launched its fund house in 2023.

In November 2025, Zerodha invested in Tijori Finance, a Bengaluru-based market data and research platform. In 2026, Zerodha obtained merchant banking licence through its subsidiary Zerodha Corporate Advisors, enabling it to offer investment banking services such as managing public offerings.

== Products and subsidiaries ==
A fixed commission of up to ₹20 is applied to all equity trading and derivative transactions, regardless of its size. Equity delivery is commission-free. The company also offers commodity trading through its wholly owned subsidiary, Zerodha Commodities Pvt. Ltd.

=== Rainmatter ===
In 2014, Rainmatter was founded as an early-stage fund focused on financing start-ups in new technology and new product development. Some notable investments by Rainmatter are in startups such as Cred, Finception, Smallcase, and Sensibull. The company has also backed GoldenPi and WintWealth, which are bond purchasing platforms.

=== True Beacon ===
In 2019, Zerodha started True Beacon, an alternative investment fund (AIF) with a defensive investment strategy.

=== Zerodha Fund House ===
In October 2023, Zerodha launched Zerodha Fund House, an AMC, in partnership with Smallcase. It focused on index funds and had only direct plans which paid no commissions to distributors. In March 2024, the fund house had an AUM of ₹10 billion (US$100 million).

=== FLOSS Fund ===
On 15 October 2024, Zerodha announced the launch of FLOSS Fund dedicated to Free/Libre and Open Source projects globally. Zerodha committed to giving up to $1 million per year to support developers and communities that create and maintain such projects.

== Technical problems and interruptions ==
There have been multiple reports of technical issues, including glitches, system outages, and connectivity issues on Zerodha's Kite platform, especially on days with high market volatility and F&O expiry days.

In November 2020, Livemint reported that some Zerodha traders complained of being unable to access its Kite platform due to a technical issue. Several users took to Twitter to report a login issue. Zerodha, in an official statement, acknowledged the problem.

== Awards ==
- They were recognised with the award 'Retail Brokerage of the year 2018', by National Stock Exchange.
- Outlook Money recognised Zerodha with 'Retail Broker of the year' award in 2017.
- In 2017, they were also awarded the 'Young Entrepreneur of the Year (Startup) Award' by Ernst and Young.

== See also ==
- Angel One
- Robinhood Markets
- Securities and Exchange Board of India
