= Securities and Exchange Board of India (Alternative Investment Funds) Regulations, 2012 =

Indian regulations

Securities and Exchange Board of India (Alternative Investment Funds) Regulations, 2012 (also called AIF Regulations) are a set of regulations introduced by the Securities and Exchange Board of India (SEBI) in 2012, to regulate pooled investment funds in India, such as real estate, private equity, and hedge funds.

== Summary ==
These regulations apply to all pooled investment funds registered in India which received capital from Indian or foreign investors. These were made to regulate funds not covered by the SEBI (Mutual Funds) Regulations, 1996; the SEBI (Custodian of Securities) Regulations, 1996; or any other SEBI regulations. This was introduced to bring unregistered funds in India under the ambit of law. Before the introduction of this, many funds operating in India that could not be classified as domestic venture capital funds (VCF), foreign venture capital investors (FVCI), or foreign institutional investors (FII). After the introduction of these regulations in July 2012, 123 entities registered themselves by November 2014.

The Alternative Investment Funds (AIFs) have been categorised into three classes:

- Category I: These funds receive incentives from the government. These include social venture funds, infrastructure funds, venture capital funds, and SME funds.
- Category II: These funds are allowed to invest anywhere in any combination, but cannot take on debts, except for day-to-day operation purposes. These include private equity funds and debt funds.
- Category III: Funds that make short-term investments and then sell, like hedge funds, fall under this.

AIFs are usually marketed towards high-net-worth persons. The minimum investment from one person is ₹10,000,000. The minimum corpus of the funds is ₹200,000,000. At any time, not more than 1000 investors are allowed. The initial contribution of the fund manager or promoter should be 2.5% or ₹50,000,000, whichever is less (for categories 1 and 2) and 5% or ₹100,000,000 for Category 3 AIF

In the 2015 Union Budget of India, it was announced that foreign direct investment (FDI) would be allowed in AIFs. It was also announced that the tax liability will be shifted from the funds to the investors in Category I and Category II.

== See also ==
- Securities Laws (Amendment) Bill, 2014, a law introduced in 2014 to check fraudulent funds
