= Nikhil Kamath =

Indian businessman and Investor

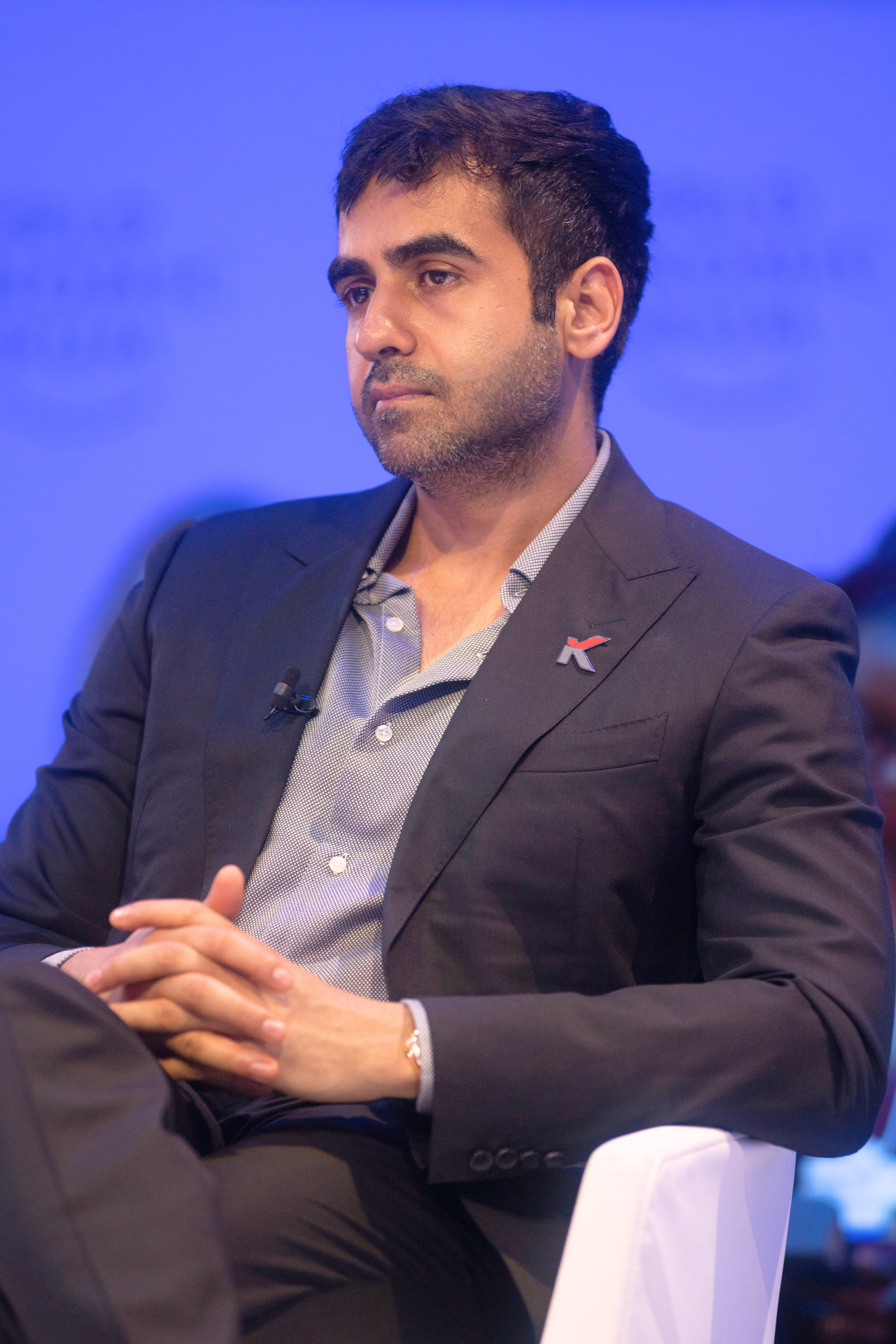
- Kamath in 2023
- Born: 5 September 1986 (age 40); Shimoga, Karnataka, India
- Occupations: Entrepreneur; Investor
- Organization(s): Zerodha; True Beacon; Gruhas
- Spouse: Amanda Puravankara (m. 2019; div. 2021)
- Relatives: Nithin Kamath (brother)

Nikhil Kamath (born 5 September 1986) is an Indian entrepreneur and investor. He is the co-founder of Zerodha, a retail stockbroker, and True Beacon, an asset management company. As of December 2025, Kamath is worth $3.3 billion, according to Forbes. He, along with his brother Nithin, is also part of Forbes' list of India's 100 Richest for 2024.

== Early life and education ==
Kamath was born on 5 September 1986, in Shimoga and was raised in Bengaluru, Karnataka. He was born into a Konkani speaking Hindu family. Kamath's father, Raghuram Kamath, was an executive at Canara Bank, while his mother, Revathi Kamath, had her own event management company that managed events at venues like Leela Palace and Windsor Manor. She also worked on landscaping projects for the Chinnaswamy Stadium, corporate clients, high-end resorts and hospitals. Revathi was a skilled veena player apart from her professional life. Kamath dropped out of school after 10th grade, and has no formal degree.

== Career ==
Kamath started his career with a job at a call centre while also engaging in equity trading on the side. In 2006, Kamath became a sub-broker and started his brokerage firm with his brother Nithin Kamath titled Kamath & Associates to manage high-net-worth individual portfolios in the public markets.

In 2010, Kamath co-founded the Indian brokerage and financial services company Zerodha along with his brother Nithin Kamath. Zerodha provides brokerage services for dealing in stocks, currencies, and commodities. Kamath introduced a discount brokerage model with Zerodha which reduces the commission charged for transactions.

Kamath also co-founded True Beacon in 2020, an asset management company that manages investments for ultra-high-net-worth individuals in Indian markets through privately pooled investment vehicles.

Gruhas is an investment firm co-founded in 2021 by Nikhil Kamath and Abhijeet Pai. The firm invests in early and growth-stage startups across sectors such as climate tech, consumer brands, senior care, sustainability, and PropTech. It operates two main funds—Gruhas Collective Consumer Fund (GCCF), which focuses on consumer brands, and the Earth Fund, launched in partnership with Brigade Group, which invests in sustainability and PropTech startups.

In March 2024, Kamath started hosting a podcast entitled "WTF is". As of December 2025, Kamath has hosted Indian Prime Minister Narendra Modi, Bill Gates, Ted Sarandos, Neal Mohan, Kiran Mazumdar-Shaw, Suniel Shetty, Ritesh Agarwal, Ronnie Screwvala, Bryan Johnson, Tanmay Bhat, AR Rahman and Elon Musk, among other public figures and entrepreneurs.

In June 2023, he committed to donating 50% of his wealth to charitable causes like climate change, education, and health care by signing The Giving Pledge.

Nikhil Kamath, along with Ankit Nagori and Prashanth Prakash, owns the Bengaluru franchise for Season 2 of the Global E-Cricket Premier League (GEPL).

Kamath has investments in consumer and sustainability-focused startups, including Licious, Nourish You, Pee Safe Subko & Ather. Kamath also has investments in InCred Holdings, RDC Concrete, GreenLine Mobility, Nazara Technology. In 2025, he bought 5% stake in D'yavol Spirits, founded by Shah Rukh and his son Aryan Khan.

In April 2024, Kamath launched WTFund, a non-dilutive grant fund for entrepreneurs aged 25 and under. In December 2025, Kamath, along with Kishore Biyani, launched The Foundery, a 90 day residential entrepreneurship programme based in Alibaug, Maharashtra.

== Personal life ==
In April 2019, Kamath married Amanda Puravankara, daughter of Puravankara Limited founder Ravi Puravankara, in a private ceremony in Florence, Italy. The couple separated less than a year later and got divorced in 2021.

== Controversies ==
In July 2024, Kamath was criticized for his glorification and positive portrayal of India's alcohol industry on his podcast. Hepatologist Cyriac Abby Philips noted that Kamath was spreading medically debunked false notions about alcohol consumption, writing that "no level of alcohol consumption is safe for human health."

In October 2024, Kamath purchased his first residential property, drawing criticism on social media due to his earlier public advocacy for renting over owning, which he said offered greater liquidity advantages. Some netizens criticised him, calling the move a "U-turn".

In June 2021, Kamath took part in an online charity chess simultaneous exhibition against five-time world champion Viswanathan Anand to raise funds for COVID-19 relief, organised by the Akshaya Patra Foundation and the All India Chess Federation. He was found to have used computer assistance to defeat Anand, prompting Chess.com to ban his account for a fair-play violation. Kamath apologised, calling his actions "silly" and saying he intended them "for fun and charity", drawing criticism from figures including Grandmaster Pentala Harikrishna. Anand said he "just played the position on the board" and later stated he had moved on. At Anand's request, Kamath's account was restored within 24 hours.
