= Ajay Seth =

Chairman of IRDAI

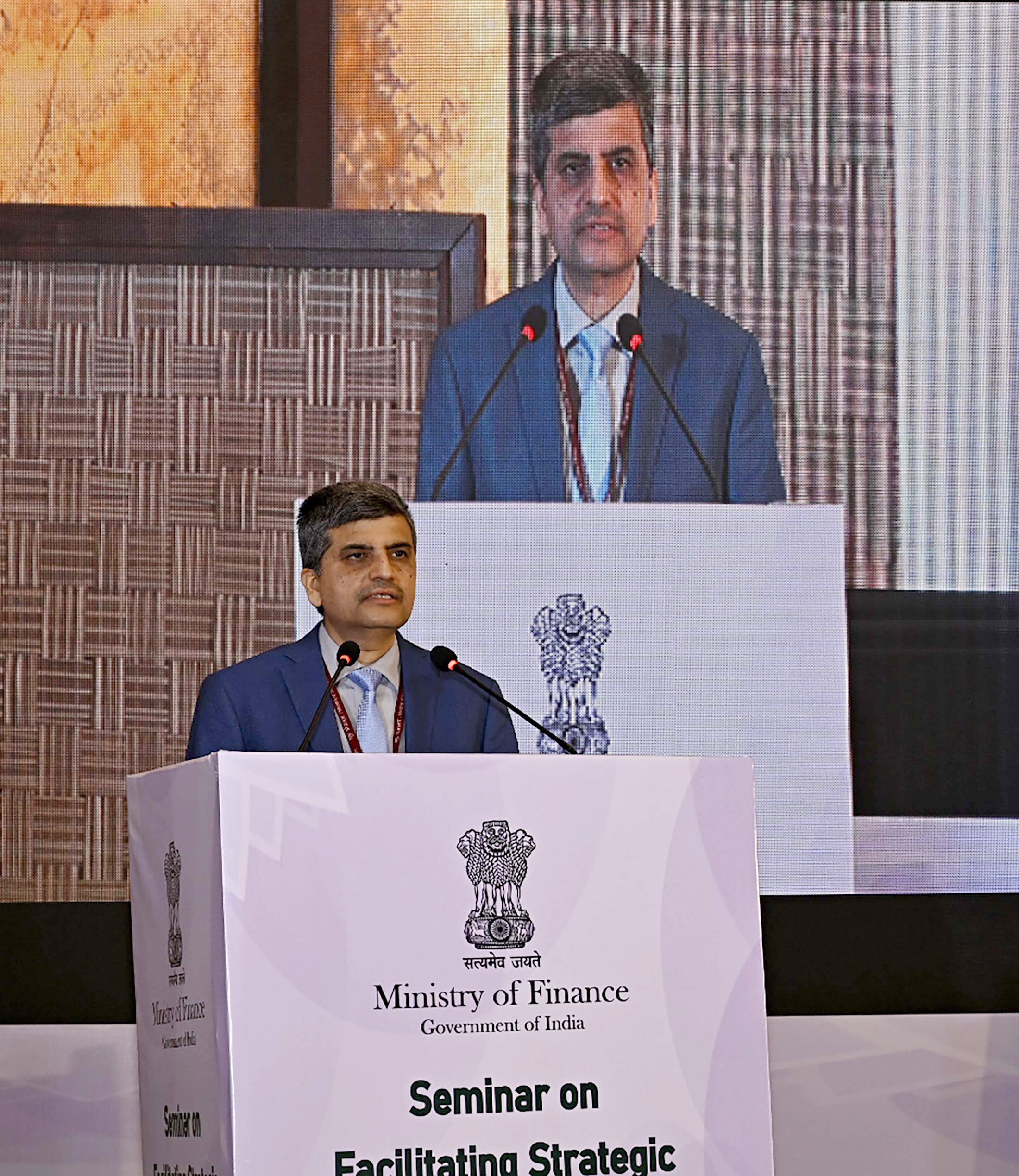

Chairman of Insurance Regulatory and Development Authority of India
- Incumbent
- Assumed office 1 September 2025
- Appointed by: Appointments Committee of the Cabinet
- Preceded by: Debasish Panda

Finance Secretary of India
- In office 24 March 2025 – 30 June 2025
- Appointed by: Appointments Committee of the Cabinet
- Preceded by: Tuhin Kanta Pandey
- Succeeded by: Vacant

Economic Affairs Secretary of India
- In office 16 April 2021 – 30 June 2025
- Appointed by: Appointments Committee of the Cabinet
- Preceded by: Tarun Bajaj
- Succeeded by: Anuradha Thakur

CEO of Bangalore Metro Rail Corporation Limited
- In office July 2018 – April 2021
- Appointed by: Government of Karnataka
- Succeeded by: Rakesh Singh

Personal details
- Born: Ajay Seth; 30 June 1965 (age 61) India
- Education: (B.Tech) IIT Roorkee (MBA) Ateneo de Manila University
- Occupation: Bureaucrat
- Awards: Prime Minister's Award for Excellence in Public Administration

Ajay Seth (born 30 June 1965) is a retired 1987 batch IAS officer from Karnataka cadre who is serving as the Chairman of Insurance Regulatory and Development Authority since September 2025.

== Early life and education ==
Ajay Seth was born on 30 June 1965 in India. He completed his B.Tech degree in mechanical engineering from IIT Roorkee and his MBA degree from Ateneo de Manila University in Philippines.

== Civil Service career ==
Seth has worked in various positions in the Government of Karnataka as Principal Secretary of Infrastructure Development, Urban Development and Planning department in Government of Karnataka.

Between 2000 and 2004 Seth was the Deputy Secretary in Department of Expenditure and in Department of Economic Affairs in Ministry of Finance Government of India. From 2004 to 2008 he was an advisor to the executive director at Asian Development Bank.

He then was the chief secretary in health and family welfare ministry and commissioner of Commercial Taxes in Government of Karnataka. As commissner of Commercial Tax department of Karnataka Government his tenure was known for transforming the Commercial Tax administration for which he got the Prime Minister's Award for Excellence in Public Enterprises in 2013.

In July 2018 he was appointed as the managing director of Bangalore Metro Railway Corporation Ltd where he worked until April 2021.

In April 2021, the Government of India appointed Ajay Seth as the Economic Affairs Secretary of India, his return to Central Government after a gap of 13 years.

In March 2025, the Government appointed Seth as the new Finance Secretary of India after the departure of Tuhin Kanta Pandey to take up the role as Chairman of SEBI.

After stepping down from both of his previous posts, Ajay Seth took over the office as the chairman of the Insurance Regulatory and Development Authority for a period of 3 years, starting on 1 September 2025.
