= Madhabi (given name) =

Madhabi is a feminine given name. Notable people with the name include:

- Madhabi Mukherjee (born 1940), Indian actress
- Madhabi Puri Buch (born 1965), Indian businesswoman
