= U. K. Sinha =

Former Chairman of Securities and Exchange Board of India

Upendra Kumar IAS (Retd.)
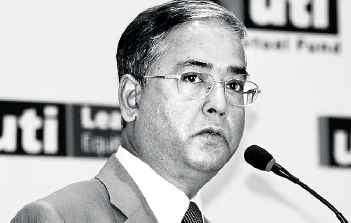

Chairperson of the Securities and Exchange Board of India
- In office 2011–2017
- Preceded by: Chandrasekhar Bhaskar Bhave
- Succeeded by: Ajay Tyagi

Personal details
- Education: Patna College; Patna University

Upendra Kumar Sinha (born 3 March 1952) is retired Indian Administrative Service officer belonging to the Bihar Cadre and was the former chairperson of Securities and Exchange Board of India serving for 6 years from 2011 to 2017. He was the Chairman and Managing Director (CMD) of the Unit Trust of India Asset Management Company (UTIAMC), commonly referred to as UTI Mutual Fund. On 27 March 2023, he was appointed an Independent Director of Adani-owned TV channel NDTV for a period of two years. He was also designated as the Non-Executive Chairperson of NDTV.

== Biography ==
He has drafted many acts and laws, although some of them never were passed. In 2002, Sinha drafted the SEBI amendment act. In 2004, he drafted the Securities Law Amendment Act, and the PFRDA Bill in 2005.

Since September 28, 2010, he has been chairman of the Association of Mutual Funds of India. Since February 2011, he has been the chairman of the Securities and Exchange Board of India.

=== Going Public ===
He published an autobiography titled Going Public on 5 January 2020.

Preceded by C. B. Bhave	Chairman & Managing Director of UTI AMC; 2005–2011	Succeeded by Ajay Tyagi
