= Nithin Kamath =

Indian businessman and investor

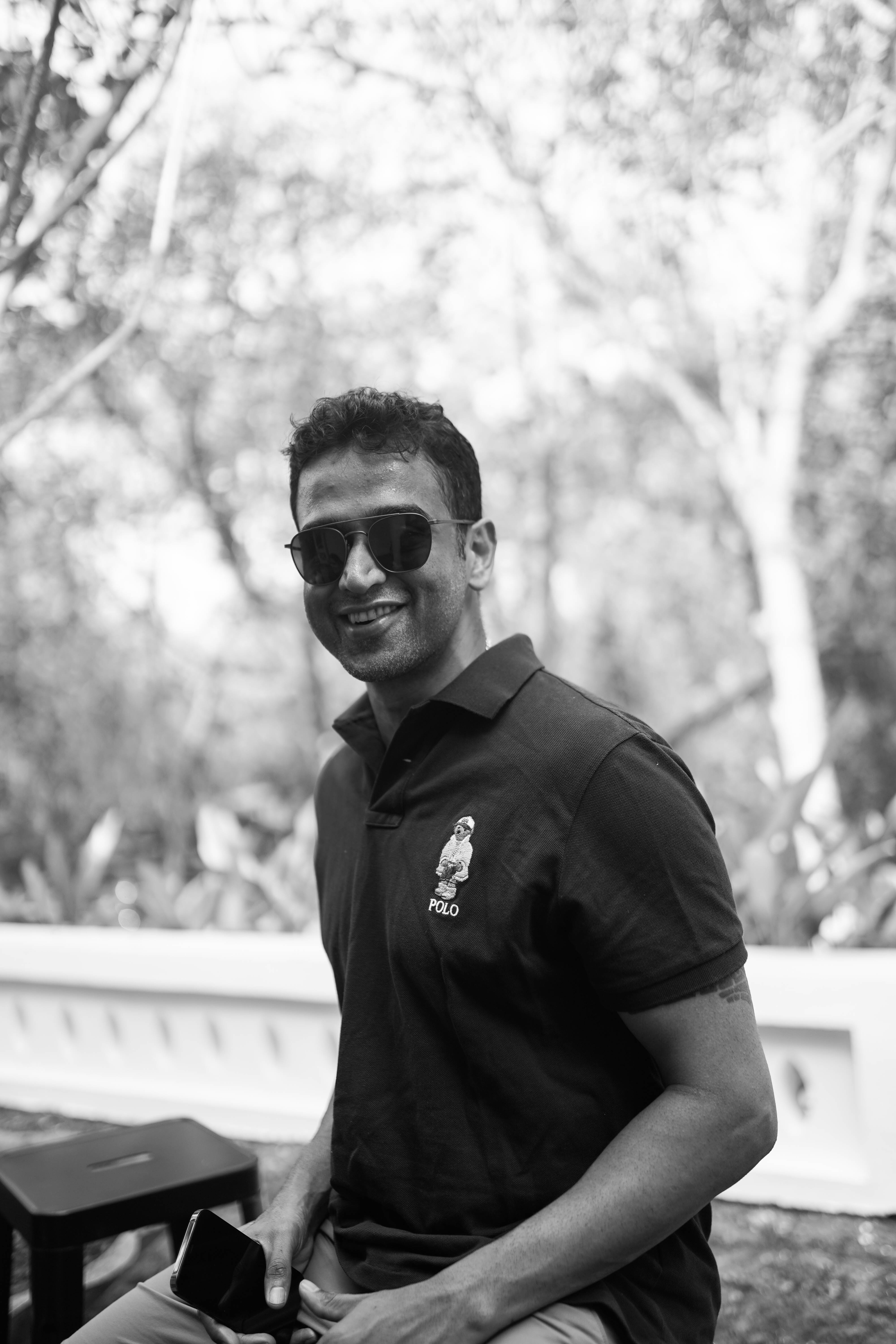
- Born: 5 October 1979 (age 46); Shimoga, Karnataka, India
- Education: Bangalore Institute of Technology
- Occupations: Entrepreneur; Investor
- Organization(s): Zerodha; True Beacon; Gruhas
- Relatives: Nikhil Kamath (brother)

Nithin Kamath (born 5 October 1979) is an Indian entrepreneur and the founder and chief executive officer (CEO) of Zerodha.

== Early life and education ==
Kamath was born in Shivamogga, Karnataka, to a Konkani family. His father, U. R. Kamath, worked as an executive at Canara Bank, and his mother, Revathi, was a veena teacher. He has a younger brother, Nikhil Kamath, who later became his business partner. The family relocated to Bangalore in 1996.

== Career ==
Kamath began trading in the stock market at the age of 17, initially managing his father's trading account. From January 1997 to January 2004, he worked as a self-employed proprietary trader. To supplement his income, he worked as a Senior Tele-sales Associate at a call centre from January 2001 to January 2004, trading during the day and working nights.

From January 2004 to January 2010, Kamath worked as a sub-broker for Kamath Associates, a franchise of Reliance Money, where he provided portfolio advisory services and engaged in proprietary trading.

== Founding of Zerodha ==
In 2010, Kamath co-founded Zerodha with his brother Nikhil Kamath. The company introduced a discount broking model in India, offering a flat fee of ₹20 per trade regardless of order size, in contrast to percentage-based fee structures used by traditional brokers.

The discount-broking model contributed to the firm's growth without significant spending on advertising or venture-capital funding. By 2020, Zerodha reported a self-assessed valuation of approximately US$1 billion.

== Other ventures ==
In 2015, Kamath founded Rainmatter, a fintech fund and incubator that supports startups working in financial technology. He also co-founded True Beacon, an investment management firm, together with Nikhil Kamath.

== Personal life ==
Nithin Kamath married Seema Patil in 2008. They have a son named Kiaan.

== Awards ==
- Top 10 Businessmen in India by The Economic Times (2016)
- Forbes India Leadership Award (2019)
- Startup of the Year (Bootstrap) by Economic Times (2016)
- Emerging Entrepreneur Award by Confederation of Indian Industry (CII) (2014)
