= National Institute of Securities Markets =

National Apex Body

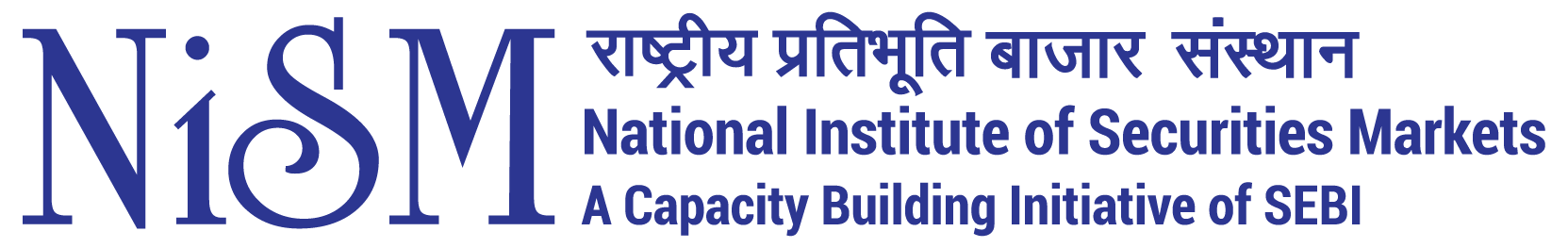

Agency overview
- Formed: 2006
- Type: National Apex Body
- Headquarters: Mumbai, Maharashtra
- Agency executive: Shri Sashi Krishnan
- Parent agency: Securities and Exchange Board of India, Ministry of Finance, Government of India
- Website: www.nism.ac.in

The National Institute of Securities Markets (NISM) is a public trust established in 2006 by the Securities and Exchange Board of India (SEBI) the regulator of the indian securities markets in India. It is under the ownership of the Securities and Exchange Board of India, working of Ministry of Finance in Government of India.

== History ==
In the Budget Speech of February 2006, P Chidambaram, the erstwhile Union Finance Minister, proposed to authorize the Securities and Exchange Board of India to set up a National Institute of Securities Markets for teaching and training intermediaries in securities markets and promoting research. Accordingly, NISM was established in 2006. NISM seeks to add to market quality through educational initiatives. It is an autonomous body governed by its Board of Governors. An International Advisory Council provides strategic guidance to NISM.

== Structure ==
The activities of NISM are carried out under six schools. These are as follows:

=== School for Securities Education (SSE) ===
The School for Securities Education (SSE) offers these flagship programs. The programs offered under SSE are

1. Post-Graduate Program in Investments & Securities Markets (PGPISM)
2. LL.M. in Investment and Securities Laws
3. Post Graduate Diploma in Portfolio Management, Investment Advisory and Research Analysis
4. Post Graduate Certificate in Data Science in Financial Markets
5. Post Graduate Certificate in Securities Markets

== NISM Certification Examinations List ==
- SEBI Investor Certification Examination
- NISM Series I: Currency Derivatives Certification Examination
- NISM Series II A: Registrars and Transfer Agents (Corporate) CertificationExamination
- NISM Series II B: Registrars and Transfer Agents (Mutual Fund) Certification Examination
- NISM Series-III-A: Securities Intermediaries Compliance (Non-Fund) Certification Examination
- NISM Series IV: Interest Rates Derivatives Certification Examination
- NISM Series V A: Mutual Fund Distributors Certification Examination
- NISM-Series V-B: Mutual Fund Foundation Certification Examination
- NISM Series VI: Depository Operations Certification Examination
- NISM Series VII: Securities Operations and Risk Management Certification Examination
- NISM-Series- VIII: Equity Derivatives Certification Examination
- NISM Series- IX: Merchant Banking Certification Examination
- NISM-Series- X-A: Investment Adviser (Level 1) Certification Examination
- NISM-Series- X-B: Investment Adviser (Level 2) Certification Examination
- NISM-Series- X-C: Investment Adviser Certification (Renewal) Examination
- NISM Series- XII: Securities Markets Foundation Certification Examination+
- NISM Series- XIII: Common Derivatives Certification Examination
- NISM Series- XV: Research Analyst Certification Examination
- NISM Series XV-B: Research Analyst Certification (Renewal) Examination
- NISM-Series- XVI: Commodity Derivatives Certification Examination
- NISM-Series- XVII: Retirement Adviser Certification Examination
- NISM Series XIX - A: Alternative Investment Funds (Category I and II) Distributors Certification Examination+
- NISM-Series- XIX-B: Alternative Investment Funds (Category III) Distributors Certification Examination+
- NISM-Series- XIX-C: Alternative Investment Fund Managers Certification Examination
- NISM Series XXI-A: Portfolio Management Services (PMS) Distributors Certification Examination
- NISM Series XXI-B: Portfolio Managers Certification Examination
- NISM Series XXIII: Social Impact Assessors Certification Examination+
- NISM-Series- XXIV: AML and CFT Provisions in Securities Markets Certification Examination+
- IBBI- Valuation Examination in the Asset Class: Land and Building
- IBBI- Valuation Examination in the Asset Class: Plant and Machinery
- IBBI- Valuation Examination in the Asset Class: Securities or Financial Assets

NISM operates the NISM Skills Registry, a centralized database for verifying certified candidates.

== See also ==
1. Securities and Exchange Board of India
2. Reserve Bank of India
