= Madhabi Puri Buch =

Indian businesswoman (born 1965)

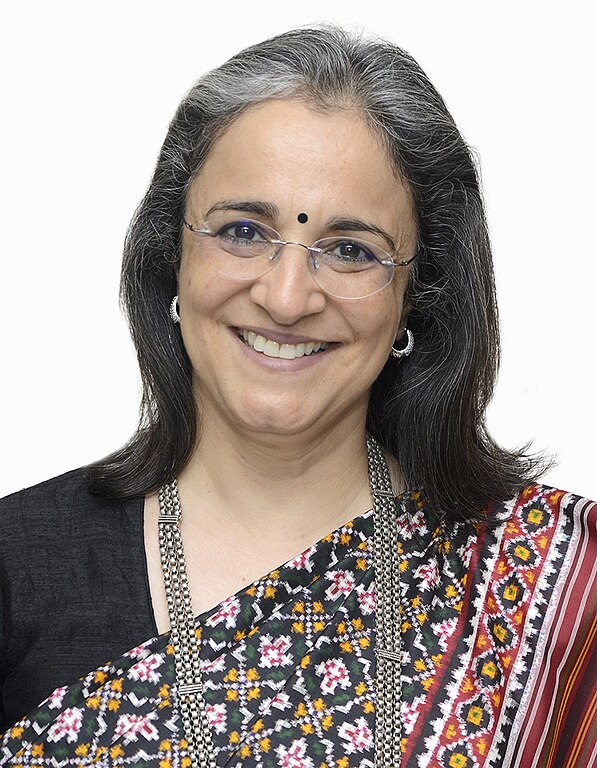

Chairperson of the Securities and Exchange Board of India
- In office 1 March 2022 – 28 February 2025
- Preceded by: Ajay Tyagi
- Succeeded by: Tuhin Kanta Pandey

Personal details
- Born: 12 January 1965 (age 61)
- Spouse: Dhaval Buch
- Education: IIM Ahmedabad; Delhi University

Madhabi Puri Buch (born 12 January 1965) is an Indian business executive who is the former chairperson of the securities regulatory body in India, Securities and Exchange Board of India (SEBI), for 3 years. She was the first woman to lead SEBI, and the first person from the private sector to be appointed to this position.

From April 2017 to March 2022, she functioned as a whole time member of SEBI, and was responsible for important regulatory orders. Buch has been credited with bringing rapid changes that improved the system as well as improved the efficiency of the regulatory body.

In August 2024, Hindenburg Research, a short-selling activist firm, accused her and her husband of having a stake in dubious offshore entities used to artificially inflate shares of companies owned by the Adani Group. They denied the claims.

Trinamool Congress MP Mahua Moitra and Azad Adhikar Sena President Amitabh Thakur presented separate complaints before the Lokpal of India. Lokpal dismissed the complaint and gave a clean chit to Buch, citing a lack of credible evidence.

== Education ==
Buch was educated at Fort Convent School, Mumbai, and at Convent of Jesus and Mary, Delhi. She graduated with a specialization in Mathematics from the St. Stephen's College, Delhi, and later went on to obtain an MBA from IIM Ahmedabad.

== Career ==
=== Corporate career ===
Her career started in 1989 with ICICI Bank. Between 1993 and 1995, Buch worked as lecturer at West Cheshire College in England. She worked in various profiles across companies for 12 years, including sales, marketing and product development. She also led operations. In 2006 she joined ICICI Securities and later went on to become their CEO from February 2009 to May 2011. After this, Buch moved to Singapore to join Greater Pacific Capital in 2011. Between 2011 and 2017 she worked in various capacities as executive director of many companies like Zensar Technologies, InnoVen Capital, and Max Healthcare. Buch also served as an independent director of the Indian School of Development Management (ISDM) and as consultant for New Development Bank (BRICS bank).

=== Career at SEBI ===
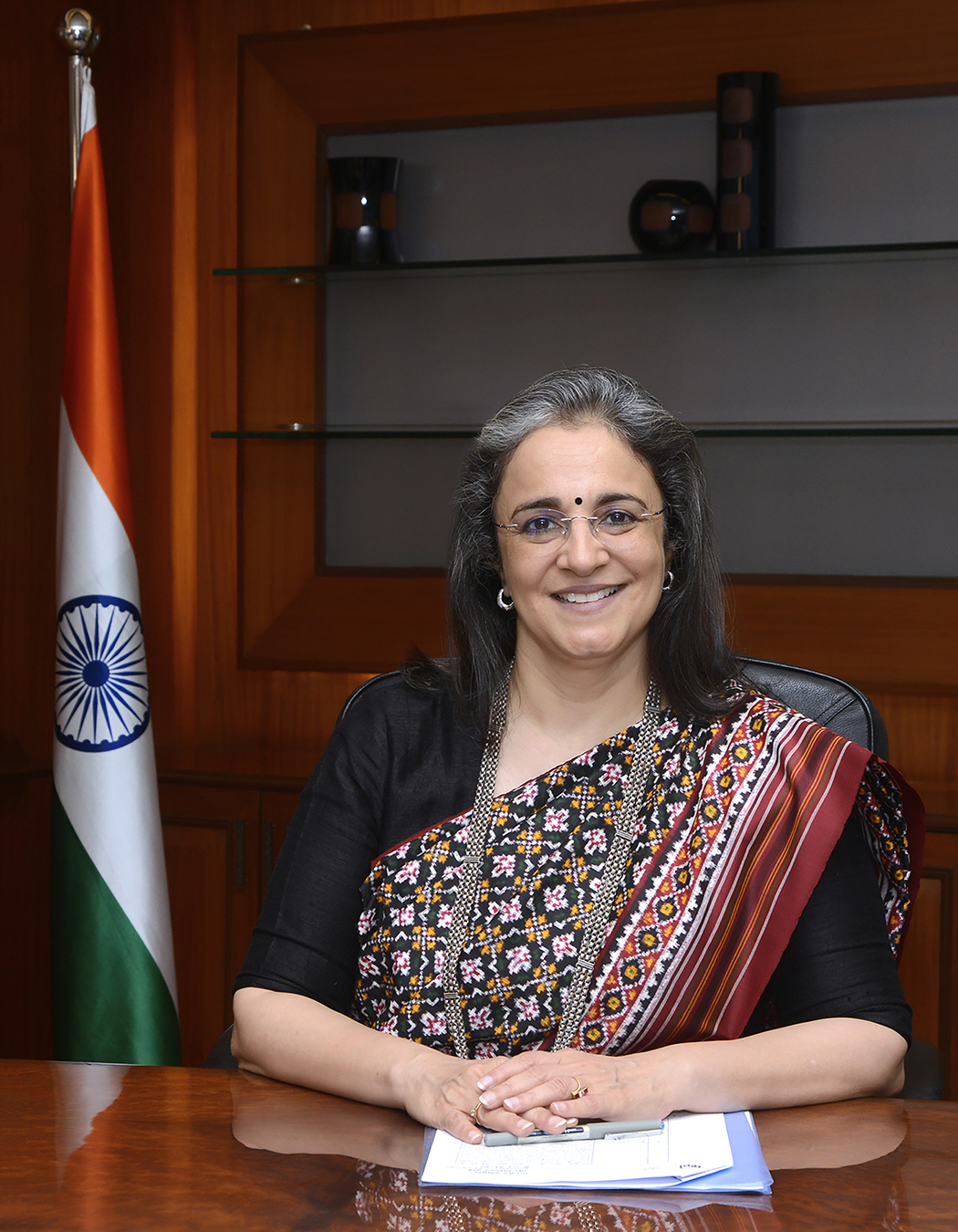
Madhabi Puri Buch as chairperson of SEBI

In April 2017, Buch was appointed as a whole time director at SEBI and given charge of portfolios like collective investment schemes, surveillance and investment management. When her tenure ended, she was appointed to a seven-member technology committee formed to help SEBI design in-house technological systems. Known for her technology and data agnostic attitude, Buch has passed a few landmark regulatory orders. In 2018, she passed an order against the Sahara Group to return the Rs.14,000 crore raised from investors through fully convertible debentures. This was after they violated a SEBI order asking them to furnish the details of repayment to investors. In January 2021, Buch conducted a detailed investigation into insider trading by CNBC Awaaz journalist Hemant Ghai and barred him, his mother and wife from accessing the stock markets. In May 2021, she passed an order against Savla and Ajitkumar for sharing unpublished price sensitive information of Deep Industries stock on the basis of their connection and interaction on social media platform. In August 2021, she identified 15 entities trading in unfair practices in the Zee Entertainment Enterprises stock post its results announcements.

On 1 March 2022, Buch was appointed as the SEBI chairperson for a period of 3 years. She replaced Ajay Tyagi. Joining SEBI at a challenging time, Buch was questioned by the parliamentary committee in reference to the NSE co-location scam. Being a person from the private sector herself, Buch decided to undertake an overhaul of the organization to improve productivity, enhance accountability and improve fairness at SEBI. In her first 100 days as chairperson, she has brought about rapid changes in the organization, processes and regulation of the markets. Buch introduced the corporate system of KRAs to drive focused action on areas that needed attention. She emphasized on cyber security and use of technology and data. She has driven the process of seeking extensive market feedback on any key policy changes. Observers say that Buch has put onus on intermediaries to make changes to their systems to evolve with market dynamics. When she took over, the securities market in India followed a T+2 clearance process. She pushed custodians and clearing corporations to gear up for the T+1 and T+0 clearance process, which would lead to investors receiving their money and shares faster. In 2024, the T+0 settlement system was introduced in a phased manner. Buch also sought additional powers from the government to monitor social media channels to crack down on front running in the markets.

In 2025, the government invited applications for the post of SEBI chairperson, indicating that it would not grant another extension to her. On 27 February 2025, the government appointed Finance and Revenue Secretary Tuhin Kanta Pandey as the new chairperson of SEBI.

== Controversies ==
In August 2024, Hindenburg Research, a short-selling activist firm, accused Puri Buch and her husband of having a stake in offshore entities which invested money into India. They alleged that these same funds, managed by IIFL Wealth, were used by Vinod Adani to artificially inflate shares of companies owned by the Adani Group. This put Buch into the spotlight, since SEBI had previously faced difficulties in finding out the beneficial owners of similar off-shore funds that had invested in Adani companies.

The couple refuted the allegations made against them and said that all disclosures have already been furnished to SEBI over the years. They also issued a statement a day after the report was released, detailing that the fund did not invest in any securities involving the Adani Group when they were invested, and that they had invested in the fund since the fund manager was a close friend. Buch termed Hindenburg's allegations an attempt at "character assassination" after the regulator's enforcement action and "show cause" notice to the short seller for violating Indian rules.

Adani Group calls the claims "malicious, mischievous". India's Leader of the Opposition in the Lok Sabha, Rahul Gandhi, asked Buch to resign.

After a few days, the Indian National Congress accused Buch of receiving rental income from a company SEBI was investigating. It has also alleged as she had continued to earn significant amounts of money through her vested employee stock option plans (ESOPs) of ICICI Bank, long after she had left the company. In the same month, Subhash Chandra Goenka of Zee Entertainment Enterprises blamed her for the collapse of a merger between his company and Sony India.

In September 2024, around 1000 staff members of SEBI staged a rare protest outside the regulator's headquarters demanding Buch's resignation. They complained of a toxic work culture in a letter to the finance ministry.

In November 2024, Gautam Adani and his associates were charged by the New York district court for bribing Indian government officials to get favourable energy contracts. Rahul Gandhi reacted by demanding Adani's arrest and a probe against Puri.

In February 2025, a Mumbai court ordered the Anti-Corruption Bureau (ACB) to register an FIR against her and five others over a complaint that she and other SEBI officials facilitated market manipulation, and enabled corporate fraud by allowing the listing of a company that did not meet the prescribed norms.

== Personal life ==
Buch was born in 1966 as Madhabi Puri to Kamal Puri and his wife. Her father worked for the corporate sector while her mother was an academic with doctorate in political science. At the age of eighteen she got engaged to Dhaval Buch who was a director at FMCG multinational Unilever. They got married when she turned 21 and subsequently gave birth to her son, Abhay. Buch says she owes much of her success to her son and her husband who has been her friend, philosopher and guide.

Buch was one of the survivors of the 26/11 Mumbai terrorist attacks. She was with her husband at the Taj Mahal Palace Hotel who was attending a Unilever meeting at that time.
