= Kailash Nadh =

Indian software developer

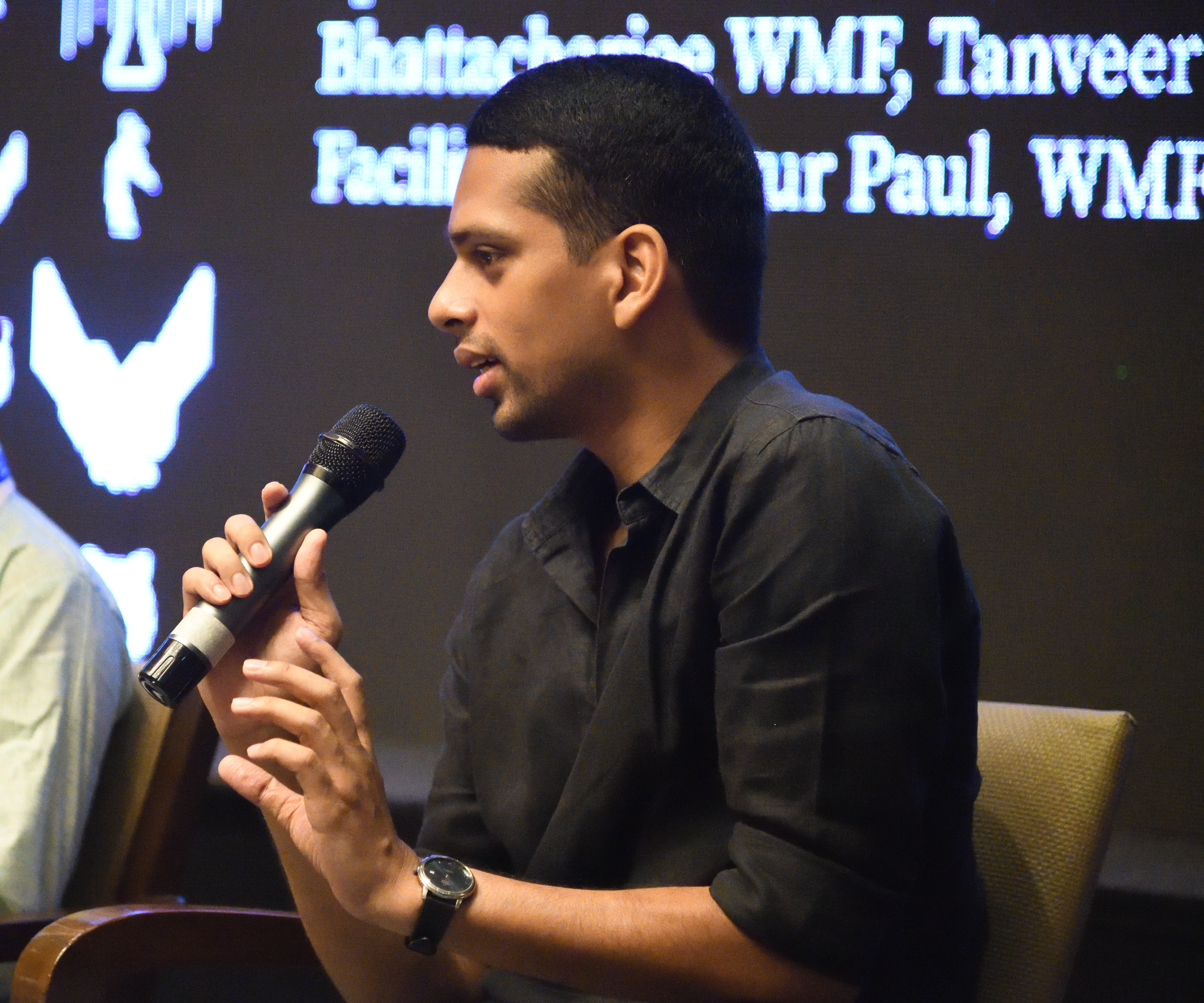
- Nadh in 2023
- Education: Middlesex University (BSc, PhD)
- Occupations: CTO, Zerodha Broking Limited
- Known for: Open source advocacy
- Website: https://nadh.in

Kailash Nadh is an Indian software developer who serves as the Chief Technology Officer of Zerodha, India's largest stock broker. He has held the position since 2013, when he started the company's technology team. Nadh is known for his advocacy of free and open-source software (FOSS) and is the creator of several open-source projects, including listmonk, a self-hosted newsletter and mailing list manager.

In 2024, Nadh announced the launch of FLOSS/fund, a US$1 million annual fund established by Zerodha to support free and open-source software projects globally. He is also a co-founder of the FOSS United Foundation, which promotes free and open-source software development in India.

== Early life and education ==
Nadh studied at Middlesex University in London, where he obtained a BSc in Computer Science and a PhD in Artificial Intelligence and Computational Linguistics.

== Career ==
=== Zerodha ===
Nadh joined Zerodha in 2013, where he started the company's technology team and built its trading platforms from the ground up. Under his leadership, Zerodha has maintained a notably small in-house technology team relative to the scale of its operations. Nadh has stated that the company's reliance on free and open-source software has been central to its success.

Nadh attributes Zerodha's high employee retention to a culture that avoided treating employees as "resources" or "talent" and focused on building relationships.

=== Open-source software ===
Nadh is the creator of listmonk, a high-performance, self-hosted newsletter and mailing list manager written in Go. The project, which is widely used in the open-source community, was developed in part to allow Zerodha to send large volumes of email at minimal cost.

In October 2024, Nadh announced the establishment of FLOSS/fund, a US$1 million annual fund created by Zerodha to provide financial support to free and open-source software projects globally. The fund offers grants ranging from US$10,000 to US$100,000 per project, and is administered by a small team operating as an "Open Source Funding Office" (OSFO). As part of the initiative, Nadh proposed the funding.json manifest file format, intended to allow open-source projects to declare their funding needs in a structured, machine-readable way. In its first round of grants, FLOSS/fund made a US$100,000 contribution to the OpenSSL Foundation.

Announcing the fund, Nadh said that a significant portion of Zerodha's success was owed to free and open-source software, and that the company's structured approach was intended to address the problem of financial sustainability for open-source projects.

=== FOSS United Foundation ===
In 2020, Nadh co-founded the FOSS United Foundation, a non-profit organisation that promotes free and open-source software communities and activities in India.
