= Tuhin Kanta Pandey =

11th Chairman of SEBI

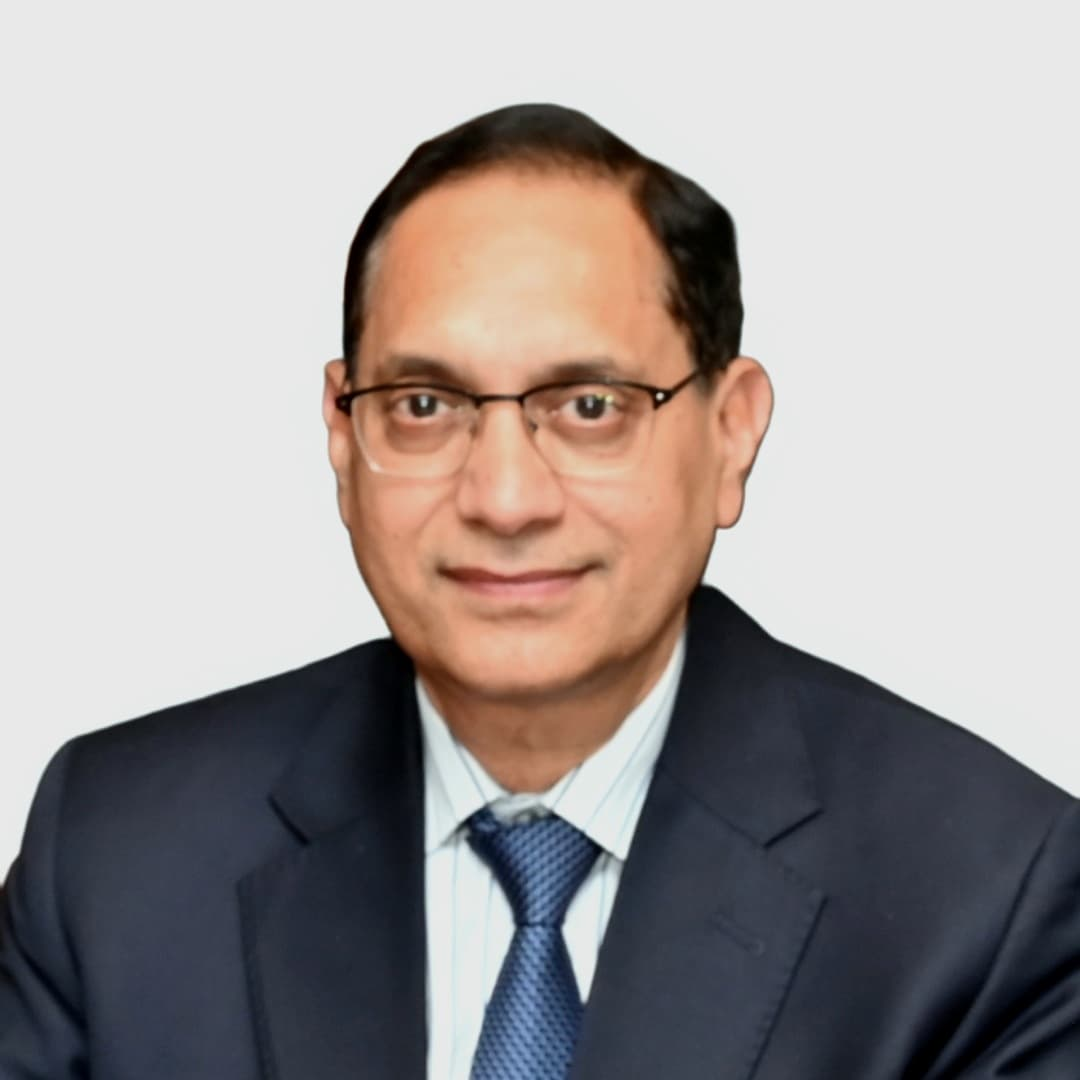

11th Chairman of Securities and Exchange Board of India
- Incumbent
- Assumed office 1 March 2025
- President: Droupadi Murmu
- Prime Minister: Narendra Modi
- Preceded by: Madhabi Puri Buch

Revenue Secretary of India
- In office 9 January 2025 – 28 February 2025
- Appointed by: Appointments Committee of the Cabinet
- Preceded by: Arunish Chawla, IAS
- Succeeded by: Arvind Shrivastava, IAS

Finance Secretary of India
- In office 7 September 2024 – 28 February 2025
- Appointed by: Appointments Committee of the Cabinet
- Preceded by: T.V. Somanathan, IAS
- Succeeded by: Ajay Seth, IAS

Secretary of Department of Investment and Public Asset Management
- In office 22 October 2019 – 8 January 2025
- Appointed by: Appointments Committee of the Cabinet
- Preceded by: Anil Kumar Khachi, IAS
- Succeeded by: Arunish Chawla,IAS

Personal details
- Born: 8 July 1965 (age 61) Odisha, India
- Education: (MBA) University of Birmingham (BA) (MA) Panjab University
- Occupation: Retired IAS officer

Tuhin Kanta Pandey (born 8 July 1965) is a retired 1987 batch IAS officer of the Odisha Cadre who serves as the 11th and current Chairman of Securities and Exchange Board of India since March 1, 2025.

== Early life and education ==
Pandey was born on 8 July 1965 in the state of Odisha, India. He completed his B.A. degree in English and an M.A degree in Economics from Panjab University in Chandigarh, and an MBA from the University of Birmingham, UK.

== Career ==
Pandey is a retired Indian Administrative Service officer of the 1987 batch Odisha Cadre and has a nearly four-decade long career in public administration starting as the executive director of the Odisha State Financial Corporation (OSFC) and managing director of Odisha Small Industries Corporation (OSIC) before serving as the district collector and magistrate of Odisha's Sambalpur district.

He then moved from Odisha on central deputation to New Delhi, to serve as the Deputy Secretary at the Department of Commerce and later to the regional office of the United Nations Industrial Development Organization (UNIDO). Later, upon returning to the Odisha cadre, he worked with the State's Transport, Health and Commercial Taxes departments. Pandey then took over as the Principal Secretary of Odisha's Finance Department in 2016.

On October 24, 2019, he was appointed as the Secretary of Department of Investment and Public Asset Management (DIPAM) for five years making him the longest serving secretary in Department's history. As Secretary of (DIPAM) Pandey oversaw the privatisation of Air India and the initial public offering (IPO) of Life Insurance Corporation(LIC).

In September 2024, Pandey was appointed as Finance Secretary succeeding T. V. Somanathan and in January 2025, Pandey took charge as the Secretary, Department of Revenue (DoR), Ministry of Finance.

Pandey was appointed as the 11th Chairman of SEBI on February 27, 2025, for a three-year term and assumed office on 1 March 2025 succeeding Madhabi Puri Buch.
