= Securities Laws (Amendment) Act, 2014 =

Parliament of India
- Long title: An Act further to amend the Securities and Exchange Board of India Act, 1992, the Securities Contracts (Regulation) Act, 1956 and the Depositories Act, 1996
- Citation: Act No. 27 of 2014
- Territorial extent: Whole of India
- Enacted by: Parliament of India
- Assented to: 22 August 2014
- Commenced: 25 August 2014
- Status: In force

The Securities Laws (Amendment) Act, 2014 is a legislation in India which provided the securities market regulator Securities and Exchange Board of India (SEBI) with new powers to effectively pursue fraudulent investment schemes, especially Ponzi schemes. The bill also provides guidelines for the formation of special fast trial courts.

== History ==
After the Saradha Group financial scandal, the Government of India formed an inter-ministerial group to find ways to close off loopholes the regulations which allowed such pyramid schemes to operate. The Securities Law (Amendment) Ordinance was promulgated on 17 July 2013, then for a second time in September 2013. It lapsed on 15 January 2014. The bill couldn't be presented in the winter session of Parliament as the standing committee on finance had not finalized the report. It promulgated for a third time on 28 March 2014.

On 24 July 2014, Cabinet Committee on Economic Affairs (CCEA) approved the bill. The bill was introduced by Minister of State for Finance Nirmala Sitharaman in the Lok Sabha on 4 August 2014. She also introduced bills to amend Securities Contracts (Regulation) Act, 1956 and Depositories Act, 1996. The bills were introduced in the name of Finance Minister Arun Jaitley, but he himself was unable to attend the house. The bill was passed by the Lok Sabha on 6 August 2014.

== Summary ==
The ordinance passed in March 2014 had 30 clauses, whereas the bill contained 57 clauses. The bill amended three pre-existing market related laws. It retained the powers given to SEBI in the ordinance, but also introduced safeguards against misuse.

The new law gave SEBI the power to search and obtain information, including call records, about any suspected entity from within or outside the firm. However, before conducting such searches SEBI must obtain a warrant from a Mumbai court. Any unregistered scheme with a capital of more than a ₹100 crore was deemed a collective investment scheme, allowing SEBI to regulate it. Under pre-existing regulations, all collective investment schemes had to register with SEBI. However, many came to SEBI's attention only after complaints from defrauded investors.

Depending on the nature of the crime, minimum penalties may range from ₹1 lakh to ₹10 lakh. The minimum penalty for securities related crimes was set at ₹1 lakh. The minimum penalty for insider trading was at ₹10 lakh. The maximum penalty for insider trading was set at ₹25 crore or three times the profit, whichever was higher. SEBI was given the authority to initiate recovery and sale of assets. SEBI has also been given the power to enhance a penalty or settle an ongoing legal proceeding. Guidelines for special courts were also included in the bill.

== See also ==
- Saradha Group financial scandal
- Securities and Exchange Board of India (Alternative Investment Funds) Regulations, 2012
