= Cheating in online chess =

Advancements in computer performance and chess engine development have culminated in virtually all users of online chess sites having the means to access engine play far superior to that of even the world's strongest human players. Some users employ engine assistance while in play, which is considered cheating in most cases. To combat this, the most prominent online chess platforms, Chess.com and Lichess, devote significant resources to detecting and handling cheaters, and cheaters employ methods of evading detection, such as cheating only occasionally, in turn.

It is often impossible to determine with absolute certainty whether a player is cheating. Chess sites typically scrutinize multiple games in their analyses of prospective cheaters to limit false positives, but they still rarely occur. Ways of dealing with detected cheaters include permanent but appealable bans, used by Chess.com, and secretly matchmaking cheaters with each other, used by Lichess.

Titled players, even grandmasters, have been caught cheating online. Cheaters have also been found in online tournaments with cash prizes, such as Titled Tuesday, despite these tournaments implementing rigorous and intrusive anti-cheating measures. Accusations of online cheating have been levied between titled players, including by former World Champion Vladimir Kramnik.

== Overview ==
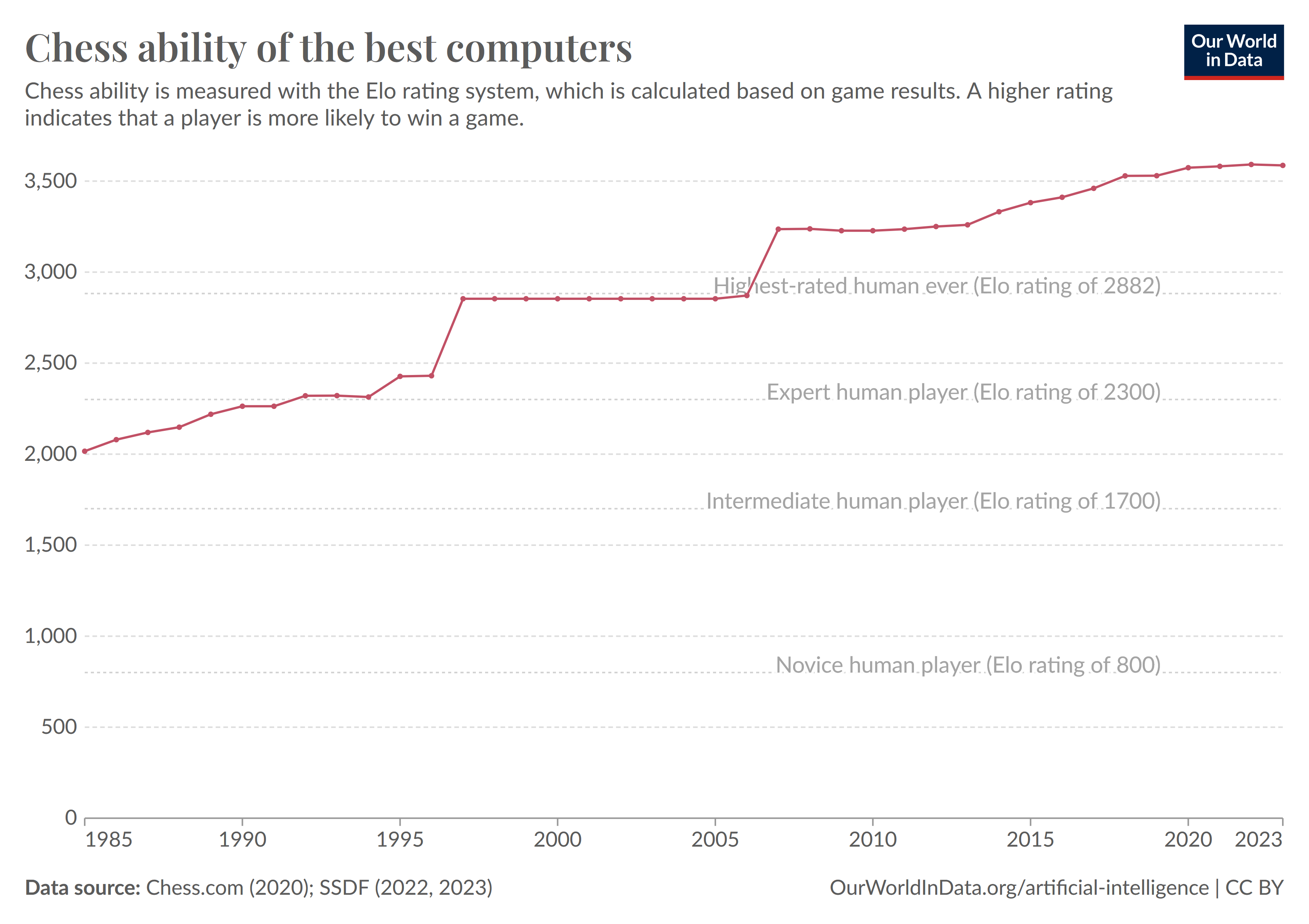
Computers have far surpassed the best human chess players. Note that the ratings shown are for slow chess; the disparity between humans and engines widens in faster time controls, as human performance is more reliant on time.

Both Chess.com and Lichess prohibit any outside assistance in rated games, except in correspondence play where players may refer only to personal notes, opening books, and other static resources. Despite this, some players refer to engines while in play, giving them an unfair advantage over their opponents. In 2022, it was estimated that the world's strongest chess engine, Stockfish, which is free and open source, could be expected to beat the world's strongest human player, Magnus Carlsen, in 98% of games, drawing him in the remaining 2%.

For ordinary players, defeating engine-assisted opponents is only possible when cheaters make mistakes. These are not strategic miscalculations, but practical errors such as inputting incorrect moves, misreading the board position, or deliberately selecting suboptimal moves to appear convincingly human. Success does not stem from superior calculation or positional understanding. It arises solely from the cheater's need to conceal their advantage, which creates rare and fleeting vulnerabilities.

Roughly 0.6% of Chess.com accounts have been closed for cheating. Chess.com claims it analyzed 2.5 million games in 2023, and that it banned 1 million accounts for cheating that same year. Since International Master Danny Rensch has claimed that the site only conducts bans it is "willing to go to court" over, the actual number of cheaters can be significantly higher.

Lichess claims that it handled 91,000 reports for cheating in 2022 and 93,000 in 2023, and that it flagged 61,000 and 72,000 accounts for cheating in those two years, respectively; it's unclear how many of the flagged accounts were also reported.

== Countermeasures ==
=== Detection ===
Chess sites employ numerous tracking and analytical methods in their attempts to accurately detect cheaters. Lichess maintains an open source machine learning tool for cheating detection, but does not disclose whether it relies on other, closed source tools. While most cheaters are obvious enough to be detected automatically, more difficult cases require human analysis. Speaking for Chess.com, International Master Danny Rensch has claimed that the site only conducts bans it is "willing to go to court" over.

==== Statistical analysis ====
Modern chess engines are substantially stronger than human players and can therefore be used as a benchmark for evaluating the quality of moves in a position.

Chess cheat detection can use an engine to evaluate the available moves in each position, then model how likely a human of a given rating would be to choose moves of that quality, producing an expected “human” performance profile. A player becomes statistically suspicious when, across enough positions, their moves match engine choices or achieve engine-like quality more often than that model predicts for someone of their strength.

Position complexity can make engine agreement more informative by distinguishing easy or forced moves from positions where even the engine's preferred move only emerges after deep calculation. A top-engine move in a high-complexity position is therefore stronger evidence of possible engine assistance, especially when combined with signals such as centipawn loss, engine agreement, or the player's expected strength.

ChessCheatDetector.com implements an approximation of position complexity, for the purposes of cheat detection, by comparing an engine's move rankings across successive search depths using a generalized version of the Kendall tau distance, with greater changes in the rankings indicating higher complexity.

=== Treatment ===
Chess.com and Lichess differ in how they handle accounts they determine to be cheating. Chess.com publicly issues permanent bans, visible as a crossed red circle icon next to the names of banned users. In addition, the site refunds the rating points of players who have recently lost games to banned accounts. In contrast, Lichess tends to secretly place detected cheaters in a separate playing pool, which prevents cheaters from knowing when they have been caught. Chess.com and Lichess both allow detected cheaters to appeal their ban statuses. Of roughly 39,000 appeals processed by Chess.com in 2023, about 0.3% were granted.

=== Evasion ===
Cheaters can be hard to catch.

== Psychology and reactions ==
=== Opponents of cheaters ===
In games against cheaters, players may feel hopeless or frustrated. Unwitting opponents of cheaters commonly feel that all of their plans and ideas are being seen through with ease, which may reduce the level of confidence they have in their play. Players have been found to play more poorly when they believe they have faced a cheater, even in subsequent games against legitimate players.

Paranoia is a common response to real and perceived widespread cheating. A study conducted by grandmaster David Smerdon that matched players against both legitimate players and cheaters and rewarded or penalized them based on how accurately they appraised their opponents found that players correctly judged their opponents 68.75% of the time. 30% of cheaters were correctly judged, and 83% of non-cheaters were correctly acquitted. The study also asked players to rate how confident they were in their judgements; the three most confident cheating accusations were against non-cheaters. The belief that many of one's opponents are cheating is thought to have driven some players to begin cheating themselves.

== At the master level ==
Of the 550,000 account closures for cheating conducted by Chess.com up to 2022, 550 were on accounts verified to be owned by titled players. 165 out of the roughly 1 million accounts closed by Chess.com for cheating in 2023 were titled; of these, 20 were grandmaster accounts. In 2023, Chess.com claimed that it had "closed hundreds of titled players, dozens of grandmasters, and 4 players in the top 100."

Chess.com mandates compliance with intrusive anti-cheating methods in all prize money tournaments it hosts. Tournament players may be expected to join a Zoom call with an open mic and one or more cameras to record live feeds of their room and/or screen, and to send the feed(s) to Chess.com at a moment's notice. Players may also be asked to "sweep" their rooms with a camera, show the running processes on their computer, not wear headphones, and to show their computer's display settings. Streamers may be required to apply broadcast delay, and to set their stream chats to emote only (unless they can prove they cannot see their chat, in which case they may be given permission).

In December 2024, Chess.com announced a new monitoring program named Proctor, which they intend to replace Zoom calls with. The program consists of a browser with tracking features attached, and Chess.com reports that it monitors players' screens, running programs, and camera and audio feeds. In their announcement post, Chess.com compares Proctor with exam software to emphasize the relative necessity of its use. Proctor will not be required outside of prize events.

Despite these measures, cheaters are still occasionally found in online prize events, such as Titled Tuesday. In one prominent case, grandmaster Wesley So accused fellow grandmaster Tigran L. Petrosian of cheating against him in the 2020 PRO Chess League; Petrosian countered by accusing So of "doing PIPI [sic] in [his] pampers when [Petrosian] was beating players much more stronger [sic] then [sic] [him]". Chess.com determined Petrosian to have cheated, and he was permanently banned from the site.

=== Allegations by Kramnik ===
Vladimir Kramnik, former World Chess Champion, has accused numerous titled Chess.com users of cheating in online games. Starting in November 2023, he has alleged that chess streamer and grandmaster Hikaru Nakamura was cheating online. In particular, Kramnik pointed to a 46 game unbeaten streak achieved by Hikaru as something "everyone would find interesting". However, Hikaru entered losing positions on multiple occasions within the streak. Statisticians have analyzed Hikaru's games, and have come to conflicting conclusions. After analyzing the 46 game streak, Chess.com reported that its occurrence was "not only possible, but likely given the number of games played".

== See also ==
- Cheating in online games
