= C. B. Bhave =

Indian financial regulator

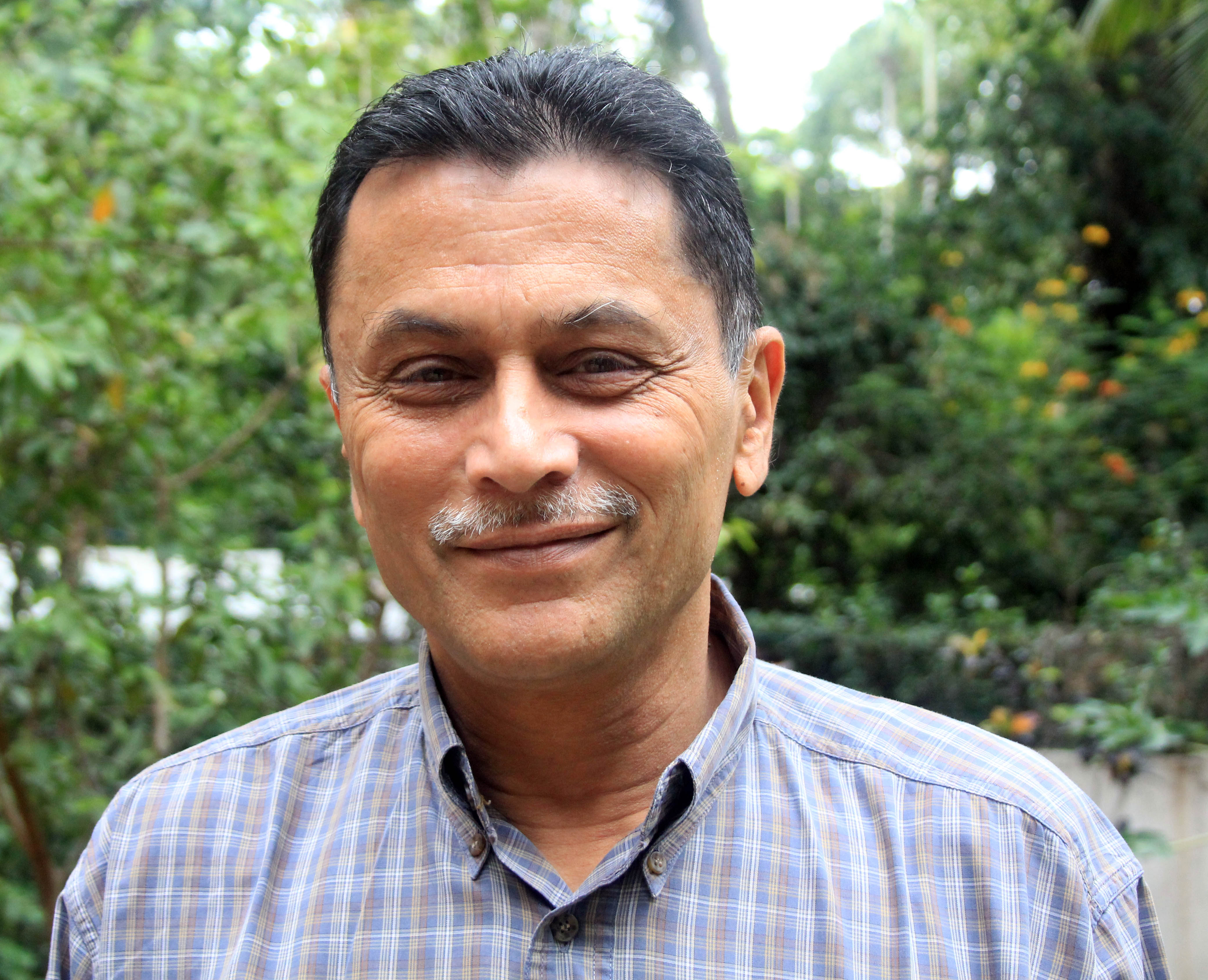

Chairman of the Securities and Exchange Board of India
- In office 2008–2011
- Preceded by: Meleveetil Damodaran
- Succeeded by: Upendra Kumar Sinha

Personal details
- Born: 28 August 1950 (age 76) Nagpur, Maharashtra, India
- Education: Jabalpur Engineering College
- Occupation: Administrator

Chandrasekhar Bhaskar Bhave (born 28 August 1950) was an Indian bureaucrat and financial regulator. He was appointed as the Chairman of the Securities and Exchange Board of India (SEBI) in 2008 for a period of three years.

He was SEBI's senior executive director from 1992–1996. After that, he became Chairman and Managing Director of the then newly created National Securities Depository Limited (NSDL). He was also member of the government's technology advisory group, TAGUP. He is the Chairperson of the Indian Institute for Human Settlements (IIHS).

Many prominent personalities including Jaswant Singh (former Finance Minister), Vinod Rai (former Comptroller and Auditor General), Deepak Parekh (Chairman, Housing Development Finance Corporation), Jairam Ramesh (Rural Development Minister) have described Bhave as an "outstanding, honest and upright" officer.

== Early life ==
Bhave was born in Nagpur, Maharashtra. He is an electrical engineer from the Jabalpur Engineering College, and a 1975 batch Indian Administrative Service (IAS) officer.

== Career ==
Bhave started out an IAS officer in Maharashtra. He was additional Industries Commissioner of Maharashtra for three years. He moved up to the Centre with a position as undersecretary in the Ministry of Finance and deputy secretary in the Ministry of Petroleum.

When G. V. Ramakrishna became chairman of SEBI, he invited Bhave to join him. This led to a highly successful first stint at SEBI, which ushered in the revolution of the Indian equity market.

Bhave had irreconcilable differences with D. R. Mehta, the next SEBI Chairman, and strong views about the direction of reforms of the equity market. He left SEBI to lead what was then a start-up, the National Securities Depository Limited (NSDL). Bhave took over as managing director. This was also a highly successful period, where India made the transition into dematerialised settlement at the depository.

Bhave came back to SEBI as chairman in 2008 for three years.
