= ICICI Securities =

Indian financial services company

ICICI Securities Limited
- Company type: Subsidiary
- Industry: Financial services
- Founded: 1995; 31 years ago
- Headquarters: Mumbai, Maharashtra, India
- Area served: India and international markets
- Key people: T.K. Srirang (MD & CEO)
- Products: Securities brokerage, Financial product distribution, Wealth management, Investment banking services
- Parent: ICICI Bank Limited
- Website: icicisecurities.com

ICICI Securities Limited is an Indian financial services company headquartered in Mumbai, Maharashtra. It is a subsidiary of ICICI Bank and operates in the areas of investment banking, retail and institutional broking, and wealth management.

== History ==
ICICI Securities was incorporated on March 9, 1995, as ICICI Brokerage Services Limited, a wholly owned subsidiary of ICICI Bank.

In 2000, the company launched ICICI Direct, an online trading platform, a key part of its retail brokerage business. Over the following years, it expanded into derivatives and commodity trading, insurance distribution, and private wealth management.

In 2007, the company was renamed ICICI Securities Limited. It also began offering overseas services and global investment options through digital infrastructure.

On June 29, 2023, ICICI Bank's board and SEBI approved a proposal to delist the company through a share swap arrangement, as part of a strategic restructuring to consolidate operations.

== Financial performance ==
For the financial year ended March 2025, ICICI Securities reported a net profit of ₹1,941.45 crore.

== See also ==
- Reserve Bank of India
- ICICI Prudential Life Insurance
- ICICI Prudential Mutual Fund
