= Money market in India =

The Money market in India is a component of financial markets in India for short-term funds with maturity ranging from overnight to one year including financial instruments that are deemed to be close substitutes of money. Similar to developed economies the Indian money market is diversified and has evolved through many stages, from the conventional platform of treasury bills and call money to commercial paper, certificates of deposit, repos, forward rate agreements and most recently interest rate swaps

The Indian money market consists of diverse sub-markets, each dealing in a particular type of short-term credit. The money market fulfills the borrowing and investment requirements of providers and users of short-term funds, and balances the demand for and supply of short-term funds by providing an equilibrium mechanism. It also serves as a focal point for the central bank's intervention in the market.

== Reserve Bank of India ==
The influence of the Reserve Bank of India's power over the Indian money market is confined almost exclusively to the organised banking structure. It is also considered to be the biggest regulator in the markets. There are certain rates and data which are released at regular intervals which have a huge impact on all the financial markets in India. The unorganised sector, which consists mostly of indigenous bankers and non-banking financial companies, although occupying an important position in the money market have not been properly integrated with the rest of the money market.

== See also ==
- Commercial paper
- Commercial paper in India
- Certificate of deposit
