= École supérieure de commerce de Pau =

French business school

Coordinates: 43°19′3″N 0°21′56″W

Pau Business School
- École Supérieure de Commerce de Pau
- Type: Private
- Established: 1969
- Budget: 13,7 million
- Dean: Sébastien Chantelot
- Students: 1353
- Location: Pau, France
- Website: www.esc-pau.com

The École Supérieure de Commerce de Pau (or ESC Pau) is a French business school created in 1969.

== Facilities & Infrastructure ==
=== Campus ===
- The campus covers 40,000 square metres and has 10,000 square metres of learning areas for 941 students.
- Broadband Internet, with Wi-Fi wireless connections, which cover all the buildings and the campus. There are more than 60 Internet access points all over the school.
- An Intranet network that can only be used by students and teachers in the school.

=== Lecture and class rooms ===
- 1 lecture hall with a 300-seat capacity and 1 with 100 seats equipped with networked computers, videoconferencing and video projection on a projection screen.
- 21 lecture rooms each with a 40-seat capacity for studying in small groups.
- 38 class rooms for lessons in sub-groups (languages and workshops) and teamwork.
- 10 rooms reserved for student union associations equipped with computers and telephones to allow you to work on projects in optimum conditions.
- 203 open access computers.
- 1 language lab.
- 1 video and hi-fi control room at students and teachers’ disposal.
- 1 video studio to stage the school paper or practice interviews.
- 1 business incubator to enable graduates to continue working on a company creation or takeover project when they leave school.

=== Student life ===
- 1 student clubroom renovated in 2003, equipped with an audio control room, a bar, a snack bar service, a relaxation area (sofa, darts, table football, computer games, table tennis tables, etc.), Internet access and a terrace giving onto the campus.
- 1 Media Center: a light spacious area that is pleasant to work in, containing 15000 books (French and international academic works, literary works), 350 press subscriptions, an INSEE (National Statistic and Economic study Institute) and APEC (Executive Employment Association) space (access to all the resources of these two organizations.
- 1 worldwide electronic library (access reserved to students and teachers) : 11000 newspapers, 8600 international academic periodicals, 100 000 market studies, reports and balance sheets of all European companies, balance sheets and economic perspectives for all the countries in the world, memorandums and summaries of the best academic works. This library is an advantage that you should highlight when trying to obtain a placement or a mission in a company. It is also a practical way to find out what is going on in universities around the world, either for simple information, or from the perspective of studying abroad.
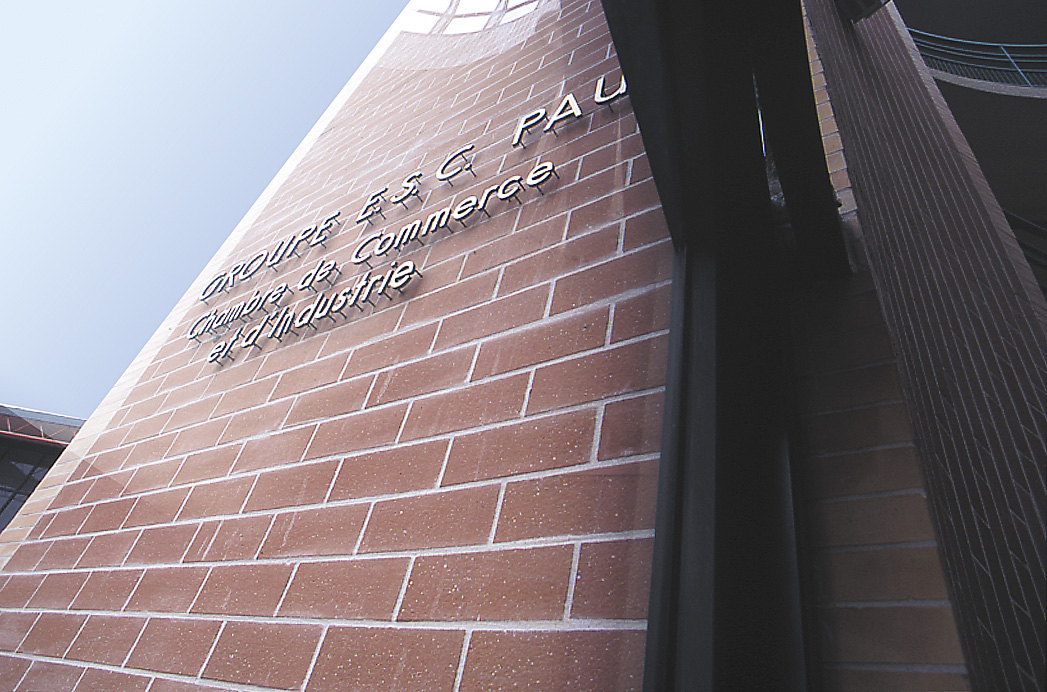
ESC Pau

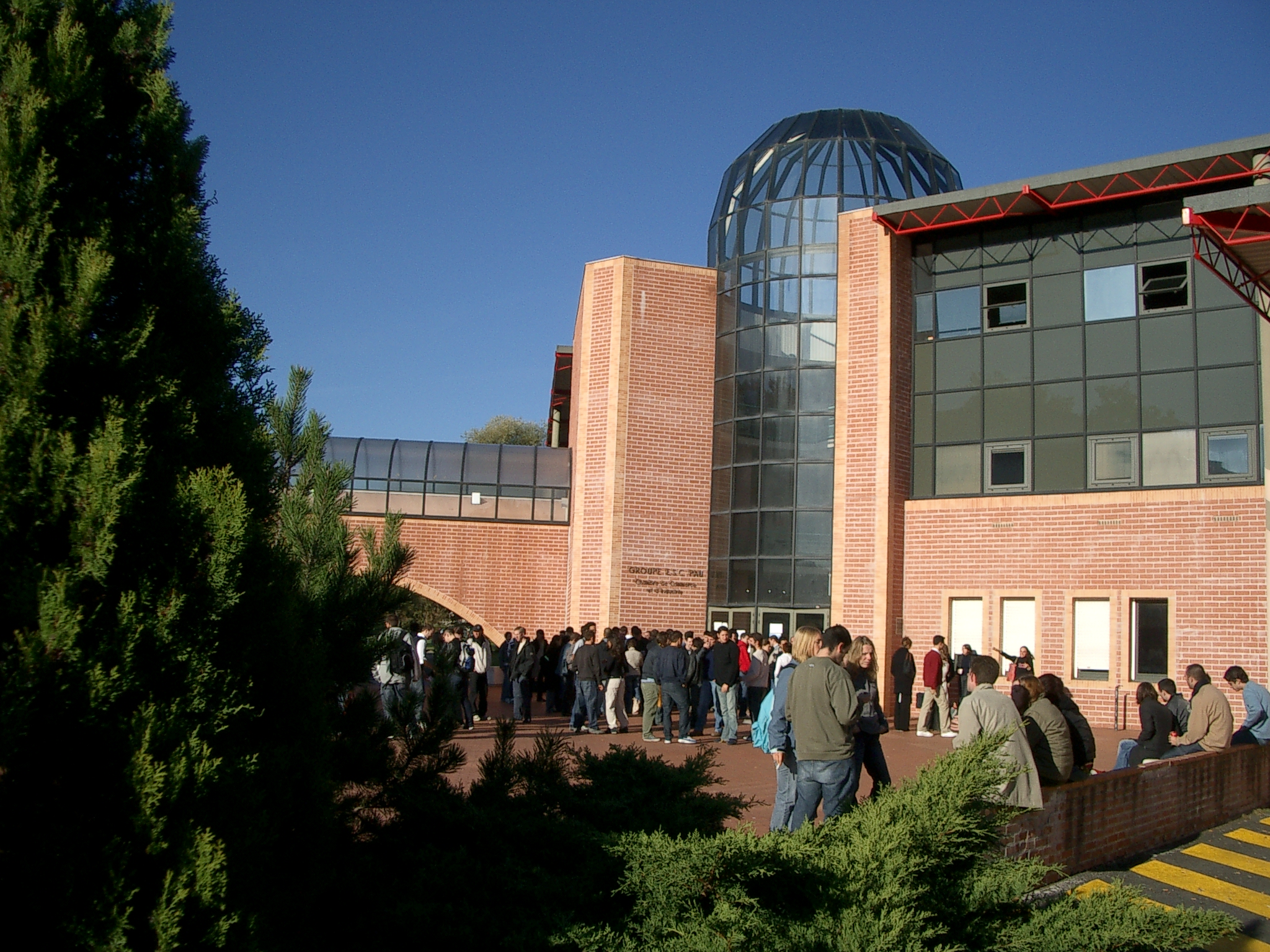
ESC Pau

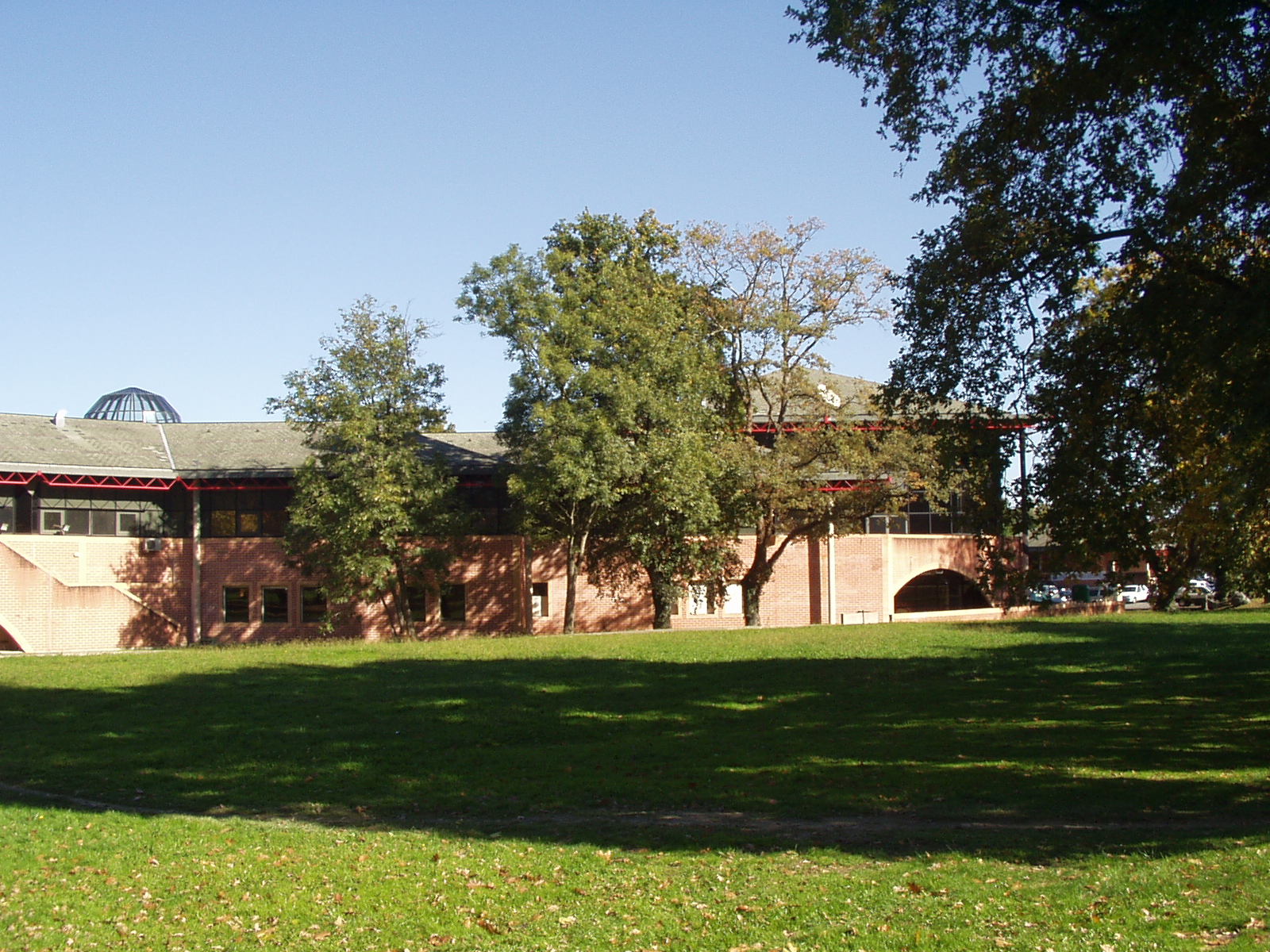
ESC Pau
