= M. Damodaran =

Indian corporate advisor and former government official

Meleveetil Damodaran

Chairman of the Securities and Exchange Board of India
- In office 2005–2008
- Preceded by: G.N.Bajpai
- Succeeded by: Chandrasekhar Bhaskar Bhave

Personal details
- Born: Palakkad, Kerala, India

Meleveetil Damodaran is an Indian executive and former Indian Administrative Service officer of Tripura cadre. He has served as the Chairman of Securities and Exchange Board of India.
