= Association of Mutual Funds of India =

Association of mutual funds in India

Association of Mutual Funds in India
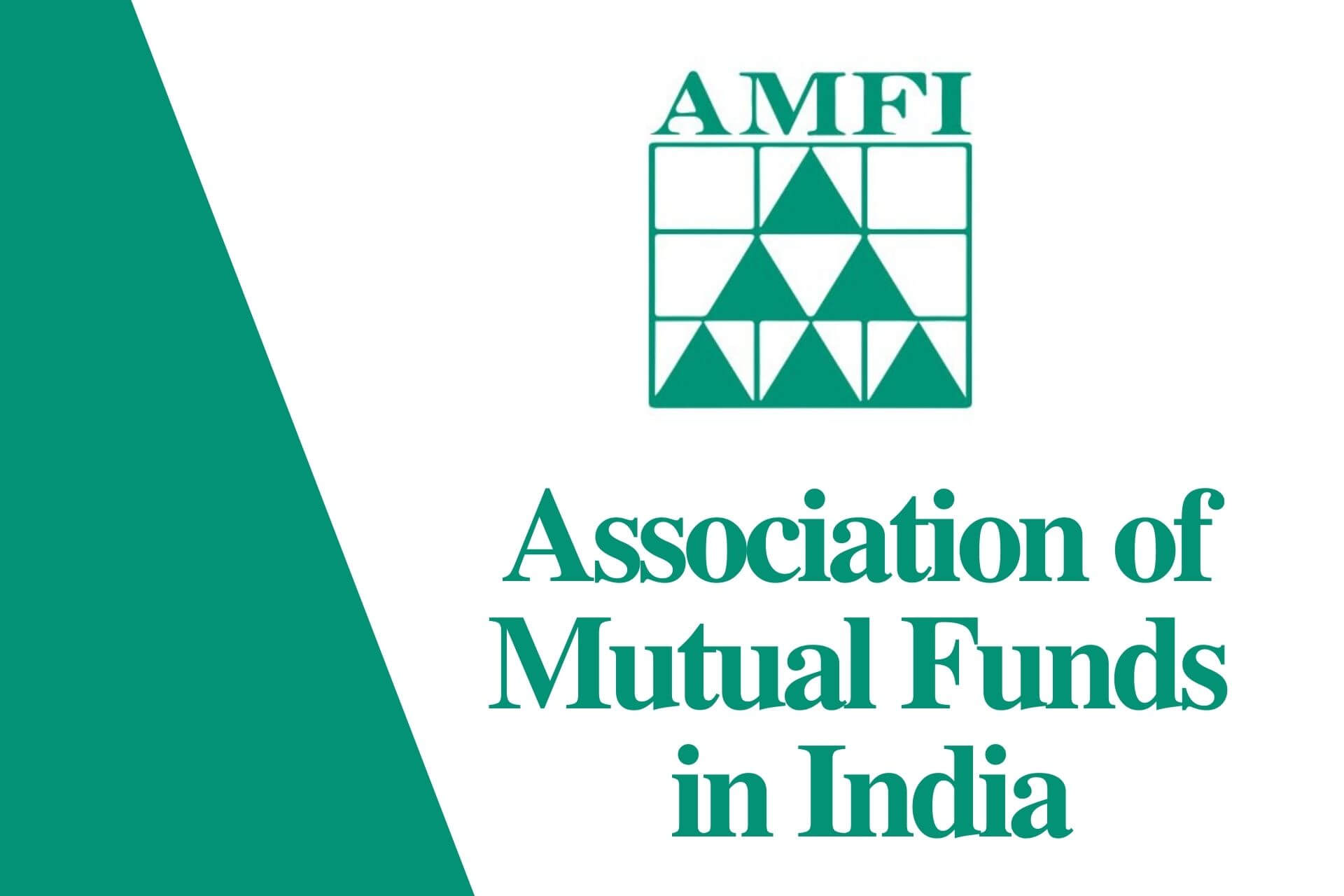
- Abbreviation: AMFI
- Formation: 22 August 1995; 30 years ago
- Type: Trade association (Profit Organisation)
- Purpose: Represent Indian asset management companies
- Location: Mumbai, Maharashtra, India
- Region served: India
- Members: 49
- Key people: Chalasani Venkat Nageswar (Chief Executive Officer); S L Pandian (Dy. Chief Executive Officer)
- Website: www.amfiindia.com

Association of Mutual Funds in India (AMFI) is an Indian trade association for all the asset management companies of SEBI registered mutual funds in India.

== History ==
It was incorporated on 22 August 1995, as a non-profit organisation. As of now, 49 asset management companies that are registered with SEBI, are its members. Most mutual funds firms in India are its members.

The organisation aims to develop the mutual funds market in India, by improving ethical and professional standards. As of August 2025, there are 49 members. These are asset management companies which are registered with AMFI with assets under management of over ₹75 lakh crore.
