= Securities and Exchange Board of India =

Secondary markets' regulator in India

Securities and Exchange Board of India (SEBI)
- भारतीय प्रतिभूति और विनिमय बोर्ड
- State Emblem of India

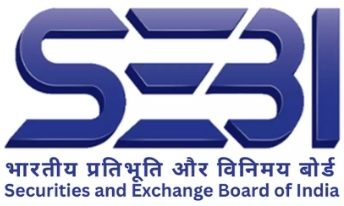
- Logo of the SEBI

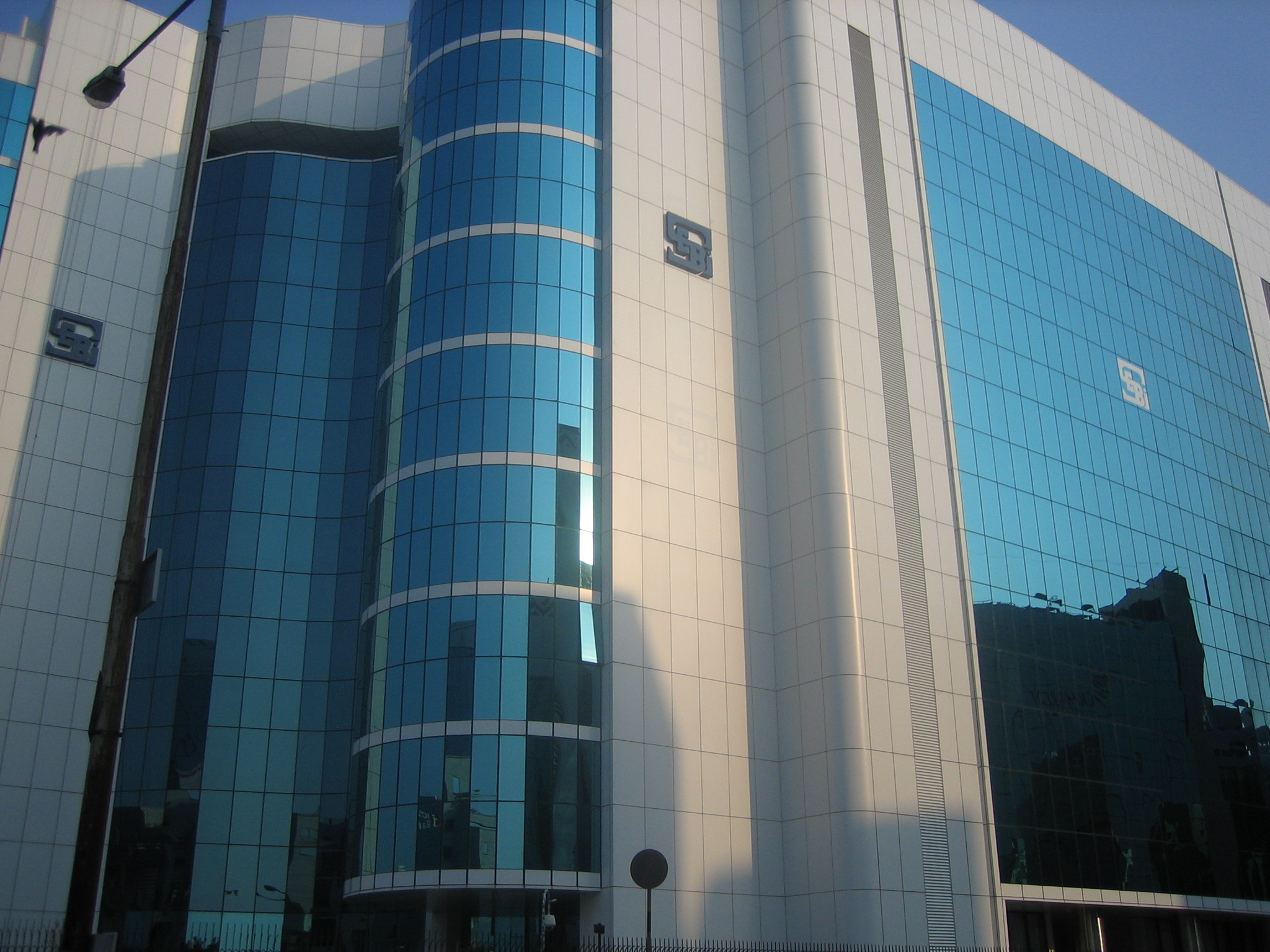
- SEBI Bhavan, Mumbai

Agency overview
- Formed: 12 April 1988; 38 years ago (established); 30 January 1992; 34 years ago (accorded statutory status)
- Preceding Agency: Controller of Capital Issues
- Type: Regulatory agency
- Jurisdiction: India
- Headquarters: Mumbai, Maharashtra, India
- Employees: 980 (2022)
- Minister responsible: Nirmala Sitharaman
- Agency executive: Tuhin Kanta Pandey, Chairperson
- Parent department: Ministry of Finance, Government of India
- Parent: Ministry of Finance (India)
- Key document: Securities and Exchange Board of India Act, 1992
- Website: www.sebi.gov.in/index.html

The Securities and Exchange Board of India (SEBI) is the regulatory agency for India's securities and commodity derivatives markets and falls under the administrative domain of the Ministry of Finance within the Government of India. It was established on 12 April 1988 as an executive body and was given statutory powers on 30 January 1992 through the SEBI Act, 1992. Its mandate under the Act is "to protect the interests of investors in securities and to promote the development of, and to regulate, the securities market and for matters connected therewith".

SEBI regulates the secondary markets in India; it is a quasi-executive and quasi-judicial body that enforces and adjudicates securities laws; appeals against its orders lie to the Securities Appellate Tribunal. It has been criticised for slow detection of frauds and market abuse, and its independence has been questioned. In 2024, Hindenberg Research alleged that its chairperson, Madhabi Puri Buch, had a conflict of interest, which she denied. Lawyers and economists have criticised SEBI's breadth of powers and its reliance on circulars and notifications.

== History ==
The board was established in 1988 as a non-statutory body for regulating the securities market. Before then, the Controller of Capital Issues was the market's regulatory authority, and derived powers from the Capital Issues (Control) Act, 1947. It became an autonomous body on 30 January 1992 and was accorded statutory powers with the passing of the SEBI Act, 1992 by the Parliament of India.

After a 1999 amendment, collective investment schemes were brought under the SEBI except nidhis, chit funds, and cooperatives. The Securities Laws (Amendment) Act, 2014, gave wider powers to SEBI, including the authority to request records, search and seizure powers, and the power to attach assets of violators for recovery. The amendment also established special designated courts to prosecute violators of securities laws. The Forward Markets Commission, which regulated the commodities market, was merged into SEBI in 2015 to streamline the regulatory framework. The government introduced the Securities Market Code in December 2025 to modernise the regulatory framework. The code is pending before the Standing Committee on Finance.

SEBI is headquartered in Bandra Kurla Complex business district in Mumbai and has Northern, Eastern, Southern and Western Regional Offices in New Delhi, Kolkata, Chennai, and Ahmedabad, respectively. Until June 2023, it also had 17 local offices across India to promote investor education; however, 16 were closed as part of a restructuring exercise.

== Organisation and governance ==
Tuhin Kanta Pandey took charge as Chairman on 1 March 2025, replacing Madhabi Puri Buch, whose term ended on 28 February 2025.

SEBI is managed by its 9-member board of members, which consist of the following people:

- The chairman, who is nominated by the Union Government of India.
- Two members from the Union Finance Ministry.
- One member from the Reserve Bank of India.
- The remaining five members are nominated by the Union Government of India, and out of them at least three should be whole-time members.

=== Current board members ===
The board currently comprises:

Name	Designation
Tuhin Kanta Pandey	Chairperson
Amarjeet Singh	Whole time member
Kamlesh Chandra Varshney	Whole time member
Sandip Pradhan	Whole time member
K V Ramana Murthy	Whole time member

=== List of Chairpersons ===
The list of SEBI's chairpersons is:

Name	From	To
Dr. S. A. Dave	12 April 1988	23 August 1990
G. V. Ramakrishna	24 August 1990	17 January 1994
S. S. Parthasarathy	17 January 1994	31 January 1995
D. R. Mehta	21 February 1995	20 February 2002
G. N. Das	20 February 2002	18 February 2005
M. Damodaran	18 February 2005	18 February 2008
C. B. Bhave	18 February 2008	18 February 2011
U. K. Sinha	18 February 2011	10 February 2017
Ajay Tyagi	10 February 2017	28 February 2022
Madhabi Puri Buch	1 March 2022	28 February 2025
Tuhin Kanta Pandey	1 March 2025	Incumbent

== Functions and responsibilities ==
The Preamble of the Securities and Exchange Board of India describes the basic functions of the Securities and Exchange Board of India as "...to protect the interests of investors in securities and to promote the development of, and to regulate the securities market and for matters connected there with or incidental there to".

SEBI has to be responsive to the needs of three groups, which constitute the market:

- issuers of securities
- investors
- market intermediaries

SEBI has three powers rolled into one body: quasi-legislative, quasi-judicial and quasi-executive. It drafts regulations in its legislative capacity, it conducts investigation and enforcement action in its executive function and it passes rulings and orders in its judicial capacity. Though this makes it very powerful, there is an appeal process to create accountability. There is a Securities Appellate Tribunal which is a three-member tribunal and is currently headed by Justice Tarun Agarwala, former Chief Justice of the Meghalaya High Court. A second appeal lies directly to the Supreme Court. SEBI has taken a very proactive role in streamlining disclosure requirements to international standards. In October 2025, SEBI issued a consultation paper proposing new incentives for retail investors in corporate bonds such as higher coupon rates or issue-price discounts for certain investor categories and recommended raising the threshold for High-Value Debt Listed Entities to ease compliance for issuers.

Securities and Exchange Board of India (SEBI)

=== Powers ===
For the discharge of its functions efficiently, SEBI has been vested with the following powers:

- to approve by−laws of Securities exchanges.
- to require the Securities exchange to amend their by−laws.
- inspect the books of accounts and call for periodical returns from recognised Securities exchanges.
- inspect the books of accounts of financial intermediaries.
- compel certain companies to list their shares in one or more Securities exchanges.
- registration of Brokers and sub-brokers.
- eliminate malpractices in security market.

SEBI committees

- Technical Advisory Committee
- Committee for review of structure of infrastructure institutions
- Advisory Committee for the SEBI Investor Protection and Education Fund
- Takeover Regulations Advisory Committee
- Primary Market Advisory Committee (PMAC)
- Secondary Market Advisory Committee (SMAC)
- Mutual Fund Advisory Committee
- Corporate Bonds & Securitisation Advisory Committee

There are two types of brokers:

- Discount brokers
- Merchant brokers

== Market reforms ==
It is credited for quick movement towards making the markets electronic and paperless by introducing the T+5 rolling cycle in July 2001, the T+3 in April 2002, and the T+2 in April 2003. The rolling cycle of T+2 means that settlement is done in 2 days after trade date. SEBI has also been active in setting up the regulations as required under law. It did away with physical certificates that were prone to postal delays, theft and forgery, apart from making the settlement process slow and cumbersome, by passing the Depositories Act, 1996.

SEBI has also been instrumental in taking quick and effective steps in light of the global meltdown and the Satyam fiasco. In October 2011, it increased the extent and quantity of disclosures to be made by Indian corporate promoters. In light of the global meltdown, it liberalized the takeover code to facilitate investments by removing regulatory structures. In one such move, SEBI has increased the application limit for retail investors to ₹200,000 (US$2,100) from ₹100,000 (US$1,100) at present.

On the occasion of World Investor Week 2022, SEBI Executive Director Shri G. P. Garg launched a book on Financial Literacy. This book is a joint effort between Metropolitan Stock Exchange of India Limited and CASI New York.

=== September 2026 board decisions ===
On 24 September 2026, the SEBI board approved an overhaul of the portfolio manager regulations. The changes include a Portfolio Managers Route for Investing in Mutual Fund Units (PRIM), under which portfolio managers may invest client funds in direct mutual fund schemes and specialised investment funds with a minimum ticket size of ₹25 lakh (US$27,000); a new category of "independent fund managers"; and permission to invest in initial public offerings and primary-market debt issuances. The board also allowed foreign portfolio investors to participate in physically settled non-agricultural commodity derivative contracts, approved changes to settlement proceedings, permitted real estate and infrastructure investment trusts to issue depository receipts in permissible overseas jurisdictions, and approved a common advertisement code for certain regulated entities.

== Criticism and controversies ==
=== Enforcement record ===
Several major financial scams have shaken the Indian market, like the Satyam scam, IL&FS crisis, Punjab National Bank Scam, and NSE co-location scam. Critics argue that SEBI failed to properly monitor these companies or take timely action when irregularities were noticed. There have been instances where market intermediaries engaged in fraudulent activities, which resulted in significant losses for investors. SEBI’s monitoring of these intermediaries has been called into question. SEBI has been criticized for its inability to effectively regulate and prevent insider trading, despite having regulations in place. There have been numerous cases where insider trading went undetected for long periods.

The Securities and Exchange Board of India (SEBI) has been criticized for not being able to effectively prevent market manipulation and pump and dump schemes. Reasons include limited resources, reliance on stock exchanges for market data, a lack of a comprehensive legal framework with stringent penalties, slow response times, and a lack of coordination with other regulatory bodies.

=== K. M. Abraham's letter ===
On 1 June 2011, SEBI whole-time member K. M. Abraham wrote a confidential letter to Prime Minister Manmohan Singh, alleging that Finance Minister Pranab Mukherjee and his advisor Omita Paul were exerting pressure on SEBI to take a lenient approach in certain investigations, including separate regulatory cases against Reliance Industries, Reliance ADAG Group, MCX, and Sahara Group. Abraham wrote in the letter that SEBI was "under duress and under severe attack from powerful corporate interests, operating concertedly to undermine SEBI" and that Mukherjee had an interest in the investigations.

Abraham's letter also alleged that Mukherjee and Paul compelled SEBI chairman U. K. Sinha to manage the Reliance Industries insider trading case and shield Reliance from a penalty of over ₹1,500 crore (US$321.39 million). According to news reports, Reliance was negotiating an out-of-court settlement with SEBI for a lower amount. In July 2011, despite a recommendation from the SEBI board to extend Abraham's tenure, he was transferred out of SEBI back to Kerala after the Ministry of Finance rejected SEBI's recommendation.

The Prime Minister's Office forwarded the letter to the Department of Economic Affairs, before it was leaked to the media in August 2011. Abraham stated that the leak had placed the lives of himself and his family at "grave risk". Sinha called Abraham's allegations "completely baseless, motivated and an attempt to tarnish the image of the government apart from being a malicious attack on me as chairman of SEBI", while the Ministry of Finance labelled them a "complete distortion of facts which are defamatory and devoid of truth". In August 2012, Manmohan Singh dismissed a complaint from Mukherjee to take action against Abraham and rejected all three misconduct charges against Abraham.

=== Petitions on SEBI appointments ===
Supreme Court of India heard a Public Interest Litigation (PIL) filed by India Rejuvenation Initiative that had challenged the procedure for key appointments adopted by Govt of India. The petition alleged that, "The constitution of the search-cum-selection committee for recommending the name of chairman and every whole-time members of SEBI for appointment has been altered, which directly impacted its balance and could compromise the role of the SEBI as a watchdog." On 21 November 2011, the court allowed petitioners to withdraw the petition and file a fresh petition pointing out constitutional issues regarding appointments of regulators and their independence. The Chief Justice of India refused the finance ministry's request to dismiss the PIL and said that the court was well aware of what was going on in SEBI. Hearing a similar petition filed by Bengaluru-based advocate Anil Kumar Agarwal, a two judge Supreme Court bench of Justice Surinder Singh Nijjar and Justice HL Gokhale issued a notice to the Govt of India, SEBI chief UK Sinha and Omita Paul, Secretary to the President of India.

=== Hindenburg allegations ===
In June 2024, SEBI issued a show cause notice to Hindenburg Research, a short-selling activist firm, over alleged trading violations in Adani Group shares. In response, Hindenburg labelled SEBI's notice as "nonsense" and an "attempt to silence and intimidate those who expose corruption and fraud perpetrated by the most powerful individuals in India". Hindenburg also stated that, "SEBI is corrupt and works 'hand in glove' with conglomerates like Adani to help it skirt regulations" and accused SEBI of pressuring brokers to close their short positions in Adani Group stocks to create a buying demand.

In August 2024, Hindenburg accused SEBI Chief Madhabi Puri Buch and her husband of having a stake in offshore entities which invested money into India. It alleged that these same funds, managed by IIFL Wealth, were used by Vinod Adani to artificially inflate shares of companies owned by the Adani Group. This put Buch into the spotlight, since SEBI had previously faced difficulties in finding out the beneficial owners of similar off-shore funds that had invested in Adani companies. Adani Group called the claims "malicious, mischievous". India's Leader of the Opposition in the Lok Sabha, Rahul Gandhi, asked Buch to resign.

In September 2024, around 1,000 employees of SEBI protested outside SEBI headquarters in Mumbai, demanding Buch's resignation, and raised the issue of a "toxic work culture" in a letter to the Ministry of Finance. Buch skipped a summons from the Public Accounts Committee citing personal reasons in October 2024, and did not resign until her three-year term ended in February 2025.

In September 2025, SEBI dismissed allegations against Adani Group pertaining to stock manipulation and siphoning of funds; however, analysts noted that SEBI sidestepped several other "key allegations" levelled by Hindenburg. In December 2025, SEBI dismissed a separate insider trading case against Pranav Adani and his relatives, who were accused of profiting from confidential information about an acquisition by Adani Green Energy. In May 2026, SEBI dismissed another disclosure case against NDTV, also owned by the Adani Group.

== Regional Securities exchanges ==
SEBI in its circular dated 30 May 2012 gave exit – guidelines for Securities exchanges. This was mainly due to illiquid nature of trade on many of 20+ regional Securities exchanges. It had asked many of these exchanges to either meet the required criteria or take a graceful exit. SEBI's new norms for Securities exchanges mandates that it should have minimum net-worth of ₹ 1 billion and an annual trading of ₹ 10 billion. The Indian Securities market regulator SEBI had given the recognized Securities exchanges two years to comply or exit the business.

SEBI is cracking down on virtual stock gaming apps popular among retail investors for creating virtual portfolios and competing on real-time stock prices.

In May, 2024 Sebi started to allow Foreign Portfolio Investors (FPIs) established in GIFT City to accept unlimited investments from Non-Resident Indians (NRIs) and Persons of Indian Origin (PIOs). After this initiative, NRIs could own 100% of a global fund set up at GIFT city which is a special economic zone in Gujarat.

=== Process of de-recognition and exit ===
Following is an excerpt from the circular:

1. Exchanges may seek exit through voluntary surrender of recognition.
2. Securities where the annual trading turnover on its own platform is less than ₹ 10 billion can apply to SEBI for voluntary surrender of recognition and exit, at any time before the expiry of two years from the date of issuance of this Circular.
3. If the Securities exchange is not able to achieve the prescribed turnover of ₹ 10 billion on continuous basis or does not apply for voluntary surrender of recognition and exit before the expiry of two years from the date of this Circular, SEBI shall proceed with compulsory de-recognition and exit of such Securities exchanges, in terms of the conditions as may be specified by SEBI.
4. Securities Exchanges which are already de-recognised as on date, shall make an application for exit within two months from the date of this circular. Upon failure to do so, the de-recognised exchange shall be subject to compulsory exit process.

== See also ==
- Forward Markets Commission
- Institute of Chartered Accountants of India
- Institute of Company Secretaries of India
- List of financial supervisory authorities by country
- Securities commission
- Securities exchange
- National Institute of Securities Markets
