= Finance Commission =

Agency in India

Sixteenth Finance Commission of India
- Vitta Āyoga
- Logo of the Finance Commission of India

Commission overview
- Formed: 22 November 1951; 74 years ago
- Jurisdiction: Government of India
- Headquarters: New Delhi
- Commission executives: Arvind Panagariya, (Chairman); Ajay Narayan Jha, (Member); Annie George Mathew, (Member); Dr.Manoj Panda, (Member); Soumya Kanti Ghosh, (Part- Member); Ritvik Ranjanam Pandey, IAS, (Secretary)
- Website: fincomindia.nic.in

The Finance Commissions (IAST: Vitta Jayga) are commissions periodically constituted by the President of India under Article 280 of the Indian Constitution to define the financial relations between the central government of India and the individual state governments. The First Commission was established in 1951 under The Finance Commission (Miscellaneous Provisions) Act, 1951. Fifteen Finance Commissions have been constituted since the promulgation of Indian Constitution in 1950. Individual commissions operate under the terms of reference which are different for every commission, and they define the terms of qualification, appointment and disqualification, the term, eligibility and powers of the Finance Commission. As per the constitution, the commission is appointed every five years and consists of a chairman and four other members.

The most recent Finance Commission was constituted on 31 December 2023 and is chaired by Arvind Panagariya former Vice Chairman of NITI Aayog.

== History ==
As a federal nation, India suffers from both vertical and horizontal fiscal imbalances. Vertical imbalances between the central and state governments result from states incurring expenditures disproportionate to their sources of revenue, in the process of fulfilling their responsibilities. However, states are better able to gauge the needs and concerns of their inhabitants and therefore more efficient at addressing them. Horizontal imbalances among state governments result from differing historical backgrounds or resource endowments and can widen over time.

Several provisions to bridge the fiscal gap between the centre and the states were already enshrined in the Constitution of India, including Article 268, which facilitates the levy of duties by the centre but equips the States to collect and retain the same. Similarly, Articles 269, 270, 275, 282 and 293, among others, specify ways and means of sharing resources between the Union and States. The Finance Commission recommends how net tax proceeds are distributed between the Union and the states, the principles governing grants-in-aid to state revenues, and measures to augment the Consolidated Fund of a state for panchayats and municipalities.

Article 280 of the Constitution of India

Article 280 of the Indian Constitution defines the scope of the commission:

1. The President will constitute a finance commission within two years from the commencement of the Constitution and thereafter at the end of every fifth year or earlier, as deemed necessary by him/her, which shall include a chairman and four other members.
2. Parliament may by law determine the requisite qualifications for appointment as members of the commission and the procedure of selection.
3. The commission is constituted to make recommendations to the president about the distribution of the net proceeds of taxes between the Union and States and also the allocation of the same among the States themselves. It is also under the ambit of the finance commission to define the financial relations between the Union and the States. They also deal with the devolution of unplanned revenue resources.

== Functions ==
1. Distribution of 'net proceeds' of taxes between Center and the States, to be divided as per their respective contributions to the taxes.
2. Determine factors governing Grants-in-Aid to the states and the magnitude of the same.
3. To make recommendations to the president as to the measures needed to augment the Fund of a State to supplement the resources of the panchayats and municipalities in the state on the basis of the recommendations made by the finance commission of the state.
4. Any other matter related to it by the president in the interest of sound finance.

== The Finance Commission (Miscellaneous Provisions) Act, 1951 ==
The Finance Commission (Miscellaneous Provisions) Act, 1951 was passed to give a structured format to the finance commission and to bring it to par with world standards, by laying down rules for the qualification and disqualification of members of the commission, and for their appointment, term, eligibility and powers.

=== Qualifications of the members ===
The chairman of a finance commission is selected from people with experience of public affairs. The other four members are selected from people who:

1. Are, or have been, or are qualified, as judges of a high court; or
2. Have knowledge of government finances or accounts; or
3. Have had experience in administration and financial expertise; or
4. Have special knowledge of economics

=== Disqualification from being a member of the commission ===
A member may be disqualified if:

1. He is mentally unsound; and as follows-
2. He is an undischarged insolvent;
3. He has been convicted of an immoral offence;
4. His financial and other interests are such that it hinders the smooth functioning of the commission.

=== Terms of office of members and eligibility for reappointment ===
Every member will be in office for the time period as specified in the order of the President, but is eligible for reappointment provided he has, by means of a letter addressed to the president, resigned his office.

=== Salaries and allowances of the members ===
The members of the commission shall provide full-time or part-time service to the commission, as the President specifies in his order. The members shall be paid salaries and allowances as per the provisions made by the Central Government.

== List of Finance Commissions ==
So far 15 Finance Commissions have been appointed which are as follows:

Finance Commission	Year of establishment	Chairman	Operational duration
First	1951	K. C. Neogy	1952–57
Second	1956	K. Santhanam	1957–62
Third	1960	A. K. Chanda	1962–66
Fourth	1964	P. V. Rajamannar	1966–69
Fifth	1968	Mahavir Tyagi	1969–74
Sixth	1972	K. Brahmananda Reddy	1974–79
Seventh	1977	J. M. Shelat	1979–84
Eighth	1983	Y. B. Chavan	1984–89
Ninth	1987	N. K. P. Salve	1989–95
Tenth	1992	K. C. Pant	1995–00
Eleventh	1998	A. M. Khusro	2000–05
Twelfth	2002	C. Rangarajan	2005–10
Thirteenth	2007	Dr. Vijay L. Kelkar	2010–15
Fourteenth	2013	Dr. Y. V Reddy	2015–20
Fifteenth	2017	N. K. Singh	2020-21; 2021-26
Sixteenth	2023	Arvind Panagariya	2026 - 31

=== 14th Finance Commission ===
Major Recommendations of 14th Finance Commission headed by Prof. Y V Reddy

1. The share of states in the net proceeds of the shareable Central taxes should be 42%. This is 10 percentage points higher than the recommendation of 13th Finance Commission.
2. Revenue deficit to be progressively reduced and eliminated.
3. Fiscal deficit to be reduced to 3% of the GDP by 2017–18.
4. A target of 62% of GDP for the combined debt of centre and states.
5. The Medium Term Fiscal Plan (MTFP) should be reformed and made the statement of commitment rather than a statement of intent.
6. FRBM Act needs to be amended to mention the nature of stocks which shall require targets relaxation.
7. Both centre and states should conclude 'Grand Bargain' to implement the model Goods and Services Act (GST).
8. Initiatives to reduce the number of Central Sponsored Schemes (CSS) and to restore the predominance of formula-based plan grants.
9. States need to address the problem of losses in the power sector in time bound manner.

=== 15th Finance Commission ===
The Fifteenth Finance Commission was constituted by the Government of India, after the approval from the President of India, through a notification in the Gazette of India in November 2017. Nand Kishore Singh was appointed as the commission's chairman, with its full-time members being Shaktikanta Das and Anoop Singh and its part-time members being Ramesh Chand and Ashok Lahiri. However Ajay Narayan Jha was appointed replacing Shaktikanta Das who resigned from the commission to serve as the governor of the Reserve Bank of India.

The commission was set up to give recommendations for five years commencing on 1 April 2020. The main tasks of the commission were to "strengthen cooperative federalism, improve the quality of public spending and help protect fiscal stability". Some newspapers like The Hindu and The Economic Times noted that commission's job was harder because of the rollout of goods and service tax (GST), as, it had taken certain powers related to taxation away from states and the Union and had given it to the GST Council.

== Finance Commission allocation ==
First Finance Commission proposed, the percentage share of net proceeds of income-tax assigned to the states should be following manner:

First Finance commission 1952
State	% of share
Bombay	17.5
Uttar Pradesh	15.75
Madras	15.25
West Bengal	11.2
Bihar	9.75
Madhya Pradesh	5.25
Hyderabad	4.5
Odisha	3.5
Rajasthan	3.5
Punjab	3.25
Travancore-Cochin	2.5
Assam	2.25
Madhya Bharat	1.75
Saurashtra	1
PEPSU	0.75

- 2nd Finance Commission 1957, 3rd Finance Commission 1961, 4th Finance Commission 1965 and 5th Finance Commission 1969

State	2nd FC % of share	3rd FC % of share	4th FC % of share	5th FC % of share
Uttar Pradesh	16.36	14.42	14.6	16.01
Bombay	15.97	13.41	14.28	11.4
West Bengal	10.09	12.09	10.91	9.11
Bihar	9.94	9.73	9.03	9.99
Madras	8.4	8.13	8.34	8.18
Andhra Pradesh	8.12	7.71	7.34	8.01
Madhya Pradesh	6.42	6.41	6.47	7.09
Mysore	5.14	5.13	5.14	5.4
Gujarat		4.78	5.29	5.13
Punjab	4.24	4.49	4.36	2.55
Rajasthan	4.09	3.97	3.97	4.34
Odisha	3.73	3.44	3.4	3.75
Kerala	3.64	3.35	3.59	3.83
Assam	2.44	2.44	2.44	2.67
Jammu & Kashmir	1.08	0.7	0.73	0.79
Haryana				1.73
Union Territory	1	3	2.5	2.6
Nagaland			0.07	0.08

- 6th Finance Commission 1973, 7th Finance Commission 1978, 8th Finance Commission 1984 and 9th Finance Commission 1990

State	6th Fin. Com. % of share	7th Fin. com. % of share	8th Fin. Com. % of share	9th Fin. Com. % of share
Uttar Pradesh	15.23	15.42	17.907	16.786
Maharashtra	11.05	10.95	8.392	8.191
Bihar	9.61	9.53	12.08	12.418
West Bengal	8.89	8.015	7.8	7.976
Tamilnadu	7.94	8.05	7.565	7.931
Andhra Pradesh	7.76	8.021	8.187	8.208
Madhya Pradesh	7.3	7.35	8.378	8.185
Gujarat	5.55	5.96	4.049	4.55
Karnataka	5.33	5.44	4.979	4.928
Rajasthan	4.5	4.362	4.545	4.836
Kerala	3.92	3.95	3.76	3.729
Odisha	3.73	3.738	4.202	4.326
Punjab	2.75	2.73	1.744	1.706
Assam	2.54	2.52	2.879	2.631
Haryana	1.77	1.819	1.074	1.224
Jammu Kashmir	0.81	0.818	0.838	0.695
Himachal Pradesh	0.6	0.595	0.555	0.595
Tripura	0.27	0.26	0.269	0.303
Manipur	0.18	0.19	0.22	0.171
Meghalaya	0.18	0.18	0.184	0.208
Goa	NA	NA	NA	0.11
Nagaland	0.09	0.085	0.088	0.096
Mizoram	NA	NA	NA	0.073
Sikkim	NA	0.035	0.035	0.03

- 10th Finance Commission 1995, 11th Finance Commission, 12th Finance Commission, 13th Finance Commission, 14th Finance Commission and 15th Finance Commission

State	10th FC %	11th FC %	12th FC %	13th FC %	14th FC %	15th FC %
Andhra Pradesh	8.465	7.701	7.36	6.937	4.305	4.047
Arunachala pradesh		0.244		0.328	1.37	1.757
Assam	2.784	3.285	3.24	3.628	3.311	3.128
Bihar	12.861	14.597	11.03	10.917	9.665	10.058
Chhattisgarh			2.65	2.47	3.08	3.407
Goa	0.18	0.206		0.266	0.378	0.386
Gujarat	4.406	2.821	3.57	3.041	3.084	3.478
Haryana	1.238	0.944	1.08	1.048	1.084	1.093
Himachal Pradesh	0.704	0.683	0.52	0.781	0.713	0.83
Jammu & Kashmir	1.097	1.29		1.551	1.854	
Jharkhand			3.36	2.802	3.139	3.307
Karnataka	5.339	4.93	4.46	4.328	4.713	3.647
Kerala	3.839	3.057	2.67	2.341	2.5	1.925
Madhya Pradesh	8.29	8.838	6.71	7.12	7.548	7.85
Maharashtra	8.126	4.632	5	5.199	5.521	6.317
Manipur	0.282	0.366		0.451	0.617	0.716
Meghalaya	0.283	0.342		0.408	0.642	0.767
Mizoram	0.149	0.198		0.269	0.46	0.5
Nagaland	0.181	0.22		0.314	0.498	0.569
Odisha	4.495	5.056	5.16	4.779	4.642	4.528
Punjab	1.461	1.147	1.3	1.389	1.577	1.807
Rajasthan	5.551	5.473	5.61	5.853	5.495	6.026
Sikkim	0.126	0.184		0.239	0.367	0.388
Tamil Nadu	6.637	5.385	5.31	4.969	4.023	4.079
Telangana					2.437	2.102
Tripura	0.378	0.487		0.511	0.642	0.708
Uttar Pradesh	17.811	19.798	19.26	19.677	17.959	17.939
Uttarakhand				1.12	1.052	1.118
West Bengal	7.471	8.116	7.06	7.264	7.324	7.523

== See also ==
- Part One of the Constitution of India
- Fiscal Responsibility and Budget Management Act, 2003
