= Thirteenth Finance Commission =

2007 finance commission of India

The Thirteenth Finance Commission of India was constituted by the President of India under the chairmanship of Vijay L. Kelkar on 13 November 2007.

== Members ==
Members of the Commission were:

- Dr. Vijay L. Kelkar, Chairman
- Shri B. K. Chaturvedi, Part-time
- Dr. Indira Rajaraman
- Prof. Atul Sarma
- Dr. Sanjiv Misra
- Shri Sumit Bose, Secretary

== Recommendations ==
The major recommendations of the Commission were:

1. The share of states in the net proceeds of the shareable Central taxes should be 32%. This is 1.5 percentage-points higher than the recommendation of the 12th Commission.
2. Revenue deficit to be progressively reduced and eliminated, followed by revenue surplus by 2013–2014.
3. Fiscal deficit to be reduced to 3% of the gross domestic product (GDP) by 2014–2015.
4. A target of 68% of GDP for the combined debt of centre and states.
5. The Medium Term Fiscal Plan (MTFP) should be reformed and made the statement of commitment rather than a statement of intent.
6. Fiscal Responsibility and Budget Management Act, 2003 need to be amended to mention the nature of shocks which shall require targets relaxation.
7. Both centre and states should conclude 'Grand Bargain' to implement the model Goods and Services Act (GST).(Task force recommended single positive GST rate of 12% comprising 5% CGST and 7% SGST ) To incentivise the states, the commission recommended a sanction of the grant of Rs500 billion.
8. Initiatives to reduce the number of Central Sponsored Schemes (CSS) and to restore the predominance of formula-based plan grants.
9. States need to address the problem of losses in the power sector in time bound manner.
