= Financial Sector Legislative Reforms Commission =

The Financial Sector Legislative Reforms Commission (FSLRC) is a body set up by the Government of India, Ministry of Finance, on 24 March 2011, to review and rewrite the legal-institutional architecture of the Indian financial sector. This Commission is chaired by a former Judge of the Supreme Court of India, Justice B. N. Srikrishna and has an eclectic mix of expert members drawn from the fields of finance, economics, public administration, law etc.

Based on substantive research, extensive deliberations in the Commission and in its Working Groups, interaction with policy makers, regulators, experts and stakeholders; the Commission has evolved a tentative framework on the legal–institutional structure required for the Indian financial sector in the medium to the long run. The broad contour of that framework is outlined in the paper released by the Commission on 4 October 2012.

Based on further feedback on the proposals from stakeholders and deliberations thereon, the FSLRC proposes to complete its Report by March 2013.

== Context ==
The Financial Sector Legislative Reforms Commission (FSLRC) was constituted by the Government of India, Ministry of Finance, vide a resolution dated 24 March 2011. The setting up of the FSLRC was the result of a felt need that the legal and institutional structures of the financial sector in India need to be reviewed and recast in tune with the contemporary requirements of the sector.

The institutional framework governing the financial sector has been built up over a century. There are over 60 Acts and multiple rules and regulations that govern the financial sector. Many of the financial sector laws date back several decades, when the financial landscape was very different from that seen today. For example, the RBI Act and the Insurance Act are of 1934 and 1938 vintage respectively. The Securities Contract Regulation Act was enacted in 1956, when derivatives and statutory regulators were unknown. The superstructure of the financial sector governance regime has been modified in a piecemeal fashion from time to time, without substantial changes to the underlying foundations. These piecemeal changes have induced complex and cumbersome legislation, and raised difficulties in harmonising contradictory provisions. Such harmonisation is imperative for effectively regulating a dynamic market in the era of financial globalisation.

The piecemeal amendments have generated unintended outcomes including regulatory gaps, overlaps, inconsistencies and regulatory arbitrage. The fragmented regulatory architecture has led to a loss of scale and scope that could be available from a seamless financial market with all its attendant benefits of minimising the intermediation cost. For instance, complex financial intermediation by financial conglomerates of today falls under the purview of multiple regulators with gaps and overlaps. A number of expert committees have pointed out these discrepancies, and recommended the need for revisiting the financial sector legislations to rectify them. The need for complete review of the existing financial sector laws has been underlined to make the Indian financial sector more vibrant and dynamic in an increasingly interconnected world.

The remit of FSLRC, as contained in its Terms of Reference (ToR), comprises the following:

1. Review, simplify and rewrite the legislations affecting the financial markets in India, focusing on broad principles.
2. Evolve a common set of principles for governance of financial sector regulatory institutions.
3. Remove inconsistencies and uncertainties in legislations/Rules and Regulations.
4. Make legislations consistent with each other.
5. Make legislations dynamic to automatically bring them in tune with the changing financial landscape.
6. Streamline the regulatory architecture of financial markets.

The FSLRC has been deliberating on these issues since April 2011 both internally and through consultation/interaction with a wide spectrum of experts and stakeholders. This Approach Paper is the outcome of these deliberations and substantive research work. It shows the contours of the legal-institutional framework that the FSLRC may recommend. It is a provisional document, and the thinking of FSLRC will evolve in coming months, utilising various inputs including the analysis of this document in the public domain.

== Terms of Reference and objectives ==
The Terms of Reference of the Commission include the following:

1. Examining the architecture of the legislative and regulatory system governing the Financial sector in India
2. Examine if legislation should mandate statement of principles of legislative intent behind every piece of subordinate legislation in order to make the purposive intent of the legislation clear and transparent to users of the law and to the Courts.
3. Examine if public feedback for draft subordinate legislation should be made mandatory, with exception for emergency measures.
4. Examine prescription of parameters for invocation of emergency powers where regulatory action may be taken on ex parte basis.
5. Examine the interplay of exchange controls under FEMA and FDI Policy with other regulatory regimes within the financial sector.
6. Examine the most appropriate means of oversight over regulators and their autonomy from government.
7. Examine the need for re-statement of the law and immediate repeal of any out-dated legislation on the basis of judicial decisions and policy shifts in the last two decades of the financial sector post-liberalisation.
8. Examination of issues of data privacy and protection of consumer of financial services in the Indian market.
9. Examination of legislation relating to the role of information technology in the delivery of financial services in India, and their effectiveness.
10. Examination of all recommendations already made by various expert committees set up by the government and by regulators and to implement measures that can be easily accepted.
11. Examine the role of state governments and legislatures in ensuring a smooth interstate financial services infrastructure in India.
12. Examination of any other related issues.

== Members ==
=== Commission ===
Name	Position	Profile
Justice (Retd.) B. N. Srikrishna	Chairman	Justice Srikrishna is a former judge of the Supreme Court of India (2002–2006), Chief Justice of the Kerala High Court and judge of the Bombay High Court. Post-retirement, among other positions, he has been chairman, Sixth Pay Commission of the Government of India and chairman, Committee for Separate Telangana before taking over as chairman, FSLRC. Justice Srikrishna holds an LL.B. and LL.M., a master's degree in Sanskrit and is proficient in 11 languages.
Dr. P.J. Nayak	Member	Dr. Nayak is currently the managing director and country head of Morgan Stanley India. From 2000 to 2009 he was the chairman and managing director of Axis Bank, a domestic commercial bank. Earlier, between 1971 and 1996, he worked as a civil servant, and was an officer of the Indian Administrative Service. Between 1990 and 1995 he worked in the Department of Economic Affairs in the Ministry of Finance. Dr. Nayak has an MA and PhD in economics from Cambridge University.
Justice (Retd.) Dr. Debi Prasad Pal	Member	Dr. Pal is a senior advocate, practicing in the Supreme Court of India and in different High Courts in India. He is a former Minister of State for Finance and a former judge of the Calcutta High Court. Dr. Pal is a three-time former Member of Parliament, chairman of standing committees of Parliament and a member of The Tenth Finance Commission of India. He holds a D.Litt. in political economy and a Doctor of Law.
Smt. K.J. Udeshi	Member	Smt. Udeshi joined the Reserve Bank of India in 1965 and was appointed as the first woman deputy governor in 2003. She retired from the RBI in October 2005 and has been chairperson of the Banking Codes and Standards Board of India till recently. Smt. Udeshi is a post-graduate in economics.
Shri Yezdi H.Malegam	Member	Shri Malegam is a chartered accountant of international repute. He has been president of the Institute of Chartered Accountants of India, chairman of the National Advisory Committee on Accounting Standards, and is a board member of the Reserve Bank of India for the last 17 years.
Prof. Jayant R Varma	Member	Prof. Varma is currently professor of finance and accounting in the Indian Institute of Management, Ahmedabad. He has a doctorate in management, apart from being a qualified cost accountant. Prof. Varma was a full-time member of the Securities and Exchange Board of India and has been part of several committees set up by SEBI, Forward Markets Commission, Ministry of Finance and Corporate Affairs.
Prof. M. Govinda Rao	Member	Currently director of the National Institute of Public Finance and Policy, Dr. Rao is an eminent public finance expert. He is also a member of the Economic Advisory Council to the Prime Minister of India. In the past he held the positions of Director, Institute for Social and Economic Change, fellow in the Australian National University, economic advisor to Finance Commission etc.
Late Shri C. Achuthan	Member (till 19 September 2011)	Late Shri Achuthan was an eminent legal expert and was the first presiding officer of the Securities Appellate Tribunal (SAT). He was in the board of SEBI, legal adviser in the Ministry of Law and has been chairman / member of number of committees in the financial / corporate sectors.
Shri Dhirendra Swarup	Member Convenor	Shri Swarup, a former civil servant, was secretary (expenditure) and chief budget officer of the Government of India. Thereafter, he was the first chairman of the Pension Fund Regulatory and Development Authority (PFRDA). He was also a nominee director in the Securities and Exchange Board of India SEBI.
Shri C K G Nair	Secretary, FSLRC	Shri Nair is an officer of the Indian Economic Service with 26 years of experience in the areas of industry, transport and finance. Working in the ministries of Consumer Affairs and Finance, he played a significant role in the policy and institutional restructuring of commodity futures market, capital markets and consumer protection in the last 10 years.

=== Working groups ===
Due to the scope and depth of research required for the completion of this project, certain sectors were singled out and dedicated working groups (WGs) were created for in-depth analysis. These WGs consisted of sector experts who created their own report with relevant recommendations which were submitted to the Commission.

==== WG on Banking ====
Name	Position
Smt K J Udeshi	Chairperson
Shri YH Malegam	Member
Shri Janmejeya Sinha	Member
Shri Aditya Puri	Member
Ms Naina Lal Kidwai	Member
Shri Rajiv Lall	Member
Shri Harsh Vardhan	Member
Shri M G Bhide	Member

==== WG on Insurance, Pensions and Small Savings ====
Name	Position
Shri Dhirendra Swarup	Chairman
Shri CS Rao	Senior Advisor (Former Chairman IRDA)
Shri Tarun Bajaj	Member
Ms Anuradha Prasad	Member
Shri VS Chauhan	Member

==== WG on Payments ====
Member	Position	Profile
Dr. PJ Nayak	Chairman	Managing director and country head of Morgan Stanley India
Shri Ranjit Tinaikar	Member	Partner, Mckinsey
Shri Uttam Nayak	Member	Country manager, VISA
Shri Bharat Poddar	Member	Group head, BCG
Shri AP Singh	Member	JS UIADI
Shri Abhishek Sinha	Member	CEO, EKO

==== WG on Public Debt Management ====
Name	Position
Dr Govinda Rao	Chairman
Shri Dhirendra Swarup	Member
Shri Kanagasabapathy Kuppuswamy	Member

==== WG on Securities ====
Name	Position
Prof Jayanth Verma	Chairman
Shri Ravi Narain	Member
Shri Madhu Kannan	Member
Shri Neeraj Gambhir	Member
Shri Jayesh Mehta	Member
Shri SA Narayan	Member
Prof KG Sahadevan	Member

=== Research Team ===
The Commission is supported by expert consultants in the fields of economics, finance, law and related areas. They include Prof. Ajay Shah, Prof. Ila Patnaik, Prof. Sundar Korivi and their team members from National Institute of Public Finance and Policy and National Institute of Securities Markets respectively; Shri Somasekhar Sundaresan, Shri Bobby Parikh, and Shri Rajshekhar Rao.

== Proposals ==
The mandate of FSLRC not only includes recommendations for a complete redesign of the Financial sector of India, but also the legislation itself. The Commission strongly believes in the approach of writing 'principle based' legislation that would articulate broad principles which do not vary with financial or technological innovation. Regulators will write subordinated legislation which could either utilise detailed prescriptive rules or be principles-based, depending on the situation and the judgment of the regulator. This combination of legislation and subordinated legislation should yield a body of law that evolves smoothly over time.

This approach also substantively improves the compliance culture. Under rules-based regulation, there is the risk that financial firms set up complex harmful structures that comply with the letter of the rules. The Commission would want laws to hold financial firms to a higher standard: that of complying with the principles.

The approach paper emphasizes the following:

- A uniform legal process for the financial sector regulators emphasizing rule of law.
- A well-articulated principles-based approach to primary legislation emphasising a sound body of subordinate legislation based on these laws.
- Statutorily empowered, independent regulators with clear goals, powers and accountability.
- Removing twilight zones in the financial sector: every entity operating in the financial space needs to be on the radar of a financial regulator.
- Focusing on consumer protection- This is the ultimate objective of financial sector regulation as regulation per se is not an objective. Consumer protection has two components; prevention and cure. While financial regulators will address the former, the proposed financial redressal agency (FRA) spanning across the financial sector will deal with the latter addressing financial consumer grievances. A feed-back loop from the FRA to the regulators will help the latter in systemically addressing consumer grievances by appropriate regulations.
- A resolution mechanism to address failure of financial firms and to protect consumers, including management of the deposit insurance scheme.
- Ownership neutrality and competition.
- Moving away from the sectoral approach to regulation
- A framework for addressing systemic risk, financial sector development, coordination.

=== Proposed Architecture ===
The model of the proposed regulatory architecture will comprise the following agencies:

1. The central bank as the monetary authority, banking regulator and payment system regulator.
2. A unified regulator for the rest of the financial sector.
3. A deposit insurance-cum-resolution agency.
4. A public debt management agency.
5. A financial redressal agency.
6. A financial sector appellate tribunal.
7. A mechanism for coordination, systemic risk, financial development and other issues where the role of multiple agencies are involved (FSDC/similar to FSDC).

At a conceptual level, it is proposed that RBI will perform three functions: monetary policy, regulation and supervision of banking in enforcing the proposed consumer protection law and the proposed micro-prudential law, and regulation and supervision of payment systems in enforcing these two laws. In order to minimise conflicts of interest across these three fields, and to develop specialised skills, the Commission will recommend that the three functions be performed by distinct boards which oversee the three areas of work of monetary policy, payments regulation and supervision, and banking regulation and supervision.

The unified financial regulatory agency, which would deal with all financial firms other than banking and payments, would yield benefits in terms of economies of scope and scale in the financial system; it would reduce the identification of the regulatory agency with one sector; it would help address the difficulties of finding the appropriate talent in government agencies. This proposed unified financial regulatory agency would also take over the work on organised financial trading from RBI in the areas connected with the Bond-Currency-Derivatives Nexus, and from fmc for commodity futures, thus giving a unification of all organised financial trading including equities, government bonds, currencies, commodity futures, corporate bonds, etc. The unification of regulation and supervision of financial firms such as mutual funds, insurance companies, and a diverse array of firms which are not banks or payment providers, would yield consistent treatment in consumer protection and micro-prudential regulation across all of them.

The present SAT will be subsumed in FSAT, which will hear appeals against RBI for its regulatory functions, the unified financial agency, decisions of the Financial Redressal Agency (FRA) and some elements of the work of the resolution corporation.

The present DICGC will be subsumed into the Resolution Corporation which will work across the financial system.

The Financial Redressal Agency (FRA) is a new agency which will have to be created in implementing this financial regulatory architecture. It will set up a nationwide machinery to become a one stop shop where consumers can carry complaints against all financial firms.

An independent debt management office is envisioned.

Finally, the existing FSDC will have modified functions in the fields of systemic risk and development.

=== Regulatory Governance ===
A critical pillar of financial law is the construction of independent regulators and their functioning. Hence, FSLRC analysed the governance puzzles of establishing sound independent regulators, which involves the twin goals of independence and accountability.

==== Independence of Regulators ====
Turning to the issue of independence, there are four arguments in favour of independence:

1. The regulator is able to set up a specialised workforce that has superior technical knowledge.
2. This is assisted by modified human resource and other processes, when compared with the functioning of mainstream government departments.
3. With such knowledge, and close observation of the industry, an independent regulator is able to move rapidly in modifying regulations, thus giving malleability to laws.
4. The presence of independent regulators improves legal certainty.

At the same time, independence cannot be given to an agency in isolation. Parliament should not delegate power to unelected officials without adequate accountability mechanisms. New channels of accountability need to be constructed as independent agencies are not subject to accountability through elections. An example of accountability is found with central banks worldwide: when lawmakers gave central banks independence, in most cases, they placed the burden upon central banks to deliver on an inflation target. This was the accountability mechanism through which the independent agency was brought under check. In most other areas of financial law, the accountability mechanisms required are much more complex.

FSLRC promises to endeavour to find a judicious middle road which combines appropriate levels of independence achieved through concrete mechanisms in the law, coupled with an array of accountability mechanisms, through which sound outcomes will come about under Indian conditions. This will yield substantial gains for the Indian economy when compared with the present arrangements.

==== Accountability of Regulators ====
As argued above, regulatory independence is desirable so as to support the functioning of the regulator as an expert body, and to ensure that rule-making and enforcement of rules does not fluctuate with changes in political executives. But independence is not an unmixed blessing: when unelected officials are given power, this needs to be accompanied by accountability mechanisms. FSLRC will pursue all four pathways to accountability:

1. Avoid conflicting objectives: When a government agency has multiple objectives, it is easier for the agency to explain away failure. This problem is heightened when there are conflicts of interest. It is, hence, desirable to structure regulatory bodies with clarity of purpose and the absence of conflicting objectives. This perspective has shaped the thinking of fslrc on the financial regulatory architecture.
2. A well structured rule-making process: Public choice theory teaches us that regulators may sometimes draft regulations that are convenient for the regulator rather than the larger national interest. A well structured rule-making process will introduce checks and balances that will avoid suboptimal outcomes. To ensure that the benefits of the regulations out weigh the costs, for every proposed regulation there should be:
  1. A compact statement of the objects and reasons of the subordinate legislation;
  2. A description of the market outcome which is an inefficient one ("a market failure" in Economics parlance);
  3. Demonstration that solving this market failure is within the objectives of the regulator;
  4. Clear and precise exposition of the proposed intervention;
  5. Demonstration that the proposed intervention is within the powers of the regulator;
  6. Demonstration that the proposed intervention would address the identified market failure;
  7. Demonstration that the costs to society through complying with the intervention are outweighed by the gains to society from addressing the market failure.

This will help ensure that adequate analysis has preceded rule-making, and show the full regulatory intent to citizens and judges. This will be followed by a consultative process where market participants will be given sufficient time and information to understand the regulation and comment on it.

One key element of the rule-making process is appeal. When an independent regulator comes into being through a well drafted law, this law contains specific objectives and specific powers. If the regulator strays from either of these – catering to objectives that were not specified in the law, or claiming powers that were not mentioned in the law – it should be possible to strike down the regulation through appeal.

3. The rule of law: A crucial element of accountability and independence of regulators is three core principles of the rule of law:
  1. Laws should be known before an action takes place.
  2. Laws should be applied uniformly across similar situations.
  3. Every application of law should provide the private party with the information for application of the law, the reasoning by which the conclusion was arrived at, and a mechanism for appeal.

The Commission believes that a formal and transparent system of regulation, rooted in the rule of law, encourages entry of new financial service providers and thereby reduces costs and financial exclusion.

4. Reporting: Once the objectives of an agency have been defined, it is meaningful to ask the agency to report – e.g. in the Annual Report – the extent to which it has achieved these objectives. Each agency should report on how it has fared on pursuing its desired outcomes, and at what cost.

=== Role of financial law ===
Regulation is not an end in itself; it exists in order to address market failures. Laws must be defined in terms of their economic purpose, rather than in terms of the powers conferred upon regulatory agencies or the entities who are affected by the law. This clarity on objectives is essential for obtaining accountability. If an agency is given the objective of 'regulation', then accountability is lost because the agency will always be able to demonstrate that it has, indeed, done regulation.

==== Consumer Protection ====
The first objective of financial regulation is consumer protection. The existing strategy on consumer protection in Indian finance is primarily focused on a caveat emptor doctrine, where consumers are protected from fraud, and there is a program to ensure full disclosure. For the rest consumers are left to their own devices.

Consumers of financial services are often more vulnerable than consumers of ordinary goods and require a special effort by the State. The present body of financial law is not animated by consumer protection. The Commission believes this is a major gap in Indian financial law and regulation, which needs to be addressed.

FSLRC proposes a unified consumer protection law which would contain three components: an enumerated set of rights and protections for consumers, an enumerated set of powers, and principles that guide what power should be used under what circumstances. The details of consumer protection would, of course, lie in the subordinated legislation that financial regulators would draft. As an example, whether or not loads and other conflicted remuneration structures should be banned is a question that would be addressed by the regulator. The proposed law will clearly pose this question to the regulator. The regulators would then utilise the powers provided to pursue the goals specified in the law, through subordinated legislation which would evolve over the years reflecting financial innovation, technological change, and the changing nature of the Indian economy. Alongside this rule-making mandate, there would be a supervisory function to ensure compliance with these rules.

In India, so far, the financial regulatory structure has been defined by sector, with multiple laws and often multiple agencies covering various sectors. This has led to inconsistent treatment, and regulatory arbitrage. Regulators of a sector have sometimes adopted the perspective of the industry, and opted for lax regulation as a path to growth of the industry. These problems would be reduced by having a single principles-based law which would cover the entire financial system. It is, then, likely that consumers would be treated fairly with consistent treatment across all aspects of their engagement of the financial system.

FSLRC will propose the creation of a unified Financial Redressal Agency (FRA). FRA would have front-ends in every district of India, where consumers of all financial products would be able to submit complaints. Modern technology would be used to connect up these front-ends into a centralised light-weight adjudication process. A well structured workflow process would support speedy and fair handling of cases. Consumers would deal only with FRA when they have grievances in any financial activity: they would not have to deal with multiple regulators.

==== Micro-prudential Regulation ====
This is the efforts by financial regulators to reduce the probability that a financial firm collapses. The motivation for micro-prudential regulation is rooted in consumer protection. When a consumer deals with (say) an insurance company, there should be a very high probability that the insurance company will be solvent and able to discharge on its promises. In addition, if a large number of financial firms fail at the same time, this can disrupt the overall financial system. Sound micro-prudential regulation thus caters to reducing systemic risk.

As with the field of consumer protection, the law that FSLRC will propose will have enumerated objectives, enumerated powers and principles that guide the use of the power. The main objective would be to reduce the probability of failure of financial firms, but this will be balanced with a principle that requires the regulator to consider the consequences for efficiency. The regulators will have the powers to impose requirements around capital adequacy, corporate governance standards, liquidity norms, investment norms, and other instruments. The principle of proportionality will apply: regulatory interventions should be related to the risks faced.

A single micro-prudential law will govern the entire financial system, thus ensuring uniform treatment of all aspects of the financial system, and largely eliminating areas of regulatory arbitrage. Multiple regulators may enforce the law for various components of the financial system.

==== Resolution ====
Sound micro-prudential regulation will reduce the probability of firm failure. However, eliminating all failure is neither feasible nor desirable. Failure of financial firms is an integral part of the regenerative processes of the market economies: weak firms should fail and thus free up labour and capital that would then be utilised by better firms. However, it is important to ensure smooth functioning of the economy, and avoid disruptive firm failure.

This requires a specialised 'resolution mechanism'. A 'Resolution Cor- poration' would watch all financial firms which have made intense promises to households, and intervene when the net worth of the firm is near zero (but not yet negative). It would force the closure or sale of the financial firm, and protect small consumers either by transferring them to a solvent firm or by paying them. In the case of banks, the deposit insurance program (where all households are guaranteed up to Rs. 100,000 of their bank deposits) would be operated by the resolution corporation.

Drawing on widely recognized international practices, the FSLRC proposal will involve a unified resolution corporation that will deal with an array of financial firms such as banks and insurance companies, not just acting as a bank deposit insurance corporation. It will concern itself with all financial firms which could make significant promises to consumers, such as banks, insurance companies, defined benefit pension funds, and payment systems. It will also take responsibility for the resolution of systemically important financial firms, even if they have no direct links to consumers.

A key feature of the resolution corporation will be speed of action. It must stop a financial firm while the firm is not yet bankrupt. The international experience has shown that delays in resolution almost always lead to a situation where the net worth is negative, which would generally impose costs upon the taxpayer. Hence, a sophisticated legal apparatus is being designed, for a resolution corporation that will act swiftly to stop weak financial firms while they are still solvent. The resolution corporation will choose between many tools through which the interests of consumers are protected, including sales, assisted sales, mergers, etc.

==== Capital controls ====
The grand question of this field is the appropriate sequencing and pace of India's capital account liberalisation. All prosperous countries have negligible capital controls, and India's peers among developing countries have greater capital account openness than India. As Indian policy makers have repeatedly stated, in the long run, India will move towards capital account openness. The Commission will leave the timing and sequencing of capital account liberalisation entirely to policy makers. However, the drafting of law has to envisage the kinds of regulatory instruments used in this field today and in the future. From this perspective, three key questions can be identified.

The first question concerns the economic purpose of capital controls. One possible approach in justifying capital controls lies in the argument that conditions in the global economy are sometimes turbulent. Capital controls could then be useful as a tool for shielding India from those problems. This economic purpose for capital controls suggests the use of temporary capital controls, which are brought in during certain periods.

The second question concerns the nature of controls. Capital controls can either be structured as detailed microeconomic interventions (e.g. specialised rules about margin payment by foreign investors trading on exchanges) or they can be structured as macroeconomic instruments (e.g. an unremunerated reserve requirement, that discourages short-term flows). Both these alternatives have strengths and weaknesses.

The third issue is about the agency structure. Where should the law, that is enacted by Parliament, place the functions of rule-making and supervision for capital controls? At present, capital controls in the field of FDI (e.g. liberalisation of FDI in multi-brand retail) are determined by the government. In addition, there are tight connections between the liberalisation of outward flows and a fiscal question: the extent of domestic financial repression (the forced lending by households through banks to the government). Further, capital account restrictions are analogous to protectionism in the financial sector. As with liberalisation of trade, capital account decontrol involves analysing the political ramifications of gainers and losers from liberalisation. This raises questions about whether the rule-making function (i.e. the drafting of subordinated legislation under the capital controls law) should be placed with the Ministry of Finance or the RBI. Similarly, supervisory functions (i.e. the enforcement of the subordinated legislation) could potentially be placed at RBI or at the Financial Intelligence Unit (FIU), which watches India's cross-border flows from the viewpoint of restraining the financing of terrorism. Each of these alternatives has strengths and weaknesses.

The Commission will debate these questions, which define the basic character of capital controls law. The Commission will take a view on them, and draft laws analogous to the approach adopted in other laws: emphasising enumerated objectives, enumerated powers, a sophisticated rule-making process, and the rule of law.

==== Systemic risk ====
The problem of systemic risk requires a bird's eye perspective of the financial system. The first function in this field is that of reducing the probability of a breakdown of the financial system. This requires understanding the financial system as a whole, as opposed to individual sectors or firms, and undertaking actions which reduce the possibility of a collapse of the financial system. Each financial regulator tends to focus on regulating and supervising some components of the financial system. With sectoral regulation, financial regulators sometimes share the worldview of their regulated entities. What is of essence in the field of systemic risk is avoiding the worldview of any one sector, and understanding the overall financial system.

Systemically important financial institutions (SIFIs), which are often conglomerates operating across multiple elements of the financial system, pose special problems for micro-prudential regulation and resolution. An integrated statistical picture of the entire financial system would be used to identify SIFIs, and help coordinate joint work between multiple regulatory agencies in their micro-prudential regulation.

Inter-agency coordination is particularly important in a crisis. Decisions that impact on multiple sectors need to be swiftly taken, and correctly enforced by multiple different agencies. Crisis management might involve utilising taxpayer resources, which can only be authorised by the government. Decisions may also be required about drawing on emergency lines of credit from the central bank, in its capacity as the lender of last resort. This analysis needs to be taken in a coordinated fashion between all financial agencies, drawing on an accurate picture of the full financial system.

The Commission will debate these questions, and will take a view on them, and make recommendations accordingly.

==== Development ====
A uniquely important policy problem in India is that of financial inclusion. This forms the rationale for the development agenda in finance. The agenda relates to (i) the development of missing markets, such as the bond market, and achieving scale and outreach with nascent markets; (ii) redistribution and quasi-fiscal operations where certain sectors, income or occupational categories are the beneficiaries.

The first, or the development of missing markets, requires information gathering and analysis on the scale of the full financial system, rather than within one sector at a time. Inter-regulatory coordination is required.

The fundamentals of public administration suggest that quasi-fiscal functions should only be performed by the fiscal authority. This could be achieved by placing rule-making functions related to development (e.g. regulations for priority sector lending) closer to the fiscal authority, while asking regulatory agencies to verify compliance (i.e. to perform the supervisory function).

The open question in the field concerns the institutional mechanism through which this could be achieved. These functions could be placed at regulatory agencies or elsewhere. The Commission will debate these questions and make recommendations emphasising enumerated objectives, enumerated powers, a sophisticated rule-making process, and the rule of law.

==== Monetary policy ====
Monetary policy is the function of creating 'fiat money', i.e. money that derives its value because the State asserts that it is legal tender. It involves (a) creating the Indian rupee, (b) setting the short-term interest rate, and (c) operating a 'lender of last resort' facility whereby liquidity is temporarily extended to solvent but illiquid financial firms.

Monetary policy independence is required, in order to avoid election-related cycles in monetary policy. Alongside this independence, an accountability mechanism needs to be set up. The mainstream strategy that is used worldwide is that of tasking the monetary authority with achieving price stability.

==== Debt Management ====
The management of public debt requires a specialised investment banking capability. A series of expert committees have suggested that this should be done in a professional debt management office for two reasons:

1. Debt management requires an integrated picture of all onshore and offshore liabilities of the government. At present, this information is fragmented across RBI and the Ministry of Finance. Unifying this information, and the related debt management functions, will yield better decisions and thus improved debt management.
2. A central bank that sells government bonds faces conflicting objectives. When RBI is given the objective of obtaining low cost financing for the government, this may give RBI a bias in favour of low interest rates which could interfere with the goal of price stability.

==== Foundations of Contract and Property ====
The last component of financial law is the set of adaptations of conventional commercial law on questions of contracting and property rights that is required in fields such as securities and insurance. Statutes as well as case laws have shaped the rules regarding creation of financial contracts, transfer of rights, title or interest in such contracts and enforcement of such rights. These developments have largely been sector specific.

The FSLRC has looked into the necessity of keeping these sector specific rules and will retain them only under special circumstances. Where the law can be made sector neutral or the law has been unable to keep pace with financial innovation, the FSLRC will propose new formulations of law.

For instance, financial transactions have to be defined in a functional manner to ensure that financial innovations do not exceed regulatory jurisdiction. Rules regarding enforceability of derivative contracts have to be laid down. Clarity in rules of enforcement of contracts involving the market infrastructure institutions such as, exchanges, clearing corporations and depositories, is indispensable for organised financial trading. The priority of clearing houses in the bankruptcy process needs to be examined. Developing the over-the-counter market also comes with its own set of contractual issues. The FSLRC has also looked into issues of market integrity which may have implications on creation and transfer of contracts in the financial sector.

== Critics ==
Upon the release of the FSLRC Approach Paper an extensive debate has taken place on the Commission's proposed suggestions. While plenty responses were positive and encouraged the Commission's work, strong oppositions on some fundamental issues have also come up.

=== Super Regulator ===
Amongst the chief concerns for most critics has been the suggestion to formulate a unified financial regulator, which will be a single entity to regulate all financial firms (except banks) for both the consumer protection and micro-prudential requirements. Reasons cited include:

1. Regulatory monopoly
2. Lack of required skill sets for such an organisation
3. International experience demonstrates its failure (comparing it to the FSA model in the UK)
4. Different sectors require different expertise and specialisation. A single regulator will not be able to maintain such broad spectrum of work load.
5. Two decades of empowerment of financial regulators is sought to be reversed with this report.
6. Creating a statutory body called the Financial Stability and Development Council (FSDC) chaired by the finance minister, which will sit over the regulators, would further take away the independence and expertise of regulators, is regressive and deeply disturbing.
7. there is no internal consistency of reducing the number of regulators to reduce regulatory arbitrage. Either there should be one regulator for the entire financial sector if the story is that there is possibility of gaps and turf wars between regulators, or the status quo should continue (arguments for a unified agency can be found in the "Proposals" section under "Proposed Architecture" subsection)
8. Principles based law sounds good in theory - but it is difficult and wrong to implement it - can you calculate margins based on 'fairness' or must you not rely on a mathematical formula (howsoever inaccurate it may be.

=== Central bank: Reserve Bank of India ===
The FSLRC has also suggested some big changes for the RBI. Being amongst the oldest regulators in India, the RBI has enjoyed a special status, not only in terms of its powers, but also in the public image. The call to cut back some of its powers and redefining its objectives met significant resistance.

Arguments include:

1. Debt Management should remain with the RBI: Managing public debt is a complex procedure. It requires coordination of the monetary policy as well as the fiscal policy and thus RBI is ideally suited to tackle the situation.
2. Response:
3. A single objective for the RBI is too simplistic:

=== Others ===
Among the other criticisms:

1. The changes are so drastic that they will never get implemented.
2. The Commission has over stepped its mandate. Instead of strengthening and improving the existing laws, they have tried to hard to overhaul the entire system.
3. The report is detached from reality

=== Media coverage ===
1. Sandeep Parekh - Financial Express (4/10/2013)
2. Ila Patnaik - Financial Express (2/10/2012)
3. Monika Halan - Mint (2/10/2012)
4. Asit Ranjan Mishra - Mint (2/10/2012)
5. Editorial - Financial Express (2/10/2012)
6. Editorial - Economic Times (4/10/2012)
7. Shaji Vikraman - Economic Times (4/10/2012)
8. Dhirendra Kumar - Economic Times (8/10/2012)
9. George Mathew - Indian Express (9/10/2012)
10. Bimal Jalan - Monecontrol (13/10/2012)
11. Sucheta Dalal - Moneylife (16/10/2012)
12. Sameer Kochhar - Inclusion.in (17/10/2012)
13. C Rangarajan - Moneycontrol (20/10/2012)
14. C Rangarajan - Mint (28/10/2012)
15. C Rangarajan - Times of India (29/10/2012)
16. S S Tarapore - Inclusion.in (29/10/2012)

== See also ==
- Manu Needhi Consumer and Environmental Protection Centre
