= Radhabinod Pal =

Indian jurist (1886–1967)

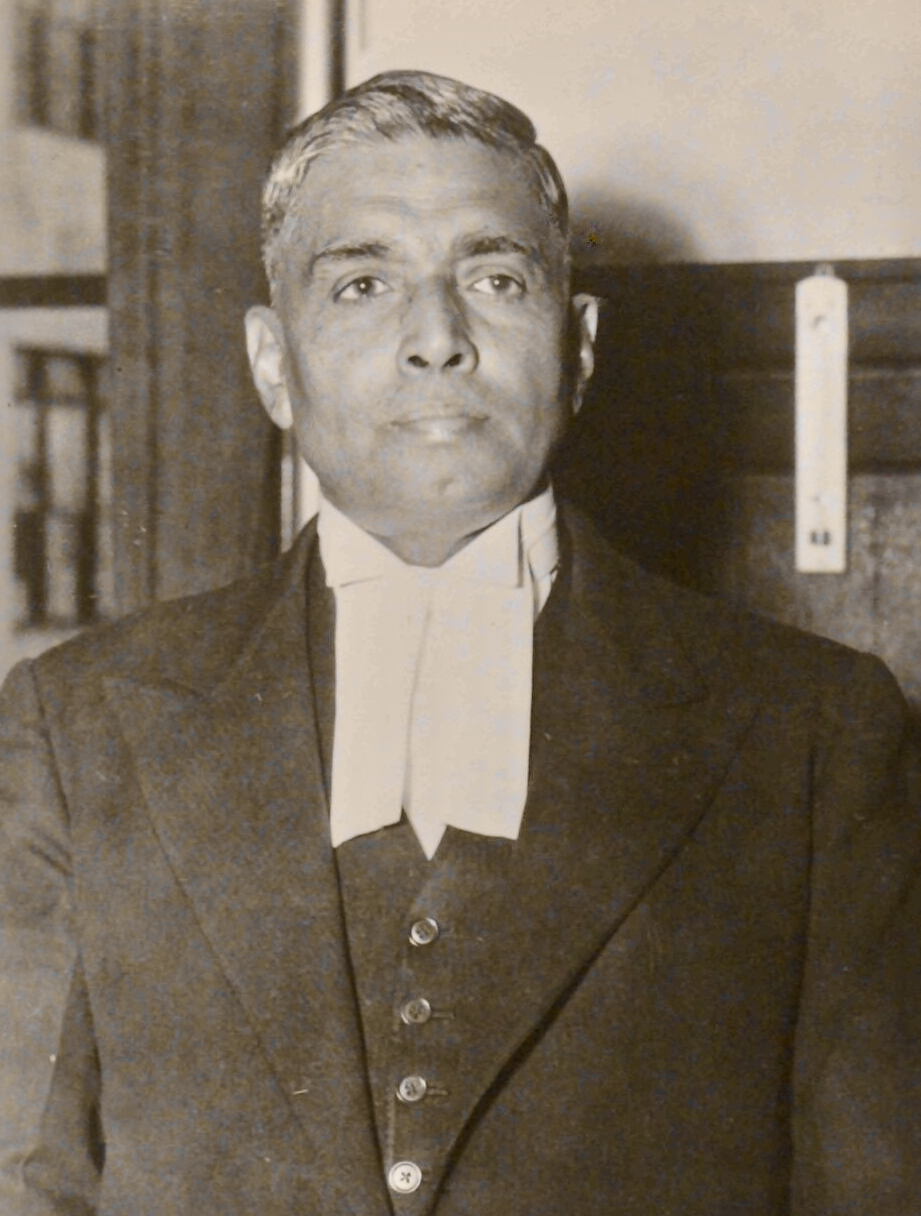
- Born: 27 January 1886; Salimpur, Nadia district, Bengal Presidency, British India (present day in Kushtia, Bangladesh)
- Died: 10 January 1967 (aged 80); Calcutta, West Bengal, India
- Education: Rajshahi College; Presidency University, Kolkata; Hazra Law College, University of Calcutta
- Occupation: Jurist
- Known for: Tokyo Trial
- Spouse: Nalini Bala Pal (m. 1907)
- Children: 14
- Relatives: Satyabrata Pal (grandson) Debi Prasad Pal (son-in-law)
- Awards: Padma Vibhushan

Radhabinod Pal (27 January 1886 – 10 January 1967) was an Indian jurist who was a member of the United Nations' International Law Commission from 1952 to 1966. Pal was one of three Asian judges appointed to the International Military Tribunal for the Far East, the "Tokyo Trials" of Japanese war crimes committed during the Second World War. Among all the judges of the tribunal, he was the only one who submitted a judgement which insisted all defendants were not guilty. The Yasukuni Shrine and the Kyoto Ryozen Gokoku Shrine have monuments specially dedicated to Pal.

== Early life and education ==
Radhabinod Pal was born in 1886 in the village of Salimpur, Kushtia, then part of undivided Nadia district in Bengal Presidency, British India (present-day Bangladesh) into a Bengali Hindu Vaishnavite family.

His father left his mother and his two sisters when he was three years old, and his mother raised the children under difficult circumstances. He started school at eight and only because school fees were waived in his case.

He passed the Entrance Examination in 1903, and F.A. Examination in 1905 from Rajshahi College with distinctions. Radhabinod Pal took his BA Honors (1907) and MA (1908) in Mathematics from the Presidency College, Calcutta. Pal worked as a clerk at the Allahabad Accountant General Office before he took his BL degree in 1911. Pal later served as a lecturer in Mathematics at the Ananda Mohan College, Mymensingh. Alongside his teaching, Pal also practised law at the Mymensingh Bar. While in Mymensingh, Pal further stretched his legal qualifications by obtaining the LLM degree (1920) from Calcutta University. He studied constitutional law at Presidency College, Calcutta (now Kolkata), and the Law College of the University of Calcutta. He stood First in the First Class. Pal then moved to Calcutta to build a legal career in the High Court.

== Career ==
Pal was a major contributor to the formulation of the Indian Income Tax Act of 1922. The British Government of India appointed Pal as a legal advisor in 1927. He worked as professor at the Law College of the University of Calcutta from 1923 till 1936. Pal became a judge of the Calcutta High Court in 1941 and Vice-Chancellor of the University of Calcutta in 1944.

He was asked to represent British India as a member of the tribunal of judges officiating at the Tokyo Trials in 1946. In deliberations with judges from 10 other countries, Pal was highly critical of the prosecution's use of the legal concept of conspiracy in the context of pre-war decisions by Japanese officials. He also maintained that the tribunal should not retrospectively apply (nulla poena sine lege) the new concept of Class A war crimes – waging aggressive (also known as crimes against peace) – and crimes against humanity (that had already been used ex post facto at the Nuremberg Trials). Hence Pal dissented from the tribunal's verdicts of guilt in the cases of defendants charged with Class A war crimes. His reasoning also influenced the judges representing the Netherlands and France, and all three of these judges issued dissenting opinions. However, under the rules of the tribunal, all verdicts and sentences were decided by a majority of the presiding judges.

== War crimes trial dissent ==
While finding that "the evidence is still overwhelming that atrocities were perpetrated by the members of the Japanese armed forces against the civilian population of some of the territories occupied by them as also against the prisoners of war", he produced a judgement questioning the legitimacy of the tribunal and its rulings. He held the view that the legitimacy of the tribunal was suspect and questionable, because the spirit of retribution, and not impartial justice, was the underlying criterion for passing the judgement.

He concluded:

I would hold that each and every one of the accused must be found not guilty of each and every one of the charges in the indictment and should be acquitted on all those charges.

Judge Pal argued that the United States had clearly provoked the war with Japan and expected Japan to act. He argued that "Even contemporary historians could think that 'as for the present war, the Principality of Monaco, the Grand Duchy of Luxembourg, would have taken up arms against the United States on receipt of such a note (Hull note) as the State Department sent the Japanese Government on the eve of Pearl Harbor'." He also noted that "Questions of law are not decided in an intellectual quarantine area in which legal doctrine and the local history of the dispute alone are retained and all else is forcibly excluded. We cannot afford to be ignorant of the world in which disputes arise."

In his lone dissent, Judge Pal refers to the trial as a "sham employment of legal process for the satisfaction of a thirst for revenge". According to Norimitsu Onishi, while he fully acknowledged Japan's war atrocities – including the Nanjing massacre – he said they were covered in the Class B and Class C trials. Judge Pal noted, "I might mention in this connection that even the published accounts of Nanking 'rape' could not be accepted by the world without some suspicion of exaggeration..."

Furthermore, he believed that the exclusion of Western colonialism and the use of the atom bomb by the United States from the list of crimes, as well as the exclusion of judges from the vanquished nations on the bench, signified the "failure of the Tribunal to provide anything other than the opportunity for the victors to retaliate." Pal wrote that the Tokyo Trials were an exercise in victor's justice and that the Allies were equally culpable in acts such as strategic bombings of civilian targets. Regardless of his personal opinions about Japan, he deemed it appropriate to dissent from the judgement of his "learned brothers" to embody his love for absolute truth and justice. In this he was not alone among Indian jurists of the time; one prominent Calcutta barrister wrote that the Tribunal was little more than "a sword in a wig".

When time shall have softened passion and prejudice, when Reason shall have stripped the mask from misrepresentation, then Justice, holding evenly her scales, will require much of past censure and praise to change places.

— Pal quoting Jefferson Davis in the conclusion of the dissent

The American occupation of Japan ended in 1952, after Tokyo signed the San Francisco Peace Treaty and accepted the Tokyo trials' verdict. The end of the occupation also lifted a ban on the publication of Judge Pal's 1,235-page dissent, which Japanese nationalists used as the basis of their argument that the Tokyo trials were biased.

In 1966, Pal visited Japan and said in a speech that he had admired Japan from an early age for being the only Asian nation that "stood up against the West". The Emperor of Japan conferred upon Pal the First Class of the Order of the Sacred Treasure.

== Personal life ==
Pal married Smt. Nalini Bala in 1907 and was the father of nine daughters (Shanti Rani, Asha Rani, Leela Rani, Bela Rani, Nilima, Roma Rani, Renu Kana, Lakshmi Rani and Smriti Kana) and five sons (Prasanta Kumar, Pradyot Kumar, Pronab Kumar, Pratip Bijoy and Pratul Kumar). One son, Pronab Kumar Pal, also became a lawyer (a barrister), as did his two sons-in-law, Balai Lal Pal (with whom he co-authored a book) and Debi Prasad Pal (who also served as a judge of the Calcutta High Court and Indian Minister of State for Finance).

Pal died in January 1967 aged 80 in Calcutta, West Bengal.

== Posthumous significance in Indo-Japanese relations ==
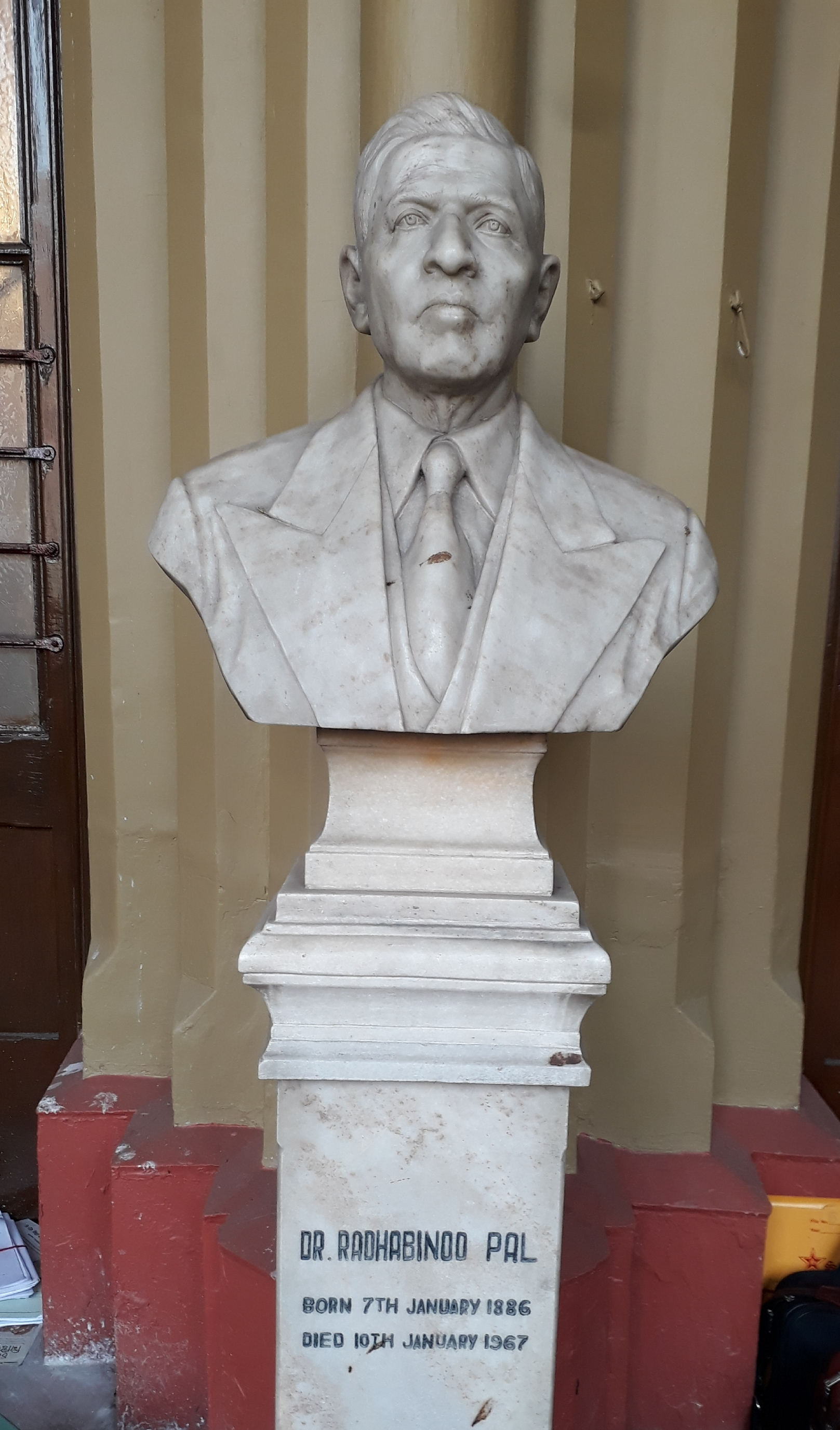
Statue of Radhabinod Pal in Calcutta High Court

Pal is revered by Japanese nationalists and a monument dedicated to him stands on the grounds of the Yasukuni Shrine. The monument was erected after Pal's death.

Judge Pal's dissent is frequently mentioned by Indian diplomats and political leaders in the context of Indo-Japanese friendship and solidarity. For example, on 29 April 2005 Prime Minister Manmohan Singh referred to it as follows, in his remarks at a banquet in New Delhi in honour of the visiting Japanese Prime Minister Junichiro Koizumi:

It is a noteworthy fact that though we have gone through various phases in our relationship, in times of difficulty, we have stood by each other. It is important to recall that India refused to attend the San Francisco Peace Conference in 1951 and signed a separate Peace Treaty with Japan in 1952". "This, Pandit Nehru felt, gave to Japan a proper position of honour and equality among the community of free nations. In that Peace Treaty, India waived all reparation claims against Japan. The dissenting judgement of Judge Radhabinod Pal is well-known to the Japanese people and will always symbolise the affection and regard our people have for your country."

On 14 December 2006, Singh made a speech in the Japanese Diet. He stated:

The principled judgment of Judge Radhabinod Pal after the War is remembered even today in Japan. Ladies and Gentlemen, these events reflect the depth of our friendship and the fact that we have stood by each other at critical moments in our history.

On 23 August 2007, Japanese Prime Minister Shinzō Abe met with Pal's son, Prasanta, in Kolkata, during his day-long visit to the city. Prasanta Pal, now an octogenarian, presented prime minister Abe with four photographs of his father, of which two photographs were of Radhabinod Pal with Abe's grandfather, former Prime Minister Nobusuke Kishi. They chatted for half an hour at a city hotel.

Psychologist and cultural critic Ashis Nandy, as well as other scholars, have argued that Judge Pal's lone dissenting opinion, that the Japanese soldiers were only following orders and that the acts committed by them weren't illegal in an indictable sense, was because of "his long exposure to the traditional laws of India", combined with a sense of "Asian solidarity" within the "larger Afro-Asian context of nationalism".

== State honours ==
- India:
  - Recipient of the Padma Vibhushan
- Japan:
  - Order of the Sacred Treasure 1st Class

== In popular culture ==
He was portrayed by Suresh Oberoi in the 1998 Japanese film Pride. In the 2016 miniseries Tokyo Trial, Pal is portrayed by Indian actor Irrfan Khan.
