= Eleventh Finance Commission =

1998 finance commission of India

The Eleventh Finance Commission of India was appointed by the President on 3 July 1998 for the period 2000–2005.

== Members ==
- Prof. A.M. Khusro, Chair
- Shri N.C Jain
- Shri J.C Jetly, IAS (retired)
- Dr. Amaresh Bagchi
- Shri T.N. Srivastava, IAS, Member Secretary.

== Terms of Reference ==
The commission was asked to make recommendations to the President with regard to the following:-

1. With regard to Chapter I of Part XII of the Constitution, the distribution between the Centre and the States of the net proceeds of taxes and the allocation between the States of the shares of these proceeds
2. The principles governing the grants-in-aid of the revenues of the States out of the Consolidated Fund of India and with regard to Article 275 of the Constitution - the sums to be paid to the States which are in need of assistance by way of grants-in-aid of their revenues for purposes other than those specified in the provisions to clause (1) of that article;
3. With regard to the recommendations made by the Finance Commission of the State; the measures needed to augment the Consolidated Fund of a State to supplement the resources of the Panchayats and Municipalities in the State
4. Suggestions for a restructuring of the public finances so as to restore budgetary balance and maintain macro-economic stability.

== Recommendations ==
With regard to the terms of reference the following were the recommendations made by the commission:

1. The total share of the States in the net proceeds of central taxes and duties would be 29.5% for the next five years
2. With regard to the revenue deficit grants to States, a lumpsum amount of Rs. 11,000 crore in the Central Budget 2000–2001.
3. Grants
  1. For the five years commencing from 1 April 2000, Rs.4,972.63 crore be given for upgrading of standards of administration and specific grants to certain States for special problems.
  2. For the five years commencing from 1 April 2000, Rs.10,000 crore for local bodies, to be directed for maintenance of civic services, Rs.1600 crore per annum is for rural local bodies and Rs.400 crore per annum is for urban local bodies.
4. With reference to the Grants-in-Aid under Article 275 (1) of the Constitution, which amounts to a total of Rs. 35359 crore for the period 2000–2005 to be provided to such States (15 States) which will have deficit non-plan revenue account even after the devolution of central tax revenues, equal to the amount of deficits assessed during the period 2000–2005.
5. With regard to the Calamity Relief Funds in States with an aggregate size of Rs. 11007.59 crore during 2000–2005.
6. The tax devolution from the centre to the State should not exceed 37.5% of total Centre's revenues this should be inclusive of the Central taxes/duties to States and grants-in-aid to States.

The Commission recommended that each State be given a share as specified the net proceeds of all shareable union taxes and duties except the expenditure tax and service tax.

Data for percentage share for certain states is Bihar-14.597, Maharashtra-4.632, Kerala-3.057, Uttar Pradesh-19.798, Punjab-1.147
