= Debi Prasad Pal =

Indian politician (1927–2021)

Dr. Debi Prasad Pal
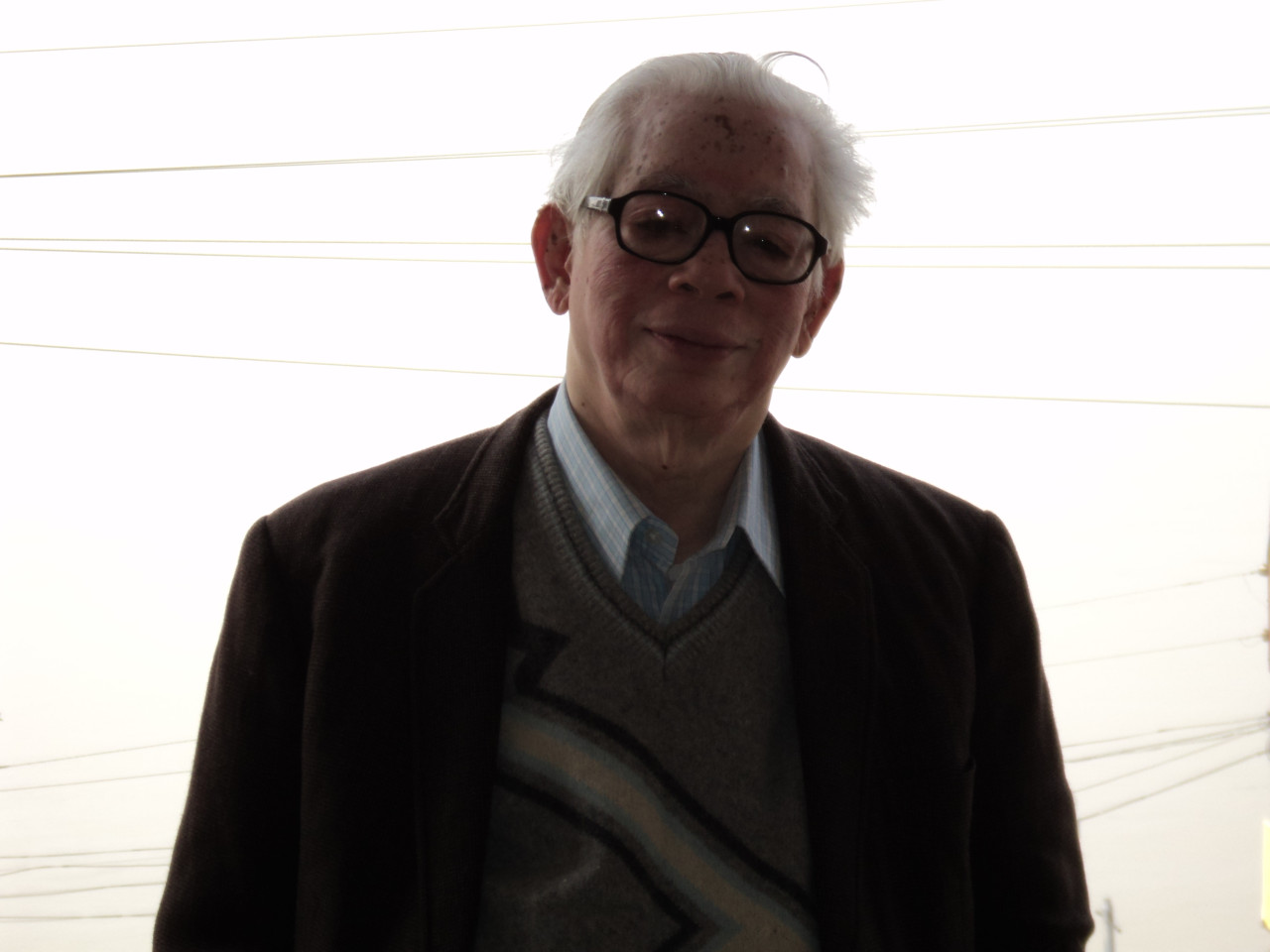
- Pal in 2010

Former Union Finance Minister of State Government of India
- In office 7 January 1995 – 22 May 1996

Member of Parliament, Lok Sabha
- In office 1989–1998
- Preceded by: Ashoke Kumar Sen
- Succeeded by: Sudip Bandyopadhyay
- Constituency: Calcutta North West

Personal details
- Born: 1 November 1927 Calcutta, Bengal Presidency, British India
- Died: 14 May 2021 (aged 93) Kolkata, West Bengal, India
- Party: Indian National Congress
- Spouse: Lakshmi Rani Pal
- Relatives: Radha Binod Pal (father-in-law)
- Education: Surendranath College (Ripon College); Calcutta University
- Occupation: Politician
- Profession: Lawyer
- Website: Lok Sabha Bio Sketch

Debi Prasad Pal (1 November 1927 – 14 May 2021) was a Senior Advocate practicing in the Supreme Court of India and High Courts of India. He was a former Minister of State for Finance, a former Judge of Calcutta High Court and a three-time Member of Parliament (MP) in Lok Sabha.

== Early life and education ==
Debi Prasad Pal was born in 1927 in Kolkata. His father was noted scholar and educationist Aswini Kumar Pal and mother was Sarala Bala Pal. He did his bachelor's studies in Presidency College and got his M.A. degree from Calcutta University. He was awarded the prestigious Doctor of Letters (D.Litt.) degree soon after that for his outstanding contribution to English literature. He got his Doctor of Laws (LL.D.) degree in 1961 for his seminal work. He stood first throughout his academic career. He is the son-in-law of Justice Radhabinod Pal, who was an International Judge.

== Legal career ==
Dr. Pal started practicing in the Calcutta High Court in 1959. He was thereafter appointed a justice in the High Court but resigned within 6 months to rejoin private practice.

== Political career ==
He started his political journey as a member of the Congress party. He contested the Lok Sabha election for the first time in 1989. He was selected by the Congress (I) for the Calcutta North-West parliamentary constituency. He beat his political and legal guru Ashoke Kumar Sen by a huge margin. He was chosen to be the Union Minister of State for Finance by the then Prime Minister of India P. V. Narasimha Rao. He worked with Finance Minister Manmohan Singh, the former Prime Minister of India. He was also elected for the Lok Sabha in the years 1991 and 1996. He briefly joined Trinamool Congress after getting an invitation from its leader Mamata Banerjee but eventually came back to the Congress.

== Union Minister of Finance ==
He was the Union Minister of State for Finance in the Narasimha Rao Government from 1995 - 1996. He was also a member of The Tenth Finance Commission of India.

== Philanthropy ==
Dr. Pal is well known for his charity work. He was one of the founding members of Cancer Foundation of India.

== Senior Advocate ==
He practiced in the Supreme Court of India and High Courts of India. He is considered to be one of the fine lawyers of India in taxation matters. He was one of the highest paid lawyers and was one of the highest income-tax payers in India.

== Member of Financial Sector Legislative Reforms Commission ==
Dr. Pal has been recently appointed a member of the newly constituted Financial Sector Legislative Reforms Commission (FSLRC). The Commission is headed by retired Justice B. N. Srikrishna.
