= Kshitish Chandra Neogy =

Indian politician

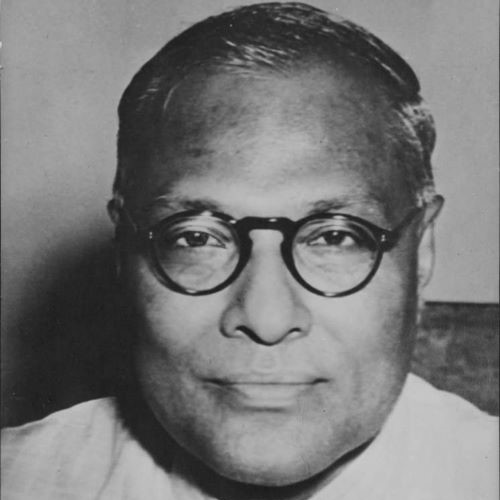

2nd Union Minister of Finance
- In office 18 August 1948 – 22 September 1948
- Prime Minister: Jawaharlal Nehru
- Preceded by: R. K. Shanmukham Chetty
- Succeeded by: John Matthai

2nd Union Minister of Commerce
- In office 6 April 1948 – 19 April 1950
- Preceded by: C. H. Bhabha
- Succeeded by: Jawaharlal Nehru

Personal details
- Born: 1888
- Died: 1970 (aged 81–82)

Kshitish Chandra Neogy (1888–1970), also known as KC Neogy, was an Indian politician from West Bengal. He was a member of the Constituent Assembly of India, member of the first Cabinet of independent India and the chairman of the first Finance Commission of India.

== Political career ==
Neogy was a member of the Indian National Congress and was elected as a member of the Central Legislative Assembly in 1920, 1923, 1926, 1930 representing Bengal and was returned to the assembly in successive elections. He held a number of important posts in Government of India including Chairman of the Planning Advisory Board and Indian Railway Enquiry Committee. He attended the Round Table Conferences representing the Orissa States. He was also a member of the United Nations Commission on Human Rights.

Neogy was elected as a member of the Constituent Assembly of India and after independence became a member of the First Cabinet of Independent India under Jawaharlal Nehru as the Minister of Relief and Rehabilitation and later as Minister for Commerce. After the resignation of R. K. Shanmukham Chetty, Neogy took charge as the second Finance Minister of India in 1948. He held office for just 35 days and did not get an opportunity to present a Budget since he resigned along with Syama Prasad Mookerjee.

On 22 November 1951, Neogy was appointed by the President of India as the chairman of the first Finance Commission of India.

Neogy had three children with his wife, Lila. His eldest son, Prithwish Neogy (1918–91), was a professor of art history at the University of Hawaii at Manoa, USA.

== See also ==
- Ministry of Finance (India)
- Constituent Assembly of India
