= Fifth Finance Commission =

1968 finance commission of India

The Fifth Finance Commission of India was constituted by the President of India, Dr. Zakir Hussain, on 15 March 1968. The commission was chaired by Mahavir Tyagi.

== Members ==
The members of the commission were:

- Shri Mahavir Tyagi, Chairman
- Shri P.C. Bhattacharyya, died during the term of the Commission
- Shri M. Seshachalapathy, retired Judge
- Dr. D. T. Lakdawala
- Shri V.L. Gidwani, Member Secretary
- Shri G. Swaminathan, joined on 21 February 1969, in place of Shri P.C. Bhattacharyya

== Recommendations ==
The Recommendations of the Fifth Finance Commission were wider than those of the previous commissions. Apart from the matters referred to in the earlier commissions, the fifth commission was required to:

- Examine the desirability of maintaining existing arrangements in regard to additional excise duties levied in lieu of Sales Tax and the scope for extension of such arrangements to other items
- To inquire into the unauthorized overdrafts of the States and recommend the procedure for avoiding such overdrafts
- Examine the scope for raising revenue from taxes and duties mentioned in Article 269 of the Constitution.
- Evaluate the scope in which States may raise additional revenue as well as to review state economies in terms of fiscal management and provide a comprehensive study of expenditures in various sectors.
- Evaluate grants-in-aid recommended under Article 275(1) which are to be for purposes ‘other than the requirements of the Five Year Plan’ In addition, while making its recommendations, the commission was called upon to review "the resources of the Central Government and the demands thereon" related to expenditure on civil administration, defense, debt servicing, etc.
- The commission was asked for the first time to indicate the basis of its findings and make available relevant information. Since then transparency in commission findings has been made clear in the Terms of Reference of every successive Finance Commission.
