= Third Finance Commission =

1960 finance commission of India

The Third Finance Commission of India was appointed in 1960, for the period 1960–64, by the President of India and was chaired by Shri A.K. Chanda.

== Members ==
Members of the commission were:

- Shri A. K. Chanda, Chairman
- Shri Govinda Menon
- Shri Dwijendra Nath Roy (retired High Court Judge)
- Prof. M. V. Mathur
- Shri G. R. Kamat (Member Secretary).

== Terms of reference ==
The commission was asked to make recommendations to the President with regard to the following:-

1. On account of Tax Sharing between the Centre and the State and allocation of Income Tax and Central Excise Duties
2. Under Article 275 of the Indian Constitution, Grants-in-Aid to States in need of assistance, other than the sums specified in the provisos to Clause 1 of article 275
  1. With regard to the requirements of third five-year plan
  2. Secondly, with regard to the efforts to be made by those states to raise additional revenue amount
3. Allocation of duties, namely, additional excise duty and estate duty
4. The manner of distribution of ad hoc Grants in-lieu of tax on Railway Passenger Fares

== Recommendations ==
With regard to the terms of reference the following were the recommendations made by the Finance Commission:-

The Finance Commission recommended the formulation of an independent commission to assess the tax potential of each state, to review its tax structure and to recommend rates under different heads of the levies of the state list :-

=== Income tax ===
With regard to the divisible pool of income tax among the states the Finance Commission adopted the criterion of the first Finance Commission that 80% be distributed on the basis of population and 20% on the basis of collection.

The recommended percentage share of the states in divisible pool of the Income Tax:

State	Percent contribution
Maharashtra	13.41
Bihar	9.33
Punjab	4.49
Uttar Pradesh	14.12
Kerala	3.55

=== Union Excise Duty ===
With regard to the distribution of the proceeds of Union Excise Duty, the Finance Commission decided to cover all commodities on the existing list. It recommended that 20% of the net proceeds of Union Excise Duty on all commodities on which such duties were collected and the yield of which exceeded Rs. 50 lakhs in 1960-61 should be allocated to the state.

The share of each state in the distribution of Union Excise Duty was determined by the commission on the basis of population and it rejected consumption as the basis of distribution due to two major reasons

1. Reliable data on consumption wasn't available
2. As it would have given advantage to the more urbanised and financially stronger states.

Percentage share of the 20% of proceeds of the Union Excise Duty for certain major states were:

State	Percentage share
Maharashtra	5.73
Bihar	11.56
Punjab	6.71
Uttar Pradesh	10.68
Kerala	5.46

== Additional duties of excise ==
The central government in consultation with the state governments, decided that an Additional Excise Duty be levied on mill-made textiles, sugar, tobacco, rayon among others and the net proceeds of which should be distributed among them subject to then income derived by each state being assured to it. The Commission rejected this contention as the rates of sales taxes had been revised by them since then. The Commission distributed the guaranteed amount of Rs. 32.54 crores among the States and the remaining amount was distributed, first, on the basis of the percentage increase in the collection of sales tax in each state since 1957- 58 when Additional Excise Duties were imposed and then on the basis of the population.

The Act imposing a tax on the railway passenger fares was repealed after the Third Finance Commission had been constituted. Hence, the commission was asked to make recommendations on the principle on which the ad hoc grant should be distributed among the states. The commission adopted the principle of compensation based on which the grants should be distributed.
