= Dehradun Lok Sabha constituency =

Former constituency in Uttar Pradesh

Coordinates: 30.3°N 78.0°E

Dehradun
- Former Lok Sabha constituency

Constituency details
- Country: India
- Region: North India
- State: Uttar Pradesh
- Established: 1952
- Abolished: 1977

Dehradun Lok Sabha constituency was a Lok Sabha (parliamentary) constituency in Uttar Pradesh (now part of Uttarakhand). This constituency came into existence in 1952 and existed until 1977, following the delimitation of Lok Sabha constituencies.

== Assembly segments ==
Dehradun Lok Sabha constituency comprised the following five Vidhan Sabha (legislative assembly) constituency segments of Uttar Pradesh:

| District | Assembly constituency segments | |
| District | Name | SC/ST |
|---|---|---|
Bijnor
| Bijnor | Laksar | |
| Bijnor | Roorkee | |
Dehradun
| Dehradun | Dehradun | |
Saharanpur
| Saharanpur | Behat | |
| Saharanpur | Haridwar | |

== Members of Parliament ==
Keys:

INC
Independent

| Election | Member | Party |
|---|---|---|
| 1951–52 | Mahavir Tyagi | Indian National Congress |
| 1957 | Mahavir Tyagi | Indian National Congress |
| 1962 | Mahavir Tyagi | Indian National Congress |
| 1967 | Yashpal Singh | Independent |
| 1971 | Mulki Raj Saini | Indian National Congress |

== Election results ==
=== General Election, 1957 ===
1957 Indian general election: Dehradun
| Party | Candidate | Votes | % | ±% |
|---|---|---|---|---|
| INC | Mahavir Tyagi | 1,28,952 | 58.05 | |
| PSP | Narayan Datt Dangwal | 55,064 | 24.79 | |
| ABJS | Jag Mohan Swarup | 38,134 | 17.17 | |
| Margin of victory | | 73,888 | | |
| Turnout | | 2,22,150 | 60.26 | |
| INC hold | | Swing | | |

=== General Election, 1962 ===
1962 Indian general election: Dehradun
| Party | Candidate | Votes | % | ±% |
|---|---|---|---|---|
| INC | Mahavir Tyagi | 1,21,618 | 50.89 | |
| ABJS | Sushila Devi | 47,226 | 19.76 | |
| SWA | Rajendra Das | 35,969 | 15.05 | |
| PSP | Narayan Datt Dangwal | 34,183 | 14.3 | |
| Margin of victory | | 74,392 | | |
| Turnout | | 2,38,996 | 59.09 | |
| INC hold | | Swing | | |

=== General Election, 1967 ===
1967 Indian general election: Dehradun
| Party | Candidate | Votes | % | ±% |
|---|---|---|---|---|
| Independent | Yashpal Singh | 1,51,465 | 49.83 | |
| INC | Mahavir Tyagi | 1,11,353 | 36.64 | |
| Independent | Dharampal | 35,134 | 11.56 | |
| Independent | H. Singh | 5,981 | 1.97 | |
| Margin of victory | | 1,14,112 | | |
| Turnout | | 3,03,933 | 32.64 | |
| Independent gain from INC | | Swing | | |

=== 1971 ===
1971 Indian general election: Dehradun
| Party | Candidate | Votes | % | ±% |
|---|---|---|---|---|
| INC | Mulki Raj Saini | 190,160 | 68.48 | |
| ABJS | Nityanand Swami | 48,635 | 17.51 | |
| JP | Rao Mahmood Ahmed Khan | 12,375 | 4.46 | |
| Independent | Ram Das | 6,351 | 2.29 | |
| Independent | Babu Ram Gupta | 4,798 | 1.73 | |
| Independent | Yashpal Singh | 4,447 | 1.60 | |
| Independent | Kulanand Joshi | 3,407 | 1.23 | |
| Independent | Shyam Lal | 2,646 | 0.95 | |
| Independent | Sarjeet Ali Khan | 1,933 | 0.70 | |
| Independent | Gajendra Singh | 1,898 | 0.68 | |
| Independent | Jagdish Shastri | 1,031 | 0.37 | |
| Margin of victory | | 1,41,525 | | |
| Turnout | | 2,77,681 | 53.96 | |
| INC gain from Independent | | Swing | | |

== See also ==
- List of former constituencies of the Lok Sabha
