= A. M. Khusro =

Indian diplomat

- ए एम खुसरो
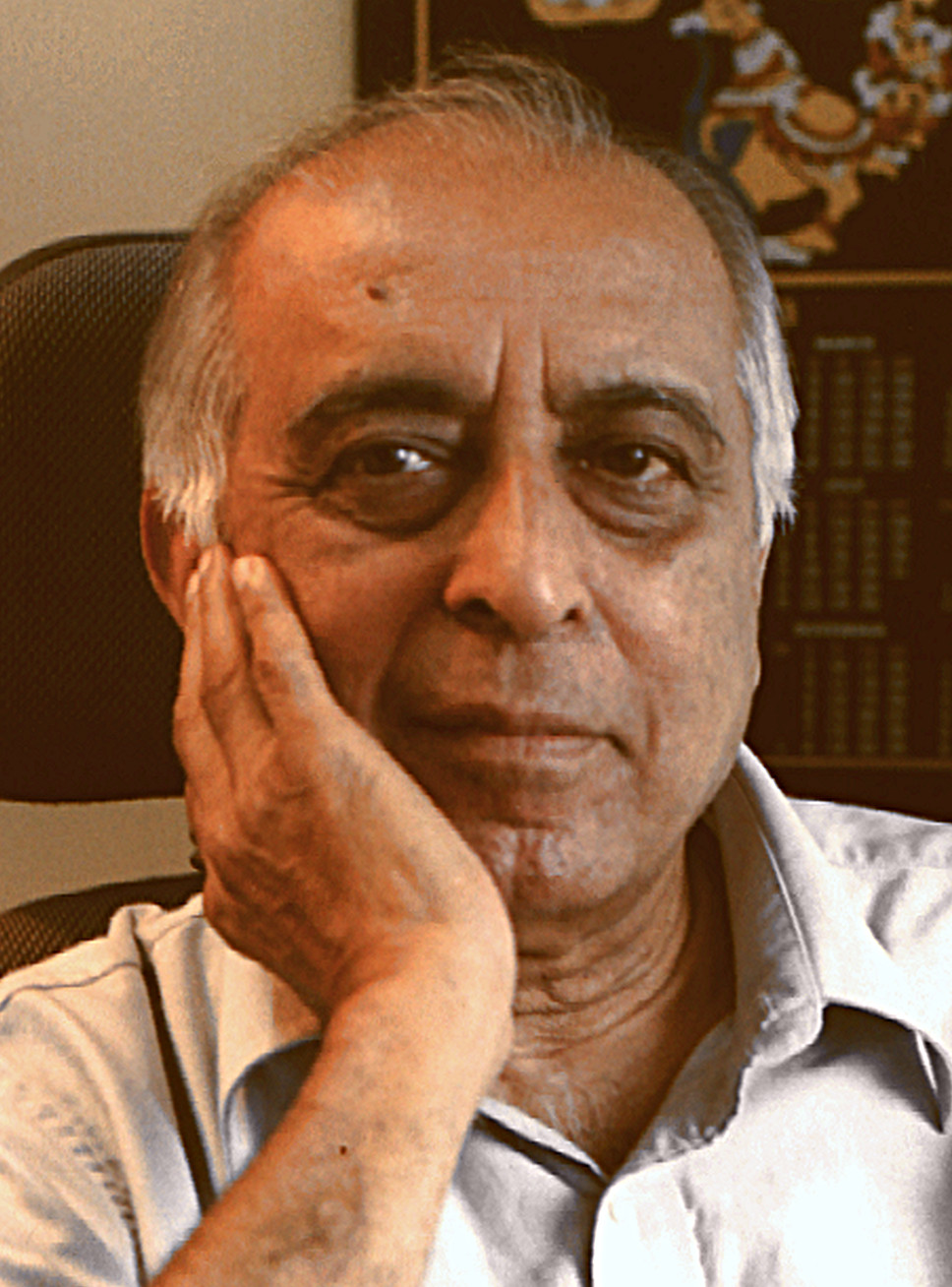
- Khusro in 2003
- Born: Syed Ali Mohammad Hussaini; 1 May 1925; Hyderabad, British India
- Died: 24 August 2003 (aged 78); New Delhi
- Education: Osmania University University of Leeds

Dr. Syed Ali Mohammad Hussaini a.k.a. A. M. Khusro was born in a noble family of Hyderabad. He was also related to the royal family Nizam of Hyderabad. He served as the Vice-Chancellor Aligarh Muslim University (1974–79), a diplomat (Ambassador of India to Germany 1980–82), head of charitable Institutions – Aga Khan Foundation (India), President, Federation of Indo-German Societies in India and Chairman of The Eleventh Finance Commission of India.

Dr. Syed Ali Mohammad Hussaini was born in Hyderabad on 1 May 1925 to a distinguished family of aristocrats, administrators and scholars. He graduated from Osmania University, Hyderabad and completed his Ph.D. in economics at the University of Leeds in 1952. He was a paternal grandson of Nawab Jaffar Yar Jung Bahadur who was a Talluqdar and maternal grandson of Nawab Dastagir Nawaz Jung Bahadur who was a Principal Secretary of the Nizam H.E.H Nawab Mir Osman Ali Khan Bahadur.

He was an eminent diplomat, academic, journalist, administrator and policy analyst in India before dying in August 2003. He was one of India's most celebrated economists who also served as a professor of economics at the Delhi University from 1957 to 1974. He was also director of the Institute of Economic Growth in Delhi; Director, Reserve Bank of India; Board of Trustees, State Bank of India Mutual fund, Chairman, Agha Khan Foundation, Editor, Financial express; Director, Indian Express Newspaper; Vice-Chancellor of Aligarh Muslim University; Indian ambassador to Germany; Member, Planning Commission, GOI; Chancellor, Aligarh Muslim University; Consulting Editor, Financial Express; Chairman, Institute of Economic Growth, Delhi; Chairman, Agricultural credit review, Reserve Bank of India; Chairman, National Institute of Public finance and Policy, Delhi; Chairman, Center of economic and social studies, Hyderabad; Director, All India Radio, Director, Air India; Member, National Commission of agriculture; Chairman, Committee on Monetary Effects of PL480; President, Indian Economic Association; President, Indian Agriculture Exonomics Conference; Chairman, Eleventh Finance Commission, GOI; Member, Prime Minister's Economic Advisory Council; Visiting Professor, Massachusetts Institute of Technology (MIT), USA; Visiting Professor, Fletcher school of Law and Diplomacy; Visiting Lecturer, University of Leeds, Sussex, London, and Manchester besides many more important positions. He was author of 22 books and a number of articles in national and international journals and newspapers. The German government conferred upon him the 'Commander's Cross of the Order of Merit' which is the highest civilian award conferred to an Indian diplomat. He was also awarded with the degree of LL.D (Honoris Causa) from University of Leeds, UK, and Ph.D. degree (Honoris Causa) from Gulbarga University.

He was on various international assignments such as member of the Indian delegation to UNCTAD II; represented the Prime Minister of India at the conference of Club of Rome in Mexico; leader of the Indian delegation from the Planning Commission to the Gosplan of the Soviet Union and East Germany; chairman of the expert group on the future of the International Monetary and Financial system setup by the chairperson of the Non-Aligned Movement, Mrs Indira Gandhi; Fulbright Fellowship at M.I.T.; Humboldt Fellowship, Hamburg, Germany; chairman of the Review Committee of the International Food Policy Research Institute in Washington, D.C.; leader of the Indian delegation at the Human Rights Commission at Geneva; member of the Indo-German Consultative Group, Ministry of External Affairs (1992 onwards).
