= Tenth Finance Commission =

1992 finance commission of India

The Tenth Finance Commission of India was incorporated in the year 1992 consisting of Shri Krishna Chandra Pant as the chairman.

== Members ==
The members of the commission were:

- Shri Krishna Chandra Pant, Chairman
- Dr. Debi Prasad Pal, Member of Parliament
- Shri B.P.R. Vithal
- Dr. C. Rangarajan, resigned on 21 December 1992
- Shri M.C. Gupta, Member Secretary, relinquished charge on 31 January 1994
- Shri Manu R. Shroff, In place of Dr. C. Rangarajan on 14 October 1993
- Shri Arun Sinha, Member Secretary (in place of M.C. Gupta) on 1 March 1994

== Recommendations ==
The commission recommended that:

- The share of the Union Territories would not be determined on the grounds used for state share but it would be decided on the basis of population solely. The percentage would be 0.927% for the years 1995–2000.
- Out of the total income obtained from certain central taxes and duties, 29% should go to the states. This is known as the 'Alternative Scheme of Devolution' and came into effect retrospectively from April 1, 1996.
- The proceeds from the ‘penalties’ and ‘interest recovered’ under the miscellaneous receipts should be included in to the divisible income tax pool as recommended by Ninth Commission with effect from 1 April 1995.
- The share of the net proceeds would be 77.5% for five years.
- The commission dropped the collection factor as the criterion for distribution
- The distribution of the net proceeds among states would be as follows:-
  - 20% on the basis of population of 1971
  - 60% on basis of distance of per capita income
  - 5% on basis of area adjusted
  - 5% on basis of infrastructure index
  - 10% on basis of tax effort
