= First Finance Commission =

1951 finance commission of India

The First Finance Commission of India was appointed in 1951, for the period 1952–57 by the President of India and was chaired by K. C. Neogy.

== Members ==
Name	Position	Note
K. C. Neogy	Chairman	
V. P. Menon	Member	Resigned on 18 February 1952
Justice R. Kaushalendra Rao	Member	
B. K. Mada	Member	
M. V. Rangachari	Member	Member Secretary
V. L. Mehta	Member	In Place of V. P. Menon

== Terms of Reference ==
The commission was asked to make recommendations regarding:

1. Allocations of income tax and Union Excise Duties and tax sharing.
2. Amounts payable as Grants-in-Aid to the States in need of Assistance under the ‘substantive portion of Clause 1 of Article 275’.
3. Grants-in-Aid to certain States in lieu of their share of export duty on jute and jute products according to Article 273
4. Continuation or adjustment of the terms of agreement with Part B States under Article 278 (1) or under Article 306.

== Recommendations ==
- The share of States in the proceeds of income tax was to be 55 per cent.
- The First Commission recommended that shares of States in the Union excise duties be 40 per cent of the proceeds of the tax on three commodities, 25 per cent of the proceeds of the tax on eight commodities and 20 per cent of the proceeds of the tax on 35 commodities, respectively.
- As far as Horizontal Distribution is concerned, overwhelming weightage is given to Population (80%). Only residual weightage of 20% given to contribution.
- No recommendations regarding grants for meeting capital requirements of the state were made by the commission.
- The Commission provided Grants-in- Aid (under Article 273) to only four states, namely, Assam Bihar, Orissa and West Bengal. However, Grants were provided to many states under Substantive Portion of Article 275 (1) and under the head of Primary education grants.
- All recommendations made by the commission were accepted by the Union Government.
