= Sixth Finance Commission =

1973 finance commission of India

The Sixth Finance Commission of India was incorporated in the year 1973 consisting of Shri K. Brahmananda Reddy as the chairman.

== Members ==
The members of the commission were:

- Shri K. Brahmananda Reddy, Chairman
- Shri Justice Syed Sadat Abal Masud
- Dr. B.S. Minhas
- Dr. I.S. Gulati
- Shri G. Ramachandran, Member Secretary

== Key recommendations on distribution of income tax shares to states ==
- The States demanded the inclusion of corporation tax into the divisible income tax and 1005 allocation of the net proceeds to them. The commission expressed that such inclusion was constitutionally forbidden but it can be reviewed by National Development Council.
- States share was increased from 75% to 80% due to the decrease in the divisible pool as the arrears of the advance tax collection had been cleared
- In view of the increasing integration of the national economy and for eliminating the regional imbalances the contribution factor was kept at 10% in the distribution of share amongst the states. The distribution inter se the states should be on the basis of fixed percentages
- Out of the net proceeds of the income tax, 1.79% should be allocated to the Union Territories

== Further references ==
- Sansar Singh Janjua (1999). Centre State Financial Relations in India and Finance Commission. New Delhi, India: Anmol Publications. ISBN 8126102233.
- "Finance Commission India". New Delhi, India: Fourteenth Finance Commission.
