= Second Finance Commission =

1956 finance commission of India

The Second Finance Commission of India was constituted by president Rajendra Prasad on 1 June 1956.

== Members ==
The members of the Commission were:

- Shri K. Santhanam, Chairman
- Shri Ujjal Singh
- Shri L.S. Misra, Retired Chief Justice, Hyderabad
- Shri M.V. Rangachari
- Dr. B.N. Ganguli
- Shri H.B. Bhar, Secretary

== Terms of reference ==
The Commission was asked to make the following recommendations:

1. Grants-in-Aid to certain States, in need of assistance under Article 275, having regard to the requirements of Second Five Year Plan and the efforts made by those states to raise additional revenue.
2. Allocation of Estate Duty and Tax on Railway Passenger Fares proposed to be levied by the Railway Passenger Fares Bill, 1957, introduced in the Lok Sabha on 15 May 1957.
3. Grants-in-Aid to the States of Assam, Bihar, Orissa and West Bengal, to compensate for their share of the export duty on jute and jute products as per Article 273.
4. The principles which should govern the distribution under Article 269 of the net proceeds of estate duty in respect of property other than agricultural land, levied by the Government of India in the States within which such duty is leviable.
5. Revisions, if any, of the rates of interest on loans made by the Centre to the States between 15 August 1947 to 31 March 1956 and their terms of repayment. The phenomenal growth of the Union loans to the States justified such adjustments.
6. Apportionments of the net proceeds of the additional Excise Duties proposed to be levied in view of States’ Sales Taxes on the mill-made textiles, sugar and tobacco, and the amounts which should be assured to the States as the income now derived by them from the levy on these commodities and the States Sales Tax (which is to be replaced by the additional duty of excise).

== Recommendations ==
With regard to the distribution of Income Tax, the Commission made the following recommendations:

- Despite the receding contribution by the Income Tax to the devolution of revenue to the States, the Commission recommended an increase in the per cent of the net proceeds to the States from 55 to 60, and the share of the Union Territories should be 1 per cent.
- It was recommended that the distribution of the share of Income tax among the States should be 10 per cent on the basis of collection and 90 per cent of the basis of population, thereby giving greater importance to population than it was earlier.

As far as the allocation to the States from the Union duties of excise on matches, tobacco, vegetable products, tea, coffee, sugar, paper and vegetable non-essential oils was concerned, the Commission considered that it should be 25 per cent.

The table below summarizes what each State was to expect in each of the five years starting from 1 April 1957 under the Second Finance Commission’s recommendations:

States	Share of Taxes	Grants under Article 273	Grants under Article 275	TOTAL
Andhra Pradesh	8.50	–	4.00	12.50
Assam	2.75	0.45	4.05	7.25
Bihar	10.00	0.43	3.80	14.23
Bombay	14.75	–	–	14.75
Kerala	3.75	–	1.75	5.50
Madhya Pradesh	7.00	–	3.00	10.00
Madras	8.25	–	–	8.25
Mysore	5.50	–	6.00	11.50
Orissa	4.00	0.09	3.35	7.44
Punjab	4.25	–	2.25	6.50
Rajasthan	4.25	–	2.50	6.75
