= N. K. Singh =

Indian bureaucrat and politician

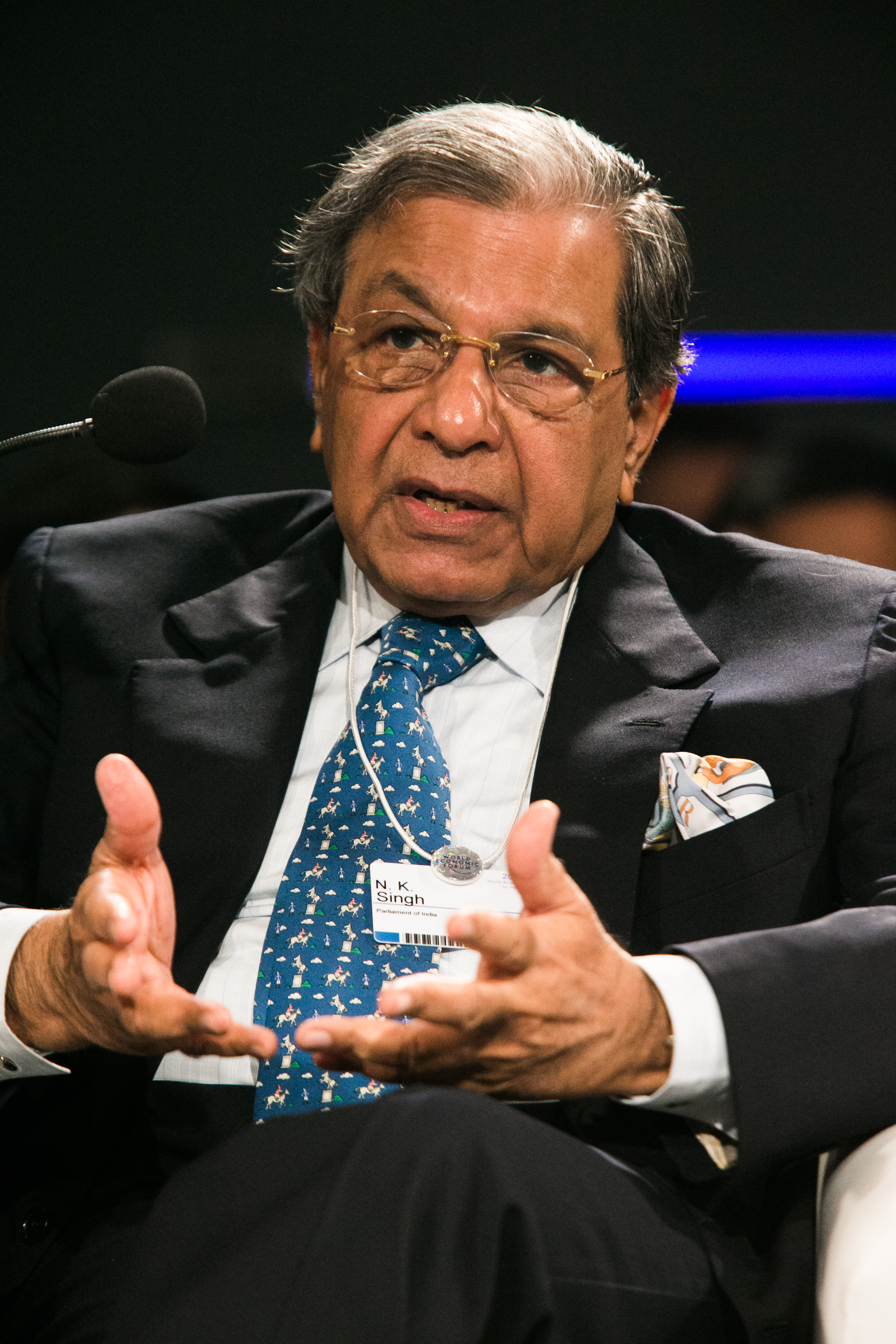
- Singh at the World Economic Forum on India in 2012

Chairman of 15th Finance Commission
- In office 26 November 2017 – 26 November 2023
- Preceded by: Y. V. Reddy
- Succeeded by: Arvind Panagariya

Member of Parliament, Rajya Sabha
- In office 2008–2014
- Constituency: Bihar

Personal details
- Born: 27 January 1941 (age 85) Calcutta, Bengal Presidency, British India
- Party: Bharatiya Janata Party
- Spouse: Prem Kumari Singh (Tiny)
- Children: 3
- Education: St Stephens College, Delhi; Delhi School of Economics; Delhi University
- Occupation: Economist, Civil Servant
- Website: http://web.nksingh.com/

Nand Kishore Singh is an Indian politician, economist and retired Indian Administrative Service officer. He is a senior member of the Bharatiya Janata Party (BJP) since March 2014 after having served as a Member of Parliament in the Rajya Sabha (2008-2014) from Bihar for the Janata Dal (United). He has been a senior bureaucrat, Member of the Planning Commission (Note: a Govt. body tasked with charting the course of Indian economy and later replaced with /renamed as NITI Aayog) and handled assignments of Union Expenditure and Revenue Secretary. He was also Officer on Special Duty to Prime Minister Atal Bihari Vajpayee.

On 27 November 2017, Modi government appointed him as the chairman of Fifteenth Finance Commission of India and served the office till 26 November 2023.

He currently holds the position of Distinguished Fellow at the Centre for Social and Economic Progress. He is also currently on the board of Hindustan Times, ICRIER, IMI, Nalanda University as well as connected with the Stanford University and the India Advisory Committee of London School of Economics and Columbia University. He is the former chairman, board of governors of Management Development Institute (MDI), Gurgaon. He is currently the chairman of the review committee set up under Fiscal Responsibility and Budget Management Act, 2003, under the purview of Ministry of Finance, Government of India.

== Early life and career ==
Born in Kolkata on 27 January 1941, Singh did his schooling at St. Xavier's High School, Patna and completed his Senior Cambridge Examination at St. Xavier's College, Patna before he joined St Stephens College, Delhi for pursuing graduation. He did Masters in Economics from the Delhi School of Economics.

Following that, he has held the following positions:

- Member, State Secretariat, Finance Department (1968–69)
- Under Secretary, Ministry of Commerce (1969–73)
- Special Assistant to Commerce Minister (1973–77)
- Represented India at GATT, UNACTD, UN and the Common Wealth Secretariat.
- Chairman, Bihar State Electricity Board
- Special Assistant to the former President Pranab Mukherjee, then former Minister of Commerce, Steel and Mines (1980–81)
- First Minister, Economic and Commercial, Indian Embassy, Japan (1981–85)
- Additional Finance Commissioner, Principal Secretary Industries and Industrial Development Commissioner, Bihar (1986–90)
- Joint Secretary Police (Ministry of Home Affairs) (1990–91)
- Joint Secretary, Department of Economic Affairs (Ministry of Finance) (1991–93)
- First Chairman UNGEF (United Nations Global Environment Facility) (1993–94)
- Secretary, Department of Economic Affairs (1993–95)
- Secretary, Department of Expenditure (1995–96)
- Revenue Secretary (1996–98)
- Secretary to former PM AB Vajpayee (1998-2001)
- Member Planning Commission (2001–06)
- Deputy Chairman, Bihar State Planning Board (2006–08)
- Member of Parliament to the Rajya Sabha (2008–14)
- President of Institute of Economic Growth (IEG) Society (since 2021)

== Tax Reforms ==
As Revenue Secretary (July 1996 – August 1998), he oversaw the Dream Budget (1997–98), one of the most ambitious tax reforms so far. Tax rates were substantially reduced and personal Income Tax rates were brought down considerably from 15, 30 and 40 per cent to 10, 20 and 30 per cent. Similarly, corporate tax rates were also significantly reduced apart from simplifying and merging the widely varying customs and excise duty structure. Import tariffs were also slashed down to align India's import duties with other emerging markets. Moreover, a Voluntary Disclosure of Income Scheme (VDIS) was launched in the same year which enabled people to make voluntary disclosures given the benefits of lower tax rates. This enabled not only tax realisation of over $2 billion as hidden wealth of over Rs.33,000 crores or $10 billion being brought back to the economic stream. The VDIS scheme is considered a watershed and many have clamoured for its repetition both for domestic and foreign income.

== Task Force on Telecom ==
He has also served as the Secretary, Task Force on Telecommunications and played a key role in placing a far-reaching reform on deregulation of India's Telecommunication sector. During his tenure, another major reform in the telecomm policy was to auction the spectrum bandwidth to the highest bidder.

== National Highway Development Project ==
As PMO Secretary and Member Secretary of the Task Force on Infrastructure, N.K. Singh was instrumental in the planning of the 13000 km National Highways Development Project (NHDP). Comprising the Golden Quadrilateral and the North-South and East-West corridors, it was one of the flagship scheme of the Indian Government and NHAI (National Highway Authority of India).

== Career as a Member of Parliament ==
Singh was elected as a Member of Parliament to the Rajya Sabha from Bihar in April 2008 representing the Janata Dal (United). He was a member of several important Parliamentary Committees including the Public Accounts Committee, Committee on Public Undertakings, Committee on External Affairs, Committee on MPLADS, Parliamentary Standing Committee on Human Resource Development, Consultative Committee on Finance and the Parliamentary Forum on Global Warming and Climate Change. He joined the BJP in the run-up to the General Elections in 2014 following his close association with the NDA for over a decade.

== Author ==
N.K. Singh has written The New Bihar, a collection of essays on the state's model of development, and "Not by Reason Alone", a commentary on Indian political economy and reforms pertaining to infrastructure, finance, government policies and Centre-state relations. His first book, "The Politics of Change", is about Indian politics and economy.

== Awards ==
=== Order of the Rising Sun ===
The Japanese order is the second highest civilian award accorded to people with distinguished achievements in the field of international relations, promotion of Japanese culture, development in welfare or preservation of the environment.

On 29 April 2016, NK Singh was conferred with the 2nd class Gold and Silver of the Order of the Rising sun by the Japanese Government. He is the only Indian in the list of recipients of 2016 Spring Imperial Decorations.

== Chairman, FRBM Committee ==
The Government of India formed a Review Committee to evaluate the FRBM Act, 2003 in order to assess its functionality in the last 12 years. The five-member panel, which includes Former Finance Secretary Sumit Bose, Chief Economic Adviser Arvind Subramanian, Reserve Bank of India Governor Urjit Patel and National Institute of Public Finance and Policy Director Rathin Roy, is chaired by Mr. N.K. Singh. The committee's mandate includes making recommendations to pave the way forward, keeping at its focus fiscal consolidation and prudence. The feasibility of fiscal deficit range and aligning fiscal change with credit change analysis is also incorporated in the ambit.

== Nira Radia Tapes ==
In the recorded conversations in the Nira Radia tapes, NK Singh is heard stating that he got the order of the speakers in the Rajya Sabha changed to give an edge on retroactive tax rebates to Reliance Industries. N.K. Singh said his Reliance advocacy was for national ‘energy security'.
