= Fiscal Responsibility and Budget Management Act, 2003 =

Act of the Parliament of India

Parliament of India
- Long title: An Act to provide to the responsibility of the Central Government to ensure inter – generational equity in fiscal management and long-term macro-economic stability by removing fiscal impediments in the effective conduct of monetary policy and prudential debt management consistent with fiscal sustainability through limits on the Central Government borrowings, debt and deficits, greater transparency in fiscal operations of the Central Government and conducting fiscal policy in a medium-term framework and for matters connected therewith or incidental thereto.
- Citation: https://dea.gov.in/sites/default/files/FRBM%2520Act%25202003%2520and%2520FRBM%2520Rules%25202004.pdf
- Enacted by: Parliament of India
- Enacted: 26 August 2003
- Assented to: 26 August 2003
- Commenced: 5 July 2004
- Introduced by: Mr.Yashwant Sinha
- Status: In force

The Fiscal Responsibility and Budget Management Act, 2003 (FRBMA) is an Act of the Parliament of India to institutionalize financial discipline, reduce India's fiscal deficit, improve macroeconomic management and the overall management of the public funds by moving towards a balanced budget and strengthen fiscal prudence. The main purpose was to eliminate revenue deficit (Note: Revenue Deficit is defined in the act as the difference between the revenue expenditure and revenue receipts which indicates increase in liabilities of the Central Government without corresponding increase in assets) of the country (and subsequently building revenue surplus) and bring down the fiscal deficit to a manageable 3% of the GDP by March 2008. However, due to the 2008 financial crisis, the deadlines for the implementation of the targets in the act was initially postponed and subsequently suspended in 2009. In 2011, given the process of ongoing recovery, Economic Advisory Council publicly advised the Government of India to reconsider reinstating the provisions of the FRBMA. N. K. Singh is currently the Chairman of the review committee for Fiscal Responsibility and Budget Management Act, 2003, under the Ministry of Finance (India), Government of India.

== Enactment ==
The Fiscal Responsibility and Budget Management Bill (FRBM Bill) was introduced in India by the then Finance Minister of India, Yashwant Sinha in December 2000. Firstly, the bill highlighted the terrible state of government finances in India both at the Union and the state levels under the statement of objects and reasons. Secondly, it sought to introduce the fundamentals of fiscal discipline at the various levels of the government. The FRBM bill was introduced with the broad objectives of eliminating revenue deficit by 31 March 2006, prohibiting government borrowings from the Reserve Bank of India three years after enactment of the bill, and limit the fiscal deficit to 2% of GDP (also by 31 March 2006). Further, the bill proposed for the government to reduce liabilities to 50% of the estimated GDP by year 2011. There were mixed reviews among economists about the provisions of the bill, with some criticising it as too drastic. Political debate ensued in the country. Several revisions later, it resulted in a much relaxed and watered-down version of the initial bill (including postponing the date for elimination of revenue deficit to 31 March 2008) with some experts, like Dr Saumitra Chaudhuri of ICRA Ltd. (Note: Formerly Investment Information and Credit Rating Agency of India Limited) (and now a member of Prime Ministers' Economic Advisory Council) commenting, "all teeth of the Fiscal Responsibility Bill have been pulled out and in the current form it will not be able to deliver the anticipated results." This bill was approved by the Cabinet of Ministers of the Union Government of India in February, 2003 and following the due enactment process of Parliament, it received the assent of the President of India on 26 August 2003. Subsequently, it became effective on 5 July 2004. This would serve as the day of commencement of this Act.

== Objectives ==
The main objectives of the act were:

1. to introduce transparent fiscal management systems in the country
2. to introduce a more equitable and manageable distribution of the country's debts over the years
3. to aim for fiscal stability for India in the long run

Additionally, the act was expected to give necessary flexibility to Reserve Bank of India for managing inflation in India.

== Content ==
Since the act was primarily for the management of the governments' behaviour, it provided for certain documents to be tabled in the parliament annually with regards to the country's fiscal policy. This included the following along with the Annual Financial Statement and demands for grants:

1. a document titled Medium-term Fiscal Policy Statement – This report was to present a three-year rolling target for the fiscal indicators (Note: The fiscal indicators was defined in this law as numerical ceilings and proportions to Gross Domestic Product, as may be prescribed for evaluation of the fiscal position of the Central Government.) with any assumptions, if applicable. This statement was to further include an assessment of sustainability with regards to revenue deficit and the use of capital receipts of the Government (including market borrowings) for generating productive assets.
2. a document titled Fiscal Policy Strategy Statement – This was a tactical report enumerating strategies and policies for the upcoming Financial Year including strategic fiscal priorities, taxation policies, key fiscal measures and an evaluation of how the proposed policies of the Central Government conform to the 'Fiscal Management Principles' of this act.
3. a document titled Macro-economic Framework Statement – This report was to contain forecasts enumerating the growth prospects of the country. GDP growth, revenue balance, gross fiscal balance and external account balance of the balance of payments were some of the key indicators to be included in this report.
4. a document titled Medium-term Expenditure Framework Statement - This is to set forth a three-year rolling target for prescribed expenditure indicators with specification of underlying assumptions and risk involved (vide Section 6 A of the Act amended in 2012).

The Act further required the government to develop measures to promote fiscal transparency and reduce secrecy in the preparation of the Government financial documents including the Union Budget.

=== Fiscal management principles ===
The Central Government, by rules made by it, was to specify the following:

1. a plan to eliminate revenue deficit by 31 March 2008 by setting annual targets for reduction starting from day of commencement of the act.
2. reduction of annual fiscal deficit of the country
3. annual targets for assuming contingent liabilities in the form of guarantees and the total liabilities as a percentage of the GDP

=== Borrowings from Reserve Bank of India ===
The Act provided that the Central Government shall not borrow from the Reserve Bank of India except under exceptional circumstances where there is temporary shortage of cash in particular financial year. It also laid down rules to prevent RBI from trading in the primary market for Government securities. It restricted them to the trading of Government securities in the secondary market after an April, 2005, barring situations highlighted in exceptions paragraph.

==== Exceptions ====
National security, natural calamity or other exceptional grounds that the Central Government may specify were cited as reasons for not implementing the targets for fiscal management principles, prohibition on borrowings from RBI and fiscal indicators highlighted above, provided they were approved by both the Houses of the Parliament as soon as possible, once these targets had been exceeded.

== Measures to enforce compliance ==
This was a particularly weak area of the act. It required the Finance Minister of India to only conduct quarterly reviews of the receipts and expenditures of the Government and place these reports before the Parliament. Deviations to targets set by the Central government for fiscal policy had to be approved by the Parliament. No other measures for failure of compliance have been specified.

== Implementation ==
=== Targets and fiscal indicators ===
Subsequent to the enactment of the FRBMA, the following targets and fiscal indicators were agreed by the central government:

- Revenue deficit
  - Date of elimination – 31 March 2009 (postponed from 31 March 2008)
  - Minimum annual reduction – 0.5% of GDP
- Fiscal Deficit
  - Ceiling – 3% of the GDP by 31 March 2008
  - Minimum annual reduction – 0.3% of GDP
- Additional Liabilities (including external debt at current exchange rate) – 9% of the GDP (a target increased from the original 6% requirement in 2004–05)
  - Annual reduction – 1% of GDP
- RBI purchase of government bonds – to cease from 1 April 2006

Four fiscal indicators to be projected in the medium term fiscal policy statement were proposed. These are, revenue deficit as a percentage of GDP, fiscal deficit as a percentage of GDP, tax revenue as percentage of GDP and total outstanding liabilities as percentage of GDP.

=== Jurisdiction ===
The residuary powers to make rules with respect to this act were with the Central Government with subsequent presentation before the Parliament for ratification. Civil courts of the country had no jurisdiction for enforcement of this act or decisions made therein. The power to remove difficulties was also entrusted to the Central Government.

== Criticism ==
Some quarters, including the subsequent Finance Minister Mr. P. Chidambaram, criticised the act and its rules as adverse since it might require the government to cut back on social expenditure necessary to create productive assets and general upliftment of rural poor of India. The vagaries of monsoon in India, the social dependence on agriculture and over-optimistic projections of the task force in-charge of developing the targets were highlighted as some of the potential failure points of the Act. However, other viewpoints insisted that the act would benefit the country by maintaining stable inflation rates which in turn would promote social progress.

Some others have drawn parallel to this act's international counterparts like the Gramm-Rudman-Hollings Act (US) and the Stability and Growth Pact (EU) to point out the futility of enacting laws whose relevance and implementation over time are bound to decrease. They described the law as wishful thinking and a triumph of hope over experience. Parallels were drawn to the US experience of enacting debt-ceilings and how lawmakers have traditionally been able to amend such laws to their own political advantage. Similar fate was predicted for the Indian version which indeed was suspended in 2009 when the economy hit rough patches.

== Suspension and reinstatement ==
Implementing the act, the government had managed to cut the fiscal deficit to 2.7% of GDP and revenue deficit to 1.1% of GDP in 2007–08. However, due to the 2008 financial crisis, the deadlines for the implementation of the targets in the act were suspended. The fiscal deficit rose to 6.2% of GDP in 2008–09 against the target of 3% set by the Act for 2008–09. However, IMF estimated fiscal deficit to be 8% after accounting for oil bonds and other off budget expenses.

In August 2009, IMF had opined that India should implement fiscal reform at the soonest possible, enacting a successor to the current act. This IMF paper was authored by two senior IMF economists Alejandro Sergio Simone and Petia Topalova and highlighted the shortcomings of the current law along with proposed improvements for a new version.

It was reported that the Thirteenth Finance Commission of India was working on a new plan for reinstating fiscal management in India. The initial expectation for revival of fiscal prudence was in 2010–11 but was further delayed. Finally, the government did announce a path of fiscal consolidation starting from fiscal deficit of 6.6% of GDP in 2009–10 to a target of 3.0% by 2014–15 However, eminent economist and ex-RBI Deputy Governor, S.S. Tarapore is quick to highlight the use of creative accounting to misrepresent numbers in the past. Furthermore, he added that fiscal consolidation is indeed vital for India, as long as the needs of the poor citizens are not marginalised. This need for financial inclusion of the poor while maintaining the fiscal discipline was highlighted by him as the most critical requirement for the 2011–12 Budget of India.

More recently, in February 2011, the PMEAC recommended the need for reinstatement of fiscal discipline of the Government of India, starting 2011–12 financial year. In FY 2011–12, it was almost certain that government would cross the budgetary fiscal deficit target of 4.6% and it would be around 5%.

== State-level fiscal responsibility legislations in India ==
The tenth plan of the Planning Commission of India highlighted the need for fiscal discipline at the level of the states. This was to reduce the debt-to-GDP ratio of India. Reserve Bank of India, in its role as the ultimate financial authority in India, was also a keen supporter of the concept and publicly highlighted the need for state level fiscal responsibility legislation in India. By 2007, the states of Karnataka, Kerala, Punjab, Tamil Nadu, Maharashtra and Uttar Pradesh are among those which have already legislated the required fiscal discipline laws at the state level.

== FRBM Review Committee of 2016 ==
Finance Minister Arun Jaitley announced the FRBM Review Committee to be set up in the budget speech of February 2016–17. The Government of India had set up a review committee to evaluate the FRBM Act, 2003[5] in order to assess its functionality in the last 12 years. The five-member panel announced by the finance minister includes Former Revenue Secretary and Secretary to the Prime Minister of India N. K. Singh as its chairman, former Finance Secretary Sumit Bose, Chief Economic Adviser Arvind Subramanian, Reserve Bank of India Governor Urjit Patel and National Institute of Public Finance and Policy Director Dr Rathin Roy. The committee had wide-ranging terms of reference (ToR) to comprehensively review the existing FRBM Act in the light of contemporary changes, past outcomes, global economic developments, best international practices and to recommend the future fiscal framework and roadmap for the country. Subsequently, the Terms of Reference were enlarged to seek the committee's views on certain recommendations of the Fourteenth Finance Commission and the Expenditure Management Commission. These primarily related to strengthening the institutional framework on fiscal matters as well as certain issues connected with new capital expenditures in the budget.

The FRBM Review Committee of 2016 has been the largest review of the FRBM Act to date. The committee consisted of a large team of domain experts, consultants, experts from the private sector as well as representatives from the state governments. The committee submitted its report to the finance minister on 23 January 2017. The report was submitted three months after its government-recommended deadline of 31 October 2016. The report of the review committee is presently being reviewed by the government of India. The report of the 2017 FRBM Review Committee has positively received by the government and private sector with several articles and opinion pieces appearing in the media subsequently after the report was released in the public domain on 14 April 2017. In the Budget Speech of 2017, Finance Minister Arun Jaitley deviated from his earlier fiscal consolidation road map by pegging fiscal deficit at 3.2% of gross domestic product (GDP) for 2017–18, deferring the 3% of GDP target by a year. He mentioned the recommendations of the FRBM Review Committee Report being taken into consideration while keeping the targets for both Fiscal Deficit and Revenue Deficit. The government has also reduced revenue deficit to 2.1% of GDP in 2016–17 from the budget estimate of 2.3% of GDP and has pegged it at 1.9% of GDP for 2017–18 from 2% of GDP as mandated by the Fiscal Responsibility and Budget Management Act. Chief Economic Advisor Arvind Subramanian, who was also a member of the FRBM Review Committee, has published his own dissent note in Annexure 5 of the report submitted to the Government of India.

The report submitted is accessible on the website of the Department of Economic Affairs under the Ministry of Finance. It consists of 10 chapters, 4 volumes and 6 annexures:

Chapters

Chapter 1 - Introduction

Chapter 2 - Historical Perspective

Chapter 3 - International Experience

Chapter 4 - A 21st Century Debt & Fiscal Paradigm

Chapter 5 - Partnering The States

Chapter 6 - Anatomy of Credit

Chapter 7 - Fiscal Council

Chapter 8 - Escape Clauses

Chapter 9 - Other Issues

Chapter 10 - Summary of Recommendations

Annexures
Annexure 1 - Debate of the Constituent Assembly
Annexure 2 - Draft Statement of Objects & Reasons for the Debt Management and Fiscal Responsibility Bill, 2017
Annexure 3 - Draft Debt Management & Fiscal Responsibility Bill, 2017
Annexure 4 - Draft Debt Management & Fiscal Responsibility Rules, 2017
Annexure 5 - Note of Dissent by Dr. Arvind Subramanian
Annexure 6 - Rejoinder of the Committee to the Note of Dissent

Composition of the committee

Members
Mr N. K. Singh - Chairman
Dr Urjit Patel
Dr Rathin Roy
Mr Sumit Bose
Dr Arvind Subramanian

Government officers
Mr Srinivasan Ramanathan Raja, Undersecretary
Mr Prashant Goyal, Joint Secretary (Budget)
Mr Naresh Mohan Jha, Director (Budget)
Mr L. Sidharth Singh, Director - Comptroller and Auditor General of India
Mr Rangeet Ghosh, Officer on Special Duty to the Chief Economic Advisor
Mr Kapil Patidar, Deputy Director
Mr Syed Zubair Husain Noqvi, Deputy Director
Mr Sunil Chaudhary, Deputy Director

Specialist Advisors
Dr Prachi Mishra, Reserve Bank of India
Dr Subhash Chandra Pandey, IAAS

Domain Experts
Mr Sajjid Z Chinoy, Chief Economist JP Morgan
Mr Neelkanth Mishra, India Equity Strategist Credit Suisse
Mr S Gurumurthy
Mr Chetan Ahya
Mr Ashish Gupta
Mr Kush Shah
Mr Martin Wolf
Mr Francesco Giavazzi
Mr Michael Boskin
Mr Ananya Kotia

Consultants
Mr Joshua Felman
Mr S. Gopalakrishnan
Mr Vijayraj Singh
Mr Raj Kumar Hirani

Institutions
The NITI Aayog
Observer Research Foundation
The National Institute of Public Finance & Policy
International Monetary Fund
OECD
VIDHI
