= Mahavir Tyagi =

Indian politician

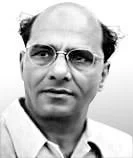
- Mahavir Tyagi

Personal details
- Born: Mahavir Tyagi; 31 December 1899 Dhabarsi, Moradabad, United Provinces, (now in Uttar Pradesh, India)
- Died: 22 May 1980 (aged 80) New Delhi, India
- Party: Indian National Congress

Mahavir Tyagi (31 December 1899 – 22 May 1980) was a prominent Indian independence fighter and parliamentarian from Dehradun, Uttar Pradesh (now in Uttarakhand) India.

== Early life ==
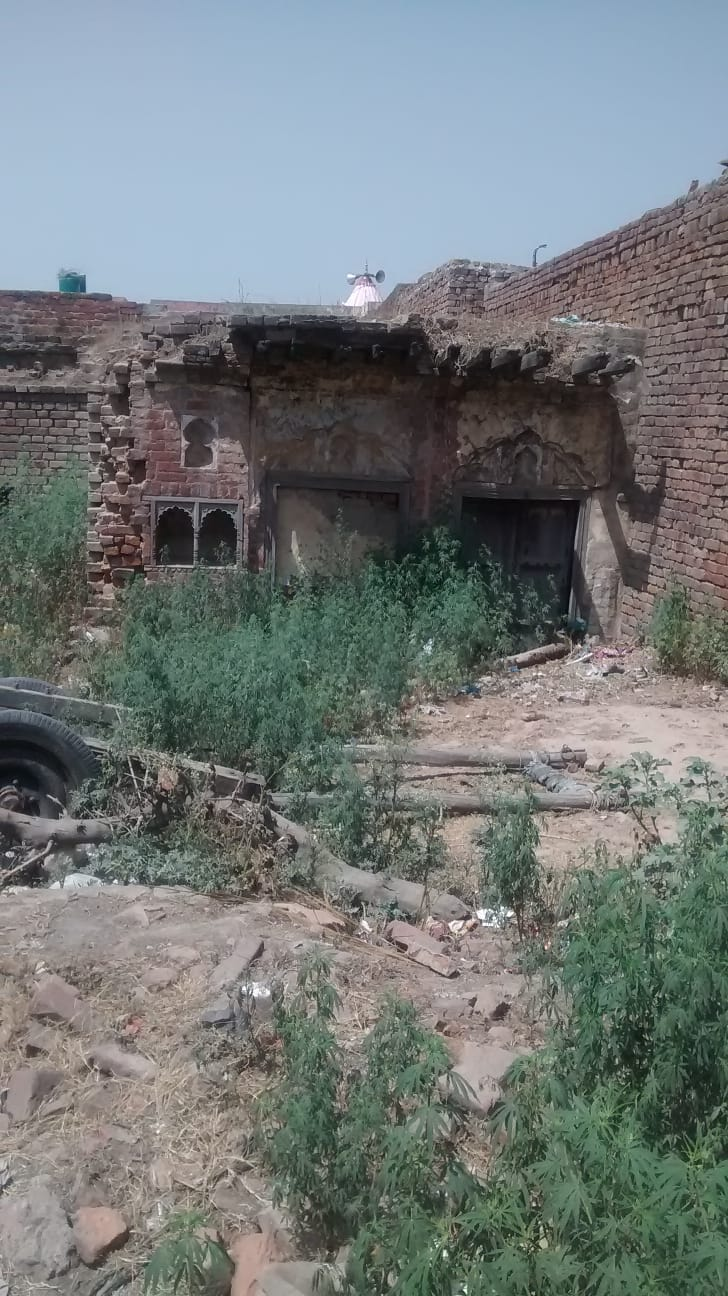
Mahavir Tyagi's childhood home in Dhabarsi, Ghaziabad District in 2023

Tyagi was born on 31 December 1899 at Dhabarsi, now Dhawarsi, in Amroha District in Uttar Pradesh, then known as the United Provinces. (Dhawarsi was earlier in Moradabad District). Tyagi was educated at Meerut, Uttar Pradesh. He joined the British Indian Army and was posted in Persia but resigned after the Jallianwala Bagh Massacre (also known as the Amritsar Massacre), which took place on 13 April 1919. He was court martialed at Quetta, the capital of Baluchistan (now in Pakistan), and expelled from Baluchistan with all pay deposits forfeited. Returning home, Tyagi became a staunch follower of Mahatma Gandhi.

== In the independence movement ==
Mahavir Tyagi, who was active in the Kisan (peasant) movement, remained a lifelong member of the Indian National Congress. Active especially in the Western region of the United Provinces, he was imprisoned by the British eleven times. During the course of the non-co-operation movement in 1921, Mahavir Tyagi was based in Bijnor district. He was tried, inter alia, for sedition under Section 124A of the Indian Penal Code, at Bulandshahr in the United Provinces, now known as Uttar Pradesh. In the course of the trial he was assaulted at the behest of the British Magistrate, WEJ Dobbs. (See Independent, 9 October 1921, Leader, 10 October 1921 and Young India, 13 October 1921) In a series of commentaries on the incident, Mahatma Gandhi condemned the assault on Tyagi. (See Young India, 13, 20, 27 October 1921 and 10 November 1921; Collected Works of Mahatma Gandhi, Volume 21, 1966 (CWMG), pp 284–5, 310–1, 312–3, 344–6, 406–7). A mass protest meeting presided over by Sayed Hassan Berni, Vakil against the Magistrate-directed assault on Tyagi, was held in Bulandshahr with more than 4000 persons attending. Describing the assault as a "crime against the nation", Gandhi asked: "Could for instance the Lord Chief Justice of England assault a prisoner being tried before him and still retain his high office?" The famous editor-poet from Lahore, Zafar Ali Khan, wrote a verse condemning the assault on Mahavir Tyagi. The matter of the magistrate-directed assault on Tyagi figured in the United Provinces Legislative Council on 4 November 1921. Initially evasive answers from the Government regarding the action taken against the magistrate led to further questioning of the Government on 5, 16 and 17 November 1921 in the course of which the Government distanced itself from the magistrate's action. The case was then transferred to the District Magistrate of Meerut, and Tyagi, on being convicted and sentenced to two years' imprisonment, was sent to Agra jail. Even after his release from prison, the seditious Tyagi would remain a marked man for the British regime which had by now identified him as a dangerous opponent. In Uttar Pradesh politics Tyagi was known as a "Rafian", that is, an associate of Rafi Ahmad Kidwai, the famous Indian nationalist Muslim.

Mahavir Tyagi was close to, and had been a jail companion of, the leading Indian nationalist Motilal Nehru, who was Jawaharlal Nehru's father. In the 1920s, Tyagi helped resolve, with the help of Maulana Mohammad Ali, a misunderstanding that had arisen between Motilal Nehru and Jawaharlal Nehru (See Durga Das, India From Curzon to Nehru & After, London, 1969, pp 109–110). Sometime in the mid-1920s, Tyagi made Dehra Dun his political base. Mahavir Tyagi was a delegate to the All Parties National Convention held at Calcutta in December 1928 – January 1929. In a statement issued along with Srinivas Iyengar, Jawaharlal Nehru and others, Tyagi supported the position that the Principles of the Constitution of India drafted by the Motilal Nehru Committee should have been based on independence rather than Dominion Status. On the settlement of communal differences, the statement endorsed the recommendations of the Nehru Report as agreed to by the Lucknow All Parties Conference, held in August 1928. In November 1930, two Nepali activists, Kharag Bahadur and Dhanpati Singh, were arrested at the Delhi Railway station with documents indicating the involvement of Motilal Nehru, Jawaharlal Nehru, Vallabhbhai Patel, Mahavir Tyagi and some other Congress leaders in efforts to alienate the Gurkha soldiers from the British Indian Army. Tyagi was already in prison by this time, having been arrested a few months earlier for his participation in the Civil Disobedience Movement of 1930.

== Political and parliamentary career ==
Tyagi was the President of the Dehradun District Congress Committee in 1931 (See Selected Works of Jawaharlal Nehru, Vol 5, p. 211n). After Tyagi had served out his sentence for participation in the Civil Disobedience Movement of 1930, he was arrested again in Dehradun on 17 January 1932 with the resumption of Civil Disobedience and sentenced to two and a half years' imprisonment (Garhwali, Dehra Dun, 23 January 1932). In the decade before Indian independence he became a legislator in the United Provinces. In this capacity, he was, in 1939, a member of the Jaunsar-Bawar Enquiry Committee which heralded social and land reform in the tribal area of Jaunsar Bawar in Dehradun district of Uttar Pradesh (now part of Uttarakhand state). The committee recommended, inter alia, occupancy rights in land for tenants and the prohibition of forced labour. When arrested at Kalsi in the Individual Satyagraha movement in November 1940, Tyagi was taken to Dehradun Jail where Jawaharlal Nehru was already lodged. (Selected Works of Jawaharlal Nehru, Vol 11, p. 506). In 1942 Tyagi and S K D Paliwal were arrested under the Defence of India Rules on 6 June, that is, more than two months before the Quit India movement was actually launched; Rafi Ahmad Kidwai had been arrested even earlier on 12 May. (Selected Works of Jawaharlal Nehru, Vol 12, p. 344) In a speech at Bombay on 18 June 1942, Nehru condemned these arrests as "putting a hindrance to civil defence work". (Idem) Three years later Nehru, on being transferred from the Ahmadnagar Fort Prison to jails in the United Provinces in the summer of 1945, would see Tyagi again, then a political prisoner at Bareilly Central Jail. (Selected Works of Jawaharlal Nehru, Vol 13, p. 618)

While he himself adhered to Gandhian non-violence, Mahavir Tyagi had close contacts even among the "revolutionaries", that is those who were not opposed to using violent means to overthrow the imperial state. These included Ashfaqullah, Ram Prasad Bismil, Sachindra Nath Sanyal, Prem Kishan Khanna and Vishnu Sharan Dublish. Sachindranath Sanyal writes in his autobiography, (Bandi Jivana, p. 253), that in the 1920s, Dublish had introduced him to Mahavir Tyagi who in turn put him in touch with Ram Prasad Bismil and Ashfaqullah. (See also N C Mehrotra and Poonam Sharma, Uttar Pradesh Mein Krantikari Aandolan Ka Etihas, p. 62 and p. 67, note 8)

When riots broke out in the Indian subcontinent after its partition in 1947, Tyagi, taking inspiration from Gandhi, staked his own life to help save Muslims in his home state and to bring peace. (Choudhry Khaliquzzaman, Pathway To Pakistan, Lahore, 1961, p. 400; see also Ansar Harvani, Before Freedom and After, New Delhi, 1989, p. 100 and Qazi Jalil Abbasi's account in Bipan Chandra, The Epic Struggle, New Delhi, 1992, p. 60) For a further account of how Mahavir Tyagi took over the local administration at this time after he found that it was ineffective in controlling the situation and restoring public order, see Ajit Prasad Jain, Rafi Ahmad Kidwai: A Memoir of his Life and Times, Bombay, 1965, pp 73–74.

Tyagi's political activities extended also to the Tehri Garhwal region. He had taken a keen interest in the movement for democratic rights there and played a prominent role also in support of the movement in Tehri State for merger with independent India. (See, for example, Ajay Singh Rawat, Garhwal Himalayas: A Historical Survey, New Delhi, 1983, p. 205)

Mahavir Tyagi was a member of the Constituent Assembly of India. In this capacity he is known especially for his strong stand against unsafeguarded Preventive Detention laws and against the suspension of fundamental rights in emergency situations. He stood for a fair and independent judiciary. "The seat of justice is the Seat of God", he had famously told the Constituent Assembly. (Granville Austin, The Indian Constitution: Cornerstone of A Nation, Oxford University Press, Bombay, 1966, p. 164). He was sceptical of international arbitration Article 51 (d) of the Constitution, a part of the Directive Principles, which he believed could lead to ceding sovereignty. He opposed the notion of separate electorates, and, as a Gandhian, was a proponent of the non-exclusionary Indian view of Sarva Dharma Sambhava . He was close also to leaders of Indian nationalist organisations of other religions such as the Jamiat Ulama Hind. (See, for instance, D.R.Goyal, Maulana Husain Ahmad Madni: A Biographical Study, Anamika Publishers, New Delhi, 2004 and Qazi Mohammad Adil Abbasi, Aspects of Politics and Society : Memoirs of a Veteran Congressman, Marwah Publications, New Delhi, 1981)) On India's becoming a Republic in 1950, Tyagi remained a member of the Provisional Parliament (1950–52), and the Lower House of the Indian Parliament, that is, the First, Second and Third Lok Sabhas (1952–67) from Dehradun. Tyagi was Minister for Revenue & Expenditure in the Nehru Council of Ministers (1951–53). In this capacity he introduced the First Voluntary Disclosure Scheme, known as the Tyagi Scheme, primarily, as he put it, to bring into the open incomes which had not been revealed to the alien government prior to independence. While in the Ministry of Finance, Tyagi earned a reputation as a strict economiser. His practical, man-of-the-soil approach was reflected also at the first meeting of the National Development Council, held in Delhi on 8 and 9 November 1952, where Tyagi suggested that "manual work should be made part of the daily curriculum of education".(Summary Record of Discussions of the National Development Council, NDC, Meetings: Five Decades of Nation Building, Vol 1, Government of India, Planning Commission, 2005, p. 9)

Later, Mahavir Tyagi became Minister for Defence Organisation (1953–57). In this capacity, he encouraged the process of indigenisation in production and also the complete Indianisation of the Indian Armed Forces. He inaugurated INS Garuda, the air arm of the Indian Navy. He also initiated the project for the manufacture of the HF-24 Marut, which would be the first fighter plane to be produced by a developing country. His statement in October 1955 that India would purchase defence equipment "from any country, wherever it suits her" and that India was "not tied down to any country or bloc", attracted attention from around the world. ("India Declares Intention to Buy Arms Anywhere", The Canberra Times, 6 October 1955). In policies and in the implementation of laws and rules, Tyagi emphasised the human element, advising officers "not to forget the human element when interpreting the rules and regulations". (Archives of speech on 10 July 1955 at Ordnance Factory, Ishapore, reproduced in Sainik Samachar, Vol 51, No. 13, 1–15 July 2004). General B M Kaul records in his memoirs that as Minister of Defence Organisation, Tyagi opposed policy proposals involving draconian measures in the tribal areas of India's North East. (See B M Kaul, The Untold Story, New Delhi, 1967, p. 162) Tyagi also gave instructions for the recruitment of Muslims in large numbers in the Indian Army. The proportion of Muslims in the Army had fallen after the Partition of India in 1947.

Known for his independence, Tyagi opposed, even while he was a minister, the reorganisation of Indian states on a linguistic basis which was, however, ultimately carried out in 1956. (Indian Express, Madras, 24 November 1955) He welcomed the victory of the Communist Party of India in Kerala in the General Elections of 1957 (Leader, Allahabad, 2 April 1957). Later Tyagi opposed the decision to dismiss the Communist government led by EMS Namboodiripad in Kerala at the end of the fifties, saying that this would establish a wrong precedent. A political scientist records in a significant study that Tyagi warned at the time "that the Congress Party was 'digging its own grave' by aligning with caste and communal forces". (B D. Dua, Presidential Rule in India 1950–1974: A Study in Crisis Politics, New Delhi, 1979, p. 112) Tyagi sought also to inculcate independence in others: He was critical of the tendency among political workers obsequiously to touch their leaders' feet and lashed out also at some senior bureaucrats who, he observed, had started touching ministers' feet. (Touching of Leaders' Feet: Tyagi Deplores Tendency, The Tribune, Ambala, 26 June 1959) At the 1957 session of the All India Congress Committee (AICC), Tyagi suggested abandoning the practice of the Congress President nominating all the members of the Congress Working Committee. Though his suggestion that 10 out of the 21 Working Committee members ought to be elected was not accepted, Jawaharlal Nehru agreed with Tyagi that the same members ought not to be re-nominated year after year. (Economic Weekly, 7 September 1957)

Tyagi was Chairman of the Direct Taxes Administration Enquiry Committee (1958–59) and in that capacity paved the way, along with the Law Commission, for the Income Tax Act, 1961.

=== Aksai Chin debate ===
On 5 December 1961, a year before the Sino-Indian war, Nehru made statements in the Indian Parliament. Nehru had commented on Aksai Chin: "Not a blade of grass grows there, 17,000 feet high, inhabitable and we didn't even know where it was." Tyagi retorted, pointing to his own bald head: "No hair grows on my head. Does it mean that the head has no value?". A tense situation that had been developing in the House on the subject of the border conflict was averted as the House dissolved in laughter in which Nehru also joined. Tyagi continued to enjoy an affectionate relationship with Jawaharlal Nehru. He served as the Chairman of the Public Accounts Committee of the Parliament (1962–64).

=== Correspondence with Jawaharlal Nehru ===
As a jail companion of both Motilal Nehru and of Jawaharlal Nehru, to both of whom Tyagi had been close, Tyagi expressed himself freely within the Congress; his extensive correspondence with Jawaharlal Nehru, lodged in the Nehru Memorial Museum and Library (now Prime Minister's Memorial Museum and Library), provides several instances of this. On 31 January 1959 Tyagi had written a strong letter to Jawaharlal Nehru advising him against acceding to the proposal made by some Chief Ministers that Indira Gandhi be elected President of the Indian National Congress. Tyagi advised Nehru to avoid this or, if he considered the idea desirable, to himself step aside as Prime Minister. (See Selected Works of Jawaharlal Nehru, Second Series, Volume 46, pp. 270–272, pp. 668–672)

Likewise, in October 1963, when PM Nehru was considering the inclusion of M. C. Chagla, who was not at the time a member of the Congress, as a cabinet minister, Tyagi advised Nehru against doing so, because he felt it could alienate long time party members. Later, after watching Chagla's performance for some time, Tyagi realised that he had been mistaken in opposing Chagla's inclusion in the Cabinet. Tyagi then called on Chagla to make amends and characteristically himself handed to Chagla the letter he had written to Jawaharlal Nehru in October 1963 and also the latter's reply lauding Chagla. (See M C Chagla, Roses in December, Bharatiya Vidya Bhavan, Bombay, 1990, p. 339 and pp. 528–531).

=== Later career ===
In April 1964, a month before Nehru's death, Tyagi rejoined the Government as the Cabinet Minister in charge of Rehabilitation. In the General Elections of 1967 which saw a popular backlash against the Congress Party, Tyagi lost to an independent candidate backed by an anti-Congress combination of parties.

In 1968, Mahavir Tyagi became the Chairman of the Fifth Finance Commission. After the split in the Congress in 1969, Tyagi stayed with the Congress (O), the organisational wing of the party. In 1970 he was elected to the Upper House of Parliament, the Rajya Sabha, from Uttar Pradesh and led the Congress (O) in the House till he retired in 1976. Tyagi's being in the Congress (O) did not prevent him from being critical of the movement led by Jayaprakash Narayan in 1974–75. He was equally critical of the Emergency imposed by Prime Minister Indira Gandhi in 1975. Mahavir Tyagi died in New Delhi on 22 May 1980. A popular figure, he had friends across political parties and was widely admired for his integrity, outspokenness, ready wit and sense of humour.

== Works ==
Before independence, Mahavir Tyagi had written a booklet on proportional representation. His memoirs in Hindustani were published in the 1960s in two volumes:

- Ve Kranti Ke Din
- Meri Kaun Sunega.

These volumes have now been combined in one and, along with some other unpublished articles by Tyagi, have been published under the title Azadi Ka Andolan: Hanste Hue Ansu (Kitab Ghar, 24 Ansari Road, Daryaganj, Delhi).

== Legacy ==
Pranab Mukherjee, who was the President of India from 2012 to 2017, noted in his farewell speech he had witnessed brilliant orators during his 37 years as a member in both Houses of Parliament. Among these orators, he mentioned Tyagi, Bhupesh Gupta, Ajit Prasad Jain, Jairamdas Daulatram among others.

== See also ==
- The Collected Works of Mahatma Gandhi, Vol 21, Publications Division, Government of India, New Delhi, 1966
- Selected Works of Motilal Nehru, Vol 6, Ravinder Kumar and Hari Dev Sharma (eds.), Vikas Publishing House, New Delhi, 1995
- India From Curzon to Nehru And After, Durga Das, Collins, London, 1969
- Nepal and the Indian Nationalist Movement, Kanchanmoy Mojumdar, Firma K L Mukhopadhyay, Calcutta, 1975
- Selected Works of Jawaharlal Nehru, Vols 5, 11, 12, and 13, S. Gopal (Gen. Ed.), Orient Longman, New Delhi, 1973–1980
- Selected Works of Jawaharlal Nehru,(Second Series), Vols 46, 73, Madhavan K. Palat (Ed.), Jawaharlal Nehru Memorial Fund, New Delhi, 2012-2017
- Pathway to Pakistan, Choudhry Khaliquzzaman, Longmans, Lahore, 1961
- Before Freedom And After, Ansar Harvani, Gian Publishing House, New Delhi, 1989
- The Epic Struggle, Bipan Chandra, Orient Longman, New Delhi, 1992
- Rafi Ahmad Kidwai, Dr. M. Hashim Kidwai (Publications Division, Government of India, New Delhi), 1986
- Rafi Ahmad Kidwai : A Memoir of His Life and Times, Ajit Prasad Jain, Asia Publishing House, Bombay, 1965
- Himalayan Polyandry : Structure, Functioning and Culture Change , D. N. Majumdar, Asia Publishing House, Bombay, 1962
- Garhwal Himalayas : A Historical Survey, Ajay S. Rawat, Eastern Book Linkers, New Delhi, 1983
- The Indian Constitution : Cornerstone of A Nation, Granville Austin, Oxford University Press, Bombay, 1966
- Summary Record of Discussions of the National Development Council Meetings, Planning Commission, Delhi, 2005
- Presidential Rule in India 1950–1974 : A Study in Crisis Politics, B.D.Dua, S.Chand & Company, New Delhi, 1979
- Distinguished Acquaintances, (Vol 2), N G Ranga, Desi Book Distributors, Vijayawada, 1976
- Uttar Pradesh Mein Krantikari Aandolan Ka Etihas, N C Mehrotra and Poonam Sharma, Atmaram & Sons, Delhi, 2017
- Bandi Jivana, Sachindra Nath Sanyal, Delhi, 1986
- The Untold Story, Gen B.M. Kaul, Allied Publishers, New Delhi, 1967
- Qazi Mohammad Adil Abbasi, Aspects of Politics and Society : Memoirs of a Veteran Congressman, Marwah Publications, New Delhi, 1981
- D.R.Goyal, Maulana Husain Ahmad Madni: A Biographical Study, Anamika Publishers, New Delhi, 2004
- M C Chagla, Roses in December, Bharatiya Vidya Bhavan, Bombay, 1990
