= Ninth Finance Commission =

1987 finance commission of India

The Ninth Finance Commission of India was set up in June 1987 under the chairmanship of Mr. N.K.P Salve.

== Members ==
The members of the Commission were:

- Shri N.K.P. Salve, Chairman
- Shri Justice Abdus Sattar Qureshi
- Dr. Raja J. Chelliah
- Shri Lal Thanhawla, resigned on 24 January 1989
- Shri Mahesh Prasad, Member Secretary, resigned during the term of the Commission
- Shri S. Venkitaramanan, joined in place of Shri Lal Thanhawla on 3 May 1989
- Shri Venkitaramanan, resigned as Member of the Finance Commission on his appointment as Adviser to the Government of Karnataka
- Shri R. Keishing, assumed charge as part-time Member of the Commission with effect from 25 November 1989.
- Shri K.V.R. Nair, appointed as Member Secretary in place of Shri Mahesh Prasad from 13 July 1989

=== Terms of Reference ===
The Commission was asked to adopt a normative approach in assessing the receipts and the expenditures on the revenue account not only of the states but also of the centre with due regard to the special problems of each state and the special requirement of the central government. Generating surpluses on revenue account of both the states and centre for capital investment should also be considered. Changes in the principles that govern the distribution between the union and the states and also the states inter-se of the net proceeds of central taxes are to be made

The commission will also make recommendations regarding the principles which should govern the grants in aid of the revenue of the state out of the Consolidated Fund of India. It is to assess the debt position of the states as on 31 March 1989 and suggest corrective measures. In regard to the financing of the relief expenditure by the states affected by natural calamities the commission is to examine the feasibility of establishing a National Insurance Fund to which the state governments may contribute a percentage of their revenue receipts. The government's decision to accept all the major recommendations of this commission which would bring substantial benefits to the state during the eighth five-year plan period (especially in relation to debt relief) shows the upper hand enjoyed by this body.

=== Recommendations ===
- Income Tax – 85% of the divisible pool of the income tax to be assigned to the state and out of the net distributable proceeds a sum equal to 1.437% should be deemed to represent the proceeds attributable to the Union Territories.
- Relief Funds – The existing arrangements to be replaced by a new order under which the states will have greater autonomy and accountability. A calamity relief fund to be constituted for each state to which contribution is to be made in the ratio 75:25 (centre: state).
- Debt Relief – The Commission recommended that the Reserve Bank of India may work out a formula for amortization of the states’ market borrowings. From 1990 to 1991 the direct central loans for states’ plans should have a maturity period of 20 years with 50% of the loans enjoying a grace period of 5 years. The loans given to the federating states for drought relief during 1986–89 as outstanding on 31 March 1989 are to be waived. The state plan loans advance to the states during the 1984–89 period and outstanding on 31 March 1990 should be consolidated, rescheduled to 15 years in the case of all the states.
