= Twelfth Finance Commission =

2002 finance commission of India

The Twelfth Finance Commission of India was appointed on 1 November 2002 to make recommendations on the distribution of net proceeds of sharable taxes between union and states. The commission was headed by veteran economist of India, C. Rangarajan. The commission submitted its report on 30 November 2004 and covered the period from 2005 to 2010.

== Members ==
The members of the commission were:

- C. Rangarajan, Chair
- T.R Prasad, IAS (retired)
- D.K Srivastava
- Som Pal, part time Member, resigned 14 May 2004
- Shankar N. Acharya, part time Member, replacing Som Pal from 2 July 2004

== Terms of Reference ==
The commission was asked to make recommendations on the following matters:

1. The distribution of net proceed of taxes between union and states which are to be divided under chapter 1 part 12 of the constitution.
2. The policies required to increase the consolidated fund of states on the basis of recommendation made by the finance commission of states to supplement the resources of municipalities and panchayats in the state.

In making the recommendation, the commission was asked to pay regard to

1. The resources of the union government and state government for five years starting from 1 April 2005 on the basis of the total tax and non-tax that it will likely to receive by the end of 2003–04.
2. The demand of the resources by the central government, in particular the need of expenditure on civil administration, internal security, defence, debt servicing and other committed expenditure and liabilities.

== Major recommendations ==
- Macro-economic stability: the total fiscal deficit for centre and states to be reduced to 3% of GDP and the total tax-GDP ratio of both centre and states to be increased to 17.6% of GDP in 2009–10. The revenue deficit for the centre and states combined to be reduced to 0% by 2008.
- Distribution of Union Tax: the total share of states in the total sharable central taxes to be fixed at 30.5% and the share of states will come down to 29.5% if the states levy sales tax on sugar, textiles and tobacco.
- Grants to local bodies: the total grant that will have to be given to the states for panchayati raj institutions and local urban bodies for the period of 2005-09 will be Rs 20000 crores and Rs 5000 crores respectively.
- Calamity relief fund: the calamity relief fund scheme will continue as it was in the previous plans with central and states contributing in the ratio of 75: 25. The size of fund will be Rs 21333 crore for the period of 2005–10.
- Grant in aids to the states: for the period of 2005–10, the total non-plan revenue deficit grant of Rs 56856 crores is recommended to 15 states and the total grant of Rs 10172 is recommended for 8 educationally backward states. A grant of Rs 15000 crores is recommended for building roads and bridges which is in addition to the normal expenditure of the states while the grants that are recommended to the states for maintenance of public buildings, forests, heritage conservation and specific needs of states are Rs 500 crore, Rs 100 crore, Rs 625 crore and Rs 7100 crore.
