= National Council of Applied Economic Research =

Indian think tank

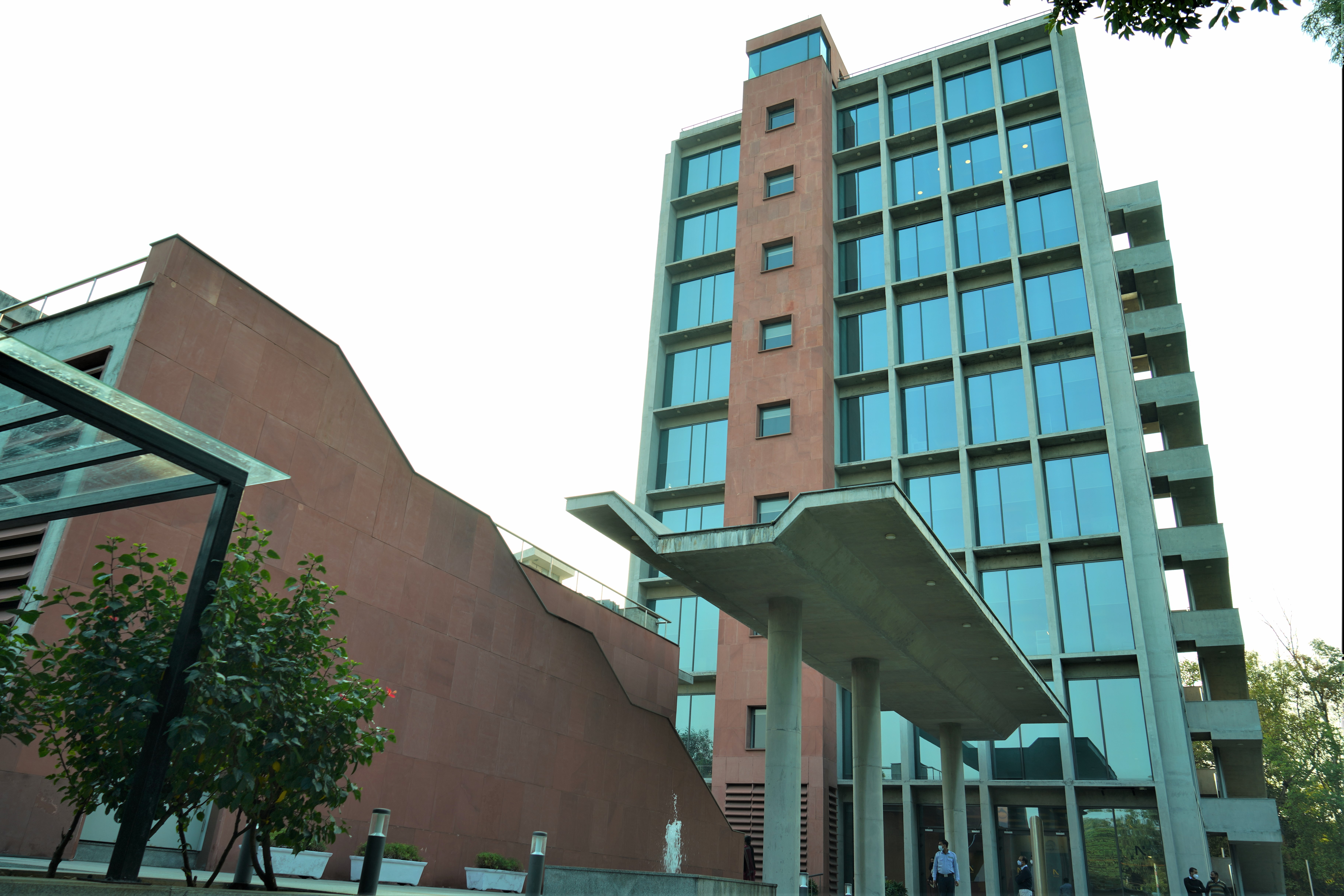
- John Matthai Tower
- Abbreviation: NCAER
- Formation: 1956; 70 years ago
- Type: Non-profit think tank
- Headquarters: 11, Indraprastha Estate, New Delhi
- Location: New Delhi, India
- President: Nandan M. Nilekani
- Website: https://www.ncaer.org

National Council of Applied Economic Research (NCAER) is India’s oldest and largest independent, non-profit, economic policy research think tank. Established in New Delhi in 1956, it acquired considerable national and international standing within only a few decades of its founding. It is one of a handful of think tanks globally that combine rigorous analysis and policy outreach with deep data collection capabilities, especially for household surveys.

== History ==
The genesis of the institution can be traced back to 1956, when the Indian experience in building up data bases relevant to the economy was just being given a firm foundation. T. T. Krishnamachari, then a Minister in Union Cabinet, held talks with Douglas Ensminger, the Ford Foundation’s head for India, to discuss the broad outline of a plan to set up an institution of economic research to get independent and reliable data and analysis for establishing priorities, allocating resources and evaluating performance. He then wrote to J. R. D. Tata with his idea for "an institute for research on economic and industrial problems." J. R. D. accepted the offer of becoming a sponsor.

The first meeting of the Governing Body of the Council for Industrial and Economic Research (as it was originally called) was held in the office of the then Planning Commission’s Deputy Chairman, V. T. Krishnamachari, in May 1956. At this meeting, C. D. Deshmukh, Union Finance Minister, who was also the first Indian Governor of the Reserve Bank of India, proposed that Parliamentarians be approached for the adoption of a resolution describing the proposed Council as a 'Centre of national importance.' Apart from T. T. Krishnamachari, J. R. D. Tata, V. T. Krishnamachari, and C. D. Deshmukh, NCAER founder’s panel also included John Matthai, the first Finance Minister of the Republic of India, Chairman of State Bank of India, Vice-Chancellor of Bombay University, and also a distinguished economist; N. R. Pillai, the first Cabinet Secretary of independent India; J. F. Sinclair, a technocrat who headed India’s premier private sector oil giant at that time, the Burma Shell Company, and, Asoka Mehta, a Member of Parliament and distinguished economist.

In August 1956, P. S. Lokanathan was designated as the first Director General of the Council and name of the institution was changed to its present name, the National Council of Applied Economic Research.

== Leadership ==
=== Governing Board ===
The first Governing Board of NCAER included all Economics Ministers and leading lights of the private sector, such as C. D. Deshmukh, J. R. D. Tata, John Matthai, N. R. Pillai, J. F. Sinclair, and Asoka Mehta. Since then, its Governing Body have included almost every prominent Indian economist, policy maker, and industry leaders, including former Prime Minister Manmohan Singh as a member during 1976–82, and Ratan Tata as President during 1994–98. The current Governing Body of NCAER is headed by Nandan M. Nilekani, Non-Executive Chairman of the Infosys Board Bengaluru, former Chairman, Unique Identification Authority of India, New Delhi, and Co-Founder and former CEO, Infosys Ltd.

NCAER Governing Board:

- Nandan M. Nilekani (President)
- Manish Sabharwal (Vice-President)
- Mukesh D. Ambani (Member)
- Ashish Dhawan (Member)
- Deepak S. Parekh (Member)
- Ajay Seth (Member)
- Anuradha Thakur (Member)
- Ireena Vittal (Member)
- Sanjiv Puri (Member)
- Anil Rai Gupta (Member)
- Falguni Nayar (Member)
- Sandeep Singhal (Member)
- Anil K. Sharma (Secretary to the NCAER Governing Body)

Former NCAER Presidents:

- John Matthai (1956—59)
- V. T. Krishnamachari (1959—1964)
- Asoka Mehta (1964—1981)
- Prakash Tandon (1981—1992)
- Bimal Jalan (1992—1994)
- Lovraj Kumar (1993—1994)
- Ratan N. Tata (1994—1998)
- Bimal Jalan (1998—2008)

=== Director General ===
Since January 2026, the Director General of NCAER is Suresh Goyal, he has over 30 years of experience across the private and public sectors. He joins NCAER after his assignment as the Managing Director and CEO of the National Highway Infra Trust (NHIT), which was set up by the Ministry of Road Transport & Highways and the National Highways Authority of India to support the National Monetisation Pipeline. Starting as the first employee in 2020, Mr Suresh Goyal built NHIT into one of the largest road platforms, with an enterprise value of ~INR 48,000 crore, thereby contributing significantly to the government’s monetisation agenda. He successfully managed multiple stakeholders, including a 10-member board comprising government, institutions, and independent directors, steering NHIT to deliver consistent performance. Before moving to the government role, Mr Goyal had spent his career in the private sector, with his last stint at Macquarie Infrastructure & Real Assets as Senior Managing Director and Head of India and South-East Asia, based in Singapore.

Former Director Generals of NCAER:

- P. S. Lokanathan (1956—1967)
- S. Boothalingam (1967—1974)
- M. V. Mathur (1974—1975)
- P. L. Tandon (1975—1981)
- I. Z. Bhatty (1981—1990)
- S. L. Rao (1990—1996)
- Rakesh Mohan (1996—2000)
- Suman Bery (2001—2011)
- Shekhar Shah (2011—2021)
- Poonam Gupta (2021—2025)

=== Research Advisory Board ===
The Research Advisory Board of NCAER includes eminent research and policy practitioners and academics. The Board is headed by Dr Surjit Bhalla, Executive Director for India, Sri Lanka, Bangladesh, and Bhutan at the IMF and NCAER Governing Body member.

NCAER Research Advisory Board Members:

- Surjit S. Bhalla (Chair)
- Junaid Ahmed (Member)
- Sonalde Desai (Member)
- Indermit Gill (Member)
- Neelkanth Mishra (Member)
- Arvind Panagariya (Member)
- Nirvikar Singh (Member)

== Notable Scholars and Policy Makers ==
Scholars and policy makers include Former Finance Secretary and Deputy Governor of Reserve Bank of India, Rakesh Mohan; Deputy Governor of Reserve Bank of India Subir Gokarn; Members of the Economic Council Advisory of the Prime Minister Rakesh Mohan, Suman Bery, and Poonam Gupta; Member of RBI’s Monetary Policy Committee Shashanka Bhide, NCAER’s faculty. Senior Faculty members of NCAER have been routinely involved in contributing to national and state-level policymaking through their direct participation in government nominated committees, commissions, and task forces. A few faculty members have also been senior newspaper editors and columnists.

== Research Areas ==
NCAER’s research is organized around the following thematic areas:

- National Growth & Macroeconomic Centre;
- Human Development & Data Innovation;
- Investor Education and Protection Fund Chair Unit;
- Computable General Equilibrium Modelling and Policy Analysis;
- States, Sectors, Surveys, and Impact Evaluation;
- Agriculture, Industry, Trade, Technology & Skills;
- Centre for Health Policy and Systems;
- Centre for Gender and Macroeconomy; and
- Centre for States Economic Growth (CSEG).

NCAER faculty generate and analyze empirical evidence to support and inform public policy choices in these areas. In 2017, NCAER established the NCAER National Data Innovation Centre. This Centre primarily serves as a laboratory for experiments in data collection, interfacing with partners in think tanks, Indian and international universities, and government.

NCAER’s future agenda includes providing research and evidence based policy solutions in helping to understand India’s rapid economic and social transformation as newer and more complex economic challenges emerge.

They also feature a scholarly journal in collaboration with Sage Publications called Margin: The Journal of Applied Economic Research.

== Flagship Events ==
=== India Policy Forum ===
Established in 2004, the India Policy Forum (IPF) is the National Council of Applied Economic Research's (NCAER) annual conference focused on empirical economic research. The event is attended by policymakers and academic researchers to discuss current economic challenges in India. The proceedings are published in the India Policy Forum journal, which focuses on Indian economic policy.

=== C. D. Deshmukh Lectures ===
The annual C.D. Deshmukh Memorial Lecture at NCAER was instituted in 2013 to honour the memory of one of India’s most eminent economists and a founding father of NCAER. Chintaman Dwarakanath Deshmukh was the first Indian to be appointed Governor of the Reserve Bank of India in 1943, was part of the official Indian delegation to the 1944 Bretton Woods Conference that led to the creation of the World Bank and the International Monetary Fund, and served as Governor of RBI until 1949. He served as the Union Finance Minister during 1950 to 1956 and was a founding member of NCAER’s first Governing Body in 1956. The most recent C.D. Deshmukh Lecture titled, ‘The Global Economic Outlook 2021: Averting a Great Divergence’ was delivered by the Chief Economist at the IMF, Gita Gopinath in 2021.

=== NCAER-NBER Neemrana Conference ===
NCAER in collaboration with National Bureau of Economic Research (NBER) started the Neemrana Conference in 1999 to create a forum that focuses on important economic policy issues and brings together prominent policymakers, regulators, industry leaders, and academic luminaries from the best think tanks and universities from India and the US working on policy matters around the world. The informal, off-the-record conversations around complex policy topics remains the hallmark of this one-of-a-kind forum, which has made it as one of the most anticipated events in winter. NCAER organized all Neemrana Conferences for a decade during the period from 1999 to 2007 and was later joined in 2008 by ICRIER as the second Indian partner. Since then NCAER and ICRIER have organized these conference alternatively – one year NCAER and one year ICRIER.

=== Public Affairs and Events ===
Lectures, conferences, seminars, webinars, and symposia are held regularly, which are attended by a large number of eminent academics, policymakers, and researchers within and outside NCAER.

== Publications and Research Outputs ==
NCAER brings out a significant body of publications, including books, journals, reports, monographs, working papers, newsletters, and policy briefs throughout the year. NCAER’s published literature in 2020–21 included one book, 45 reports, nine working papers, a monthly project-based newsletter, and twelve other publications. Selected publications and research outputs are listed below.

- The IPF Conference leads to the publication of the India Policy Forum volume, one of the highest ranked policy journals emanating from the country, also contributing to NCAER’s international recognition and prestige as a knowledge institution.
- Monthly Review of the Economy: This Monthly Review summarises the economic and policy developments in India; monitors global developments of relevance to India; and showcases the pulse of the economy through an analysis of high-frequency indicators.
- Business Expectations Surveys: NCAER has been conducting the BES every quarter since 1991. All the industries across the various regions of India are adequately represented in terms of ownership type, industry sector, and firm size. The BES reports on business sentiments pertaining to the Indian economy receive wide coverage in the print and digital media.
- Opinion and Commentary: Every month, NCAER researchers publish a wide range of opinion articles and research papers in leading dailies and journals on diverse subjects including macro, education, health, gender, data analysis, and social and economic policies and developments in the country.
- Margin: NCAER has been publishing its refereed, international journal Margin: The Journal of Applied Economic Research, for over five decades. This is a quarterly journal devoted to policy analysis and application of modern quantitative techniques in developmental issues on broad areas of applied economics. The journal is published by Sage Publications.

== Campus ==
Initially NCAER operated out of a bungalow in Delhi’s Chanakyapuri locality. The foundation stone of its current iconic campus was laid by India's Prime Minister at the time, Jawaharlal Nehru, and the building named ‘Parisila Bhawan’ was inaugurated by the then President of India, Rajendra Prasad, in March 1961. Designed by the highly-regarded, Harvard-trained architect, A. P. Kanvinde, NCAER’s iconic campus, located in the heart of New Delhi, has been home to some of the best economists, statisticians, journalists, and corporate minds of India. More than six decades after its inauguration, the NCAER campus came up for revival, and the foundation stone for the new NCAER India Centre was laid by India’s former Prime Minister Manmohan Singh on in July 2013. The new buildings - a new officer tower and an auditorium were completed in August 2018. The NCAER India Centre provides a modern, state-of-the-art work environment for NCAER staff and an architectural landmark for New Delhi.
