= New welfarism =

Term describing India's welfare policy

New Welfarism is a doctrine coined by former Indian Chief Economic Advisor Arvind Subramanian to describe the Indian government's unique approach to poverty reduction. It shifts focus away from "intangible" public goods—like basic education and healthcare—and prioritizes the state-funded, subsidized delivery of tangible, private goods directly to vulnerable households.

The core strategy revolves around providing physical assets (like toilets and houses) and essential services (like electricity, cooking gas, and bank accounts). It also encompasses large-scale direct cash transfers and subsidized food grains.

Understanding the model involves looking at its key aspects across a few shared dimensions:

- Core strategy: Focuses on goods that are easy to measure, deliver, and target politically. It skips the long-term, complex process of fixing systemic public education or public hospital networks.
- Key programs: Flagship initiatives associated with this model include Pradhan Mantri Awas Yojana (housing), Swachh Bharat Abhiyan (sanitation), Pradhan Mantri Ujjwala Yojana (LPG cooking gas), and the PM-KISAN cash transfer for farmers.
- Trade-off: Critics, including Subramanian, argue that neglecting public health and education shortchanges long-term human resource development and could hinder India's transition to a high-skilled, knowledge-based economy.
