= Arvind Virmani =

Indian economist

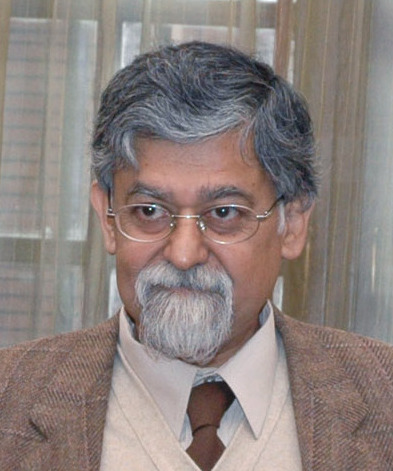

Chairman of EGROW Foundation
- Incumbent
- Assumed office 2026

Full time member of NITI Aayog
- In office 2022 - 2026

Chairman of EGROW Foundation
- In office 2018 - 2022

13th Chief Economic Adviser to the Government of India
- In office 2007 - 2009
- Preceded by: Ashok K Lahiri
- Succeeded by: Kaushik Basu

Personal details
- Born: 22 June 1949 (age 77)
- Education: Delhi University (BSc); Caltech (BS); Harvard University (MA, PhD)
- Profession: Economist

Arvind Virmani (born 22 June 1949) is an Indian economist and founder chairman of EGROW foundation. Previously he was a full time Member of NITI Aayog. He was appointed India's representative to the International Monetary Fund in 2009. Prior to that, he was the Chief Economic Advisor to the Government of India.

== Early life and education ==
Virmani’s parents moved to Delhi’s Jhandewalan area after Partition. He attended St.Columba's School, Delhi in his childhood. Once he turned 11, his father decided to send him to Doon School. He graduated with a degree in Physics from the St. Stephen's College, Delhi and studied Electronics and Economics at California Institute of Technology, following which, he received MA and PhD in economics from Harvard University under the supervision of Kenneth Arrow in 1975.

== Career ==
After receiving a doctorate from Harvard, Virmani moved to New York University for a teaching assignment. He returned to India around the end of Indira Gandhi’s Emergency rule in 1977. He had two job offers. One, he was shortlisted for Reader at the Delhi School of Economics and the other a job with the World Bank. After consulting with Ashok Lahiri, who was second on the panel of shortlisted candidates for the Reader job at DSE, Virmani opted for the latter. After spending nearly 10 years as Senior Economist at World Bank, Virmani returned to India in 1987. He served the government from 1987 in senior positions in the finance ministry and the Planning Commission for over two decades. He worked on various economic policy papers during the 1990s that led to various reforms. He has been an advisor to the Indian Government at the highest levels, including as Principal Advisor, at the Planning Commission and Chief Economic Advisor at, the Ministry of Finance.^{[1]} During his period as the Chief Economic Advisor to the Government of India, Virmani wrote the Economic Survey of India (2008-2009). In 2009, he was appointed as India's representative in the International Monetary Fund (IMF), a position often considered to be a reward for bureaucrats coming close to retirement and that has three years of office. He served as a member of the Technical Advisory Committee of the RBI on Monetary Policy from February 2013 to August 2016.

He was also a Member of the Board of EXIM Bank, Chairman of, Board of Trustees in SBI Mutual Fund, Director of Life Insurance Corporation of India (LIC), Member of the SEBI Appellate Tribunal and Depositories Act Appellate Tribunal, Director of Punjab National Bank, Allahabad Bank and Member of the Board of Trustee in Unit Trust of India.

He is the founder of EGROW Foundation, a non-profit, multi-disciplinary public policy organisation engaged in independent, high-quality research in the areas of macroeconomic policy, public welfare, national security and diplomacy.

He was appointed a full-time member of NITI Aayog in November 2022 and served till March 2026.

== Publications ==
He has published several articles in the areas of Macroeconomics growth and finance, International trade & Tariffs and International relations. From Uni-polar To Tri polar World: Multi-polar Transition Paradox, Propelling India From Socialist Stagnation To Global Power.
