= Indian Economic Service =

Unit of India's central government

Service Overview
- Abbreviation: I.E.S.
- Formed: 1961
- Country: India
- Civil Service academy: Institute of Economic Growth, Delhi
- Controlling authority: Department of Economic Affairs (Economic Division), Ministry of Finance
- Legal personality: Governmental: civil service
- Cadre Size: 477 (2015)

Service Chief
- Chief Economic Adviser to Government of India: V. Anantha Nageswaran

Head of the Civil Services
- Cabinet Secretary: T. V. Somanathan, IAS

The Indian Economic Service (abbreviated as IES, I.E.S.) is an inter-ministerial and inter-departmental central civil service under Group A of the executive branch of the Government of India. A unique aspect of the service is that cadre posts are spread across 55 Union Government ministries and departments. It is a highly specialised professional service within the Government of India catering to economic analysis and policy advice.

== History ==
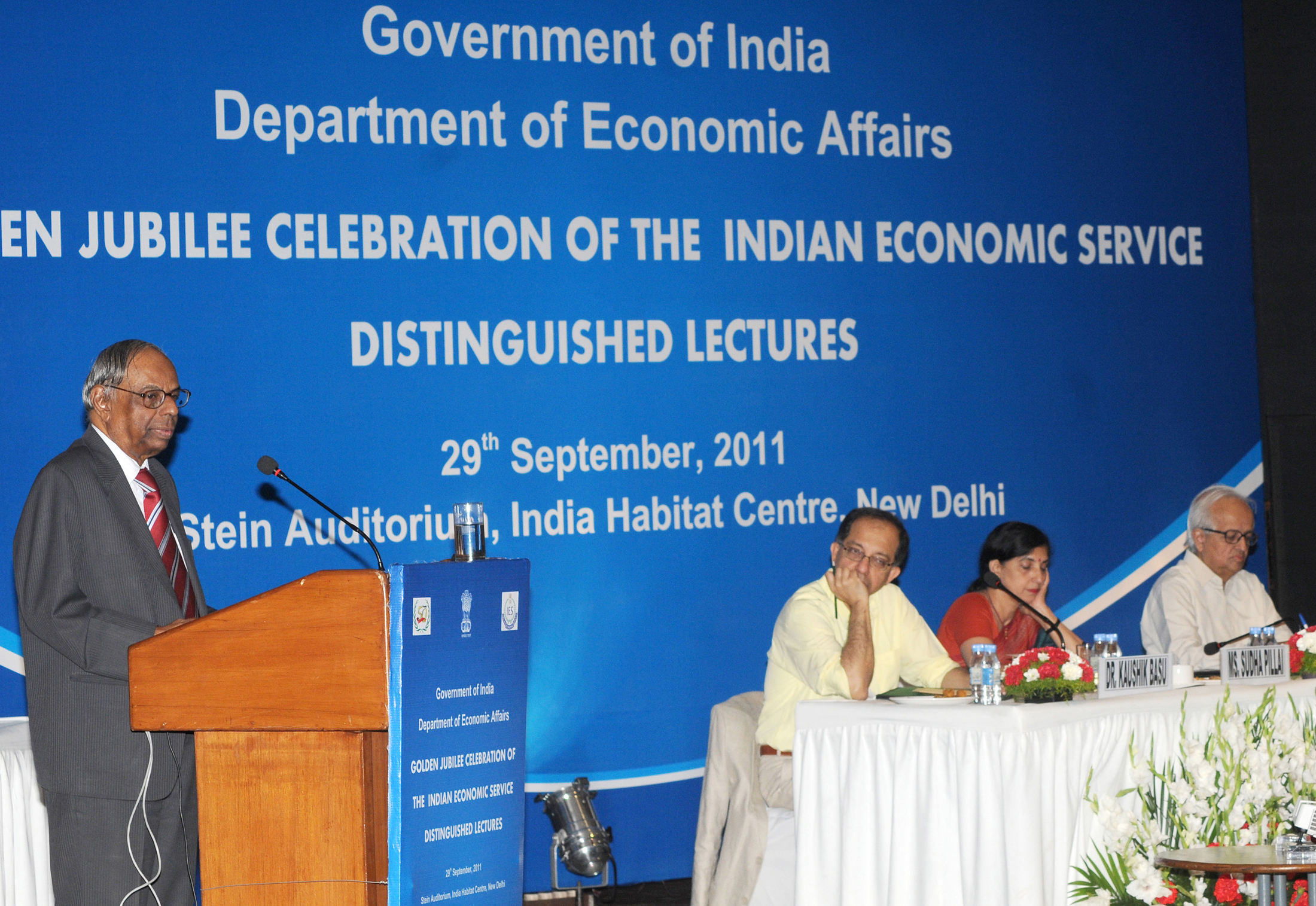
C. Rangarajan addressing at the Distinguished Lectures function on the occasion of the Golden Jubilee Celebrations of the Indian Economic Service in 2011.

The Indian Economic Service was introduced by Prime Minister Jawaharlal Nehru for formulating and implementing economic policies and programmes in India. The initial steps towards formation of service can be traced to 1952. A Committee under V. T. Krishnamachari submitted a report in September 1953, which recommended the formation of a Statistical and Economic Advisory Service. On the contrary, Prasanta Mahalanobis did not favour the idea of a combined Statistical and Economic Advisory Service.

The Cabinet in at a meeting held on 12 February 1958 decided that two separate services should be formed; a Statistical Service and an Economic Service. The Indian Economic Service was constituted on 1 November 1961 and the Service Rules were notified on the same date. The service began operations in 1964.

Until 2009, the post of Chief Economic Advisor to the Government of India was a Union Public Service Commission appointment and until the 1970s almost all CEAs were members of the Indian Economic Service.

== Recruitment ==
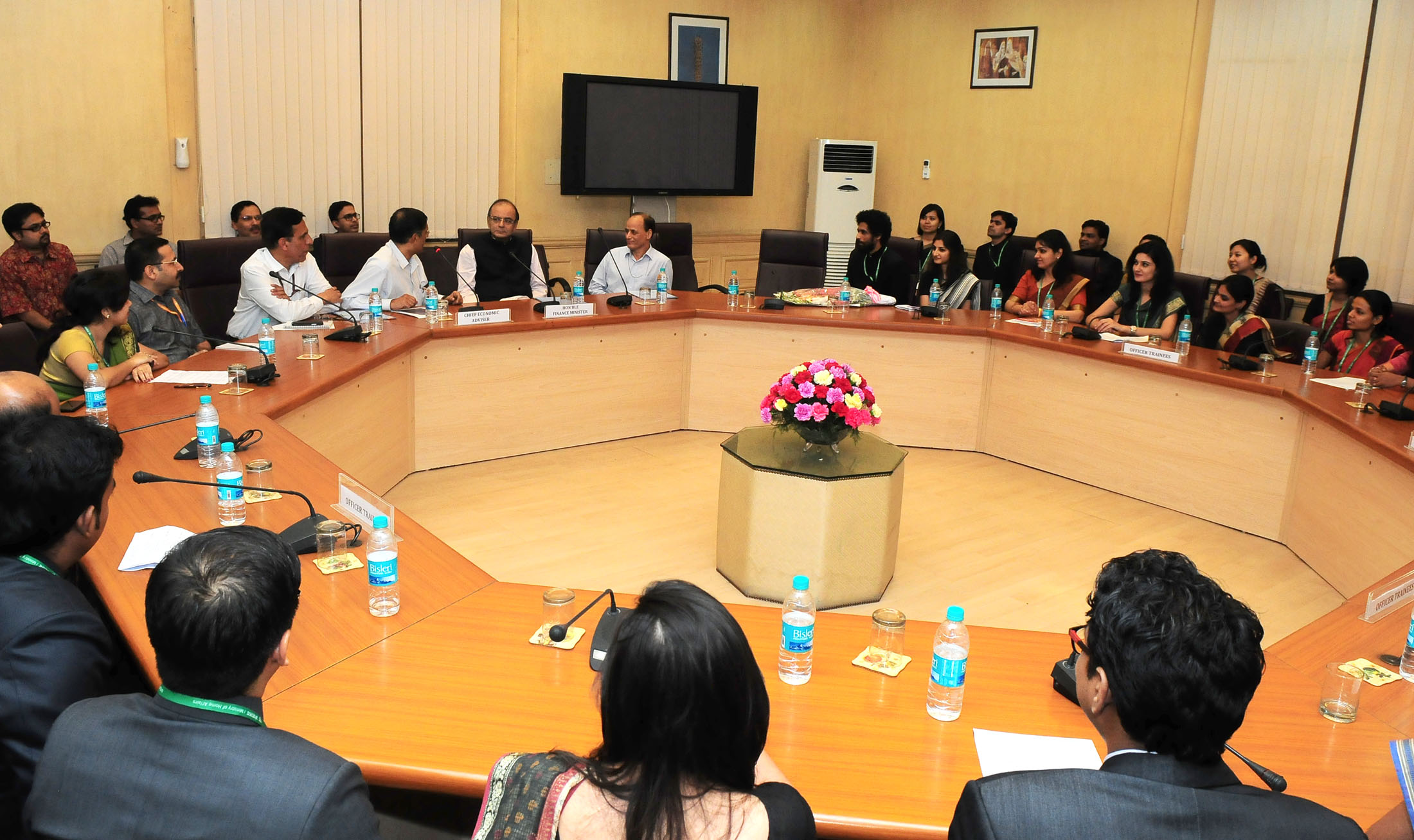
Minister of Finance Arun Jaitley interacting with probationers of IES in 2015.

The UPSC conducts a separate Economics Service exam. The minimum eligibility criterion is a post graduate degree in Economics and allied subjects.

== Position ==
Authorised strength of various grades in the IES
Grade	Strength
Higher Administrative Grade + (HAG +)/ Principal Adviser (Apex)	5
Higher Administrative Grade (HAG)/ Senior Economic Adviser/ Senior Adviser	15
Senior Administrative Grade (SAG)/ Economic Adviser/ Adviser	89
Junior Administrative Grade (JAG)/ Joint Director/ Deputy Economic Adviser {including Non-Functional Selection Grade (NFSG)/ Director/ Additional Economic Adviser}	148
Senior Time Scale (STS)/ Deputy Director/ Assistant Economic Adviser/ Senior Research Officer	114
Junior Time Scale (JTS)/ Assistant Director/ Research Officer	107
Reserves	40
Total authorised strength	518

=== International equivalency ===
The Indian Economic Service is analogous to services in other countries such as the Government Economic Service (UK), and the Economics and Social Science Services Group (Canada).

== Training ==
Direct recruits undergo comprehensive probationary training comprising various phases ranging from the Foundation Course (along with All India Services and Central Civil Services) to Applied economics at the Institute of Economic Growth (IEG). The training programme also comprises attachments with institutions of repute across the country. The training course also has an international attachment at the Civil Service College, Singapore.

== Notable members ==
- I. G. Patel – 14th governor of Reserve Bank of India
- Manmohan Singh - Economic advisor, Ministry of Foreign Trade, India (1971–1972) (Note: Manmohan Singh was appointed as a lateral entry to the civil services. The post and rank of Economic Advisor is only present in Indian Economic Service cadre.)
- Montek Singh Ahluwalia - Economic adviser in the Ministry of Finance (1979) (Note: Montek Singh Ahluwalia was appointed as a lateral entry to the civil services. The post and rank of Economic Advisor is only present in Indian Economic Service cadre.)
- P. N. Dhar - Economic adviser in Prime Minister's Secretariat (1970) (Note: Professor Dhar was appointed as a lateral entry to the civil services. The post and rank of Economic Advisor is only present in Indian Economic Service cadre.)
- Samar Ranjan Sen – Former executive director of the World Bank for India, Bangladesh and Sri Lanka.
- R. M. Honavar – 6th Chief Economic Adviser to Government of India
- Dr. Sangeeta Verma - Acting Chair & Member, Competition Commission of India, Ex- Principal Adviser (Secretary-rank)
- R.K. Chandolia - Private secretary to Andimuthu Raja and accused in 2G spectrum case
