= Krishnamurthy Subramanian =

Indian economist

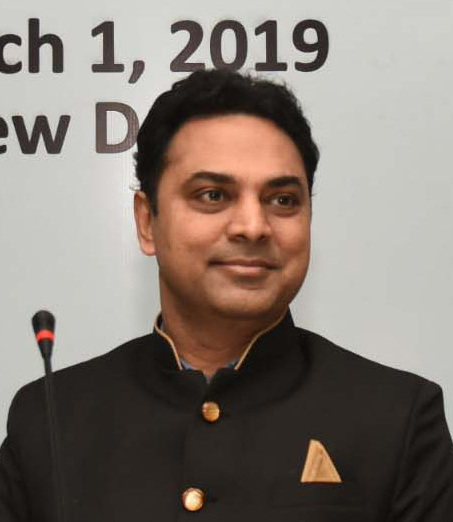

17th Chief Economic Advisor to the Government of India
- In office 7 December 2018 – 6 December 2021
- Prime Minister: Narendra Modi
- Minister: Nirmala Sitharaman
- Preceded by: Arvind Subramanian
- Succeeded by: V. Anantha Nageswaran

Personal details
- Born: 5 May 1971 (age 55) Bhilai, Chhattisgarh, India
- Education: Indian Institute of Technology Kanpur (Bachelor of Technology); Indian Institute of Management Calcutta (Master of Business Administration); University of Chicago Booth School of Business (Doctor of Philosophy)
- Profession: Economist

Academic background
- Doctoral advisor: Luigi Zingales; Raghuram Rajan

Academic work
- Discipline: Financial economics
- Institutions: Indian School of Business; Goizueta Business School, Emory University

Krishnamurthy Venkata Subramanian (born 5 May 1971) is an Indian economist who served as the 17th Chief Economic Advisor to the Government of India. Subramanian is a leading expert on economic policy, banking and corporate governance, who was the youngest Chief Economic Advisor to the Government of India, serving from 2018 to 2021. He has been appointed to the post of India's Executive Director at the IMF, with effect from November 1, 2022 and served their 4 May 2025 .He has been unexpectedly recalled from his post as India’s Executive Director (ED) at the International Monetary Fund (IMF), six months before his three-year term was set to conclude. The recall, approved by the Appointments Committee of the Cabinet (ACC), was announced in an order dated April 30, 2025, and took immediate effect.

== Education ==
Subramanian was born in Bhilai, Chhattisgarh in a Tamil family. He completed his schooling from M.G.M. Senior Secondary School, Sector-6, Bhilai. He is an alumnus of the Indian Institute of Technology Kanpur where he studied electrical engineering and holds a Master of Business Administration from IIM Calcutta, where he was awarded gold medal and placed in the Institute's Roll of Honor . He received a Doctor of Philosophy (PhD) in financial economics from University of Chicago Booth School of Business. His PhD was completed under the supervision of Luigi Zingales and Raghuram Rajan. He was awarded an Ewing Marion Kauffman Foundation Dissertation Fellowship in 2005 for his doctoral research thesis.

== Career ==
Subramanian has worked in expert committees for Securities and Exchange Board of India and the Reserve Bank of India, being a part of major economic and corporate reforms in India. He was Member & Director of Research, P J Nayak Committee on Governance of Bank Boards formed by RBI, and was also a member of Uday Kotak Committee on Corporate Governance in SEBI. He has worked with JPMorgan Chase, ICICI Bank and Tata Consultancy Services.

He was a member of board of directors in Bandhan Bank. He was also a member of board of directors in the National Institute of Bank Management and the Reserve Bank of India Academy.

=== Academic career ===
Subramanian taught at the Goizueta Business School at Emory University in the United States from 2005 to 2010. He is a member of American Finance Association.

In 2009, he visited the Indian School of Business as a visiting scholar. He subsequently joined the ISB as an assistant professor. At ISB, he served as an associate professor and later professor. He also served as the executive director of the Centre for Analytical Finance at ISB. He was awarded "Professor of the Year" by ISB for courses that he taught for the Class of 2019.

=== Chief economic advisor ===
As the Chief Economic Advisor (CEA), Subramanian authored Economic Surveys on Ethical Wealth Creation for a prosperous India (2019–20), the Strategic Blueprint for India to become a US$5 trillion economy (2018–19), and the post-COVID-19 economy using public capital expenditures in infrastructure and healthcare to further counter-cyclical fiscal policy (2020–21). His ideas of the use of Behavioural Economics and Thalinomics captured the public imagination.

Subramanian was inducted into the Fifteenth Finance Commission's advisory council in May 2019.

In articles published in The Times of India and Livemint titled, "Will Black Be Back? Why demonetisation will be revolutionary in India’s fight against corruption", and "Demonetisation: Are the poor really suffering?", respectively, Subramanian supported the Government of India's banknote demonetisation policy in 2016.

In August 2022, Subramanian was appointed the executive director for India at the International Monetary Fund, for a period of three years. He took over from Surjit Bhalla on 1 November 2022. He was removed by the Indian Government on 4 May 2025, six months before his term ended amidst disagreements over IMF datasets and allegations of impropriety related to his book promotion.

Subramanian has been conferred the Distinguished Alumnus award by his alma maters IIT Kanpur and IIM Calcutta.

Government offices
Preceded by Arvind Subramanian	Chief Economic Adviser of India; 2018–2021	Succeeded by V. Anantha Nageswaran
