= A Sixth of Humanity =

2026 book on Indian developmental history

A Sixth of Humanity: Independent India's Development Odyssey is a 2026 book on the developmental history of post independent India. It was written by economist Arvind Subramanian and political scientist Devesh Kapur.

The central theme of the book is that the Indian growth model presents a certain 'precociousness' where democracy outpaced economic development and social change, and where service sector developed before the development of the manufacturing sector and so on. It puts forward a four-fold framework of 'state, society, nation and markets' to analyse India's growth story.

The central problem, as identified by the authors, is statism, where people look at the state as the “provider and protector". “Too much was asked of the state, too often and too soon”, write the authors. However, the work also notes that the state machinery in India is actually surprisingly small; India has almost half the number of police personnel per population as compared to England and Wales; State employment as a percentage of the working-age population in India has been far below the global average. The book contains rich comparative analyses of the many different trajectories traversed by different states in the country, and deals with how development is linked to interstate relations.

The Economist in its review noted that the book that runs into more than 600 pages adopts an approach where 'charts, arguments and catchy phrases' are used in abundance. Tej Parikh, writing in the Financial Times, concluded that the authors provide "one of the most comprehensive analyses" of India's development journey to date.Pulapre Balakrishnan, writing in the Indian Express, criticised the authors stating that the work "is hobbled by the absence of a theoretical vision of growth".
