= Ashok Lahiri =

Indian economist and politician

Dr. Ashok Lahiri
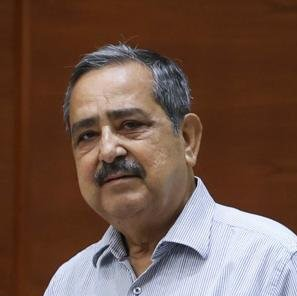

4th Vice Chairman of NITI Aayog
- Incumbent
- Assumed office 8 May 2026
- Prime Minister: Narendra Modi
- Preceded by: Suman Bery

Member of the West Bengal Legislative Assembly
- In office 2 May 2021 – 7 May 2026
- Preceded by: Biswanath Chowdhury
- Succeeded by: Bidyut Kumar Roy
- Constituency: Balurghat

Member of the Fifteenth Finance Commission
- In office 27 November 2017 – 26 November 2023 Serving with Shaktikanta Das (2017–2018), Ramesh Chand & Anoop Singh
- Appointed by: President of India
- Chairman: N. K. Singh

12th Chief Economic Adviser to the Government of India
- In office December 2002 – June 2007
- Appointed by: Appointments Committee of the Cabinet
- Prime Minister: Atal Bihari Vajpayee (2002–2004); Manmohan Singh (2004–2007)
- Preceded by: Rakesh Mohan
- Succeeded by: Arvind Virmani

Director of the National Institute of Public Finance and Policy
- In office February 1998 – October 2002
- Appointed by: Appointments Committee of the Cabinet

Personal details
- Born: Ashok Kumar Lahiri; 3 August 1951 (age 75)
- Party: Bharatiya Janata Party
- Education: Delhi School of Economics; Delhi University (PhD); Presidency University, Kolkata (BA, MA); Hindu School, Kolkata (Higher Secondary Education)
- Occupation: Economist

Ashok Kumar Lahiri is an Indian economist and politician who is currently serving as the Vice Chairman of NITI Aayog. He served as a member of the West Bengal Legislative Assembly from Balurghat constituency from 2021 to 2026. Lahiri previously served as a member of the Fifteenth Finance Commission, as 12th Chief Economic Adviser to the Government of India, reader at the Delhi School of Economics, chairman of Bandhan Bank, executive director at the Asian Development Bank and director of the National Institute of Public Finance and Policy and had stints with the World Bank and the International Monetary Fund, as a consultant and senior economist respectively. He is a member of the Bharatiya Janata Party.

== Education ==
Lahiri is an alumnus of the economics department of the Presidency University, Kolkata. Ashok Lahiri received his early education at Hindu School, Kolkata. He pursued undergraduate studies in economics at Presidency College (now Presidency University), Kolkata, under the University of Calcutta, graduating as an alumnus of its esteemed economics department. Lahiri advanced his academic training at the Delhi School of Economics (DSE), University of Delhi, where he earned a Ph.D. in economics in 1979.This doctoral qualification, obtained from one of India's premier institutions for economic research, laid the foundation for his subsequent roles in economic analysis and policy.

== Economist ==
Lahiri has served as Chief Economic Adviser to the Government of India, chairman of Bandhan Bank, economic adviser in the Ministry of Finance, executive director at the Asian Development Bank, director of the National Institute of Public Finance and Policy, reader at the Delhi School of Economics, consultant with the World Bank, and senior economist at the International Monetary Fund.

=== Director of the National Institute of Public Finance and Policy ===
Lahiri served as the director of the National Institute of Public Finance and Policy for four years between February 1998 and October 2002.

=== Chief Economic Adviser ===
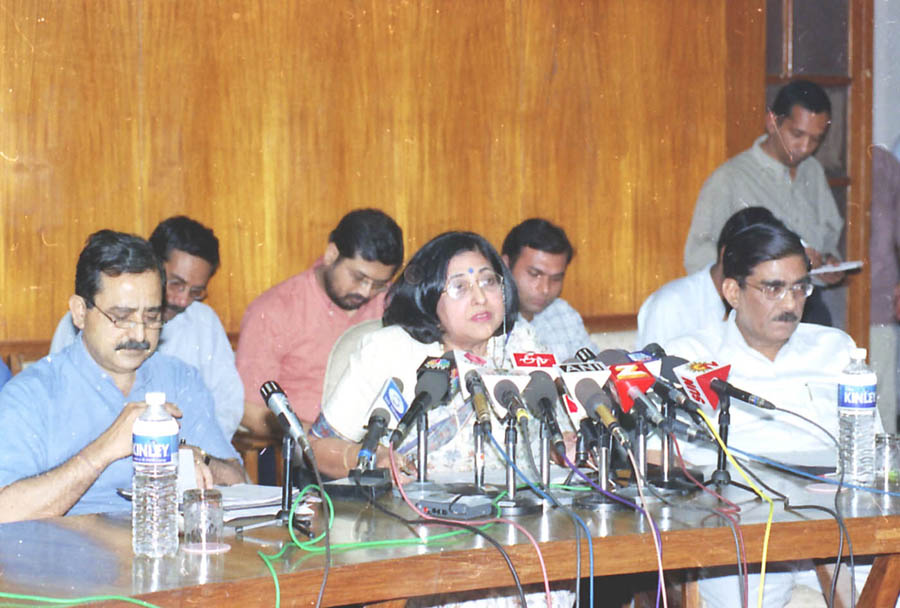
Dr. Ashok Lahiri at a Press Conference as the Chief Economic Advisor along with the Union Finance Secretary D. C. Gupta, the Union Revenue Secretary Binita Roy in New Delhi on 20 April 2004

Lahiri was appointed Chief Economic Adviser to the Government of India (CEA) by the prime minister-led Appointments Committee of the Cabinet in December 2002, and demitted the office of CEA in June 2007, serving in the Ministry of Finance for more than four years. Lahiri served as the CEA under the premiership of Atal Bihari Vajpayee and Manmohan Singh.

=== Chairman of Bandhan Bank ===
Lahiri was appointed the non-executive, part-time chairman of the newly-formed Bandhan Bank in July 2015; Lahiri resigned from his position as chairman in April 2018 to serve as a full-time member of the Fifteenth Finance Commission.

=== Member of the Fifteenth Finance Commission ===
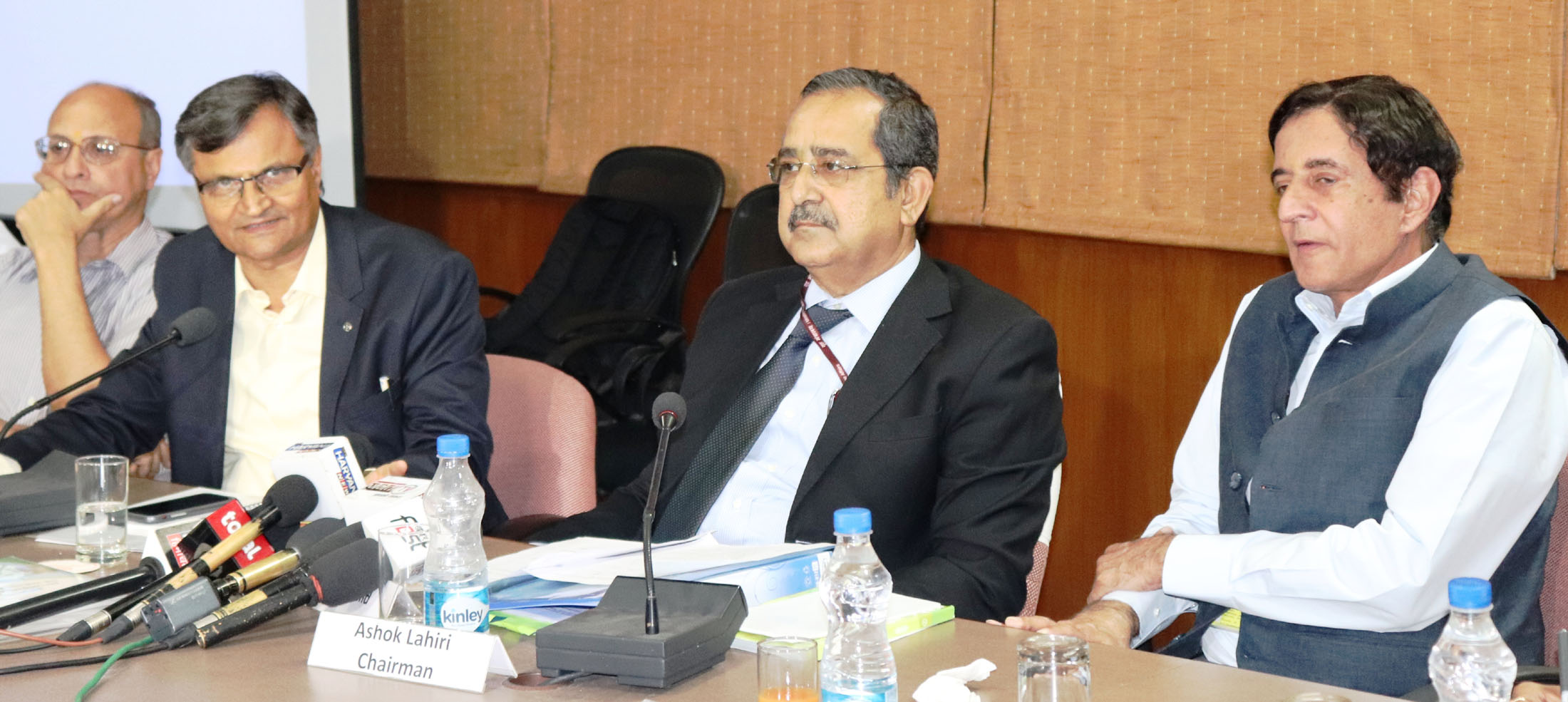
Dr. Ashok Lahiri addressing a Press Conference as the acting Chairman of the 15th Finance Commission regarding the Agriculture Conference, in Chandigarh on May 03, 2018.

Lahiri was appointed a part-time member of the Fifteenth Finance Commission in November 2017 by the President of India, Lahiri was elevated to a full-time member in April 2018 and was accorded the status of a minister of state and served there till 26 November 2023.

== Politics ==
He was declared as a candidate to contest from the Alipurduar constituency in the 2021 West Bengal election but due to animosity among the local BJP members in Alipurduar, his name was later withdrawn from Alipurduar constituency in the list of candidates. He was later declared as a candidate for the Balurghat constituency.

He won against TMC candidate Shekhar Dasgupta by securing 36,143 votes.
