= Shankar Acharya =

Indian economist

Dr. Shankar Acharya

Chief Economic Adviser to the Government of India
- In office 1993–2001
- Preceded by: Deepak Nayyar
- Succeeded by: Rakesh Mohan

Personal details
- Born: October 1945 (age 81)

Dr. Shankar Acharya (born October 1945) is an Indian economist, who was the longest serving Chief Economic Adviser to the Government of India. He is currently an honorary Professor at the Indian Council for Research on International Economic Relations (ICRIER). He served until 2018 as non-executive chairman of Kotak Mahindra Bank. He is chancellor of the Central University of Andhra Pradesh.

== Early life ==
Acharya was educated at Highgate School, London from 1959 to 1963 and in 1967 he graduated from Oxford University where he was a member of Keble College. In 1972 he was awarded a PhD in Economics by Harvard University. His 1972 PhD dissertation is available under: "Acharya, Shankar Nath, Some aspects of imperfections in primary factor markets of less developed countries".

== Career ==
He worked with the World Bank in various capacities from 1971, before returning to India in 1982. He was the leader of the team which produced the 1979 `World Development Report'.

His most significant assignment was as the Chief Economic Adviser to the Government of India (in the rank of Secretary) between 1993 and 2001. He was also on the board of SEBI and EXIM Bank of India during the period. He also served as a Member of the Economic Advisory Council to the Prime Minister (2001–2003) and the Twelfth Finance Commission (2004). His previous assignments with the Government of India include the roles of Senior Adviser (rank of Additional Secretary) and Economic Adviser with the Finance ministry from 1985 to 1990. He stepped down from his role as chairman of Kotak Mahindra Bank in July 2018, after serving as a director since May 2003, and chairman since July 2006.
