= Bidyut Kumar Roy (Indian politician) =

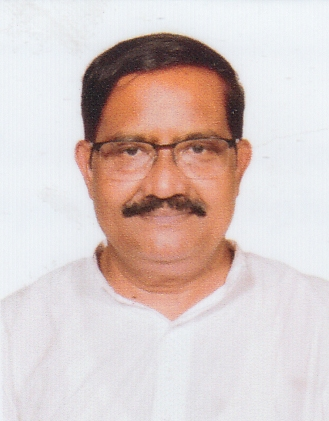
- Roy in 2026

Member of the West Bengal Legislative Assembly
- Incumbent
- Assumed office 2026
- Preceded by: Ashok Kumar Lahiri
- Constituency: Balurghat

Personal details
- Born: 1963 (age 62–63) Balurghat, West Bengal, India
- Party: Bharatiya Janata Party
- Profession: Politician

Bidyut Kumar Roy is an Indian politician and member of the Bharatiya Janata Party. He was elected as a Member of the West Bengal Legislative Assembly from the Balurghat constituency in the 2026 West Bengal Legislative Assembly election.
