= Rajiv Kumar (economist) =

Indian economist

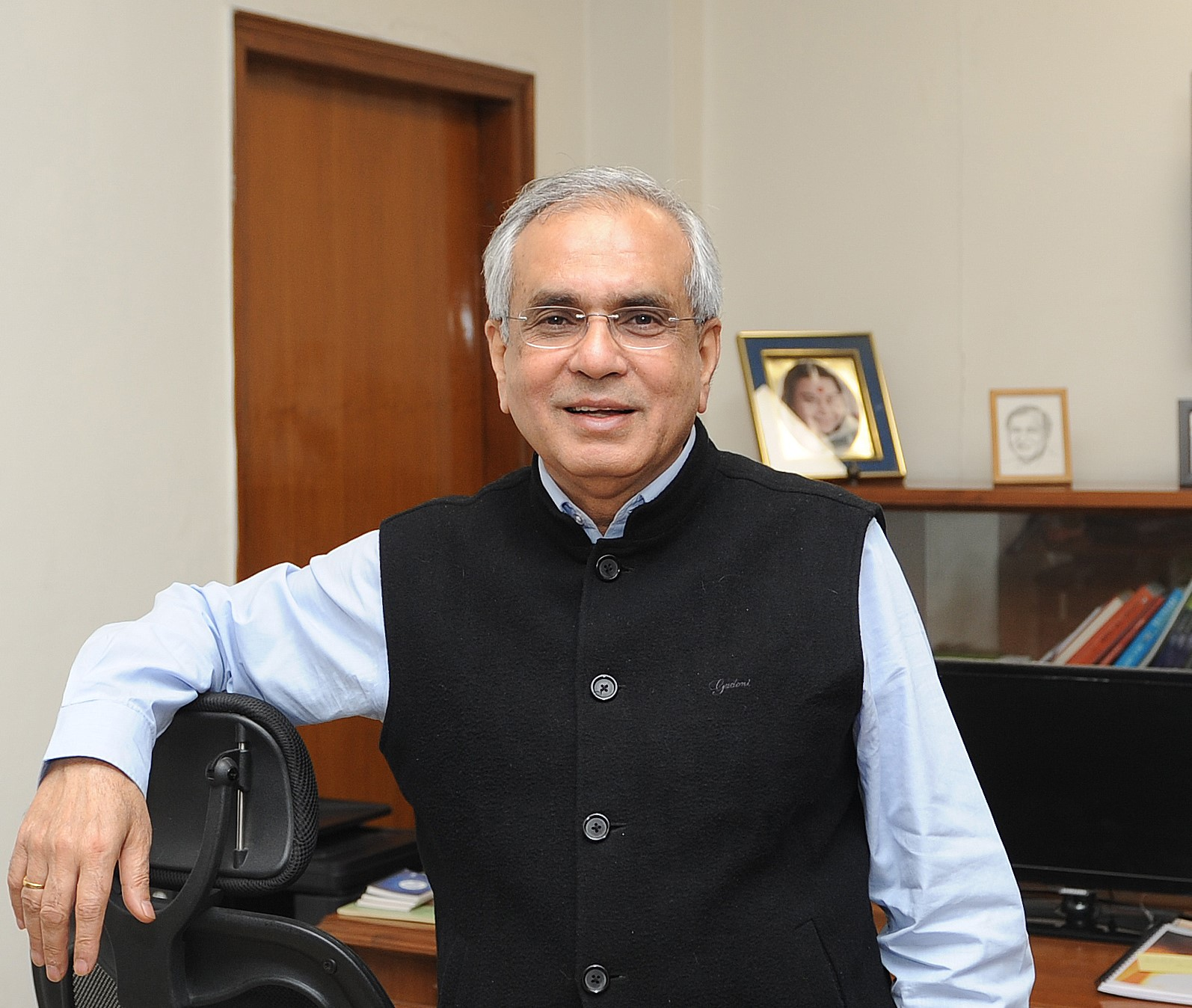

2nd Vice-chairman of NITI Aayog
- In office 1 September 2017 – 30 April 2022
- Preceded by: Arvind Panagariya
- Succeeded by: Suman Bery

Secretary General of Federation of Indian Chambers of Commerce & Industry
- In office 2010 – 2012

Director and Chief Executive of Indian Council for Research on International Economic Relations
- In office 2006 – 2010

Chief Economist of Confederation of Indian Industry
- In office 2004 – 2006

Principal Economist of Asian Development Bank
- In office 1995 – 2005

Senior Consultant of Ministry of Industries and Ministry of Finance, Government of India
- In office 1989 – 1991

Personal details
- Born: 6 July 1951 (age 75)
- Education: Delhi University (BA); University of Lucknow (PhD); University of Oxford (DPhil)
- Profession: Economist

Rajiv Kumar (born 6 July 1951) is an Indian economist who had served as the second vice-chairman of the NITI Aayog. He also served as the chancellor of Gokhale Institute of Politics and Economics, Pune. His earlier stint in government was initially with the Ministry of Industry and subsequently in the Ministry of Finance, as economic advisor during the reform years of 1991-1994. He has wide experience of having worked in government, academia, industry associations, as well as in international financial institutions. He also served as an independent director on the central boards of the Reserve Bank of India and the State Bank of India.

Kumar is the writer of several books on India's economy and national security. He is an economic columnist for major Indian publications and is a speaker on the Indian political economy.

== Early life and education ==
He studied at Modern School, Delhi; St. Stephen’s College, Delhi University; and Canning College, Lucknow University, from where he received his Ph.D in 1978. He later attended New College, Oxford University, earning his D.Phil in Economics in 1982.

== Career ==
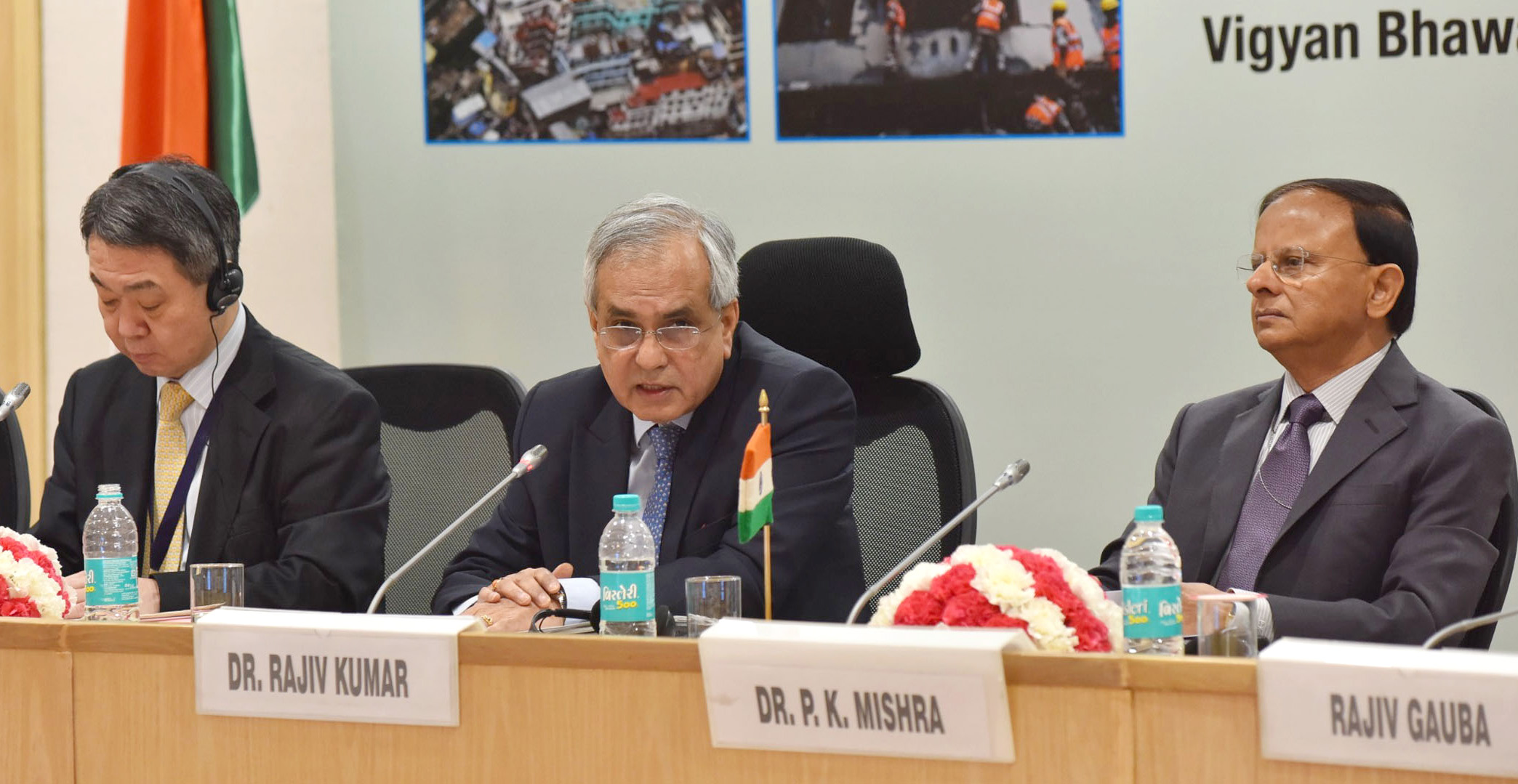
Rajiv Kumar (centre) with Additional Principal Secretary to the Prime Minister, P. K. Misra, IAS (right) and a Japanese vice-minister incharge of policy coordination in Cabinet Office, Mamoru Maekawa (left) at a meet in New Delhi in March 2018.

Kumar was appointed senior research program officer, Indian Council for Research on International Economic Relations (ICRIER) in Delhi in 1982.

He was a professor in Indian Institute of Foreign Trade (IIFT) from 1987 to 1989.

He was then appointed as the Senior Consultant, Bureau of Costs and Prices at the Ministry of Industry, Government of India from 1989 to 1991. He served as the Economic Advisor in the Department of Economic Affairs, Ministry of Finance, Government of India, from 1992 to 1995.

In 1995, he joined the Asian Development Bank in Manila, Philippines as a Principal Economist, where he served until 2005.

He was the Chief Economist for Confederation of India Industries for 2 years from 2004 – 2006.

He returned to ICRIER as the director and Chief Executive in Feb 2006 and continued to be until August 2010.

He was the Secretary General at the FICCI from 2010 to 2012.

He became a senior fellow at the Centre for Policy Research, Delhi from 2013 until January 2017.

In 2017, he was appointed as the vice chairman of NITI Aayog -Government of India's apex think tank, with the rank of a Cabinet Minister. He was also the chairman of the Atal Innovation Mission with its mandate to establish an innovative eco-system in the country. He served in NITI Aayog until 2022.

He also served as an independent director on the Central Boards of the Reserve Bank of India and the State Bank of India.

He is the founding director and Chairman of Pahle India Foundation - a public policy think tank facilitating policy change in India based in New Delhi.

== Honours ==
Kumar was conferred the Order of the Rising Sun, Gold and Silver Star of Japan on 29 April 2023 as a part of the 2023 Spring Conferment of Decorations. He was conferred the order in recognition of his contributions to strengthening the economic relations between Japan and India.

== Bibliography ==
- Kumar, Rajiv (2016). Modi and His Challenges. New Delhi. ISBN 978-9384898342. OCLC 951840612.
- Agarwala, Ramgopal; Kumar, Rajiv; Shah, Rajesh (2015). Resurgent India: Ideas and Priorities. New Delhi. ISBN 9789332701632. OCLC 914465376.
- Kumar, Rajiv (2014). Exploding Aspirations: Unlocking India's Future. New Delhi. ISBN 9789332701540. OCLC 889174707.
