= Suman Bery =

Indian economist

3rd Vice Chairman of NITI Aayog
- In office 1 May 2022 – 30 April 2026
- Preceded by: Rajiv Kumar
- Succeeded by: Ashok Lahiri

Personal details
- Education: The Doon School; Oakham School; University of Oxford; Princeton University
- Profession: Economist

Suman Bery is an Indian economist, academic, and writer who was the Vice Chairman of NITI Aayog. After serving at the World Bank for 28 years, Bery served as the Chief Economist of Oil and Gas supermajor Royal Dutch Shell, based in The Hague, Netherlands. He is a Global Fellow in the Woodrow Wilson International Center for Scholars in Washington DC and a Non-resident Fellow of Brussels based think tank Bruegel. He was the former director general of National Council of Applied Economic Research and the former Indian country director of International Growth Centre.

== Education ==
Bery was educated at The Doon School in Dehradun, and then spent a year at Oakham School, UK. He then went to Magdalen College, University of Oxford, where he read philosophy, politics and economics, and later received a master's degree in public affairs from the Woodrow Wilson School of Public and International Affairs, Princeton University.

== Career ==
Suman worked at the World Bank for 28 years, and later became the lead economist. His career at the bank spanned research on financial sector development and country policy and strategy, notably in Latin America and the Caribbean. His country experience included Brazil, Argentina, Chile and Peru. Areas of focus included the macro-economy, financial markets, and public debt management.

From 1992 to 1994, on leave from the World Bank, Mr. Bery worked as Special Consultant to the Reserve Bank of India, Bombay, where he advised the Governor on financial sector policy, institutional reform, and market development and regulation.

In 2001, he left the World Bank to become the director general of National Council of Applied Economic Research(NCAER). He was the director general and chief executive of NCAER from 2001 till 2011. He is also a senior visiting fellow at Centre for Policy Research.

Bery was Royal Dutch Shell's Chief Economist between 2012 and 2016. While at Shell he led a collaborative project with Indian think tanks to apply scenario modelling to India's energy sector.

In previous roles, Suman has served as a member of the Prime Minister's Economic Advisory Council, of India's Statistical Commission and of the Reserve Bank of India's Technical Advisory Committee on Monetary Policy.

He is a Global Fellow in the Asia program of the Woodrow Wilson International Center for Scholars in Washington DC, a Nonresident Fellow of the Brussels think-tank Bruegel, as well as a Senior Fellow of the Mastercard Center for Inclusive Growth.

He also serves on the board of the Shakti Sustainable Energy Foundation in New Delhi, a non-profit dedicated to supporting India's transition to a low-carbon future.

He regularly contributes columns to newspapers, journals, and magazines, including Forbes, Business Standard, Indian Express, and Economic and Political Weekly.

== Bibliography ==
- Shakil Faruqi, Suman K Bery, Financial sector reforms, economic growth, and stability: experiences in selected Asian and Latin American countries, World Bank, 1994, ISBN 978-0-8213-3013-5
- Bery, Suman (co-author), India Policy Forum 2008–2009, SAGE Publishing, July 2009, ISBN 978-8132101499
- Bery, Suman (co-author), India Policy Forum 2010–2011, SAGE Publishing, July 2011, ISBN 978-8132107477
- Bery, Suman (co-author), Energizing India: Towards a Resilient and Equitable Energy System, SAGE Publishing, December 2016, ISBN 978-9385985232
