= National Institute of Bank Management =

Central government research unit in India

National Institute of Bank Management (NIBM) Pune, India
- Type: Autonomous institution
- Established: 1969
- Parent institution: Reserve Bank of India
- Chairman: Governor, Reserve Bank of India
- Director: Partha Ray
- Location: Pune, Maharashtra, India
- Website: www.nibmindia.org

The National Institute of Bank Management (NIBM) is an autonomous institute located in Pune, India. It is an autonomous, apex institution for research, training, education and consultancy in bank management.

== About ==
NIBM was established on September 24, 1969, by the Reserve Bank of India (RBI), in consultation with the Government of India (GoI), as an autonomous apex institution for research, training, education and consultancy in Bank Management. Its mandate is to play a proactive role of "think-tank" of the banking system. NIBM is part of the grand vision of giving a new direction to the banking industry in India and making the same a more cost-effective instrument for national development.

NIBM is governed by a Board, its highest policy-making body and, the governor of the Reserve Bank of India (RBI) is the chairman of the Governing Board. The Governing Board includes representatives from the various member banks and educational institutes. Prof. Partha Ray is the current director of the institute.

== Activities ==
=== Research ===
Research studies initiated by faculty members form the foundation of various academic activities at NIBM. The Institute Library has a rich collection of more than 70000 books and 130 journals, on various branches of management. NIBM is also equipped with state-of-the-art statistical packages and databases, to facilitate advanced research on banking and finance. Most of the research work seeks to address the existing and emerging challenges in the banking and financial sector in India and abroad. The institute also conducts Action Research Projects and projects sponsored by various institutions and government agencies including Reserve Bank of India; Ministry of Rural Development, Government of India, National Bank for Agriculture and Rural Development; International Finance Corporation, and Asian Development Bank. Some of these studies assist in policy formulation and evaluation for individual banks and FIs, as well as the entire banking system. Faculty members publish their research in reputed national and international journals. They also conduct regular academic and practitioner-oriented conferences, on banking and finance.

NIBM faculty members have published The India Banking and Finance Report 2021. This is an initiative to disseminate their opinions on contemporary subjects such as macro-financial issues, corporate governance challenges, mergers and acquisitions, problems and prospects of the Bad Bank, latest risk management concepts and frontiers, digital transformation and leadership paradigms, etc.

=== Training ===
NIBM plays a very important role in capacity building of bank executives by offering training programmes in contemporary areas of banking and finance. Over more than 50 years, NIBM has conducted executive training programmes attended by more than 100,000 bankers from India and various other countries. Every year NIBM conducts about 150 training programmes attended by about 5000 participants from various banks and financial institutions. The programmes are tailored to the emerging needs of banking focusing on areas like credit, risk management, treasury, audit, compliance, international banking, information technology, marketing, leadership, etc. The trainings are offered in various formats (at NIBM campus/online/at the bank's location). NIBM also offers customized Executive Development Programmes, Functional Programmes (for a particular banking domain), Conferences and Workshops, Faculty Development Programmes for Staff Training College faculty members. NIBM training programmes are interactive in nature and various self-paced assignments and cases studies, etc. enrich the learning of the participants.

=== Education ===
The Institute had one of its major breakthroughs when it introduced Post Graduate Programme in Banking and Finance (PGPBF) in 2003–2004. Dr Bimal Jalan, the then governor, RBI formally launched the PGPBF. This course enables the students to possess sound analytical foundation, innovative outlook and practical orientation to the nuances of banking and finance. Keeping in mind the expectations of the banking system, in 2009–2010, the Governing Board of the Institute changed the duration of the course from 1 year to 2 years. In 2013, the All India Council of Technical Education (AICTE), Government of India, granted approval to the Post Graduate Programme, which was then renamed as Post Graduate Diploma in Management (PGDM) – Banking and Financial Services. NIBM- PGDM is well received by the banking industry and since inception, it has maintained cent per cent students placement in Commercial Banks, Financial Institutions, Rating Agencies, Consulting Firms and related industries.

=== Consultancy ===
Providing consultancy support to banks and financial institutions has always been one of the key strengths of the institute. The focus of our consultancy activities has evolved over time: during the 1970s and 1980s, the focus was more on providing support in organizational design and development, design and implementation of management information systems, manpower planning, etc. With the introduction of the financial sector reforms at the initiative of the RBI and the Government of India in the early 90s, there were increasing demands from commercial banks to assist them in strategic business repositioning, organizational restructuring, human resource development, profitability and productivity strategies, etc. Towards the end of the 1990s, the NIBM took the lead in assisting the banks and financial institutions in setting up their integrated risk management system, asset liability management system, managing market risk, credit risk management system design, etc. Credit Rating for Large Corporate and SMEs developed by NIBM faculty are popular in banks. The institute has also successfully handled the HR issues in the recent merger of various banks. Presently the focus of the consulting activities is more on IRM, designing ICAAP, organizational restructuring, manpower planning, customer relationship management, customer service, etc.

=== On-line certification courses ===
In 2016–2017, Indian Banks Association (IBA) shortlisted NIBM as one of the training institutions for delivering on-line certification courses to improve skills and competencies of first and second line bank officials. NIBM, thus launched On-line Certification Courses in five areas, viz., Credit Management, Risk Management, Treasury Management, Accounts & Audit and Banking Operations Management. The on-line learning platform provides participants course material, quizzes, assignments, etc. The classroom learning experience is also provided through video-based sessions. There has been an overwhelming response from officers from banks and financial institutions to the online courses.

== Publications ==
The institute, since its inception in 1969, has been bringing out a variety of publications in the form of books, journals, reports, mimeographs and working papers in tandem with its research and training functions. Apart from over 100 books, a major segment of the publications consisted of the 14 Programmed Learning Texts on operational banking published in the initial years of the NIBM, specifically to meet the training needs of the new entrants into the banking industry due to its geographic expansion in the 1970s.
A major activity is the regular publication of the following two quarterly journals in English:

- Prajnan: Journal of Social and Management Sciences: A Leading Refereed Quarterly Journal (launched in 1972).
- Vinimaya: Presents conceptual and practical viewpoints of both bankers and management educationists (launched in 1979).

== Member banks ==
The Reserve Bank of India, the State Bank of India, 11 Nationalised Banks and HSBC are the member banks of NIBM. While 18 banks in various categories are associate members of the institute.
