= Palamadai S. Lokanathan =

First Executive Secretary of the United Nations Economic Commission for Asia and the Far East (ECAFE)

Director General of the National Council of Applied Economic Research

Personal details
- Born: circa 1894 Palamadai, Tirunelveli District, Tamil Nadu, India
- Died: 5 May 1972
- Education: Madras University

Palamadai S Lokanathan (c. 1894 – 5 May 1972) was the First Executive Secretary of the United Nations Economic Commission for Asia and the Far East (ECAFE), which later became the United Nations Economic and Social Commission for Asia and the Pacific (UNESCAP). He also served as the first Director General of the National Council of Applied Economic Research in New Delhi.

== Biography ==
An economist who had made a distinguished career in teaching, government service, and private enterprise, Lokanathan was also a member of the Senate of Madras and a member of the Academic Council of Madras University, where he was Professor of Economics. He was also a member of the Board of Studies in Economics for the Universities of Madras, Travancore, Annamalai (Annamalai University) and Andhra, and Chairman of the Commerce College, Delhi University, Delhi.

While he was still at Madras University, he became a member of the consultative Committee of Economists to the Indian Government; he was also appointed a member of the Labour Advisory Board of the Madras Government, and he was a president of the Economic Association of India. To a large section of the Indian public Lokanathan became known as editor of the Eastern Economist which he joined after he worked as editor of the Hindustan Times, also in New Delhi.

Lokanathan is originally from the village Palamadai, in Tirunelveli District, Tamil Nadu State, in South India.
