= Rakesh Mohan =

Indian economist (born 1948)

Deputy Governor of Reserve Bank of India
- In office 2 July 2005 - 10 June 2009
- Governor: Y. V. Reddy; Duvvuri Subbarao
- In office 9 September 2002 - 31 October 2004
- Governor: Bimal Jalan; Y.V. Reddy

Chief Economic Adviser to the Government of India
- In office 31 October 2004 - 1 July 2005
- Preceded by: Shankar Acharya
- Succeeded by: Ashok K Lahiri

Personal details
- Born: 1948 (age 77–78)
- Education: Imperial College London (B.Sc); Yale University (B.A.); Princeton University (Ph.D.)
- Profession: Economist

Rakesh Mohan (born 1948) is an Indian economist and former Deputy Governor of Reserve Bank of India. He is currently a part time member of Prime Minister's Economic Advisory Council (EAC).

He remained an adviser to numerous ministries in Government of India, including industry, and finance, and later became an important part of Indian economic reforms in the 1990s, and his report under the Rakesh Mohan Committee on Infrastructure, became a "landmark document in the evolution of thinking on economic policy issues". He is the professor in the Practice of International Economics of Finance, Yale School of Management, and Senior Fellow, Jackson Institute for Global Affairs at Yale University. He was India's Executive Director at the International Monetary Fund, Washington DC, USA. He was the President of the Centre for Social and Economic Progress (CSEP), a public policy think tank based in New Delhi. He is currently the President Emeritus at CSEP.

== Early life ==
Mohan attended Mayo College, a boarding school in Rajasthan. He received a B.Sc. in electrical engineering from Imperial College London in 1969 and a B.A. in economics from Yale University in 1971. He received his Ph.D. in economics from Princeton University in 1977 after completing a doctoral dissertation titled "Development, structural change and urbanization: explorations with a dynamic three sector general equilibrium model applied to India, 1951–1984."

== Career ==
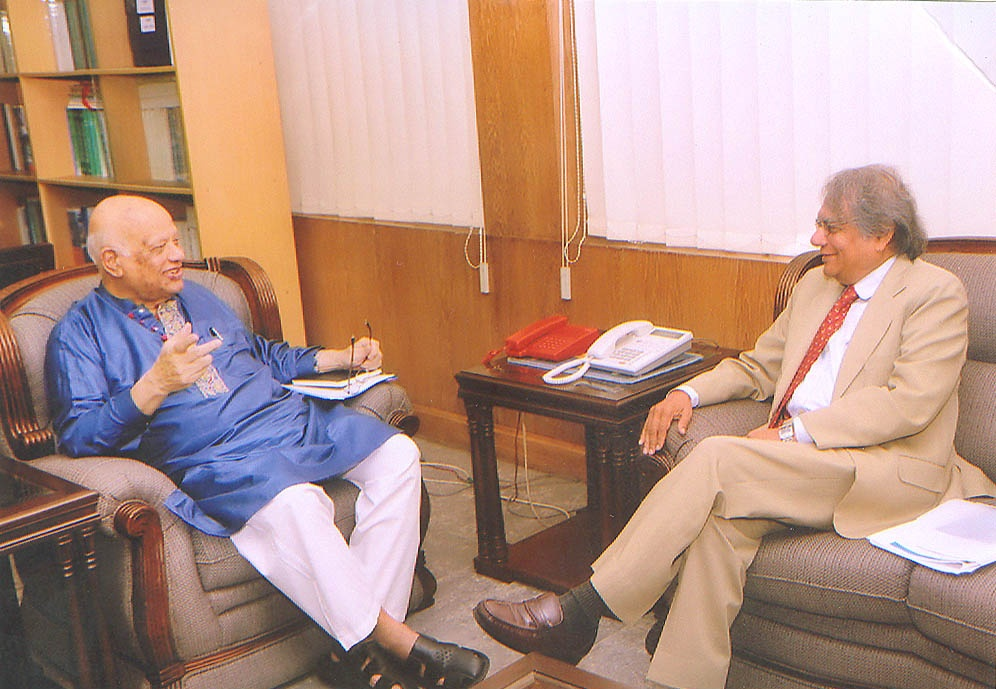
Rakesh Mohan with Abul Maal Abdul Muhith in Bangladesh

Mohan started his career in urban economics, 1974 to 1988. During this period, as a part of the World Bank's City Study project, he studied the city of Bogotá, Colombia, from 1976–1980. He returned to India in 1980, where he first joined the Planning Commission as a senior consultant, while Manmohan Singh was also a member.

In 1985, according to the American Economic Association he was listed as "Economist" in the Philippines Division of the World Bank with research interests listed as "Economic policy and analysis of the Philippines".

He became the Deputy Governor, Reserve Bank of India (RBI) in September 2002 and moved to North Block in October 2004 as Secretary, Department of Economic Affairs and Chief Economic Adviser to the Finance Minister of India till July 2005, before returning to RBI, where he remained till June 2009, when he took up an assignment at Stanford Centre for International Development at Stanford University, US, and subsequently joined McKinsey and Co's economic research wing. In 2010 back in India from his project, he worked with Nandan Nilekani, Shirish Patel, Keshub Mahindra, Deepak Parekh, to set up Indian Institute for Human Settlements, in Delhi.

In April 2010, he joined the board of directors of Nestle India.

In November 2012, he joined IMF as Executive Director. He is also on the advisory board of OMFIF.

== Bibliography ==
- Urban economic and planning models: assessing the potential for cities in developing countries. Johns Hopkins University Press (for the World Bank), 1979. ISBN 0-8018-2141-X.
- Work, wages, and welfare in a developing, metropolis: consequences of growth in Bogotá, Colombia. A World Bank Publication. Oxford University Press US, 1986. ISBN 0-19-520540-5.
- Understanding the developing metropolis: lessons from the city study of Bogotá and Cali, Colombia. A World Bank Publication. Oxford University Press US, 1994. ISBN 019520882X.
- Policy reform in India, with Omkar Goswami, Isher Judge Ahluwalia, Ed Charles Oman. OECD Publishing, 1996. ISBN 92-64-15308-X.
- India's Economy — Performance and Challenges. with Shankar Acharya (ed); Oxford University Press. 2010, ISBN 0-19-806469-1.
