= Biswanath Chowdhury =

Indian politician (2010–)

Minister for Jails and Social Welfare in the West Bengal Government
- In office 1986–2011

Member of Legislative Assembly of West Bengal
- In office 2016–2021
- Preceded by: Sankar Chakraborty
- Succeeded by: Ashok Kumar Lahiri
- Constituency: Balurghat
- In office 1977–2011
- Preceded by: Bireshwar Roy
- Succeeded by: Sankar Chakraborty
- Constituency: Balurghat

Personal details
- Born: 1 August 1942
- Died: 27 July 2024 (aged 81) Kolkata, West Bengal, India
- Party: Revolutionary Socialist Party

Biswanath Chowdhury (1 August 1942 – 27 July 2024) was an Indian Revolutionary Socialist Party politician, and a Member of the Legislative Assembly (MLA) from Balurghat eight times. He was the West Bengal minister for Jails and Social Welfare for quarter of a century.

== Seven-time MLA ==
Biswanath Chowdhury, a graduate from Balurghat College, first became a MLA in 1977. Thereafter, he continued as MLA in 1982, 1987, 1991, 1996, 2001 and 2006. In the 2011 elections he lost to Sankar Chakraborty of All India Trinamool Congress.

== Ministerial role ==
Chowdhury was minister for Jails and Social Welfare in West Bengal for 25 years from 1986 to 2011.

== Death ==
Chowdhury died from cancer in Kolkata, on 27 July 2024, at the age of 82.

Political offices
Preceded by ?	Minister for Jails and Social Welfare in the West Bengal Government; 1986–2011	Succeeded by ?
State Legislative Assembly
Preceded by Bireshwar Roy	Member of the West Bengal Legislative Assembly from Balurghat Assembly constituency 2016– 2011	Succeeded by Sankar Chakraborty
Preceded by Sankar Chakraborty	Member of the West Bengal Legislative Assembly from Balurghat Assembly constituency 2016–2021	Succeeded by ?
