= Balurghat Assembly constituency =

West Bengal Legislative Assembly constituency

Balurghat
- Constituency No. 39 for the West Bengal Legislative Assembly
- Interactive Map Outlining Balurghat Assembly Constituency

Constituency details
- Country: India
- Region: East India
- State: West Bengal
- District: Dakshin Dinajpur
- Lok Sabha constituency: Balurghat
- Established: 1951
- Total electors: 180,390
- Reservation: None

Member of Legislative Assembly
- 18th West Bengal Legislative Assembly
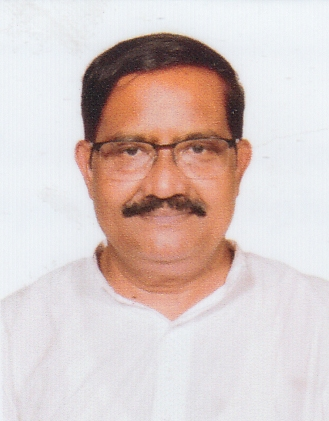
- Incumbent Bidyut Kumar Roy
- Party: BJP
- Alliance: NDA
- Elected year: 2026

Balurghat Assembly constituency is an assembly constituency in Dakshin Dinajpur district in the Indian state of West Bengal.

== Overview ==
As per orders of the Delimitation Commission, No. 39 Balurghat Assembly constituency covers Balurghat municipality, Amritakhand, Vatpara and Chingishpur gram panchayats of Balurghat community development block and Hilli community development block.

Balurghat Assembly constituency is part of No. 6 Balurghat Lok Sabha constituency.

== Members of the Legislative Assembly ==
Election	Member	Party
1951	Saroj Ranjan Chattopadhyay	Indian National Congress
1951	Lakhsman Chandra Handa	Indian National Congress
1957	Mardi Hakai	Indian National Congress
1957	Dhiren Banerjee	Revolutionary Socialist Party
1962	Sushil Ranjan Chattopadhyay	Indian National Congress
1967	Mukul Basu	Independent
1969	Mukul Basu	Revolutionary Socialist Party
1971	Bireshwar Roy	Indian National Congress
1972	Bireshwar Roy	Indian National Congress
1977	Biswanath Chowdhury	Revolutionary Socialist Party
1982	Biswanath Chowdhury	Revolutionary Socialist Party
1987	Biswanath Chowdhury	Revolutionary Socialist Party
1991	Biswanath Chowdhury	Revolutionary Socialist Party
1996	Biswanath Chowdhury	Revolutionary Socialist Party
2001	Biswanath Chowdhury	Revolutionary Socialist Party
2006	Biswanath Chowdhury	Revolutionary Socialist Party
2011	Sankar Chakraborty	Trinamool Congress
2016	Biswanath Chowdhury	Revolutionary Socialist Party
2021	Ashok Kumar Lahiri	Bharatiya Janata Party
2026	Bidyut Kumar Roy	Bharatiya Janata Party

== Election results ==
Vote share of Winning candidates
2026	60.45%
2021	47.42%
2016	42.82%
2011	54.27%
2006	45.65%
2001	47.40%
1996	47.93%
1991	44.60%
1987	55.41%
1982	54.58%
1977	53.21%
1972	54.09%
1971	46.09%
1969	56.74%
1967	50.63%
1962	49.51%
1957	23.22%
1957	21.23%
1951	31.23%
1951	28.01%

=== 2026 ===
2026 West Bengal Legislative Assembly election: Balurghat
Party	Candidate	Votes	%	±%
BJP	Bidyut Kumar Roy	95,697	60.45	▲13.03
AITC	Arpita Ghosh	48,121	30.4	▼8.19
RSP	Arnab Chowdhury	8,593	5.43	▼5.19
INC	Pradip Kumar Mitra	1,648	1.04	
NOTA	None of the above	1,444	0.91	▼0.29
Majority		47,576	30.05	▲21.22
Turnout		158,296	94.61	▲10.3
BJP hold		Swing		

=== 2021 ===
In the 2021 election, Ashok Kumar Lahiri of BJP defeated his nearest rival Sekhar Dasgupta of Trinamool Congress.

West Bengal assembly elections, 2021: Balurghat constituency
Party	Candidate	Votes	%	±%
BJP	Ashok Lahiri	72,129	47.42	▲36.64
AITC	Sekhar Dasgupta	58,693	38.59	▼3.20
RSP	Sucheta Biswas	16,153	10.62	▼32.20
NOTA	None of the above	1,830	1.20	
Majority		13,436	8.83	
Turnout		152,092	84.31	
BJP gain from RSP		Swing		

=== 2016 ===
In the 2016 election, Biswanath Chowdhury of RSP defeated his nearest rival Shankar Chakraborty of Trinamool Congress.

West Bengal assembly elections, 2016: Balurghat constituency
Party	Candidate	Votes	%	±%
RSP	Biswanath Chowdhury	60,590	42.82	+3.26
AITC	Sankar Chakraborty	59,140	41.79	−12.48
BJP	Gautam Chakraborty	15,258	10.78	+7.26
NOTA	None of the above	3,357	2.37	+2.37
BSP	Samar Kumar Mahato	1,668	1.18	
SUCI(C)	Biren Mahanta	1,490	1.05	
Turnout		141,503	88.10	−1.04
RSP gain from AITC		Swing	#	

=== 2011 ===
2011 West Bengal Legislative Assembly election: Balurghat
Party	Candidate	Votes	%	±%
AITC	Chakraborty Shankar	67,495	54.27	New entry
RSP	Biswanath Choudhury	49,204	39.56	▼6.09
BJP	Ranjan Kumar Mondal	4,378	3.52	▼35.78
Independent	Keshab Ray	1,862	1.50	Steady
BSP	Nripendra Nath Hansda	1,427	1.15	▼0.19
Majority		18,291	14.71	▲8.36
Turnout		124,366	88.95	
AITC gain from RSP		Swing		

=== 2006 ===
2006 West Bengal Legislative Assembly election: Balurghat
Party	Candidate	Votes	%	±%
RSP	Biswanath Choudhury	56,512	45.65	▼1.75
BJP	Debasree Chaudhuri	48,644	39.30	▲33.79
INC	Tapan Kanti Deb	13,050	10.54	New entry
Independent	Sagar Modak	3,002	2.43	Steady
BSP	Nripendra Nath Hasda	1,663	1.34	New entry
Majority		7,868	6.35	▲3.96
Turnout		123,782		
RSP hold		Swing		

=== 2001 ===
2001 West Bengal Legislative Assembly election: Balurghat
Party	Candidate	Votes	%	±%
RSP	Choudhury Biswanath	53,945	47.40	▼0.53
AITC	Shankar Chakravorti	51,222	45.01	New entry
BJP	Dilip Dey	6,273	5.51	▼4.88
Independent	Bhagirath Barman	2,363	2.08	Steady
Majority		2,723	2.39	▼5.09
Turnout		113,960	80.73	▼5.82
RSP hold		Swing		

=== 1996 ===
1996 West Bengal Legislative Assembly election: Balurghat
Party	Candidate	Votes	%	±%
RSP	Choudhury Biswanath	55,183	47.93	▲3.33
INC	Khan Biplab	46,562	40.45	▲3.23
BJP	Mahabir Prosad Saraogi	11,964	10.39	▼6.65
Independent	Sachin Mardi	530	0.46	Steady
Independent	Narayan Chandra Barman	289	0.25	Steady
Independent	Probodh Kumar Barman	261	0.23	Steady
Independent	Dhirendra Nath Singh	238	0.21	Steady
Independent	Ashwini Kumar Majumder	94	0.08	Steady
Majority		8,621	7.48	▲0.10
Turnout		115,567	86.55	▲3.40
RSP hold		Swing		

=== 1991 ===
1991 West Bengal Legislative Assembly election: Balurghat
Party	Candidate	Votes	%	±%
RSP	Biswanath Chowdhury	46,597	44.60	▼10.81
INC	Khan Biplab	38,884	37.22	▼6.20
BJP	Mahabir Prosad Saraogi	17,806	17.04	New entry
Independent	Probadh Talpatra	510	0.49	Steady
Independent	Narayan Chandra Barman	370	0.35	Steady
AMB	Jaharlal Mahata	310	0.30	New entry
Majority		7,713	7.38	▼4.61
Turnout		106,273	83.15	▲1.40
RSP hold		Swing		

=== 1987 ===
1987 West Bengal Legislative Assembly election: Balurghat
Party	Candidate	Votes	%	±%
RSP	Biswanath Choudhury	48,066	55.41	▲0.83
INC	Madhab Chandra Roy	37,664	43.42	New entry
Independent	Nitya Nanda Baraman	671	0.77	Steady
Independent	Joharlal Mahoto	345	0.40	Steady
Majority		10,402	11.99	▲0.24
Turnout		87,775	81.75	▼1.20
RSP hold		Swing		

=== 1982 ===
1982 West Bengal Legislative Assembly election: Balurghat
Party	Candidate	Votes	%	±%
RSP	Biswanath Choudhury	41,197	54.58	▲1.37
IC(S)	Ashish Roy	32,324	42.83	New entry
Independent	Jawharlal Mahata	1,954	2.59	Steady
Majority		8,873	11.75	▼17.48
Turnout		76,605	82.95	▲10.78
RSP hold		Swing		

=== 1977 ===
1977 West Bengal Legislative Assembly election: Balurghat
Party	Candidate	Votes	%	±%
RSP	Biswanath Choudhauri	29,292	53.21	▲9.17
INC	Jyotiswar Sarkar	13,203	23.98	▼30.11
JP	Biswa Ranjan Sengupta	12,307	22.36	New entry
Independent	Naresh Chandra Mahato	248	0.45	Steady
Majority		16,089	29.23	▲19.18
Turnout		55,736	72.17	▲2.27
RSP gain from INC		Swing		

=== 1972 ===
1972 West Bengal Legislative Assembly election: Balurghat
Party	Candidate	Votes	%	±%
INC	Bireswar Roy	28,894	54.09	▲8.00
RSP	Mukul Basu	23,526	44.04	▲1.93
Jharkhand Party	Nakul Singh	395	0.74	New entry
PBI	Birem Mahato	370	0.69	New entry
Independent	Asutosh Ghose	238	0.45	Steady
Majority		5,368	10.05	▲6.07
Turnout		54,622	69.90	▼5.59
INC hold		Swing		

=== 1971 ===
1971 West Bengal Legislative Assembly election: Balurghat
Party	Candidate	Votes	%	±%
INC	Bireswar Roy	25,109	46.09	▲9.88
RSP	Jatin Chakraborty	22,941	42.11	▼14.63
CPI	Chattopadhay Jyotirmoy	3,960	7.27	New entry
Bangla Congress	Chanduri Dilip Kumar	1,427	2.62	New entry
Independent	Chunilal Nedgi	933	1.71	Steady
Independent	Arun Banerjee	113	0.21	Steady
Majority		2,168	3.98	▼16.55
Turnout		57,839	75.49	▲0.89
INC gain from RSP		Swing		

=== 1969 ===
1969 West Bengal Legislative Assembly election: Balurghat
Party	Candidate	Votes	%	±%
RSP	Mukul Basu	27,389	56.74	New entry
INC	Ranajit Basu	17,478	36.21	▼5.27
ABJS	Das Laha Bholanath	2,256	4.67	New entry
PSP	Das Sailendra	691	1.43	New entry
NDF	Birendra Lal Dey Sircar	320	0.66	New entry
PBI	Taraphdar Susanta	138	0.29	New entry
Majority		9,911	20.53	▲11.38
Turnout		49,413	74.60	▼1.34
RSP gain from Independent		Swing		

=== 1967 ===
1967 West Bengal Legislative Assembly election: Balurghat
Party	Candidate	Votes	%	±%
Independent	M. Basu	23,583	50.63	Steady
INC	G. L. Ghose	19,322	41.48	▼8.03
Independent	S. C. Sarkar	2,743	5.89	Steady
Independent	D. N. Mohanto	676	1.45	Steady
Independent	K. P. Das	255	0.55	Steady
Majority		4,261	9.15	▲3.37
Turnout		48,985	75.94	▲19.66
Independent gain from INC		Swing		

=== 1962 ===
1962 West Bengal Legislative Assembly election: Balurghat
Party	Candidate	Votes	%	±%
INC	Susil Ranjan Chattopadhyay	17,277	49.51	Steady
RSP	Dhirendra Nath Banerjee	15,262	43.73	Steady
PSP	Anil Kumar Biswas	2,358	6.76	Steady
Majority		2,015	5.78	▲3.79
Turnout		36,598	56.28	▼41.78

=== 1957 ===
1957 West Bengal Legislative Assembly election: Balurghat (ST)
Party	Candidate	Votes	%	±%
Independent	Dhirendra Nath Banerjee	24,387	23.22	Steady
INC	Mardi Hakai	22,296	21.23	Steady
INC	Saroj Ranjan Chatterjee	21,314	20.29	Steady
Independent	Nathaniel Murmu	20,434	19.45	Steady
Independent	Pravash Chandra Laha	5,070	4.83	Steady
Independent	Abinash Chandra Basu	3,977	3.79	Steady
Independent	Sancha Nath Sarkar	3,108	2.96	Steady
Independent	Pramatha Nath Neogi	2,734	2.60	Steady
Independent	Baji Nath Baske	1,721	1.64	Steady
Majority		2,091	1.99	▼1.23
Turnout		105,041	98.06	▲14.42

=== 1951 ===
1951 West Bengal Legislative Assembly election: Balurghat
Party	Candidate	Votes	%	±%
INC	Saroj Ranjan Chattopadhyaya	26,075	31.23	New entry
INC	Lakshman Chandra Hasda	23,386	28.01	New entry
RSP	Dhirendra Nath Bandopadhyay	10,842	12.99	New entry
RSP	Cornelius Murmu	9,697	11.62	New entry
Independent	Ramesh Chandra Dutta	6,055	7.25	Steady
FBL(RG)	Prafulla Kumar Neogi	3,074	3.68	New entry
MFB	Birendra Lal De Sarkar	2,742	3.28	New entry
MFB	Samuel Subhan	1,610	1.93	New entry
Majority		2,689	3.22	New entry
Turnout		83,481	83.64	New entry
INC win (new seat)				
