= Sankar Chakraborty =

Indian politician and advocate

Minister of Public Works Department
- In office 2013–2016
- Succeeded by: Aroop Biswas

MLA
- In office 2011–2016
- Preceded by: Biswanath Chowdhury
- Succeeded by: Biswanath Chowdhury
- Constituency: Balurghat (Vidhan Sabha constituency)

Personal details
- Born: 1945 (age 80–81) Balurghat
- Party: All India Trinamool Congress
- Education: University of Calcutta (M.Com), (L.L.B)

Shankar Chakravorty (alternate spelling: Sankar Chakraborty) is an Indian politician and a trial lawyer from Balurghat, District-Dakshin Dinajpur, West Bengal, India. He is presently the chairman (cabinet rank) of the board of directors of three state run PSUs namely Mackintosh Burn Ltd., Westinghouse Saxby Farmer Ltd. and Britannia Engineering Ltd.

He was formerly the vice president of the state committee of All India Trinamool Congress.

He was the minister in charge of P.W.D., Dept. of Cooperation, Dept. of Renewable Energy, Dept. of Correctional Administration in the Council of Ministers of the Government of West Bengal in various phases. He was an MLA, elected from the Balurghat constituency in the 2011 West Bengal state assembly election. In 2016, he closely lost the same position. He was formerly a member of the board of administrators of Balurghat Municipality.

He was previously the chairman and president of the Dakshin Dinajpur district committee of All India Trinamool Congress. He was also a member of the Board of Administrators of Balurghat Municipality.

== Early life and education ==
Shankar Chakravorty was born in 1945. He is the son of Byomkesh Chakravorti, who was a member of the West Bengal Legislative Council. He did his schooling from Balurghat High School. He holds a post-graduate degree in commerce and a degree in law from the University of Calcutta.

== Legal career ==
He was appointed special public prosecutor in the Rainagar multiple murder case. The incident happened on July 31, 1987 at Rainagar village near Balurghat town. Incidentally, the district court awarded death penalty to the perpetrators. This was later upheld by the High Court.

As a lawyer, Shankar Chakravorty was actively associated with a case in which Mamata Banerjee herself appeared as a lawyer in Balurghat Court in order to get bail for a group of students who were detained by the police. Mamata Banerjee, Shankar Chakravorty, Biplab Mitra, Subash Chaki (lawyer and politician) and a few other lawyers were instrumental in this case where the students were finally granted bail by the Honourable Court. Mamata Banerjee has chronicled this whole incident in her book Upalabdhi.

Political offices
Preceded by ?	Minister of Public Works Department in the West Bengal Government ? – ?	Succeeded by ?
State Legislative Assembly
Preceded by Biswanath Chowdhury	Member of the West Bengal Legislative Assembly from Balurghat Assembly constituency 2011– 2016	Succeeded by Biswanath Chowdhury
