= I. G. Patel =

Indian banker

Indraprasad Gordhanbhai Patel
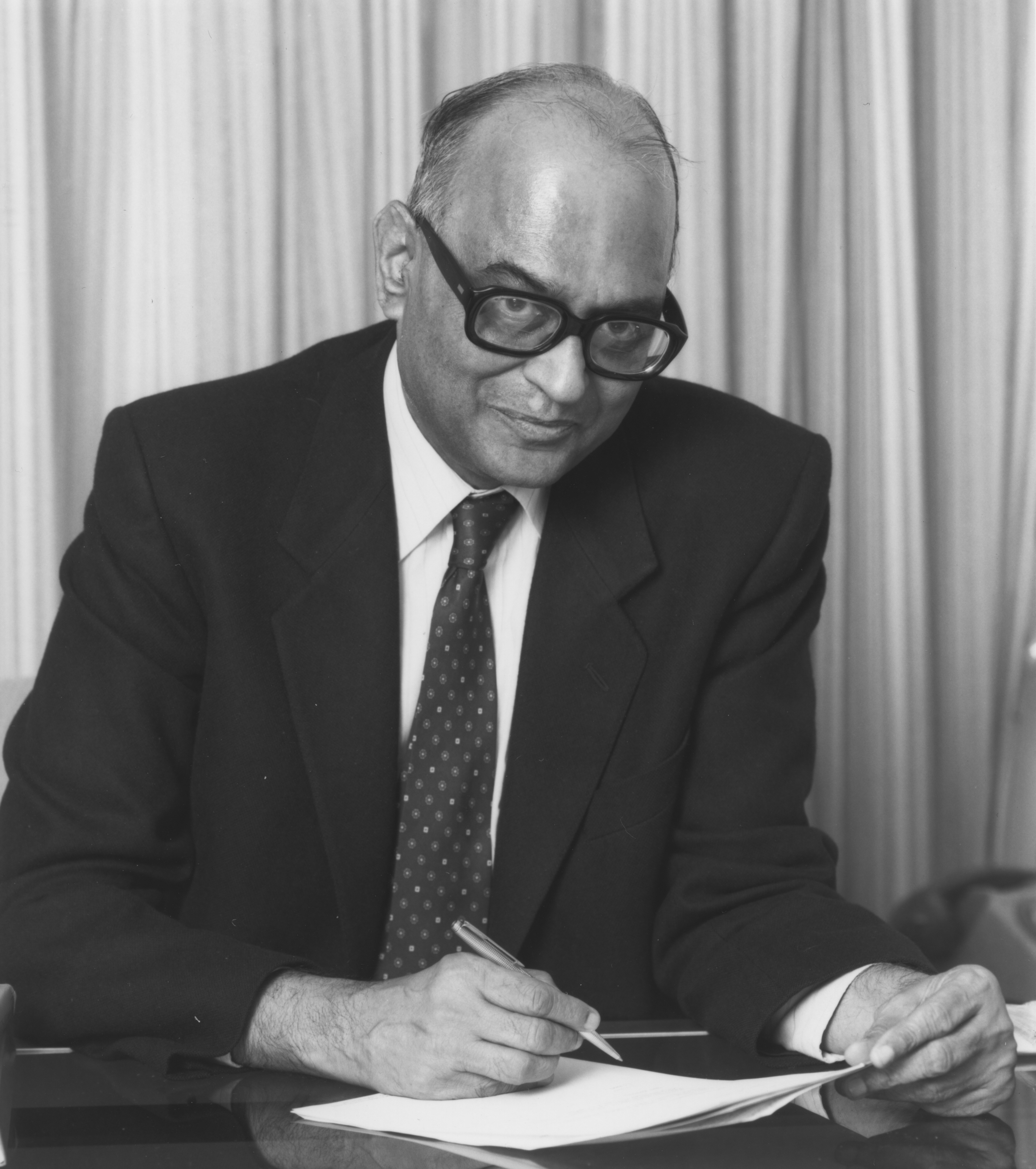
- I. G. Patel, 1984

9th Director of the London School of Economics and Political Science
- In office 1984–1990
- Preceded by: Ralf Dahrendorf
- Succeeded by: John Ashworth

14th Governor of the Reserve Bank of India
- In office 1 December 1977 – 15 September 1982
- Preceded by: M. Narasimham
- Succeeded by: Manmohan Singh

Deputy Administrator of United Nations Development Programme
- In office 1972–1977

2nd Chief Economic Advisor to the Government of India
- In office 1965–1967
- In office 1961–1963

Personal details
- Born: 11 November 1924 Vadodara, Gujarat, India
- Died: 17 July 2005 (aged 80) New York City, U.S.
- Resting place: Vadodara, Gujarat, India
- Citizenship: ]
- Spouse: Alakanada Patel
- Education: University of Mumbai; King's College, Cambridge (PhD)
- Occupation: Economist; Indian Economic Service
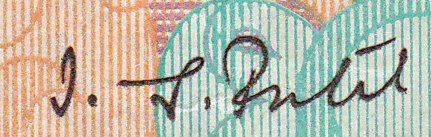
- Signature

Indraprasad Gordhanbhai Patel (11 November 1924 – 17 July 2005), popularly known as I. G. Patel, was an Indian economist and civil servant who is best known as the fourteenth Governor of the Reserve Bank of India, and the ninth director of the London School of Economics and Political Science (LSE).

As LSE's director, Patel was the first person of Indian origin to head a higher education institution in the United Kingdom. After his stint at LSE, Patel served as Chairman of the Indian Institute of Management Ahmedabad. He was well known for his formidable intellectual powers in the select company of elite central bankers and statesmen such as the "Committee of the Thirty" set up by the former German Chancellor Helmut Schmidt.

He also served as Deputy Administrator at the United Nations Development Programme headquarters in New York.

== Education ==
Patel stood first in the Matriculation examination and established a record score that was never beaten. He then came top in his B.A. at the University of Bombay. He later earned Doctor of Philosophy in economics from King's College at University of Cambridge with a scholarship from the Gaekwads of Baroda. Patel chose to write his PhD dissertation on “Foreign Trade and Economic Development”. His tutor Austin Robinson regarded him as his best tutee over his entire tenure as a fellow of King's

== Career ==
=== Civil Service ===
He was a member of the Indian Economic Service and served in Government of India. He held the rank and post of Special Secretary in the Ministry of Finance and later Secretary to Government of India (Economic Affairs) in the Ministry of Finance.

=== Academic career ===
Patel returned to India and joined Baroda College as a Professor of Economics and as the Principal in 1949. Edward M. Bernstein, later his mentor, invited him to join the Research Department of the International Monetary Fund in 1950. After five years there, Patel came back to Delhi as an Economic Adviser to the Ministry of Finance in 1954 and spent the next 18 years in one or another top capacity in the Government of India.

In 1972 he became the Deputy Administrator of the UN Development Programme for five years, returning only to take up the position of the Governor of the Reserve Bank of India. It was during this period marked by turbulence in the foreign exchange markets that Patel's formidable intellectual powers came into use in sessions of the Bank for International Settlements. In 1982 he was appointed Director of the Indian Institute of Management, Ahmedabad, which he helped launch on a trajectory to become the best management school in India.

But again Patel was picked up to serve abroad. In 1984, he was chosen to be the Director of LSE, where he improved the school's finances and added several properties to its portfolio, as well as securing the freehold of the school's Old Building in Houghton Street. He had to handle student protests about LSE's investments in South Africa and their support of Winston Silcott, who had been convicted of the murder of a police officer in the Broadwater Farm riots in Tottenham. Patel handled both the situations with tact and firmness but also with a sympathetic understanding of students' concerns about racism. His initiatives, too, in setting up an innovative inter-departmental forum bore fruit in the Interdisciplinary Management Institute and the Development Studies Institute.

=== RBI Governor ===
The Indian Rupee notes of 1000, 5000 and 10,000 denominations and the gold auctions were demonetized during his tenure (he later featured on a special commemorative 1000 rupee note). However, the 1000 notes had to be reintroduced later.

In later life, he taught at the Maharaja Sayajirao University of Baroda, Vadodara. and in 1991 Patel was requested by then Prime Minister P. V. Narasimha Rao to assume the responsibility of the finance minister of India, but this offer was declined by him. He was bestowed the Padma Vibhushan award in 1991 for his furthering of the field of economic science. Indraprasad Gordhanbhai Patel was known as Baba 'IG' from his childhood days in Vadodara, then the capital of the princely state ruled by the Gaekwads of Baroda, where he was born. The post of I.G. Patel Professor of Economics and Government at the London School of Economics was created in his honour; it is currently held by Nicholas Stern.

== Personal life ==
He married Alaknanda Dasgupta, daughter of renowned professor of economics Amiya Kumar Dasgupta and sister of renowned economist Sir Partha Dasgupta.

Educational offices
| Preceded by Ralf Dahrendorf | Director of the London School of Economics; 1984–1990 | Succeeded by John Ashworth |
| Preceded by | Chairperson of the Board of Governors at Indian Institute of Management Ahmedabad; 1996 to 2001 | Succeeded by |
Government offices
| Preceded by JJ Anjaria | Chief Economic Adviser of India; 1961–1963; 1965-1967 | Succeeded by VK Ramaswamy |
| Preceded by M. Narasimham | Governor of the Reserve Bank of India; 1977–1982 | Succeeded by Manmohan Singh |
Diplomatic posts
| Preceded by | Deputy Administrator of the United Nations Development Programme; 1972–1977 | Succeeded by |
