= V. Anantha Nageswaran =

Indian economist (born 1963)

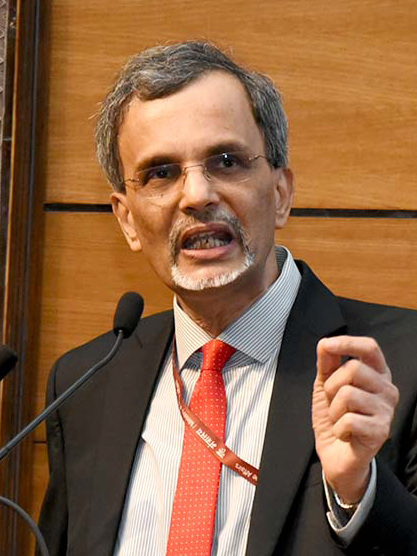

18th Chief Economic Advisor to the Government of India
- Incumbent
- Assumed office 28 January 2022
- Prime Minister: Narendra Modi
- Minister: Nirmala Sitharaman
- Preceded by: Krishnamurthy Subramanian

Personal details
- Born: 1963 (age 62–63)
- Education: American College, Madurai (BCom); IIM Ahmedabad (MBA); University of Massachusetts Amherst (PhD)
- Profession: Economist

Venkatramanan Anantha Nageswaran (born in 1963) is an Indian economist who is currently serving as the Chief Economic Advisor to the Government of India. He previously served as the global chief investment officer at Bank Julius Baer in Switzerland after serving as its Head of Research for Asia. Prior to this, he worked for Credit Suisse in Switzerland and Singapore, and for the Union Bank of Switzerland (now UBS). He has served as the Dean of IFMR Graduate School of Business, as a professor for graduate students at the Singapore Management University, and at the Indian Institute of Management Bangalore & Indian Institute of Management Indore.

== Early life and education ==
Nageswaran completed his schooling education in Railway Mixed Higher School (RMHSS), Madurai. In 1983 Nageswaran graduated with BCom degree from American College, Madurai and in 1985 he obtained his Masters in Business Administration from Indian Institute of Management (IIM), Ahmedabad. He later earned Doctor of Philosophy in finance from Isenberg School of Management at University of Massachusetts Amherst in 1994 for his research about 'Empirical behavior of Exchange Rates'

== Career ==
In his corporate career spanning seventeen years from 1994 to 2011, he was a Currency Economist at the Union Bank of Switzerland, Head of Research and Investment Consulting in Credit Suisse Private Banking in Asia, head of Asia Research and then global chief investment officer at Bank Julius Baer, Switzerland

He was the dean of the IFMR Graduate School of Business and a visiting professor of economics at Krea University. Nageswaran has been an adjunct faculty with the Singapore Management University and with the Wealth Management Institute at the Nanyang Technological University.

He was a member of the board of directors at TVS supply chain and Sundaram Fasteners and served on the advisory boards of TVS Capital and Global Alliance for Mass Entrepreneurship (GAME).

He was appointed as an honorary advisor to Indian Financial Services Authority.

He is the co founder of the Aavishkaar India Venture Capital fund, a pioneer in impact investing. He has invested in several Indian startups directly as well as through Aavishkar India.

He is also the Co founder of Takshashila Institute-a leading think tank for research and education in Public Policy.

=== Prime Minister's Economic Advisory Council ===
He was a part time member of Economic Advisory Council to the Prime Minister from 2019 to 2021.

=== Ministry of Finance ===
On 28 January 2022, the Government of India appointed him as the Chief Economic Advisor succeeding Krishnamurthy Subramanian, who completed his three-year term in December 2021. In 2025, the Appointments Committee of the Cabinet extended his tenure upto March 2027.

== Bibliography ==
- Economics of Derivatives (March 2015), Cambridge University Press. Co-authored with T. V. Somanathan
- Can India Grow?: Challenges, Opportunities, and the Way Forward (November 2016), Carnegie Endowment for International Peace. Co-authored with Gulzar Natarajan.
- Derivatives (October 2017), Cambridge University Press. Co-authored with T. V. Somanathan.
- The Rise of Finance: Causes, Consequences and Cures (April 2019), Cambridge University Press. Co-authored with Gulzar Natarajan.

Government offices
Preceded by Krishnamurthy Subramanian	Chief Economic Adviser of India; 2022–	Incumbent
