= Chief Economic Advisor to the Government of India =

India government post

Chief Economic Advisor
- मुख्य आर्थिक सलाहकार
- Emblem of India
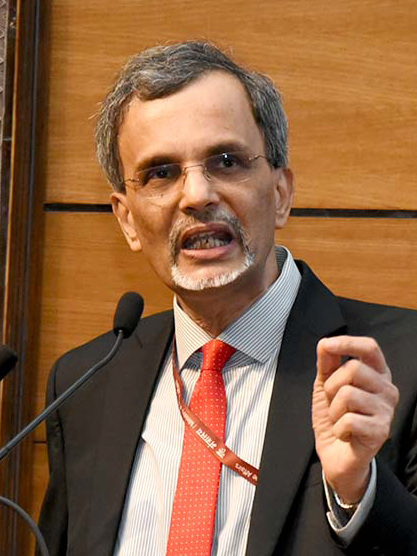
- Incumbent; V Anantha Nageswaran since 28 January 2022
- Appointer: Appointments Committee of the Cabinet

The Chief Economic Adviser to the Government of India (CEA or Chief Economic Advisor of India) advises the government on economic matters and is responsible for the preparation of the Economic survey of India tabled in Parliament before the Union budget of India is presented.

The CEA holds the rank of a Secretary to the Government of India. The CEA is the ex-officio cadre-controlling authority of the Indian Economic Service. The CEA is head of Economic Division of the Department of Economic Affairs, Ministry of Finance, Government of India. Until 2009, the CEA’s position was a Union Public Service Commission appointment and until the 1970s almost all CEAs were members of the Indian Economic Service.

One CEA, Manmohan Singh went on to become the Prime Minister of India. Four CEAs have gone on to become the Governor of the Reserve Bank of India - I. G. Patel, Manmohan Singh, Bimal Jalan and Raghuram Rajan, and one (Rakesh Mohan) became the Deputy Governor of the RBI.

== History ==
Until 2009, the post of Chief Economic Advisor to the Government of India was a Union Public Service Commission appointment and until the 1970s almost all CEAs were members of the Indian Economic Service.

== Role ==
The extent to which the Government takes into account the advice of the Chief Economic Adviser has generally been considered to be open-ended.

In his 2018 book titled Of Counsel: The Challenges of the Modi-Jaitley Economy, former CEA Arvind Subramanian stated that the job of the CEA carried no executive responsibility. According to him, the only clearly defined job of the CEA was to produce the Economic Survey of India preceding the Union Budget.

== List of CEAs ==
Below is a list of Chief Economic Advisers that have been appointed by the Government of India since Independence in 1947.

S.No	Name	Portrait	Assumed office	Left office	Prime Minister
1	JJ Anjaria		1956	1961	Jawaharlal Nehru
2	IG Patel	I. G. Patel	1961	1964	Jawaharlal Nehru
2	IG Patel	I. G. Patel	1964	1966	Lal Bahadur Shastri
2	IG Patel	I. G. Patel	1966	1967	Indira Gandhi
3	V. K. Shivram		1967	1969	Indira Gandhi
4	Ashok Mitra		1970	1972	Indira Gandhi
5	Manmohan Singh		1972	1976	Indira Gandhi
6	R. M. Krishnamurthy		1977	1979	Morarji Desai
6	R. M. Krishnamurthy		1977	1979	Charan Singh
7	Bimal Jalan		1981	1984	Indira Gandhi
7	Bimal Jalan		1984	1988	Rajiv Gandhi
8	Nitin Desai		1988	1988	Rajiv Gandhi
8	Nitin Desai		1988	1989	V. P. Singh
9	Deepak Nayyar		1989	1990	V. P. Singh
9	Deepak Nayyar		1990	1991	Chandra Shekhar
9	Deepak Nayyar		1991	1991	P. V. Narasimha Rao
10	Shankar Acharya		1993	1996	P. V. Narasimha Rao
10	Shankar Acharya		1996	1997	H. D. Deve Gowda
10	Shankar Acharya		1997	1998	Inder Kumar Gujral
10	Shankar Acharya		1998	2001	Atal Bihari Vajpayee
11	Rakesh Mohan		2001	2002	Atal Bihari Vajpayee
12	Ashok K Lahiri		2002	2004	Atal Bihari Vajpayee
12	Ashok K Lahiri		2004	2007	Manmohan Singh
13	Arvind Virmani		2007	2009	Manmohan Singh
14	Kaushik Basu	Kaushik Basu	2009	2012	Manmohan Singh
15	Raghuram Rajan		10 August 2012	4 September 2013	Manmohan Singh
16	Arvind Subramanian	Arvind Subrahmaniyam	16 October 2014	20 June 2018	Narendra Modi
17	Krishnamurthy Subramanian		7 December 2018	7 December 2021	Narendra Modi
18	V Anantha Nageswaran		28 January 2022	Incumbent	Narendra Modi

== See also ==
- List of office-holders in India
- Principal Scientific Adviser to the Government of India
