= Tej Parikh =

British economist and writer

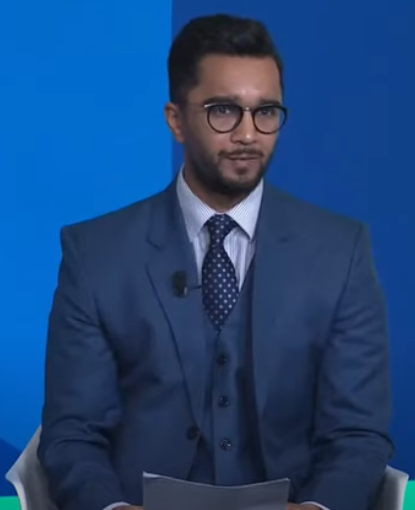
- At the World Economic Forum's Growth Summit 2023
- Occupations: Economist; writer

Tej Parikh is a British political and economic commentator.

Parikh was Chief Economist of the Institute of Directors, a private-sector employer lobbyist, from 2017 to 2021. Between 2015 and 2016 he worked as a journalist for The Cambodia Daily in Phnom Penh. He is currently Director of Economics at American credit ratings agency Fitch Ratings.

== Biography ==
At the IoD between 2017 and 2021, Parikh appeared in the media and parliament as an advocate for SME's during Brexit and the COVID-19 pandemic. He left the IoD in 2021 to become Director of Economics at Fitch Ratings. Kitty Ussher, a former Labour Party MP, succeeded him as Chief Economist in September 2021.

Prior to joining the IoD, he was an associate editor and reporter for The Cambodia Daily in Phnom Penh, where he wrote articles about Cambodia's economic and political development. His articles have also featured in Foreign Affairs, Foreign Policy, Reuters, and The Asia Times, covering international affairs and public policy.
