= Economic survey of India =

Indian Ministry of Finance report

The Economic Survey of India is an annual document of the Ministry of Finance, Government of India. The Department of Economic Affairs presents the Survey in Parliament every year, just before the Union Budget. India's Chief Economic Adviser guides its preparation. This document is presented to both Houses of Parliament during the Budget Session.

The first Economic Survey of India was presented in 1950-51 as part of the Union Budget. After 1964, it was separated from the Budget and presented each year during the Budget Session before the presentation of the budget. The document is non-binding. Nevertheless the survey is constructed and presented each year because of its significance.

== Content ==
The document is an overview of the state of the Indian economy. The Survey reviews developments in the Indian economy over the past financial year, summarises performance on major indicators, and highlights government policy initiatives, along with short- to medium-term prospects.

== Current edition ==
=== Economic survey of India 2022 ===
The Survey has been tabled by the Finance Minister Nirmala Sitharaman on January 31 that details the state of the economy ahead of the government's Budget for the fiscal year beginning April 1, 2022. The survey acknowledges the support from the Ministers of State for Finance Shri Pankaj Chaudhary and Bhagwat Kishanrao Karad, Finance Secretary T. V. Somanathan, Secretary DEA Ajay Seth and Revenue Secretary Tarun Bajaj.

The Economic Survey 2021-22 details the state of different sectors of the economy as well as reforms that should be undertaken to accelerate growth.

The gross domestic product (GDP) contracted by 7.3 percent in 2020–21. As per the Survey, India's economic response to devastation caused by pandemic has been supply-side reforms rather than demand management.

- Growth in FY23 to be supported by widespread vaccine coverage, supply-side reforms and liberalised regulations.
- The Survey says that the Indian government's capital expenditure grew by 13.5 percent on-year in Apl to Nov, with a focus on infrastructure-intensive sectors like roads, highways, railways, housing and urban affairs. The total capital expenditure rose to Rs 2.74 lakh crore in April–November 2021-22 as compared to Rs 2.41 lakh crore last year.
- The Indian banking system appears to weathered the pandemic shock well even if there was some lagged impact in the pipeline, said the 2022 Economic Survey.
- Robust export growth and availability of fiscal space to ramp up capital spending to support growth is inevitable.
- As per the Survey, India's economic response to devastation caused by pandemic has been supply-side reforms rather than demand management. Government finances to witness consolidation in 2021–22, after uptick in deficit and debt indicators during pandemic year FY21.
- Gross Fixed Capital Formation (GFCF) is expected to have strong growth of 15 percent in 2021-22 and achieve full recovery at pre-pandemic level.
- A number of conventional and unconventional measures were taken to maintain the orderly market conditions to ensure that the increased financial needs of the governments are met smoothly, while keeping in mind the major objectives of cost minimization, risk mitigation and market development. Supported by these measures, the weighted average cost of the Government on dated securities during 2020-21 was at a 17-year low of 5.79 percent, despite a 141.2 percent jump in net market borrowings.

Economic Survey 2021-22 warned India to be wary of imported inflation. The Survey said as the wholesale price-based inflation (WPI) during the current financial year, in contrast to the trends observed in the Consumer Price Index (CPI) inflation, has shown an increasing trend, and remained high. The Survey calls for improving productivity of small and marginal farmers through small holding farm technologies. The Survey states that climate finance will remain critical to successful climate action for India to achieve its Net Zero Carbon Emission target by 2070. Crop diversification towards oilseeds, pulses and horticulture needs to be given priority, the Survey mentions. Encouraging farmers to shift from cultivation of rice and wheat to pulses and oilseeds would help ensure that the country is self-reliant in pulses and oilseeds and also assist in reducing import dependence.

The Economic Survey also warned that the new restrictions introduced across the globe due to the spread of the Omicron variant of coronavirus pose a threat to tourism as well as domestic passenger traffic in the near term. Vaccination is not merely a health response but is critical for opening up the economy, particularly contact-intensive services. Therefore, it should be treated for now as a macro-economic indicator.

Principal Economic Advisor Sanjeev Sanyal, while addressing the press, said agriculture sector, "not surprisingly, was least affected by lockdowns of various kinds". This sector grew in even 2020-21 and again in 2021–22. Industrial sector, on other hand, did go through a contraction and now it is about 4.1 percent above pre-pandemic levels, he added. India's overall GVA grew by 8.6 percent on year in 2021–22, after contracting 6.2% in 2020–21, PEA Sanjeev Sanyal said. Sanyal added that India now has $636 billion worth of forex reserves, one of the highest in the world, and equivalent to 13.2 months of imports. The principal economic advisor further said that India's spending on social services has risen to around Rs 20 lakh crore in 2021–22, whereas, the spending on education and health has risen to Rs 6.97 lakh crore and Rs 4.72 lakh crore in the same period, respectively.

== Previous editions ==
=== Economic Survey of India 2020 ===
The Economic Survey 2019–20 was tabled during the Budget Session of the Parliament on 31 January 2020 by Nirmala Sitharaman, Minister of Finance. The survey was prepared under Krishnamurthy Subramanian, the Chief Economic Advisor (CEA) to the Government of India. The survey is also presented by the CEA during a press meet after it is tabled in Parliament.

This year the survey was printed in lavender, the same colour as the 100-rupee note, symbolizing the integration of old and new. The broad theme for the survey is "Ethical Wealth Creation". The document outlines strategies for making India a $5 trillion economy by 2024–25. This includes strengthening the invisible hand of the Indian economy through trust in pro-business government intervention and trust in the markets; while at the same time moving away from "pro-crony" policy and focusing on ethical wealth creation.

The survey covers the economic performance India in 2019–20 including fiscal developments, external sector developments, monetary management and financial intermediation, inflation, sustainable development and climate change, agriculture and food management, industry and infrastructure, services sector, social infrastructure, employment and human development. Some of the key points raised by the survey were the need for grassroots entrepreneurship, pro-business and pro-market differentiation, policies that do not undermine the markets, job and growth creation, improving the ease of doing business in India, creation of early warning health system for the NBFC sector, privatization and thalinomics.

==== Ethical wealth creation ====
The importance of "Ethical Wealth Creation" as a basis for the economy is emphasized upon. Reference to the Arthashastra, Tirukkural and The Wealth of Nations is made. Through these texts, the Survey documents that ideas of wealth creation are rooted in India's rich traditions. The Survey notes that India's past dominance in economic matters was not by chance, but design.

==== Highlights ====
Some of the key points of the Economic Survey 2019–20 are:

- The survey projects India's growth at 6–6.5% in the next fiscal year starting from 1 April 2020.
- The survey provides facts to show that India's GDP figures are genuine.
- The industrial growth for the current year has been listed as 2.5% while the agricultural growth is 2.8%.
- Total formal employment has increased from 2011–12. About 2.6 crore new jobs were created between 2011–12 and 2017–18.
- The survey has a section called thalinomics which shows an increase in affordability of a vegetarian thali by 29% and by non-vegetarian by 18% during 2006–07 to 2019–20.
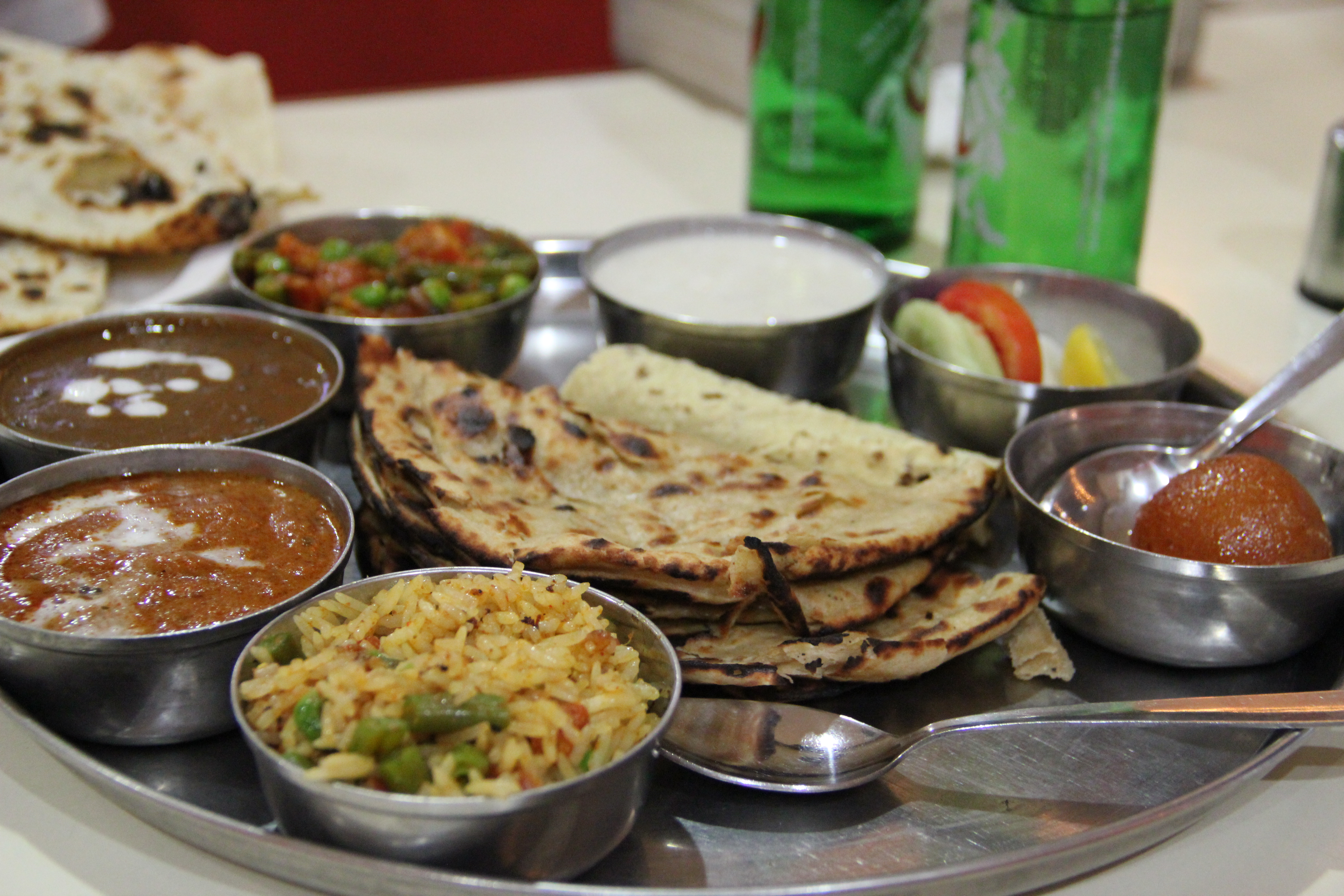
  Punjabi style vegetarian thali served in a restaurant.
- India is on a growth path that delivers sustainable development and has a holistic approach towards climate change.
- India is on track to achieve its "Nationally Determined Contributions (NDCs) under Paris Agreement in accordance with principles Common but Differentiated Responsibilities."
- India has emphasized on clean, enhanced and efficient energy systems, resilient urban expansion, and progressive transportation networks.
- All urban areas of 35 states and union territories have become open-defecation free and percentage of waste processing has risen by over 40%.
- The survey also acknowledged the efforts of Unnat Jeevan by Affordable LEDs and Appliances for All (UJALA) and the launch of India's initiative—Coalition for Disaster Resilient Infrastructure.
- India has the second largest emerging green bond market in the world.
- The survey suggests the government to systematically withdraw from certain areas of the markets.
- Easier ways to start new business, pay taxes and enforce contracts.
- The Assemble in India for the world strategy to go hand in hand with Make in India.
- The survey suggests mimicking the Chinese model for job creation.
- Band Baaja Baaraat was given reference to show Indian entrepreneurship.

The survey also had quotes from Shrimad Bhagavad Gita, Rigveda, Arthashastra and Tirukkural. Data for the survey relied on information from sources such as Bloomberg, IIM(B), Forbes, IMF, World Bank, RBI, Ministry of Corporate Affairs, Insolvency and Bankruptcy Board of India, the United Nations, and Wikipedia, among others.

=== Economic Survey of India 2021 ===
The Economic Survey 2020–21 was tabled during the Budget Session of the Parliament on 29 January 2021 by Nirmala Sitharaman, Minister of Finance. The survey was prepared under Krishnamurthy Subramanian, the Chief Economic Advisor (CEA) to the Government of India. The CEA also presents the survey during a press meet after it is tabled in Parliament.

The 2020-21 survey has been conducted in the background of the COVID-19 pandemic and the economic impact of the COVID-19 pandemic in India. A foundational theme of a survey as a result of the pandemic has been "Saving Lives and Livelihoods". The survey goes on to outline epidemiological and economic research related to lockdowns and minimizing losses when uncertainty is very high, in this case the loss being the loss of human life. The survey also notes how a "healthcare crisis can get transformed into an economic and social crisis".

Some of the key points of the Economic Survey 2020–21 are:

- The survey launches a 'Bare Necessities Index'.
- India is witnessing a V-shaped economic recovery.
- The survey covers over-regulation in the Indian economy. The example of the time taken to close a company in India, about 1600 days, was given.
- The survey dedicates a chapter to discuss India's sovereign credit rating.
- India needs to increase spending on research and development. India ranks 48th among 131 countries in the Global Innovation Index. However India is underperforming in innovation in terms of its GDP. India's Gross Expenditure on Research and Development (GERD) is suitable according to GDP but lacks behind a number of countries. India can successfully convert investment into innovation better than most countries.
- Ayushman Bharat Yojana has had positive impact in healthcare.

The survey has quotes and explanatory anecdotes from Mahabharata, Rabindranath Tagore, Raghuvansham, A.P.J.Abdul Kalam, Mohandas K. Gandhi, The Jungle Book (look for the bare necessities, the simple bare necessities), a recent India versus Australia cricket match, Tirukkuṟaḷ, 3 Idiots, Malgudi Days and Martin Luther King Jr.

=== Economic Survey of India 2017 ===
Unlike the traditional Economic Survey, the Economic Survey of India for 2016–17, prepared by Chief Economic Adviser Arvind Subramanian, did not have the detailed financial statistics of the Government of India.

== See also ==
- Economic history of India
- Economy of India
- Remittances to India
- Foreign trade of India
- List of exports of India
- Largest trading partners of India
