= Arvind Subramanian =

Indian economist and political adviser

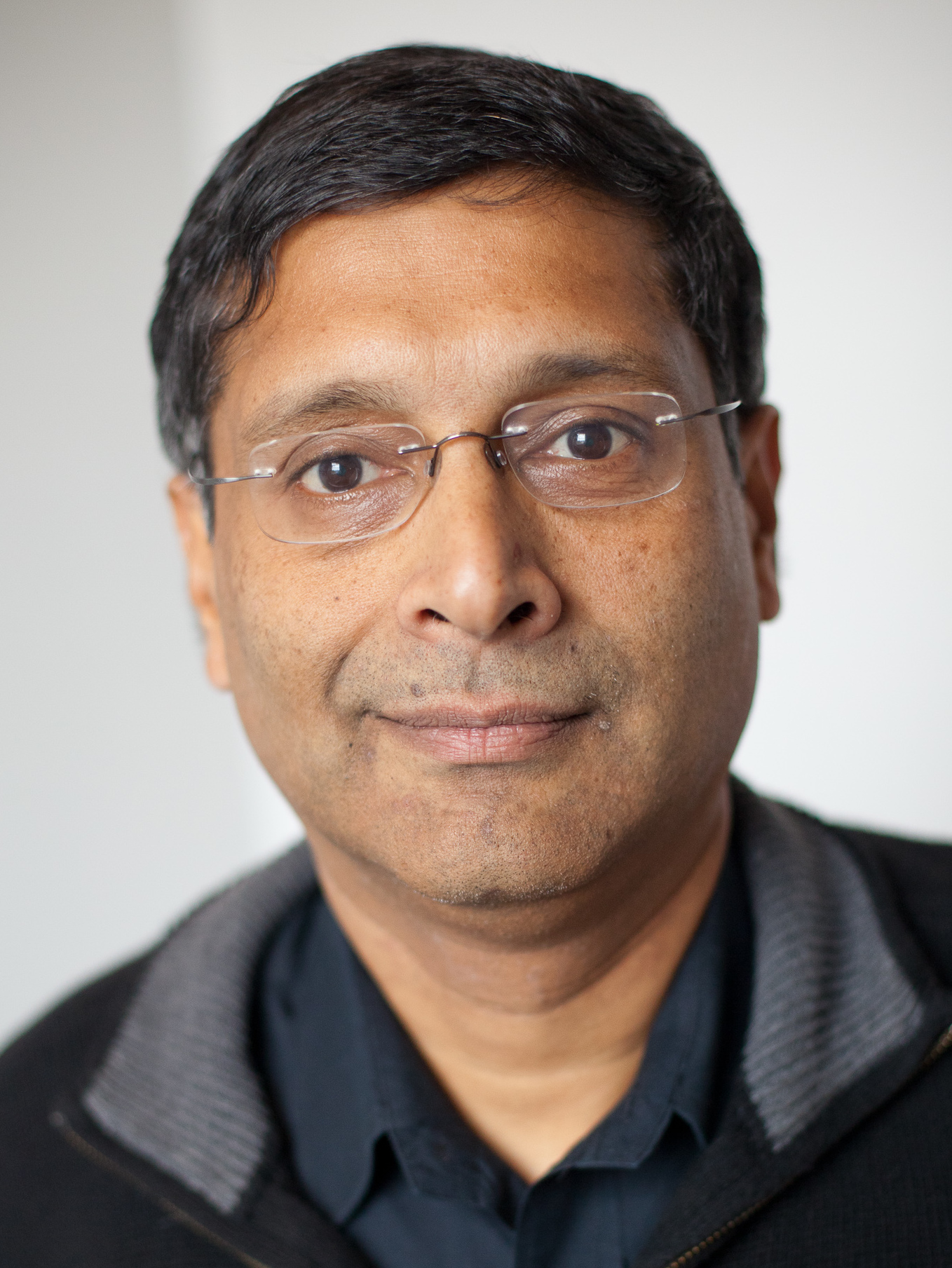

16th Chief Economic Advisor to the Government of India
- In office 16 October 2014 – 20 June 2018
- Preceded by: Raghuram Rajan
- Succeeded by: Krishnamurthy Subramanian

Personal details
- Born: 7 June 1959 (age 67) Chennai, Tamil Nadu, India
- Education: St. Stephen's College, Delhi; Delhi University (BA); Indian Institute of Management, Ahmedabad (MBA); University of Oxford (MPhil, DPhil)
- Profession: Economist

Arvind Subramanian is an Indian economist and the former Chief Economic Advisor to the Government of India, having served from 16 October 2014 to 20 June 2018. Subramanian is currently a Senior Fellow at the Watson Institute for International and Public Affairs at Brown University. He previously served as Professor of Economics at Ashoka University and a Senior Fellow at the Peterson Institute for International Economics and Center for Global Development.

A former economist at the International Monetary Fund, Subramanian is a widely cited expert on the economics of India, China, and the changing balance of global economic power. He is the author of two books, India's Turn: Understanding the Economic Transformation (2008), Eclipse: Living in the Shadow of China's Economic Dominance (2011), and co-author of Who Needs to Open the Capital Account? (2012) and A Sixth of Humanity: Independent India’s Development Odyssey (2025).

In 2011, Foreign Policy magazine named Subramanian one of the world's top 100 global thinkers.

== Education ==
Subramanian attended the D.A.V. Boys Senior Secondary School in Chennai for his high school education. He proceeded to St. Stephen's College, Delhi, for his graduation, where he obtained a B.A. (Hons.) in Economics. He subsequently earned an MBA from the Indian Institute of Management, Ahmedabad, and M.Phil & D.Phil degrees from the University of Oxford on an Inlaks Scholarship.

== Career ==
Subramanian was the Assistant Director in the Research Department of the International Monetary Fund. He is a development economist who worked closely with former Reserve Bank of India Governor Raghuram Rajan when both were at the International Monetary Fund. He served at the GATT during the Uruguay Round of trade negotiations. He taught at Harvard University's Kennedy School of Government from 1999 to 2000 and Johns Hopkins' Paul H. Nitze School of Advanced International Studies from 2008 to 2010.

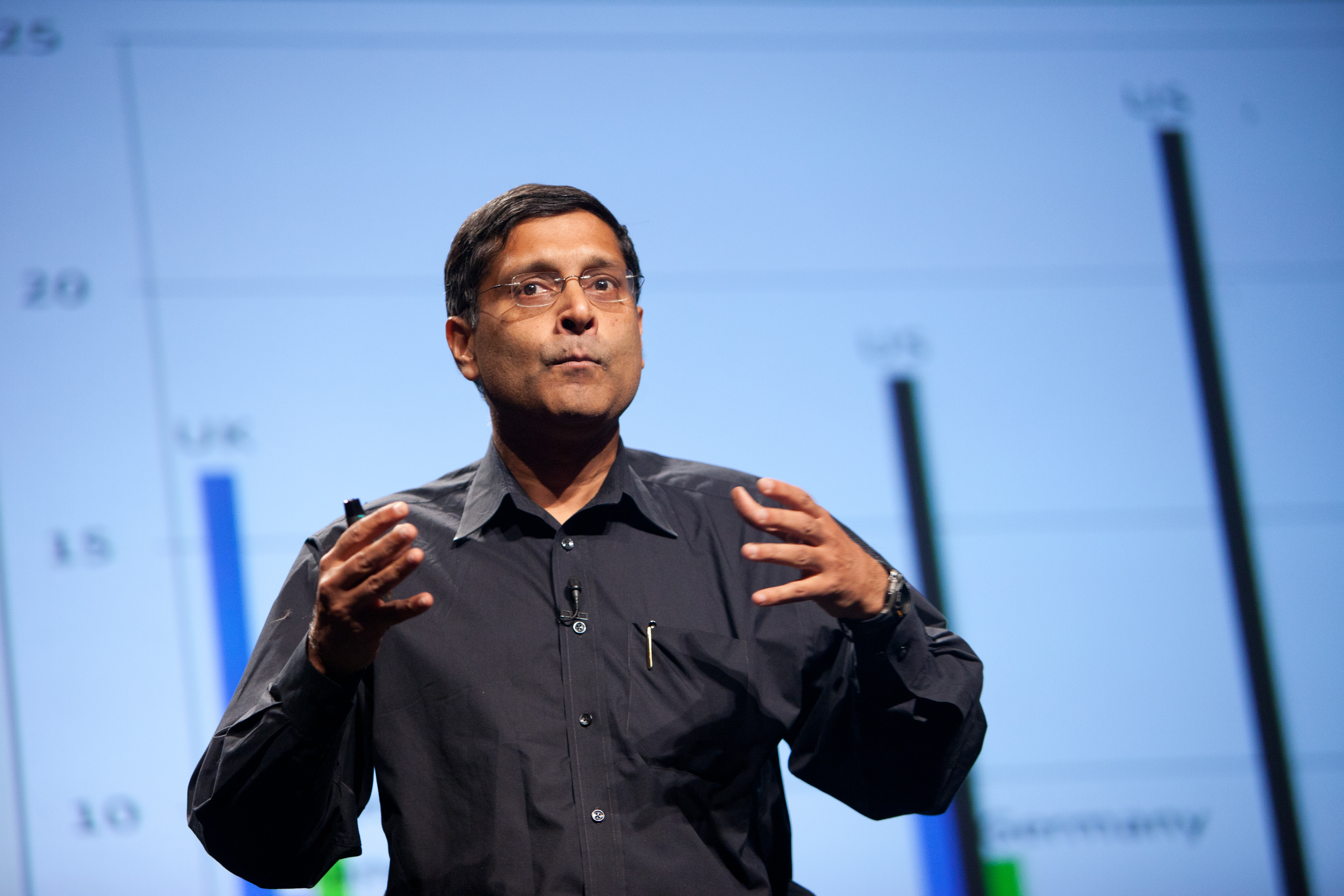
Subramanian at the 2011 PopTech conference in Camden, Maine

=== Chief Economic Advisor (2014–2018) ===
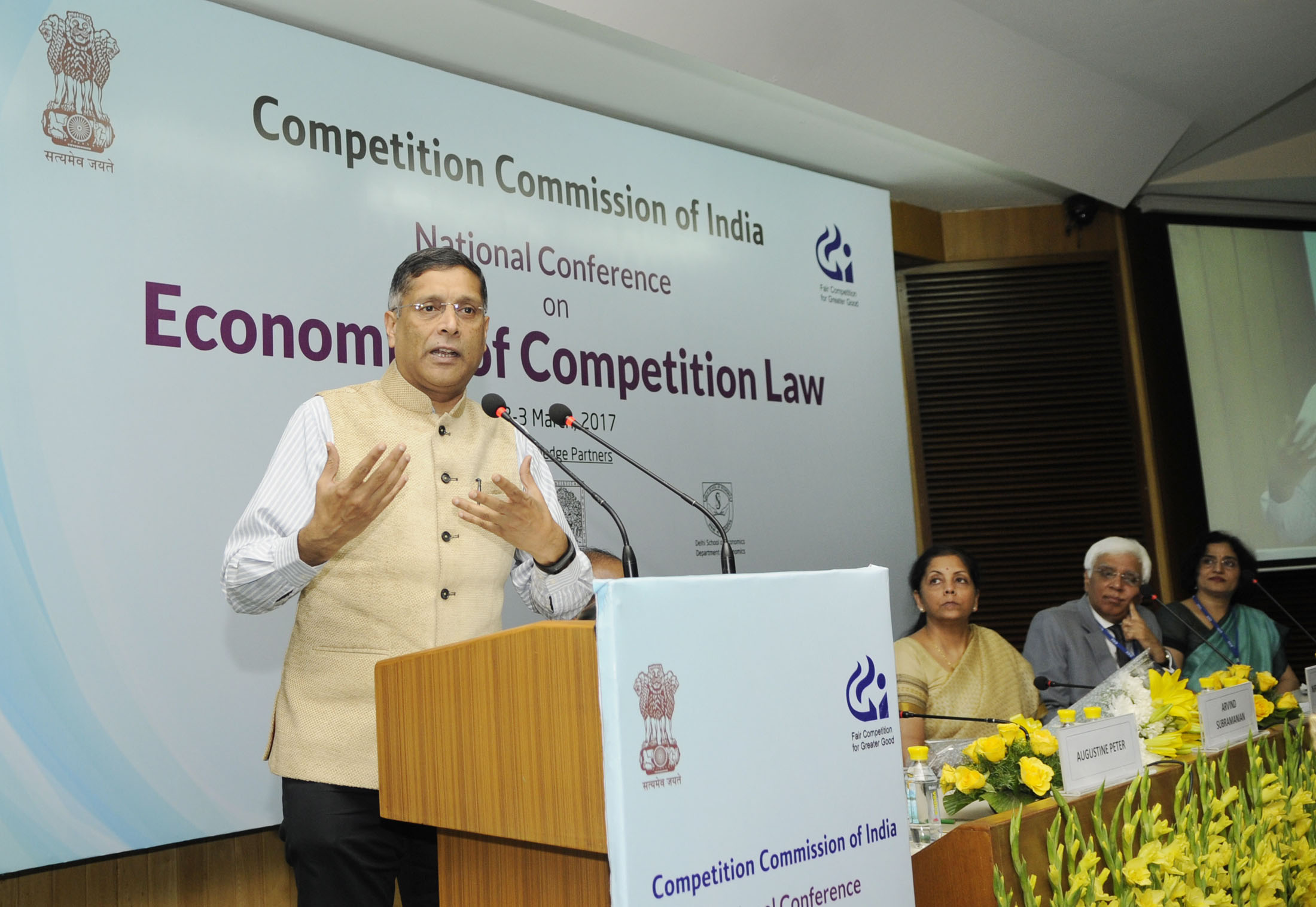
Subramanian delivering an address during his tenure as Chief Economic Advisor

In October 2014, he was appointed the Chief Economic Advisor (CEA) to Indian government. The post had been lying vacant since Raghuram Rajan left the finance ministry to join as governor of the Reserve Bank of India in September 2013. After his three-year term ended in 2017, he was given a year's extension.

On 20 June 2018, finance minister Arun Jaitley announced that owing to family commitments, Subramanian would be stepping down before the scheduled end of his tenure to return to academia in the US. Jaitley noted that Subramanian's early diagnosis of the twin balance-sheet led to the government outlining higher public investment in the union budget of 2015–16. He also credited Subramanian with conceptualizing the Jan Dhan-Aadhaar-Mobile trinity, or JAM, as a data base of citizens for availing public benefits.

In his role as the CEA, Subramanian was responsible for bringing out the annual Economic Survey of India, traditionally released prior to the presentation of the union budget in the Indian parliament. He is widely credited with revamping the presentation of information through the surveys, making them wider in scope and accessible to a larger audience.

=== 2018–present ===
From 2018 to 2020, Subramanian served as a Visiting Lecturer at Harvard University's Kennedy School. He was a subsequently Professor of Economics at Ashoka University, but resigned from his post citing the circumstances surrounding the resignation of Pratap Bhanu Mehta.

In 2021, Subramanian joined the Watson Institute for International and Public Affairs at Brown University as a Senior Fellow in International and Public Affairs.

In 2024, Subramanian criticised the Indian government's claims of economic growth, saying "I can't understand the latest GDP numbers, they are mystifying, and don't add up."

== Publications ==
Subramanian has authored essays and other publications on growth, trade, development, institutions, aid, oil, India, Africa, and the World Trade Organization (WTO). He has been widely published in academic and other journals (including the American Economic Review (Papers and Proceedings), Review of Economics and Statistics, Journal of International Economics, Journal of Monetary Economics, Journal of Public Economics, Journal of Economic Growth, Journal of Development Economics, Brookings Papers on Economic Activity, Oxford Review of Economic Policy, International Monetary Fund Staff Papers, Foreign Affairs, World Economy, and Economic and Political Weekly.)

He has also been cited in leading magazines and newspapers, including the Economist, Financial Times, The Washington Post, The New York Times, The Wall Street Journal, Newsweek, and New York Review of Books. He contributes frequently to the Financial Times and is a columnist in India's leading financial daily, Business Standard.

== Controversies ==
In March 2013, Subramanian, then a Senior Fellow at the Peterson Institute and CGD, appeared before United States House Committee on Ways and Means hearing on "US–India Trade Relations: Opportunities and Challenges." During his testimony, he stated that "by discriminating against Indian companies and exporters, [US initiatives] will exert natural pressure on India to open up".

== Personal life ==
Arvind Subramanian is married to Parul Subramanian and together they have three children. His elder brother is V. S. Krishnan, a retired Indian Revenue Service Officer and former Member of the Central Board of Excise and Customs (CBEC) and was a key player in piloting the Goods and Service Tax Bill.

He is fond of both Indian and Western classical music, and owns a large collection of music cassettes. He is interested in tennis and Arsenal FC.
