= Anup Singh =

Anup Singh or Anoop Singh may refer to:

- Anup Singh of Bikaner (1638-1699), Mughal vassal of present-day India
- Anup Singh (politician) (1903–1969), Indian politician
- Anup Singh (filmmaker) (born 1961), Geneva based filmmaker
- Thakur Anoop Singh (born 1989), Indian actor
