= Bimal Jalan =

Indian Economist and bureaucrat

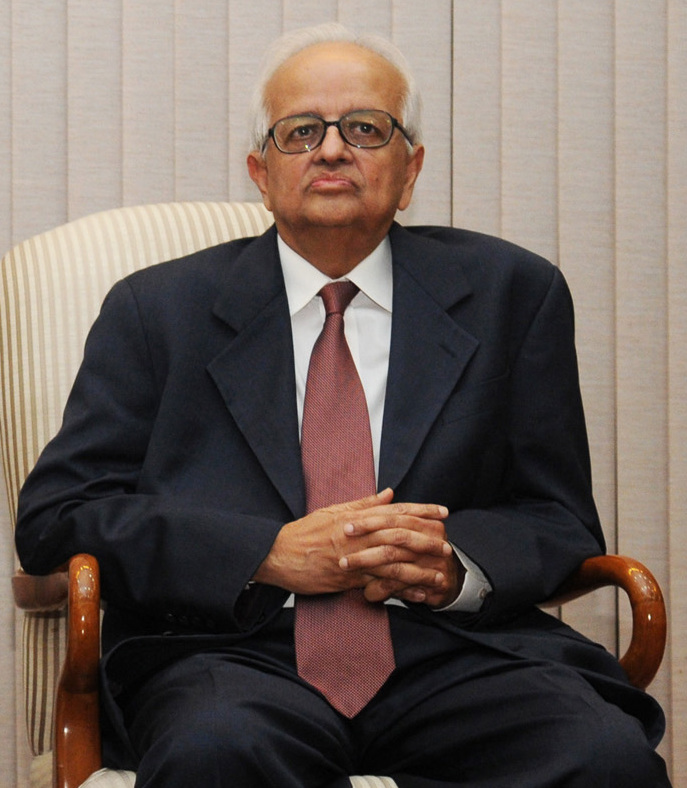
- Jalan in 2013

Member of Rajya Sabha
- In office 27 August 2003 - 26 August 2009

20th Governor of the Reserve Bank of India
- In office 22 November 1997 – 4 September 2003
- Preceded by: C Rangarajan
- Succeeded by: Y Venugopal Reddy

7th Chief Economic Adviser to the Government of India
- In office 1981 - 1988
- Preceded by: RM Honavar
- Succeeded by: Nitin Desai

Personal details
- Born: 3 July 1941 (age 85) Calcutta, British India
- Education: Presidency College (M.A.) University of Cambridge (M.Phil) University of Oxford (PhD) University of Bombay
- Occupation: Economist
- Website: http://www.bimaljalan.com/

Bimal Jalan (born on 3 July 1941) is an Indian economist and bureaucrat who served as 20th Governor of Reserve Bank of India. He also served as member of the Upper House of India's Parliament, the Rajya Sabha from 2003 to 2009.

== Education and career ==
Jalan graduated from Presidency College, Calcutta with a degree in economics from 1956 to 1960. He then completed his MA from the University of Cambridge then his Master of Philosophy from the University of Oxford and his PhD from the University of Bombay.

Jalan held several administrative and advisory positions in the Government of India, namely, Chief Economic Adviser in the 1980s, Banking Secretary between 1985 and 1989 and Finance Secretary, Ministry of Finance between January 1991 and September 1992. In 1992-93 and then from 1998–2008, Jalan was the President of the Governing Body of the National Council of Applied Economic Research, Planning Commission in New Delhi.

He was the Governor of Reserve Bank of India for two terms. The Government of India reappointed Jalan as Governor of the Reserve Bank of India, first for a period of five years commencing 22 November 1997 to 21 November 2002 and again for a further period of two years commencing from 22 November 2002 and ending 21 November 2004. He was succeeded by Y. Venugopal Reddy on 6 September 2003. During his tenure the Indian Rupee note of 1000 denomination was introduced.

== Selected works ==
- India's Economic Crisis: The Way Ahead (Oxford University Press, 1991)
- The Indian Economy: Problems and Prospects (editor) (Penguin, 1993).
- India's Economic Policy: Preparing for the Twenty-first Century (Viking, 1996) examines some of the critical policy choices for India at the present juncture.
- The Future of India Politics, Economics and Governance (Penguin, 2005).
- India's Politics: A view from the backbench (Penguin-Viking, 2007).
