= Fifteenth Finance Commission =

2017 finance commission of India

- १५वां वित्त आयोग
- State Emblem of India

Commission overview
- Formed: 27 November 2017; 8 years ago
- Preceding Commission: Fourteenth Finance Commission
- Dissolved: 26 November 2023
- Superseding Commission: Sixteenth Finance Commission
- Jurisdiction: Whole of India
- Headquarters: 15th Finance Commission, Jawahar Vyapar Bhawan, Tolstoy Marg, New Delhi; 28°37′29.8″N 77°13′11.5″E
- Minister responsible: Nirmala Sitharaman, Minister of Finance
- Deputy Minister responsible: Bhagwat Karad, Minister of State for Finance
- Commission executives: N. K. Singh, IAS, Chairman; Ajay Narayan Jha, IAS, Member; Prof. Anoop Singh, Member; Dr. Ashok Lahiri, Member; Prof. Ramesh Chand, Member (part-time)
- Parent department: Department of Economic Affairs, Ministry of Finance, Government of India
- Key documents: The Constitution of India (Article 280); The Finance Commission (Miscellaneous Provisions) Act, 1951 (Act no. 33 of 1951); S.O. 3755(E) (notification of formation of the commission)
- Website: fincomindia.nic.in

The Fifteenth Finance Commission (XV-FC or 15-FC) is an Indian Finance Commission constituted in November 2017 and is to give recommendations for devolution of taxes and other fiscal matters for five fiscal years, commencing 2020-04-01. The commission's chairman is Nand Kishore Singh, a senior member of the Bharatiya Janata Party (BJP) since March 2014, with its full-time members being Ajay Narayan Jha, Ashok Lahiri and Anoop Singh. In addition, the commission also has a part-time member in Ramesh Chand.

== Constitution ==
The Fifteenth Finance Commission was constituted by the Government of India—after getting ceremonial approval from President of India—through a notification in The Gazette of India on 2017-11-27. Nand Kishore Singh was appointed as the commission's chairman, with its full-time members being Shaktikanta Das and Anoop Singh and its part-time members being Ramesh Chand and Ashok Lahiri.

The commission held its first meeting on 2017-12-04. Lahiri was elevated to the status of a full-time member in May 2018 and was accorded the status of a minister of state. Das resigned as member on 11 December 2018, to become the Governor of Reserve Bank of India.

In July 2019, the commission's term was extended by a month to November 2019, and its terms of reference (ToR) were expanded by the Union Cabinet and asked it to consider whether "adequate, secure and non-lapsable" funds could be provided for funding defence and internal security, and how would a distinct system to fund defence and internal security be operationalised. It was dissolved on 26 November 2023.

=== Members ===
Profile of members of the Fifteenth Finance Commission
S. no.	Name	Portrait	Designation	Background in finance and economics
1	Nand Kishore Singh		Chairman	Retired Indian Administrative Service (IAS) officer. Served as Union Revenue Secretary, Union Economic Affairs Secretary and Union Expenditure Secretary. Also served as a member of the erstwhile Planning Commission. Post-retirement, served as a member of the Parliament in the Rajya Sabha (Council of the States) for the state of Bihar. He has been a senior member of the Bharatiya Janata Party since March 2014.
2	Prof. (Dr.) Anoop Singh		Member	An adjunct professor at Georgetown University, Washington, D.C. Also served as the International Monetary Fund's director of its Regional Office of Asia and the Pacific.
3	Dr. Ashok Lahiri (Note: Lahiri served as a part-time of the commission from November 2017 to May 2018, before being elevated to the status of a full-time member.)		Member	Former Chief Economic Adviser to the Government of India, director of the National Institute of Public Finance and Policy, executive director at the Asian Development Bank, reader at the Delhi School of Economics at the University of Delhi, and the chairperson of Bandhan Bank.
4	Ajay Narayan Jha		Member	Retired IAS. Served as the Union Finance Secretary and Union Expenditure Secretary. He was appointed member of the commission in lieu of Das.
5	Prof.Dr. Ramesh Chand		Member (part-time)	A member of the NITI Aayog, a fellow of National Academy of Agricultural Sciences and Indian Society of Agricultural Economics. Also served as the director of the National Institute of Agricultural Economics and Policy Research.

== Extensions ==
The commission was to submit its Report on the basis of its Terms of Reference (ToR) by 30 October 2019 covering a period of five years commencing from 1 April 2020.

In July 2019, The Union Cabinet chaired by Prime Minister Narendra Modi approved the extension of the term of Fifteenth Finance Commission up to 30 November 2019 to enable the commission to examine various comparable estimates for financial projections in view of reforms and the new realities to finalise its recommendations for the period 2020–2025, after taking into consideration, its constitution in the backdrop of various major fiscal/budgetary reforms introduced by the Union Government in the past four years like closure of the Planning Commission and its replacement by NITl Aayog, removal of distinction between Non-Plan and Plan expenditure, advancing the budget calendar by one month and passing of the full budget before commencement of the new financial year i.e. on 1 February, introduction of Goods and Services Tax (GST) from July 2017 and New FRBM architecture with debt and fiscal deficit path, and also the task of determining the expenditure and receipts of the Union and State governments based on which the Commission shall make its recommendations is time-consuming, as checks for data consistency across time and data sets become challenging.

In November 2019, the Cabinet approved the 15th Finance Commission to submit first report for the first fiscal year viz. 2020-21 and to extend the tenure of 15th Finance Commission to provide for the presentation of the final report covering FYs 2021–22 to 2025-26 by 30 October 2020. The statement by the government cited reasons such as, due to restrictions imposed by the model code of conduct, the commission completed its visit to states only recently, which had a bearing on the detailed assessments of states requirements, comprehensively examining their implications and aligning them to the requirements of the states and the central government will require additional time, and making a five-year coverage available for the commission beyond 1 April 2021, will help both state and central governments design schemes with medium- to long-term financial perspective and provide adequate time for mid-course evaluation and correction.

The first report, consisting of recommendations for the financial year 2020–21, was tabled in Parliament in February 2020.

On 9 November 2020, the Fifteenth Finance Commission (XVFC) led by Chairman Sh N K Singh, submitted its report for the period 2021–22 to 2025–26 to the Hon'ble President of India.

The final report with recommendations for the 2021-26 period was tabled in Parliament on 1 February 2021.

== Aims ==
The commission was set up to give recommendations for devolution of taxes and other fiscal matters for five fiscal years, commencing 1 April 2020. The main tasks of the commission were to "strengthen cooperative federalism, improve the quality of public spending and help protect fiscal stability". Some newspapers like The Hindu and The Economic Times noted that commission's job was made harder because of the roll-out of goods and service tax (GST) regime in India, as, it had taken certain powers concerning taxation away from the union and the states, and, had given them to the newly formed GST Council. The peer-reviewed journal, Economic and Political Weekly, further noted that even after the passage of the Fiscal Responsibility and Budget Management Act, 2003, some states still incur revenue deficits, so, the commission would have to either recommend the disbandment of revenue deficit grants, or, would have to recommend ways for further fiscal consolidation.

The commission's chairman, N. K. Singh, said that the commission would need to define populism, as, the commission's terms of reference (ToR) had a provision for rewarding states which were successful in eliminating or reducing expenditure incurred on populist schemes. Singh added that the commission would need to reappraise the formula of devolution of revenue through the union's taxes, because of a provision in its ToR. Singh further said, in a lecture to Indian Institute of Management Ahmedabad students, that one of the commission's challenges was to find a balance between equity and efficiency, adding that urban and rural local bodies—the constitutionally-mandated third-tier of government in India—needed to be further empowered to stimulate added economic growth.

Chief Economic Adviser to the Government of India, Arvind Subramanian, said that the commission may need to function like the first finance commission because of an increased decentralisation and change in India; further suggesting to divide the tax devolution system into four pots – "return", "redistribution", "risk sharing" and "reward", while also saying that tax devolution was no more a north–south issue. However, Subramanian's ideas were opposed by Pinaki Chakraborty, a professor at the National Institute of Public Finance and Policy, and a member of the Fifteenth Finance Commission's advisory council, who said that having a division of tax devolution into four pots would violate "the objective of offsetting revenue disabilities."

The commission's chairperson, N. K. Singh, said in April 2019 that there should be mechanisms through which the Finance Commissions and the GST Council could coordinate to "ensure there are multiplier benefits of a higher growth trajectory".

== Demands ==
At its first interaction with members of parliament (MPs), the commission was asked by some MPs to recommend a plan on compensating states which suffered revenue losses after the roll-out of GST. Some parliamentarians also asked the commission to reassess the criteria of classifying a state as 'backwards'.

The president of Nationalist Congress Party, Sharad Pawar, suggested the commission to create a financial buffer against oil prices. Whereas, the chief minister of Bihar and Janata Dal (United) president and convener, Nitish Kumar—in a letter to the commission's chairman, N. K. Singh—asked the commission to revisit the criterion of the target of a maximum 3% fiscal deficit under the Fiscal Responsibility and Budget Management Act, 2003, calling it "iniquitous". Singh added, that the state was still waiting for special financial allocations promised to it under the Bihar Reorganisation Act, 2000.

The commission, on its visit to the state, was asked by the Government of West Bengal to look into restructuring the state's debt, so that it does not become "a permanent drag on the economy of Bengal"; the state's chief minister and All India Trinamool Congress chairperson, convener and president, Mamata Banerjee, said in a press conference, that "we expect that Finance Commission will consider our demand for debt restructuring or waiver". West Bengal government further suggested an alternative devolution formula based on factors like social backwardness, locational complexities and continuation of revenue deficits to the commission.

The commission was asked by several state governments to increase states' share in union's tax devolution from the existing 42 per cent to 50 per cent. Whereas, the Government of India asked the commission to review a 10 per cent hike from 32 per cent to 42 per cent in tax devolution given to states by the Fourteenth Finance Commission, with Union Minister of Finance, Arun Jaitley, saying that "India is a Union of states, the Union also has to survive".

== Working ==
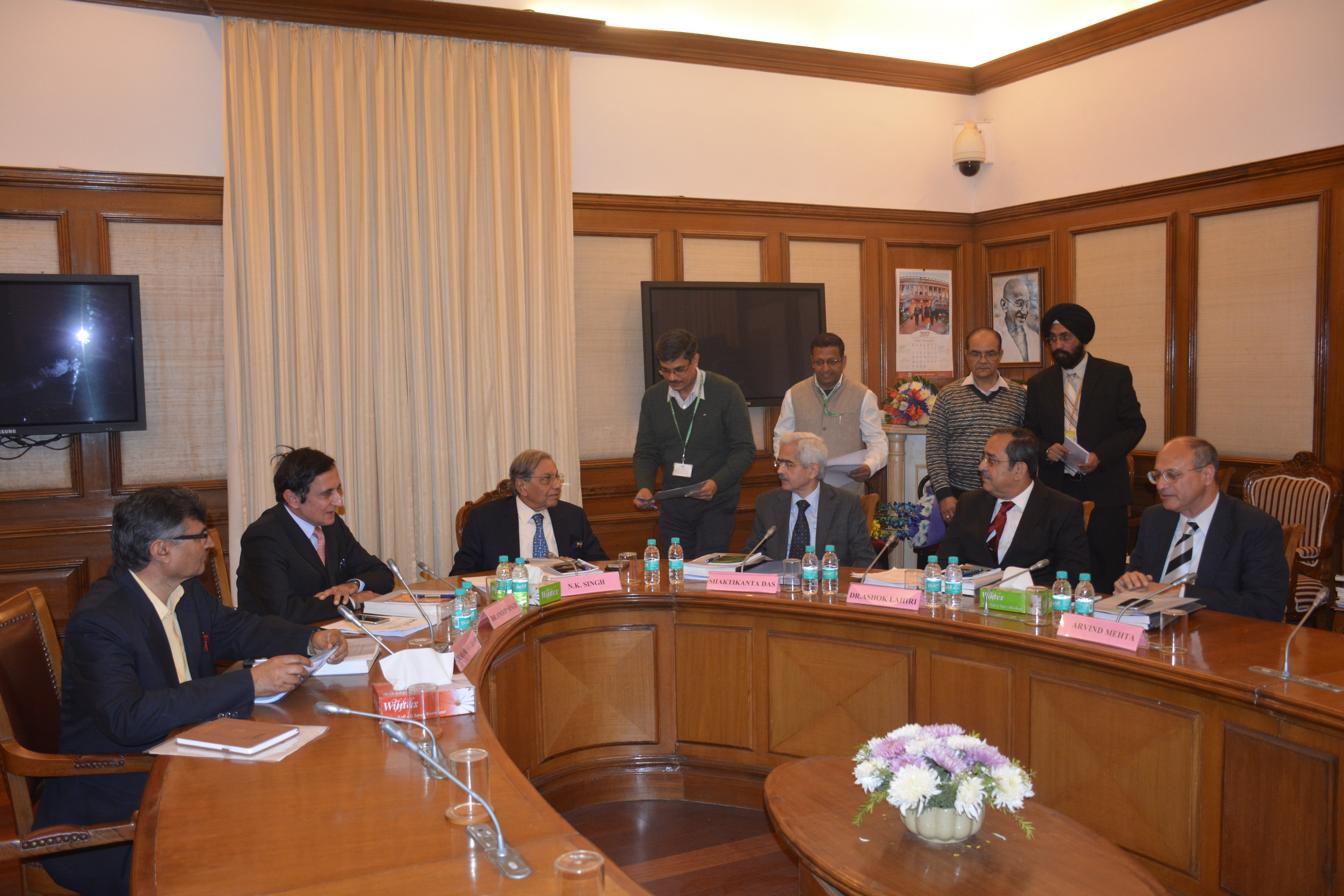
A meeting of the Fifteenth Finance Commission, attended by its chairperson, members, secretary and other staffers; c. 2017

The commission visited several states, and held meetings with senior political and non-political state government officials of different states; most states also generally submitted a memorandum to the commission outlining their needs and demands to the panel. It also met with representatives of the industry and bankers. Das acted as chairman of the commission in state visits without Singh. The commission further met with the representatives of various federal government agencies, including the vice-chairman and chief executive officer of its quasi-autonomous policy think-tank, the NITI Aayog, Rajiv Kumar and Amitabh Kant respectively.

The commission was headquartered in New Delhi at the Jawahar Vyapar Bhawan on Tolstoy Marg and its offices were provided security cover by the Central Industrial Security Force.

In July 2019, the commission's term was extended by a month to November 2019, and its terms of reference (ToR) were expanded by the Union Cabinet and asked it to consider whether "adequate, secure and non-lapsable" funds could be provided for funding defence and internal security, and how would a distinct system to fund defence and internal security be operationalised.

=== Advisory bodies ===
==== Advisory council ====
The commission constituted an advisory council "to advise it on matters related to its terms of reference". The council consisted of president of Forum for Strategic Initiatives and former Chief Economic Adviser to the Government of India, Arvind Virmani; Oxus Research and Investments chairman and a part-time member of the Prime Minister's Economic Advisory Council, Surjit Bhattal; a former deputy director in the IMF, Sanjeev Gupta; a professor at the National Institute of Public Finance and Policy, Pinaki Chakraborty; JP Morgan chief India economist, Sajjid Chinoy; and a managing director and India economist and strategist at Credit Suisse, Neelkanth Mishra.

Chief Economic Adviser to the Government of India, Krishnamurthy Subramanian, was inducted as a member of the advisory council in May 2019.

==== High-level group ====
High-level advisory group on health-related issues

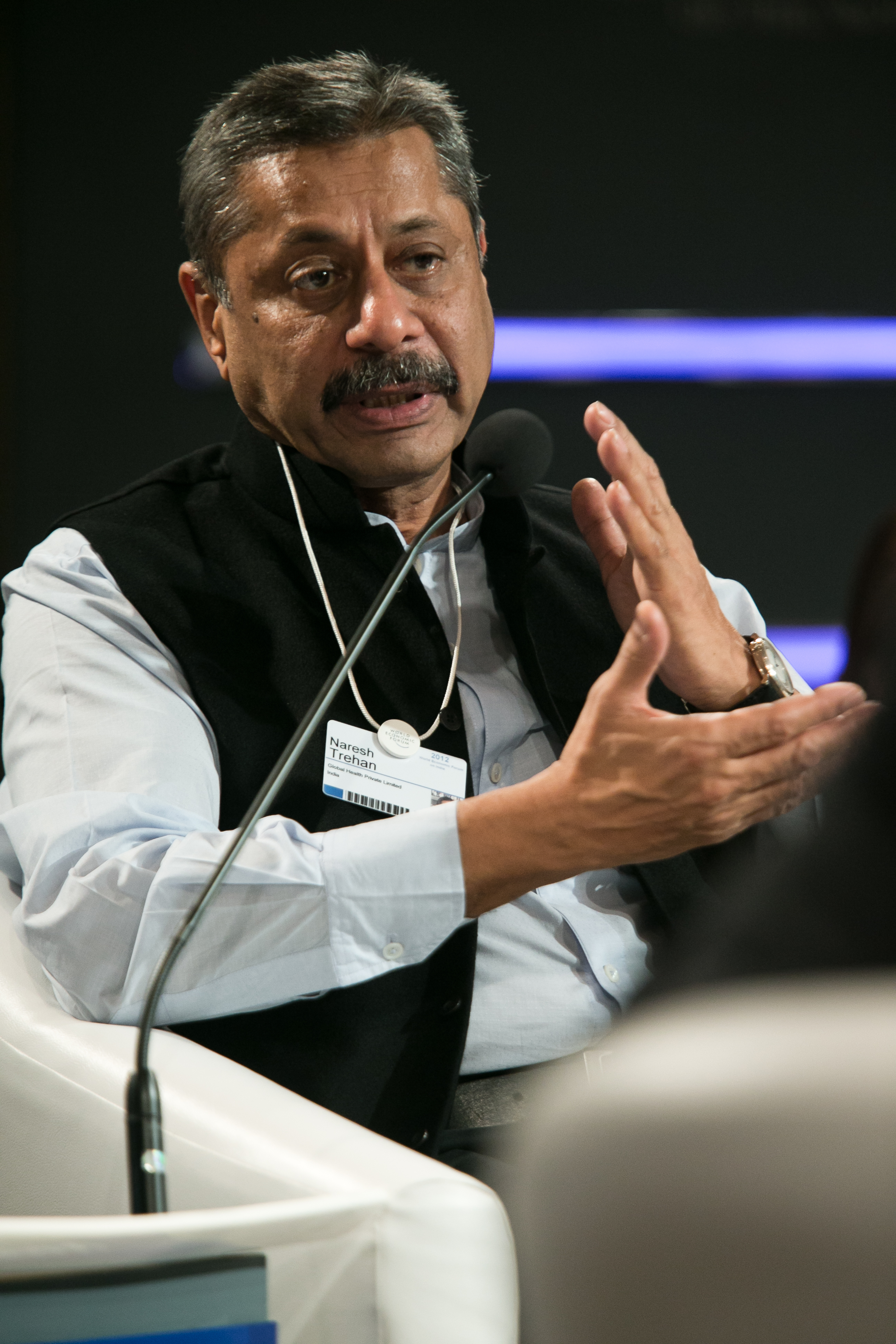
Naresh Trehan

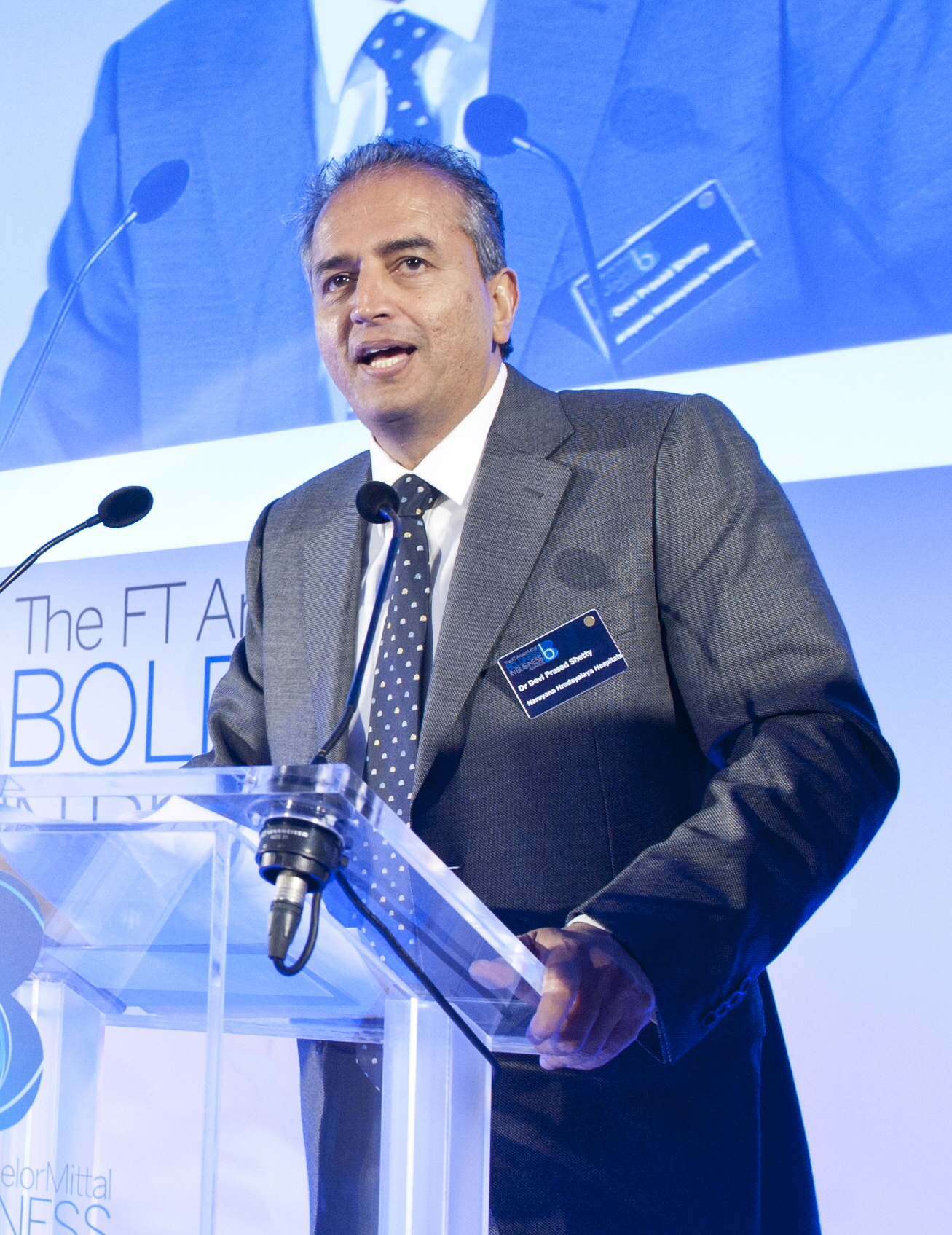
Devi Shetty

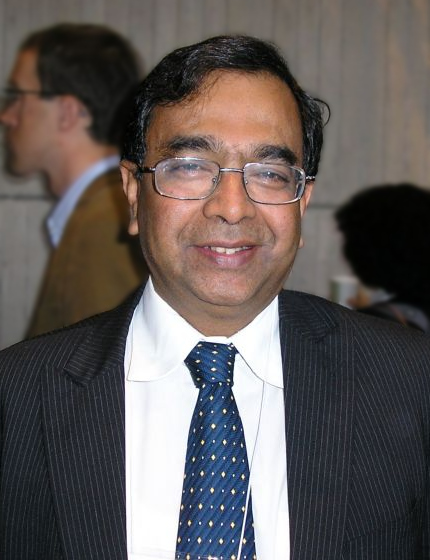
K. Srinath Reddy

Further, the commission also constituted a high-level group to inter alia advise it on "ways and means to" make effective use of the "existing financial resources and to" encourage "the state governments' effort on" fulfilling "well-defined health parameters in India". The group comprised All India Institute of Medical Sciences, New Delhi director, Randeep Guleria as its convener and Narayana Health City chairman, Devi Shetty; Maharashtra University of Health Sciences vice-chancellor, Deelip Govind Mhaisekar; chairman, managing director and chief cardiac surgeon of Medanta Health City, Naresh Trehan; professor and head of department of cardiothoracic surgery at R. G. Kar Medical College and Hospital, Bhabatosh Biswas; and president of Public Health Foundation of India, K. Srinath Reddy as its members.

== Criticism ==
=== South India penalised for population control ===
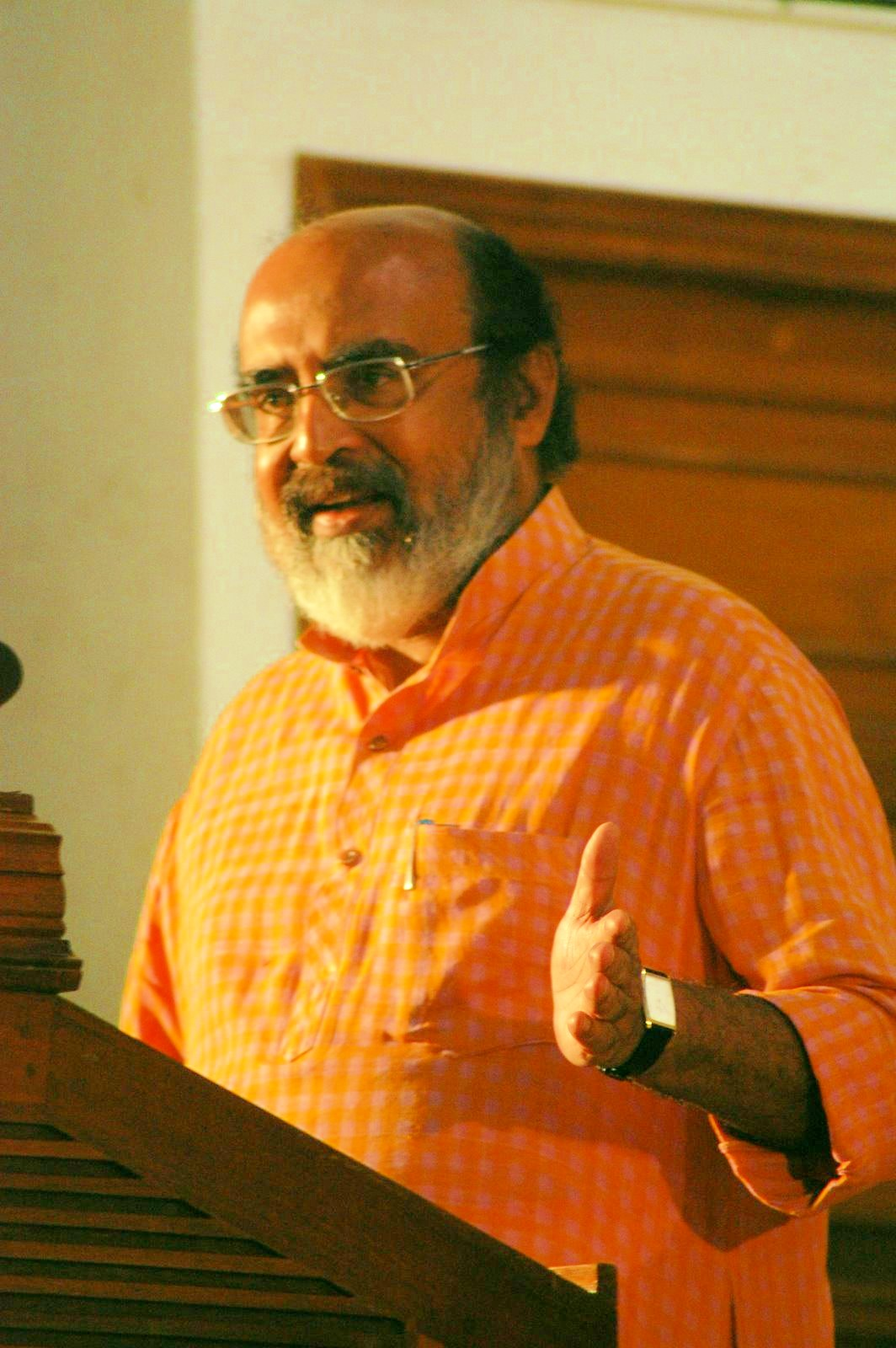
Finance minister of Kerala, T. M. Thomas Isaac was a major opponent of the Fifteenth Finance Commission's terms of reference

Politicians—including chief ministers and finance ministers—; retired civil servants; judges; and economists from South Indian states opposed the commission's terms of reference, as, it used the data of 2011 census, instead of the data of 1971 census, as previous commissions had. South Indian states believes that this would dilute the share of South India in the pool of union's tax revenue, because of its progressive measure in population control vis-à-vis the north since 1971. Kerala finance minister, T. M. Thomas Issac, proposed a meeting of finance ministers of the ten states and union territories to discuss the commission's ToR. In response, Subhash Chandra Garg, Union Economic Affairs Secretary, said that the terms of reference were balanced and were "not one way or the other", adding that according to the second provision of the ToR, states with a good total fertility rate—especially, the ones which had reached the replacement rate (2.1 children per woman)—would be incentivised. Garg's views were reiterated by the nation's finance minister and Bharatiya Janata Party (BJP) Rajya Sabha leader, Arun Jaitley, who—in a Facebook post—said that the row over the commission's terms of reference was "needless" and could not have been "further from the truth". Prime minister and BJP Lok Sabha leader, Narendra Modi, said that vested interests were behind the allegations that the commission's terms of reference being biased against certain states and union territories and called such allegations "baseless".

Finance ministers of the states of Karnataka, Kerala and Andhra Pradesh and the finance minister of the Union Territory of Puducherry met at a conclave in Kerala's capital, Thiruvananthapuram, in April 2018 and collectively denounced the commission's terms of reference, calling them to be in contradiction with the principles of federalism. Five state and two union territory finance ministers met in Andhra Pradesh's capital, Amaravati, and drafted a memorandum to the president, Ram Nath Kovind, seeking changes in the commission's terms of reference. The group of finance ministers eventually met the president on 2018-05-17.

In July 2018, the vice president, Venkaiah Naidu—in his capacity as the chairman of Rajya Sabha—asked the commission's chairman, N. K. Singh, if certain states would be penalised with the use of 2011 census and was ensured by Singh that performing and progressive states would not be penalised by the commission.

=== Classification of Delhi ===
Aam Aadmi Party (AAP) convener and the chief minister of Delhi, Arvind Kejriwal, criticised the commission for treating the National Capital Territory of Delhi neither as a state nor as a union territory (UT), saying that the Delhi government deserved a ₹52,000 crore (equivalent to ₹760 billion or US$8.1 billion in 2026) grant from the union government if it qualified as a UT in the commission's eyes, else it deserved more devolution of union government's tax revenue as a state. Kejriwal added that the Government of Delhi would move to the Supreme Court of India on the matter. AAP national executive and political affairs committee member and Delhi deputy chief minister and finance minister, Manish Sisodia said that the terms of reference of the commission were "unfair"; Sisodia was a part of the group of state and union territory finance ministers who met with the president. In addition, AAP national joint secretary, Akshay Marathe said—citing Central Board of Direct Taxes figures—that the National Capital Territory of Delhi contributed as much as ₹1.08 lakh crore (equivalent to ₹1.7 trillion or US$18 billion in 2026)—or 13 per cent—of the nation's direct tax revenue and got around ₹325 crore (equivalent to ₹497 crore or US$53 million in 2026) from the Government of India in return.

=== Others ===
Jammu and Kashmir finance minister, economist and Jammu and Kashmir Peoples Democratic Party member, Haseeb Drabu, said, in an editorial in Livemint commented that the commission's ToR were outdated, and needed to be redrafted "to make the 15th Finance Commission a "second generation" commission".
