= Ajay Narayan Jha =

Indian civil servant (born 1959)

- Ajaya Nārāyaṇa Jhā
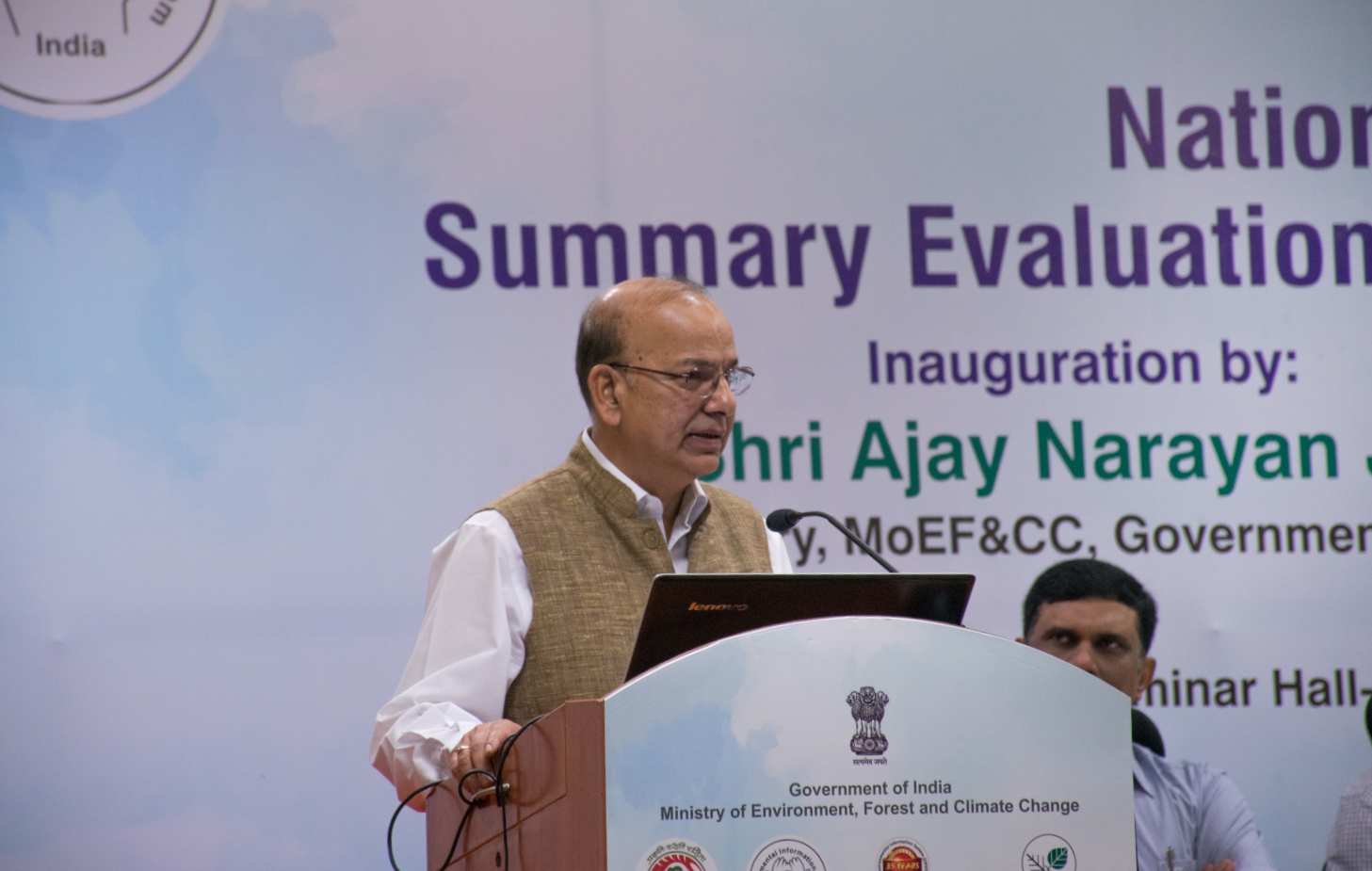
- Jha addressing an event at Gandhinagar, Gujarat in March 2017.

Member of the Sixteenth Finance Commission of India
- In office 1 January 2024 – 30 November 2025
- Appointed by: Appointments Committee of the Cabinet
- Preceded by: Position established
- Succeeded by: T.Rabi Sankar

Member of the Fifteenth Finance Commission of India
- In office 4 March 2019 – 26 November 2023
- Appointed by: Appointments Committee of the Cabinet
- Preceded by: Shaktikanta Das

Finance Secretary of India
- In office 4 December 2018 – 28 February 2019
- Appointed by: Appointments Committee of the Cabinet
- Minister: Arun Jaitley
- Preceded by: Hasmukh Adhia
- Succeeded by: Subhash Chandra Garg

Expenditure Secretary of India
- In office 31 October 2017 – 28 February 2019
- Appointed by: Appointments Committee of the Cabinet
- Prime Minister: Narendra Modi
- Minister: Arun Jaitley
- Preceded by: Ashok Lavasa
- Succeeded by: G. C. Murmu

Environment, Forests and Climate Change Secretary of India
- In office 1 May 2016 – 10 October 2017
- Appointed by: Appointments Committee of the Cabinet
- Prime Minister: Narendra Modi
- Minister: Anil Madhav Dave (2016—2017); Dr. Harsh Varhan (2017)
- Preceded by: Ashok Lavasa
- Succeeded by: C. K. Mishra

Personal details
- Born: Ajay Narayan Jha; 15 January 1959 (age 67) Bihar, India
- Education: Harvard Kennedy School; McGill University; St. Stephen's College, Delhi University
- Occupation: Civil servant
- Profession: IAS officer

Ajay Narayan Jha (born 15 January 1959; IAST: Ajaya Nārāyaṇa Jhā) is a 1982 batch Indian Administrative Service (IAS) officer of Manipur cadre. He was the Finance Secretary of India for three months. He was appointed as the member of Fifteenth Finance Commission of India in place of Shaktikanta Das and served there till 26 November 2023. Thereafter, he was appointed as a member of Sixteenth Finance Commission on 1 January 2024 and served their till 15 April 2025.

== Education ==
Jha has BA (Honours) and MA in history from St. Stephen's College at University of Delhi, a postgraduate degree in executive development from Harvard Kennedy School at Harvard University, and a certificate in French.

== Career ==
Jha has served in various key positions for both the Government of India and the Government of Manipur, like as Principal Secretary (Finance), Principal Secretary (Environment and Forests), chairman of Manipur Renewable Energy Development Agency (MREDA), principal secretary to the Chief Minister of Manipur, secretary to the Governor of Manipur, and as the deputy commissioner and district magistrate of Ukhrul and Churachandpur districts in the Manipur government, and as Union Expenditure Secretary, Union Environment, Forests and Climate Change Secretary, special secretary in Department of Expenditure of the Ministry of Finance, joint secretary and financial adviser in Department of Higher Education of the Ministry of Human Resources Development, and as joint secretary and financial adviser in Ministry of Law and Justice.

Jha also served as consultant to United Nations Economic and Social Commission for Asia and the Pacific (UNESCAP). In addition, Jha served as the secretary of Fourteenth Finance Commission, a deputy election commissioner in the Election Commission of India, and as Joint Secretary (Administration) in the Indira Gandhi National Centre for the Arts, on deputation, under rule 6(2)(ii) of the Indian Administrative Service (Cadre) Rules, 1956.

=== Environment, Forests and Climate Change Secretary ===
Jha was appointed as the Union Environment, Forests and Climate Change Secretary by the Appointments Committee of the Cabinet (ACC) in April 2016, he assumed the office of secretary on 1 May 2016, and demitted it on 10 October 2017.

=== Expenditure Secretary ===
Jha was appointed as the Union Expenditure Secretary by the Appointments Committee of the Cabinet (ACC) in October 2017, succeeding Ashok Lavasa, he was made officer on special duty (OSD), in the rank of secretary, till Lavasa's retirement. Jha assumed the office of secretary on 31 October 2017.

During his tenure as the Union Expenditure Secretary, Jha has been regarded as one of the most important people in the Ministry of Finance.
