= Sixteenth Finance Commission =

2023 finance commission of India

- १६वां वित्त आयोग
- State Emblem of India

Commission overview
- Preceding Commission: Fifteenth Finance Commission
- Superseding Commission: Seventeenth Finance Commission
- Jurisdiction: Whole of India
- Headquarters: 16th Finance Commission, Jawahar Vyapar Bhawan, Tolstoy Marg, New Delhi
- Minister responsible: Nirmala Sitharaman, Minister of Finance
- Commission executives: Arvind Panagariya, Chairman; Ajay Narayan Jha, Member; Annie George Mathew, Member; Manoj panda, Member; Soumya Kanti Ghosh, Part-Time Member; Ritvik Ranjanam Pandey, Secretary
- Parent department: Department of Economic Affairs, Ministry of Finance, Government of India
- Key documents: The Constitution of India (Article 280); The Finance Commission (Miscellaneous Provisions) Act, 1951 (Act no. 33 of 1951); S.O. 3755(E) (notification of formation of the commission)
- Website: fincomindia.nic.in

Sixteenth Finance Commission is the Finance Commission constituted by the Government of India under Article 280 of Constitution. Arvind Panagariya has been appointed as the Chief of the Commission with the main task of determining revenue sharing between the Central Government and State Governments for a period of five years from 1 April, 2026.

== History and objective ==
Sixteenth Finance Commission was formed under Article 280 of the constitution to determine the sharing of tax revenues between the Union Government of India and States for five year period starting from 1 April 2026. It determines the principles for granting of the aid from the Consolidated Fund of India to states and implementation of various measures for augmenting the resources of Consolidated Fund to meet the requirements of Panchayats and Municipalities of states.

== Members ==
The Sixteenth Finance Commission comprises a chairman and various members that are appointed by the president of India. It also consists of one secretary post. The composition is as follows:

=== Members ===
Profile of members of the Fifteenth Finance Commission
S. no.	Name	Portrait	Designation	Background in finance and economics
1	Arvind Panagariya		Chairman	Former vice-chairman of NITI Aayog
2	Ajay Narayan Jha		Member	Former member, 15th Finance Commission; former finance secretary, Government of India
3	Annie George Mathew		Member	Former special secretary, Department of Expenditure, Ministry of Finance, Government of India
4	Manoj Panda		Member	Former director, Institute of Economic Growth
5	Soumya Kanti Ghosh		Member (part-time)	Group chief economic advisor, State Bank of India
6	Ritvik Ranjanam Pandey		Secretary	Joint Secretary, Department of Revenue, Ministry of Finance, Government of India

== Tenure ==
The tenure of each finance commission is five years.

== See also ==
- Fifteenth Finance Commission
