= Hasmukh Adhia =

Indian banker and a civil servant

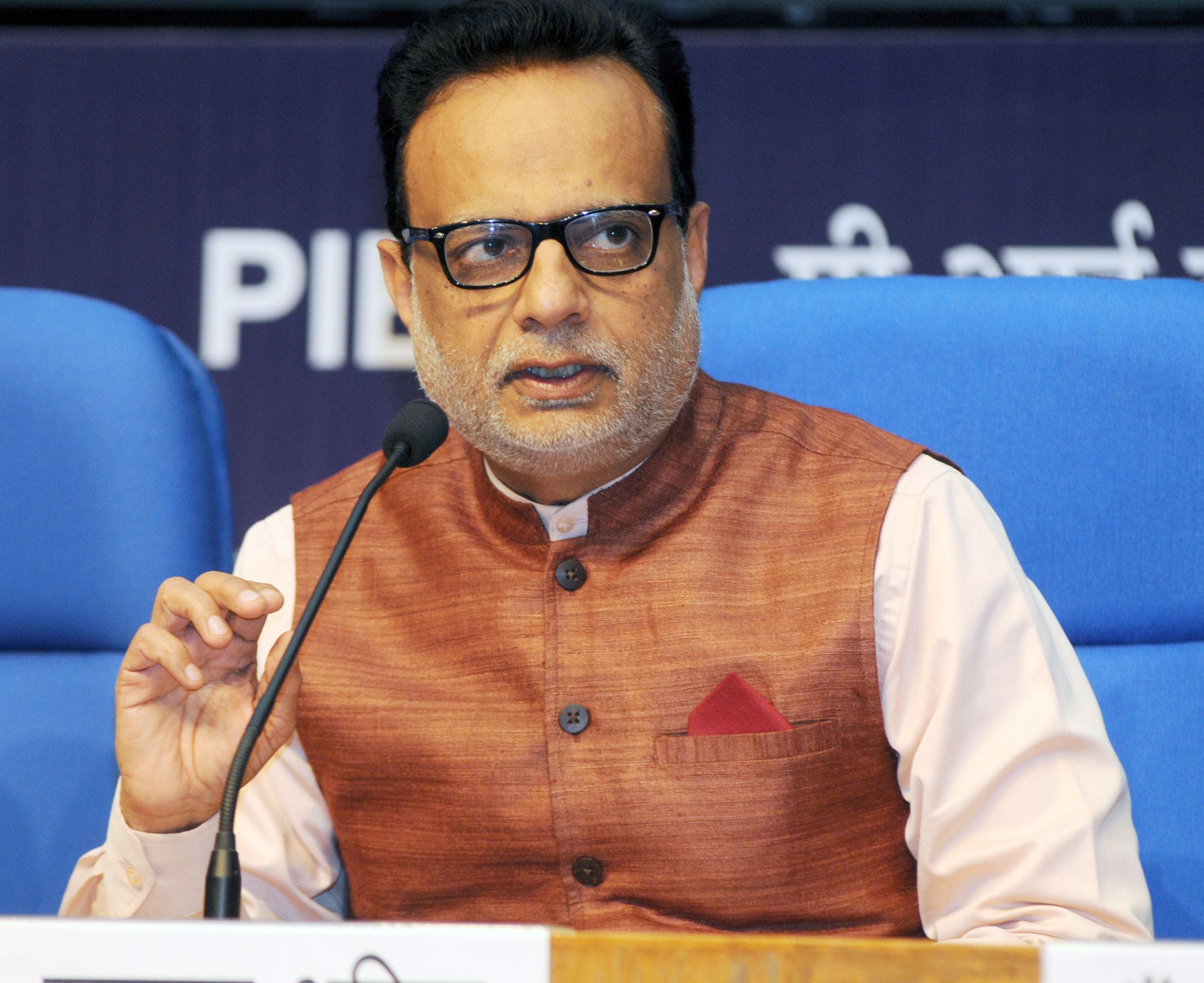

Chancellor of Central University of Gujarat & Chairman of Standing Committee of Pandit Deendayal Energy University
- Incumbent
- Assumed office 8 March 2019
- Preceded by: Yoginder K Alagh

Chairman of GIFT City
- In office 24 June 2022 – 15 February 2026
- Preceded by: Sudhir Mankad
- Succeeded by: Uday Kotak

Chairman of Bank of Baroda
- In office 1 March 2019 – 29 February 2024
- Appointed by: Appointments Committee of the Cabinet
- Preceded by: Ravi Venkatesan
- Succeeded by: MR Kumar

Finance Secretary of India
- In office 1 November 2017 – 30 November 2018
- Appointed by: Appointments Committee of the Cabinet
- Minister: Arun Jaitley
- Preceded by: Ashok Lavasa
- Succeeded by: Ajay Narayan Jha

Revenue Secretary of India
- In office 1 September 2015 – 30 November 2018
- Appointed by: Appointments Committee of the Cabinet
- Minister: Arun Jaitley
- Preceded by: Shaktikanta Das
- Succeeded by: Ajay Bhushan Pandey

Financial Services Secretary of India
- In office 3 November 2014 – 31 August 2015
- Preceded by: G S Sandhu
- Succeeded by: Anjuly Chib Duggal

Personal details
- Born: 3 November 1958 (age 67) Rajkot district, Gujarat
- Education: IIM Bangalore; Gujarat University; Swami Vivekanand Yoga University
- Occupation: Retired IAS officer

Hasmukh Adhia (born 3 November 1958) is a retired 1981 batch IAS officer of Gujarat cadre who served as the Finance Secretary and Revenue Secretary of India. He is considered as one of the key persons behind the architecture and roll-out of the Goods and Services Tax & Demonetization in India announced in 2016. He is the present Chairman of the boards of State public sector undertakings Gujarat Alkalies and Chemicals Limited (GACL) (GACL) and Gujarat Mineral Development Corporation Ltd(GMDC), standing committee of Pandit Deendayal Energy University, Gandhinagar and former Chairman of GIFT City, Non Executive Chairman of Bank of Baroda.

== Education ==
Hasmukh Adhia is a Doctor of Philosophy (PhD) in yoga from the Swami Vivekanand Yoga University in Bangalore, and is a gold medallist in one year post graduate programme in public management and Policy for Government and Non Government Executives (PGP-PMP) from Indian Institute of Management Bangalore. His thesis for PhD was on "Impact of Yoga on Management". He also has Master of Commerce and Bachelor Commerce degrees from Gujarat University.

== Career ==
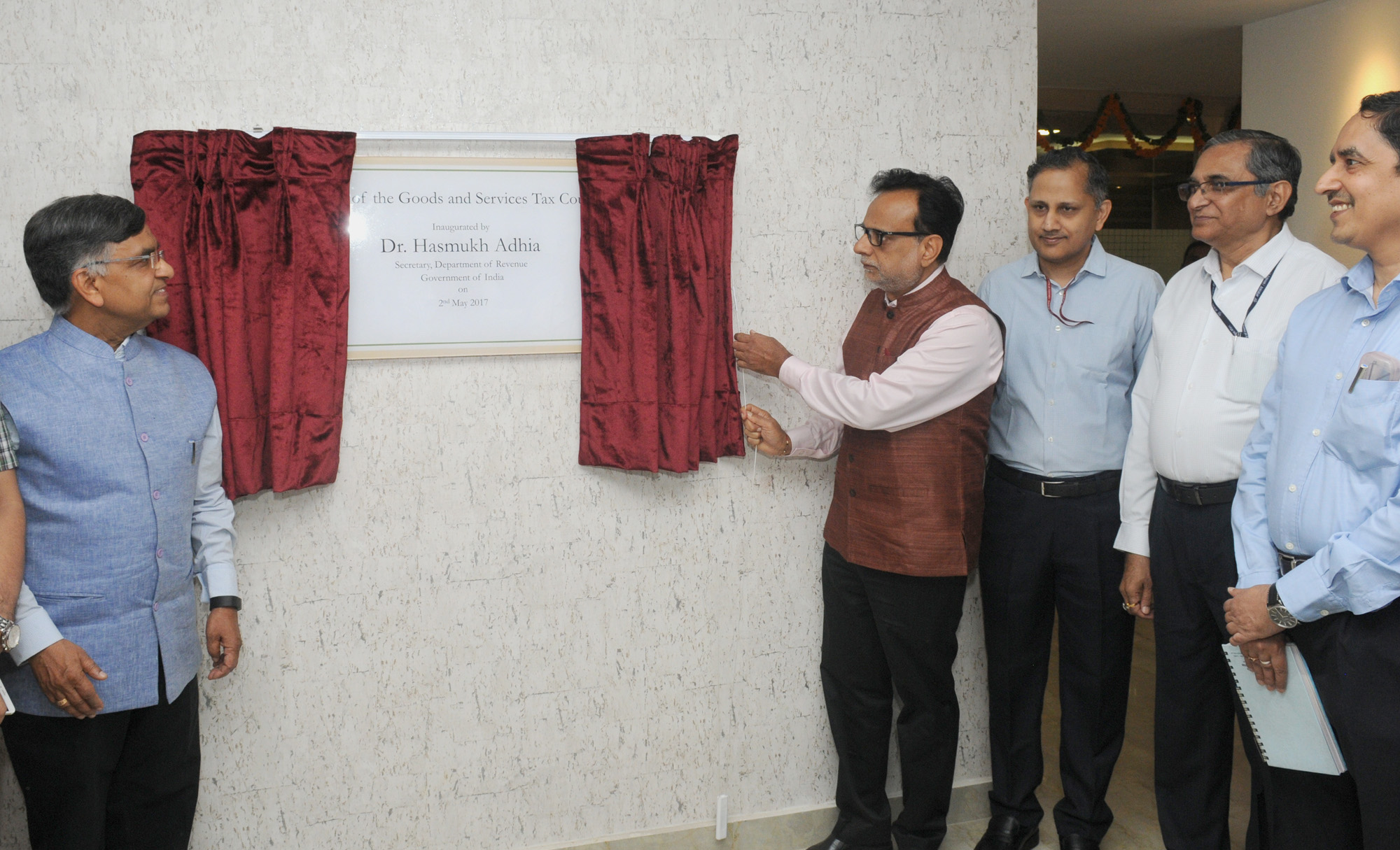
Adhia unveiling the plaque to inaugurate the new office of GST Council

Adhia has served in various positions for both the Government of Gujarat and the Government of India, like as Additional chief secretary (Finance), Principal Secretary (Education), Principal Secretary (Transport), Principal Secretary to Chief Minister of Gujarat, executive director of the Sardar Sarovar Narmada Nigam, managing director of the Gujarat Industrial Investment Corporation, and as the district magistrate and collector of Bhavnagar and Surat districts in the Gujarat government; and as Union Revenue Secretary and Union Financial Services Secretary, in the Indian government.

Adhia was also a consultant to the United Nations Industrial Development Organization.

=== Financial Services Secretary ===
Adhia was appointed as the Union Financial Services Secretary by the prime minister-headed Appointments Committee of the Cabinet (ACC) in November 2014, he assumed office on 3 November, and demitted it on 31 August 2015, when he was appointed the Union Revenue Secretary.

=== Revenue Secretary ===
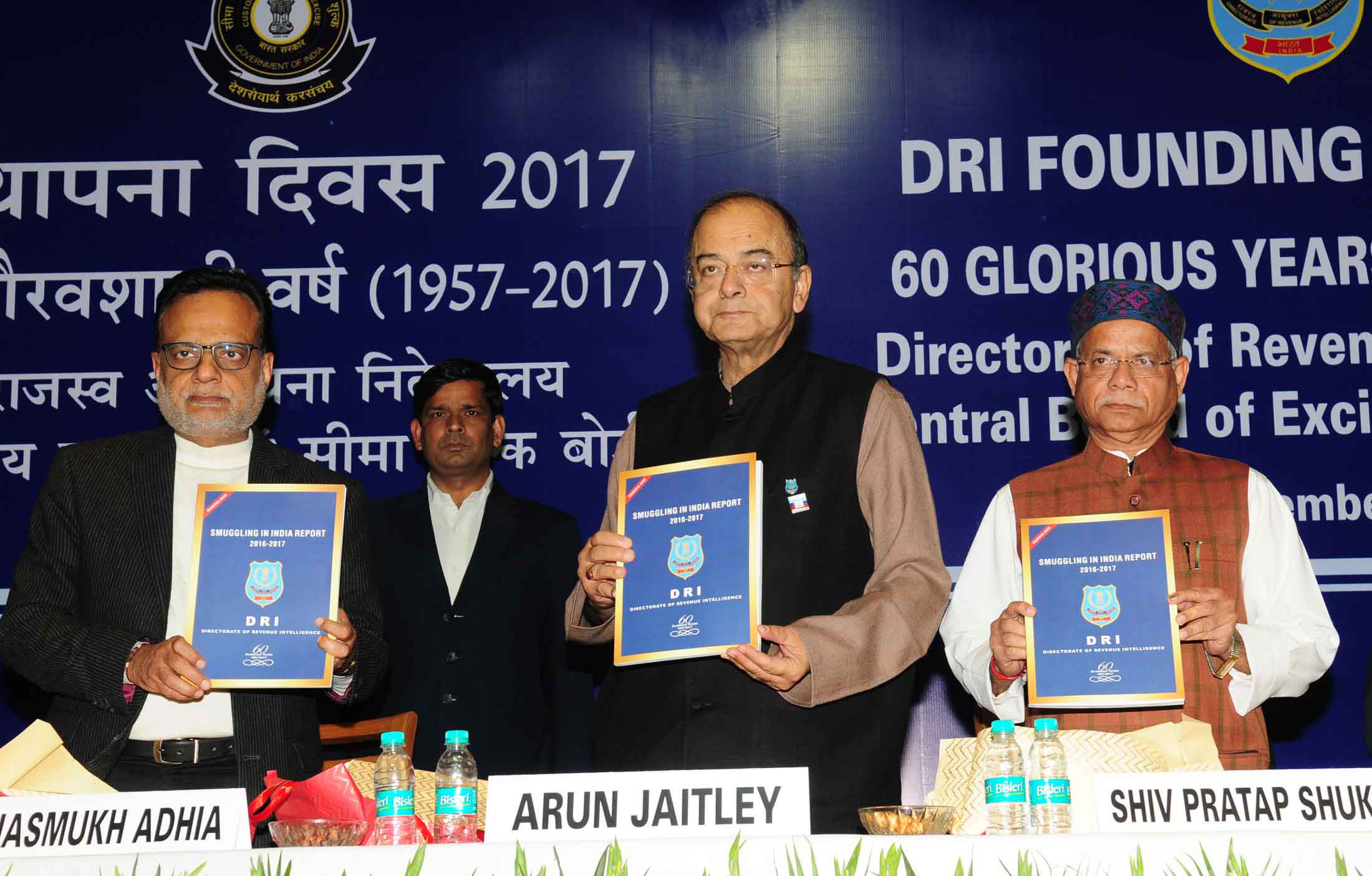
Adhia with Minister of Finance Arun Jaitley, Minister of State Shiv Pratap Shukla on the diamond jubilee celebrations of the foundation of the Directorate of Revenue Intelligence

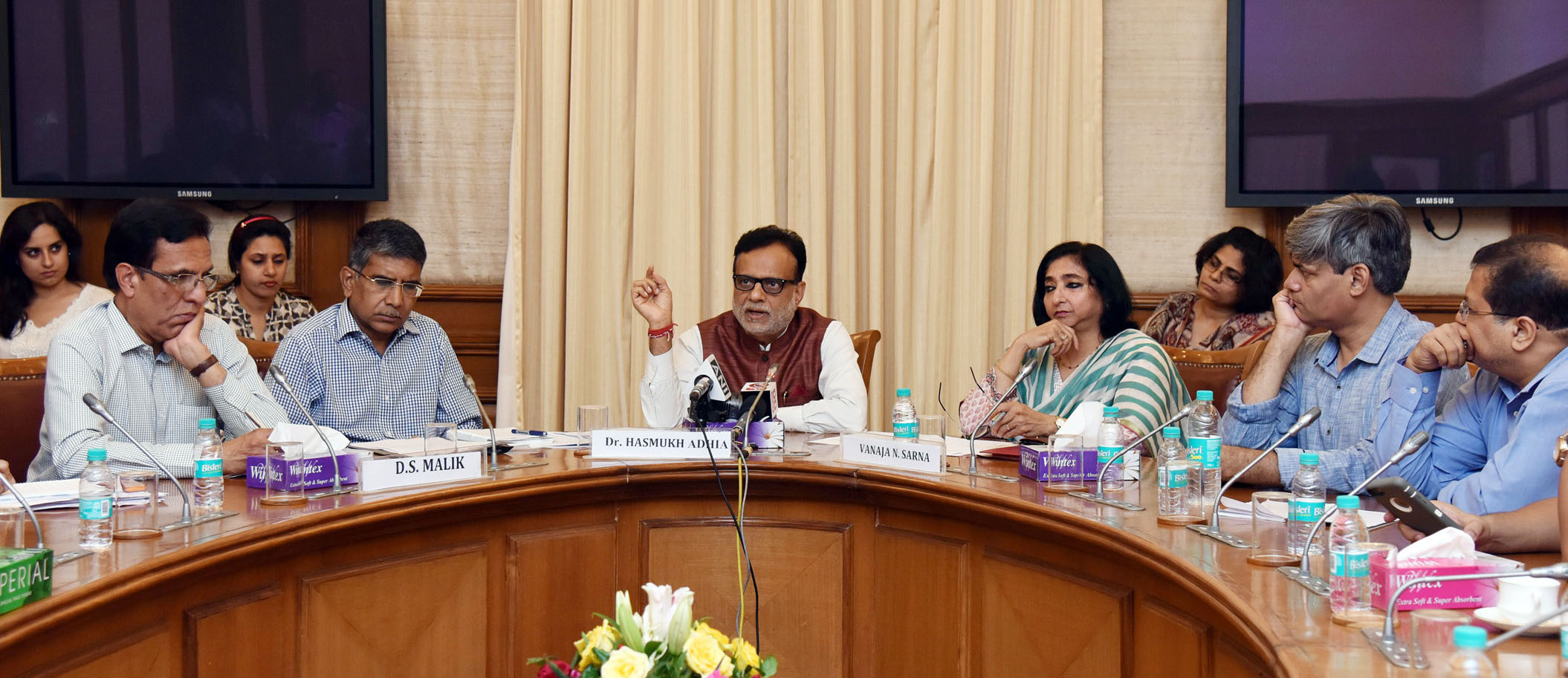
Adhia addressing a press conference on Goods and Service Tax

Adhia was appointed as the Union Revenue Secretary by the ACC in August 2015, he assumed office on 1 September 2015.

In September 2017, after the retirement of Ashok Lavasa, Adhia was designated as the Finance Secretary, as he became the senior-most secretary in the Ministry of Finance. Adhia retired from IAS and simultaneously demitted the offices of Finance Secretary and Revenue Secretary on 30 November 2018; he was succeeded as Revenue Secretary by Unique Identification Authority of India's chief executive officer Ajay Bhushan Pandey, and as Finance Secretary by Expenditure Secretary Ajay Narayan Jha, as the senior-most secretary in the Ministry of Finance.

Ahead of his retirement, Adhia was praised by Minister of Finance Arun Jaitley, who called him "highly competent, disciplined, no-nonsense civil servant [...] with impeccable integrity," and said that Adhia refused important post-retirement assignment from the government and instead intended to focus on spirituality and caring for his son.

During his tenure as Revenue Secretary, Adhia was regarded as one of the most powerful bureaucrats in India.

== Controversies ==
Adhia is considered one of the key persons behind the architecture and roll-out of the controversial Goods and Service Tax in India. He is also considered to be privy to another major controversial move of demonetisation of Rs 500 and Rs. 1000 Currency notes which forced the retirement of 86 per cent of cash in circulation in India on 8 November 2016.

He was also accused of diluting graft charges against congress leader like Sonia Gandhi, P.Chidambaram. Hasmukh Adhia was accused of interfering and preventing promotion of Enforcement Directorate Joint Director Rajeshwar Singh. BJP Leader Subramaniam Swamy filed a petition in Supreme Court in favour of Rajeshwar Singh.

Hasmukh Adhia was considered to be one of the key persons in bringing controversial LTCG tax for Stocks without any indexation benefits. This move was considered to be illogical and became largely unpopular in Indian Stock Market. This triggered Foreign Investors to pull out investment from Indian Stock Market and triggered a Market Crash on 2 February 2018, a day after the announcement was made.

Hasmukh Adhia along with Indian Finance minister Arun Jaitley became highly unpopular after piling up taxes and cess on Indian Salaried Class instead of raising the tax slab. There was an outrage among salaried class when he was quoted saying "Why shouldn’t we tax a class that is investing in markets".

== Books ==
- Adhia, Hasmukh (2007). Reinventing Government through HRM Strategies. Hyderabad: ICFAI University Press (published 5 October 2007). ISBN 978-8131412503.
- Adhia, Hasmukh (2008). My Notes to Myself: Simple tips on human resource management taken from the diary of a bureaucrat (in English and Gujarati). Hyderabad: ICFAI University Press (published 28 March 2008). ISBN 978-8131414217.
