= Subhash Chandra Garg =

Indian bureaucrat and former Finance Secretary of India

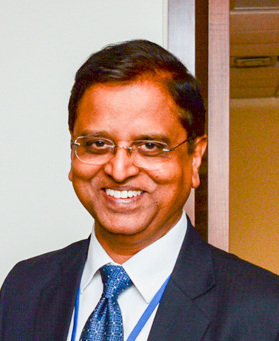

Power Secretary of India
- In office 26 July 2019 – 31 October 2019
- Preceded by: Ajay Kumar Bhalla
- Succeeded by: Sanjiv N. Sahai

Finance Secretary of India
- In office 1 March 2019 – 26 July 2019
- Preceded by: Ajay Narayan Jha
- Succeeded by: Rajiv Kumar

Economic Affairs Secretary of India
- In office 5 July 2017 – 26 July 2019
- Preceded by: Shaktikanta Das
- Succeeded by: Atanu Chakraborty

Executive director of the World Bank
- In office 10 September 2014 – 21 June 2017

Personal details
- Born: 16 October 1960 (age 65) Jaipur, Rajasthan, India
- Education: Institute of Cost Accountants of India; University of Rajasthan
- Occupation: IAS officer

Subhash Chandra Garg (born 16 October 1960) is a retired IAS officer from the 1983 batch of Rajasthan cadre who served as the Economic Affairs Secretary, Finance Secretary and Power Secretary of India.

== Education ==
Garg has graduate degrees in Law (LLB) and Commerce (BCom) from Rajasthan University from Government College, Ajmer. Garg is a professionally qualified Cost & Management Accountant from Institute of Cost Accountants of India. In addition, Garg is a qualified Company Secretary and received gold medal in 1990.

== Career ==
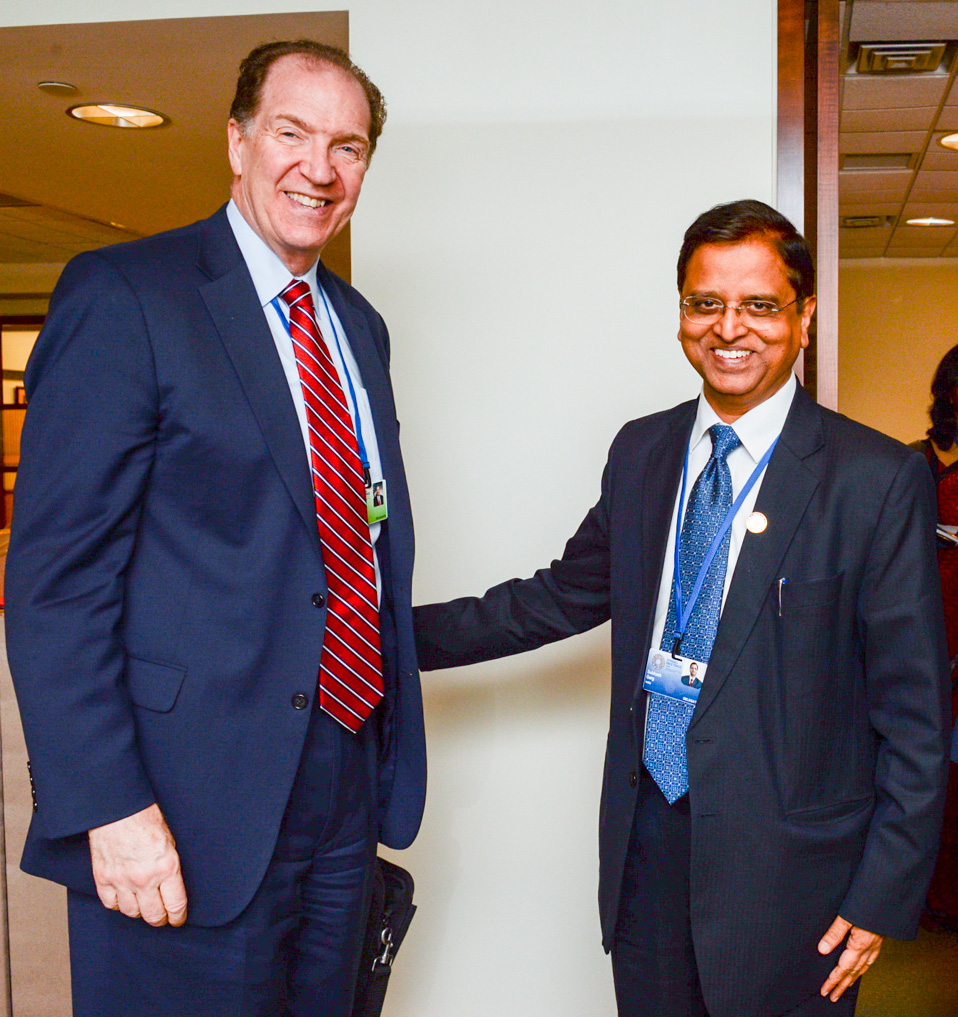
Subhash Garg with Under Secretary of the Treasury for International Affairs David Malpass in Washington, D.C. in 2018.

Garg has served in various key positions for both the Union Government and the Government of Rajasthan, like as Principal Secretary (Finance), Commissioner (Investment and NRIs) Secretary (Budget), Secretary (Expenditure), managing director of Rajasthan State Road Transport Corporation (RSRTC), managing director of Rajasthan State Seeds Corporation (RSSCL), Special Secretary (Mines and Energy) and Chief Executive and Director of Rajasthan Energy Development Corporation (REDC), Registrar of University of Rajasthan, and as the District Magistrate and Collector of Rajsamand district in the Government of Rajasthan, and as the Union Economic Affairs Secretary, Additional Secretary in the Cabinet Secretariat, Joint Secretary in the Department of Agriculture and Cooperation in the Ministry of Agriculture and Farmers Welfare and

In addition, Garg had a stint with the National Institute of Public Finance and Policy, on deputation, as a Principal Consultant.

=== Executive director for Bangladesh, Bhutan, India and Sri Lanka in World Bank ===
Garg was appointed as an executive director in the World Bank by the Appointments Committee of the Cabinet (ACC) for a tenure of three years, Garg assumed the office of executive director on 10 September 2014, and demitted on 21 June 2017, because of his appointment as the Union Economic Affairs Secretary.

== Ministry of Finance ==
Gard has served as Joint Secretary to Government of India in the Department of Expenditure of Ministry of Finance for less than five months and also as a Secretary to the Department of Economic Affairs in the Ministry of Finance for about two years in the Union Government.

=== Economic affairs secretary ===
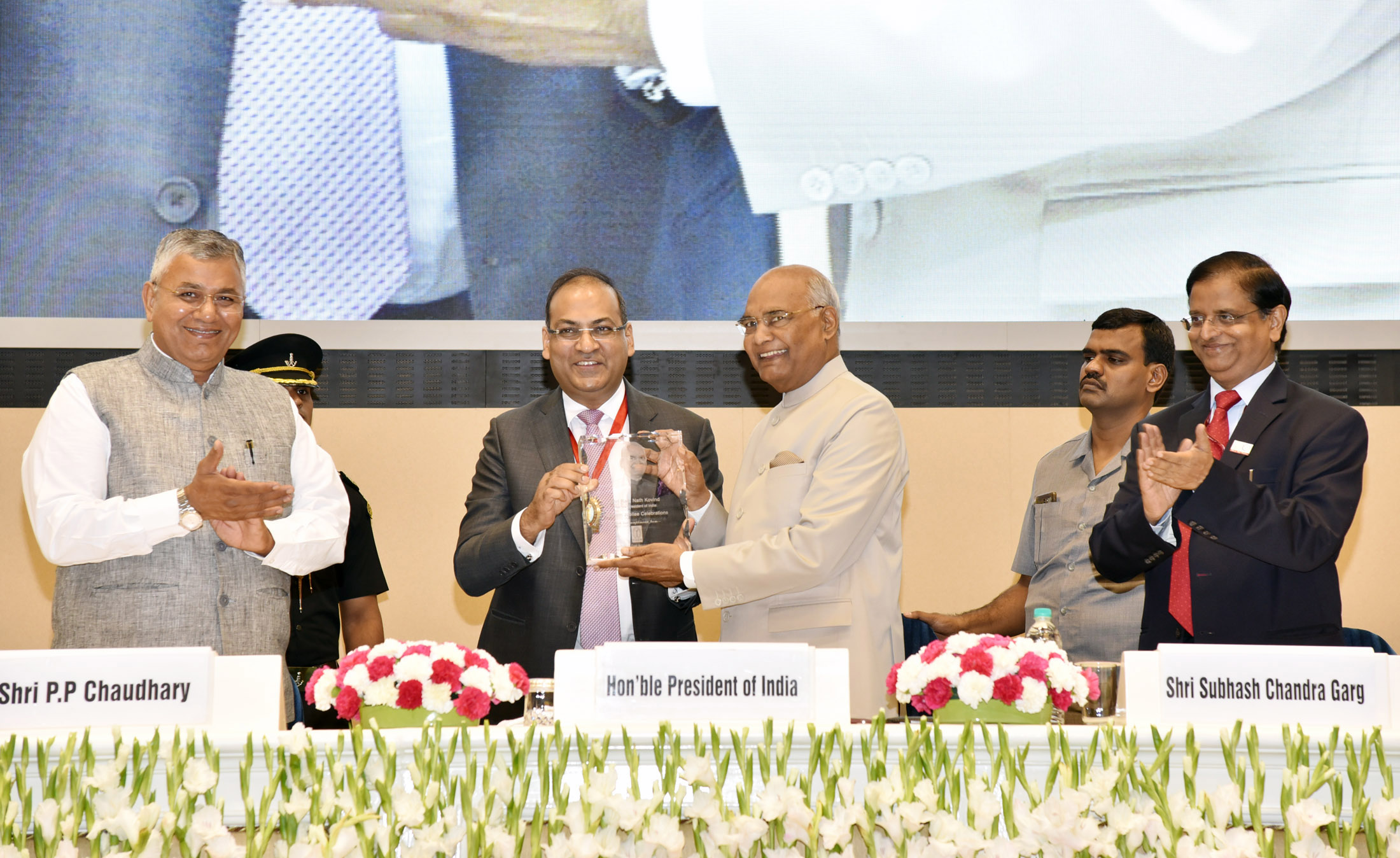
President of India Ram Kovind seen here with Garg at platinum jubilee celebrations at ICMAI in 2018.

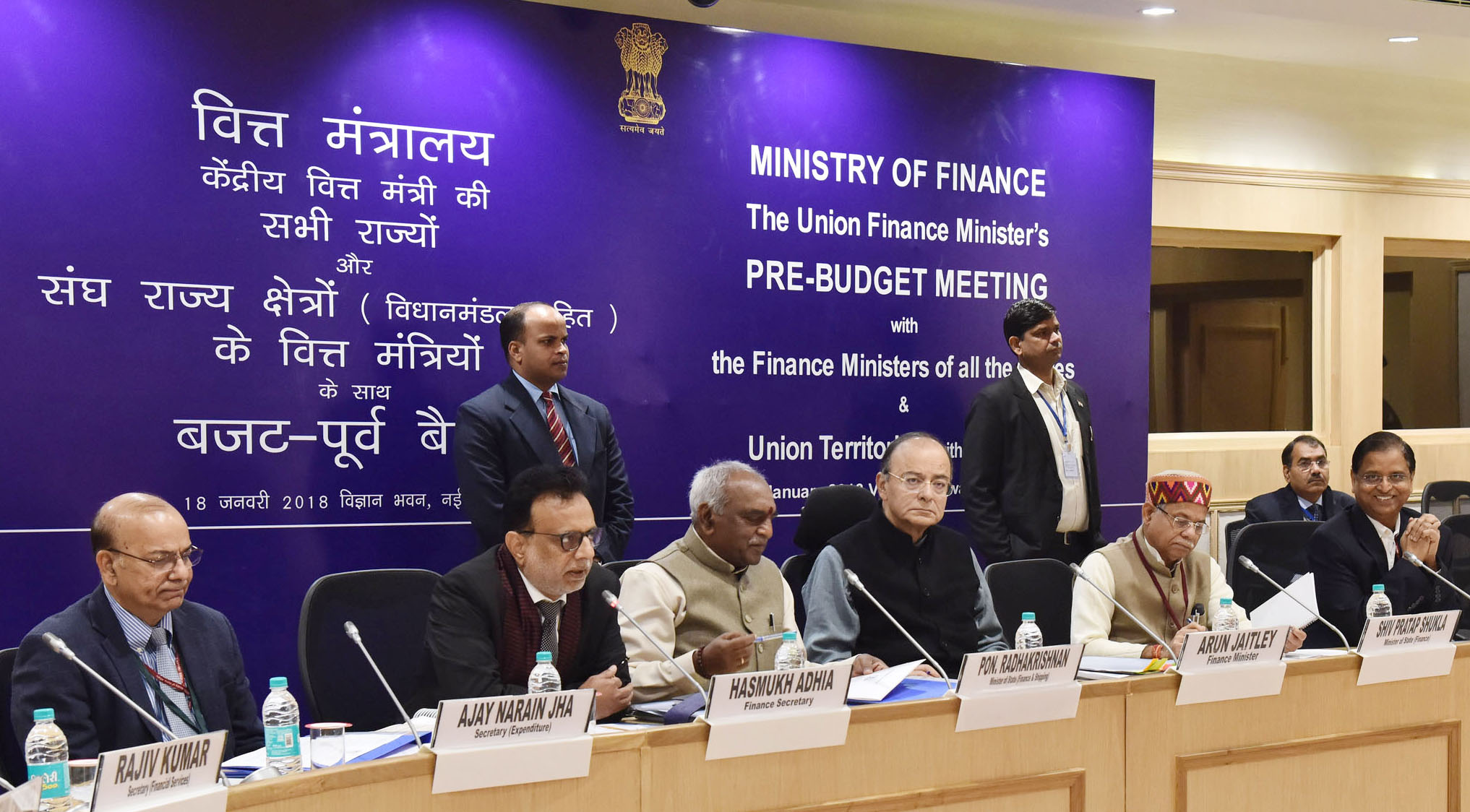
Union Minister for Finance and Corporate Affairs Arun Jaitley at Pre-Budget Consultation with the States Finance Ministers.

Garg was appointed as the Union Economic Affairs Secretary by the Appointments Committee of the Cabinet (ACC) in June 2017, he assumed the office of the Secretary on 12 July 2017 and served there till 26 July 2020.

=== Finance Secretary ===
The Finance Secretary is the administrative head of the Ministry of Finance.

Academic offices
Preceded by	Registrar of University of Rajasthan; September 1998-January 1999	Succeeded by
