= Ajay Bhushan Pandey =

Former Finance Secretary and CEO of UIDAI

Dr. Ajay Bhushan Pandey
- Ajaya Bhūṣaṇa Pāṇḍeya

Finance Secretary of India
- In office 3 March 2020 – 28 February 2021
- Appointed by: Appointments Committee of the Cabinet
- Minister: Nirmala Sitharaman
- Preceded by: Rajiv Kumar
- Succeeded by: T. V. Somanathan

Revenue Secretary of India
- In office 1 December 2018 – 28 February 2021
- Preceded by: Hasmukh Adhia
- Succeeded by: Tarun Bajaj

2nd Chairman of Goods and Service Tax Network
- In office 10 September 2017 – 28 February 2021
- Preceded by: Navin Kumar
- Succeeded by: Tarun Bajaj

1st Chief Executive Officer of Unique Identification Authority of India
- In office 31 May 2016 – 20 October 2019
- Preceded by: Position Established
- Succeeded by: Pankaj Kumar

Personal details
- Born: 2 February 1961 (age 65) Bihar, India
- Education: Indian Institute of Technology, Kanpur; University of Minnesota
- Occupation: IAS officer

Dr. Ajay Bhushan Pandey (born 2 February 1961; IAST: Ajaya Bhūṣaṇa Pāṇḍeya) is a 1984 batch Indian Administrative Service (IAS) officer belonging to the Maharashtra cadre. He is former Finance Secretary & Revenue Secretary of India (dual role). He was also the first chief executive officer (CEO) of the Unique Identification Authority of India (UIDAI), the nodal agency of Government of India responsible for implementing Aadhaar. He also worked as the chairman of Goods and Services Tax Network from September 2017 to March 2021. He also served as Chairman of National Financial Reporting Authority (NFRA) from March 2022 till March 2025. He also served as the Director General and CEO of Indian Institute of Corporate Affairs - the apex think tank of the Ministry of Corporate Affairs from April 2024 to March 2025. In April 2025 Pandey joined Asian Infrastructure Investment Bank as a Vice President in Beijing, China.

== Education ==
Pandey gained a Bachelor of Technology degree in Electrical from the Indian Institute of Technology Kanpur (IIT Kanpur). He earned a Master of Science degree and a Doctor of Philosophy degree in computer science from the University of Minnesota under Jaideep Srivastava.

== Career ==
Pandey has served as the Revenue Secretary of India, the Finance Secretary of India, Principal Secretary (Information Technology), the managing director of Maharashtra State Electricity Distribution Corporation, secretary to the Chief Minister of Maharashtra, Deputy Commissioner (Sales Tax) and as the district magistrate and collector of a district in the Maharashtra government; and as the chairperson of the Goods and Services Tax Network, director general and mission director in UIDAI, deputy director general in UIDAI, and as a deputy secretary in the Ministry of Labour and Employment in the Indian government.

== Chief Executive Officer of the Unique Identification Authority of India ==
Pandey was appointed as the chief executive officer (CEO) of the Unique Identification Authority of India by the prime minister-headed Appointments Committee of the Cabinet (ACC) in May 2016, he assumed office on 31 May 2016.

In June 2017, after Pandey's promotion, the status of CEO of UIDAI was upgraded to be equivalent to a secretary to the Government of India from additional secretary to the Government of India.

== Chairperson of the Goods and Service Tax Network ==
Pandey was given the additional charge of chairperson of the Goods and Services Tax Network by the ACC in September 2017. He assumed office on 10 September 2017.
