= T. V. Somanathan =

Cabinet Secretary of India

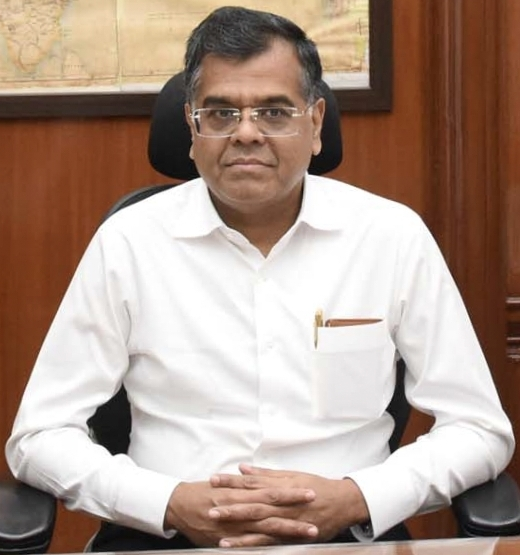

33rd Cabinet Secretary of India
- Incumbent
- Assumed office 30 August 2024
- Appointed by: Appointments Committee of the Cabinet
- Prime Minister: Narendra Modi
- Preceded by: Rajiv Gauba

Finance Secretary of India
- In office 28 April 2021 – 30 August 2024
- Appointed by: Appointments Committee of the Cabinet
- Minister: Nirmala Sitharaman
- Preceded by: Ajay Bhushan Pandey
- Succeeded by: Tuhin Kanta Pandey

Expenditure Secretary of India
- In office 13 December 2019 – 30 August 2024
- Preceded by: Girish Chandra Murmu
- Succeeded by: Manoj Govil

Personal details
- Born: 10 May 1965 (age 61) Tamil Nadu, India
- Education: Panjab University (BCom) (M.A); University of Calcutta (PhD Economics); Institute of Chartered Accountants in England and Wales
- Occupation: IAS officer

T. V. Somanathan (born 10 May 1965) is an Indian bureaucrat and IAS officer who is serving as the Cabinet Secretary of India since 30 August 2024. Before this, he served as the Finance Secretary of India (Department of Expenditure). Prior to this appointment, he served as Additional Secretary and Joint Secretary in the Prime Minister's Office (PMO). He also worked as Director at the World Bank Group, Washington D.C., where he initially joined under its Young Professionals Program. He is a 1987 batch Indian Administrative Service (IAS) officer of the Tamil Nadu cadre.

== Education ==
Somanathan holds a Ph.D. in economics from Calcutta University, an Executive Development Program diploma from Harvard Business School, Master of Arts and Bachelor of Commerce degrees from Panjab University. He is also a Fellow of the Institute of Chartered Accountants in England & Wales (FCA), the Chartered Institute of Management Accountants, London, the Institute of Chartered Secretaries, London, the Association of Chartered Certified Accountants, London, the Institute of Company Secretaries of India and the Institute of Cost Accountants of India. Somanathan has published numerous articles and papers on economics, finance, governance and public policy in academic journals and in the Hindu, Business Standard, Business Line, Indian Express, Fortune India, Yojana, Kurukshetra etc. He also was a Young Professional for the World Bank Group (1996).

== Career ==
Somanathan appeared for the 1987 Union Public Service Commission (UPSC) Civil Services Examination and secured an All India Rank of 2nd behind Amir Subhani, who was the topper of the 1987 UPSC Civil Services Examination. Somanathan joined Indian Administrative Service getting posted in the Tamil Nadu Cadre.

Somanathan has served in various positions for both the Government of India and the Government of Tamil Nadu, including as Secretary to the Chief Minister, Managing Director of the Chennai Metro Rail Corporation, Principal Secretary in Special Initiatives department and Planning & Development department, Joint Secretary in the Ministry of Corporate Affairs, Additional Secretary in the Prime Minister’s Office (PMO), Commissioner for Commercial Taxes, Tamil Nadu and served as the Finance Secretary of India.

=== Cabinet Secretary of India ===
T.V Somanathan took charge as Cabinet Secretary from Rajiv Gauba on 30 August 2024 after serving as Officer on Special Duty in the Cabinet Secretariat.

== Publications ==
- Somanathan, T. V. (1998). Derivatives. McGraw Hill Education. ISBN 1108402712.
- Somanathan, T. V. (2005). Public Institutions in India Chapter entitled Civil Service An Institutional Perspective. Oxford University Press.
- Somanathan, T. V. & Anantha Nageswaran, V (2015). The Economics of Derivatives, Cambridge University Press.
