= Finance Secretary (India) =

Administrative head of the Ministry of Finance

Finance Secretary of India
- भारत के वित्त सचिव

- Flag of India
- Ministry of Finance
- Reports to: The Finance Minister
- Residence: New Moti Bagh, New Delhi, India
- Seat: Ministry of Finance; North Block, Cabinet Secretariat; Raisina Hill; New Delhi
- Appointer: Appointments Committee of the Cabinet
- Term length: co-terminus with superannuation, term can be extended.
- Formation: 1947; 79 years ago
- Salary: ₹225,000 (US$2,400) monthly
- Website: Official Website

The Finance Secretary (ISO: Vitta Saciv) is the administrative head of the Ministry of Finance. This post is held by senior IAS officer of the rank of Secretary to Government of India.

Under Section 22, of Reserve Bank of India Act, 1934, Finance Secretary signs the 1-rupee note.

As a Secretary to Government of India, the Finance Secretary ranks 23rd on Indian Order of Precedence.

== Powers, responsibilities and postings ==
Finance Secretary is the administrative head of the Ministry of Finance, and is the principal adviser to the Finance Minister on all matters of policy and administration within the Finance Ministry. The senior most Secretary among the five Secretaries of the five Departments of the Ministry of Finance, viz. Economic Affairs, Expenditure, Financial Services, Revenue and Investment & Public Assets Management of Ministry of Finance, is designated as Finance Secretary.

The role of Finance Secretary is as follows:

- To act as the administrative head of the Ministry of Finance. The responsibility in this regard is complete and undivided.
- To act as the chief adviser to the Finance Minister on all aspects of policy and administrative affairs.
- To represent the Ministry of Finance before the Public Accounts Committee of the Parliament of India.
- To act as the first among equals among secretaries in the Ministry of Finance.

== Emolument, accommodation and perquisites ==
The Finance Secretary is eligible for a Diplomatic passport. The official earmarked residence of the Union Finance Secretary is 5, New Moti Bagh, New Delhi, a Type-VIII bungalow.

As the Finance Secretary is of the rank of Secretary to Government of India, his/her salary is equivalent to Chief Secretaries of State Governments and to Vice Chief of Army Staff/Commanders, in the rank of Lieutenant General and equivalent ranks in Indian Armed Forces.

Finance Secretary monthly pay and allowances
Base Salary as per 7th Pay Commission (Per month)	Pay Matrix Level	Sources
₹225,000 (US$2,400)	Pay Level 17	

== List of former finance secretaries ==
#	Name	Period	Notes / Ref(s)
1	K.R.K Menon	1947 – 1954	
2	K. G. Ambegaonkar	1954 – 1955	Later served as the Governor of the Reserve Bank of India in 1957.
3	Hirubhai M. Patel	1955 – 1958	Served as the Defence Secretary (1947-53); Served as the Minister of Finance (1977-79); Served as the Home Minister (1979)
4	A. K. Behera	1958 – 1960	
5	S. Bhoothalingam	1960 – 1964	
6	Lakshmi Kant Jha	1964 – 1966	Later served as the Governor of the Reserve Bank of India from 1967 to 1970
7	Sarukkai Jagannathan	1967 – 1968	Later served as the Governor of the Reserve Bank of India from 1970 to 1975
8	B D Pande	1969 – 1972	Later served as the Cabinet Secretary, Government of India from 1972 to 1977 and as Governor of Punjab from 1983 to 1984.
9	M.R. Yeshudas	1972 – 1974	-
10	N. C. Sen Gupta	1975	Later served as the Governor of the Reserve Bank of India from May to August, 1975
11	Montek Singh Ahluwalia	1993 – 1998	A Key Figure In India’s Economic Reforms From The Early 1980s Onwards, He Has Held Several Important Positions Including Special Secretary to the Prime Minister of India (1988–90); Commerce Secretary (1990–91); Secretary, Department of Economic Affairs, Ministry of Finance (1991–93). Later Served As The Deputy Chairman Of The Planning Commission, Government Of India From 2004 to 2014.
12	Vijay Laxman Kelkar	1998 – 1999	Renowned Indian Economist And Academic
13	Ashok Lavasa	2016 – 2017	Later EC, Election Commission of India and then VP, Asian Development Bank
14	Hasmukh Adhia	2017 – 2018	Later Chairman, Bank of Baroda
15	Ajay Narayan Jha	2018 – February 2019	Later Member, Fifteenth Finance Commission, Sixteenth Finance Commission
16	Subhash Chandra Garg	March 2019 – July 2019	Served as Secretary (EA) from 2017 and designated Finance Secretary in March 2019.
17	Rajiv Kumar	August 2019 – 29 February 2020	Later served as Election Commissioner and then Chief Election Commissioner of India
18	Dr. Ajay Bhushan Pandey	March 3, 2020 to February 28, 2021	Later Chairman National Financial Reporting Authority
19	Dr. T. V. Somanathan	April 28, 2021 to August 30, 2024	Later Cabinet Secretary of India
20	Tuhin Kanta Pandey	September 7, 2024 to February 28, 2025	Later Chairman Securities and Exchange Board of India
21	Ajay Seth	March 24, 2025 - June 30, 2025	Later Chairman Insurance Regulatory and Development Authority

== See also ==
- Cabinet Secretary of India
- Secretary of the Research and Analysis Wing
- Home Secretary of India
- Foreign Secretary of India
- Defence Secretary of India
