= Ashok Lavasa =

Indian Administrative Service Officer

Ashok Lavasa IAS
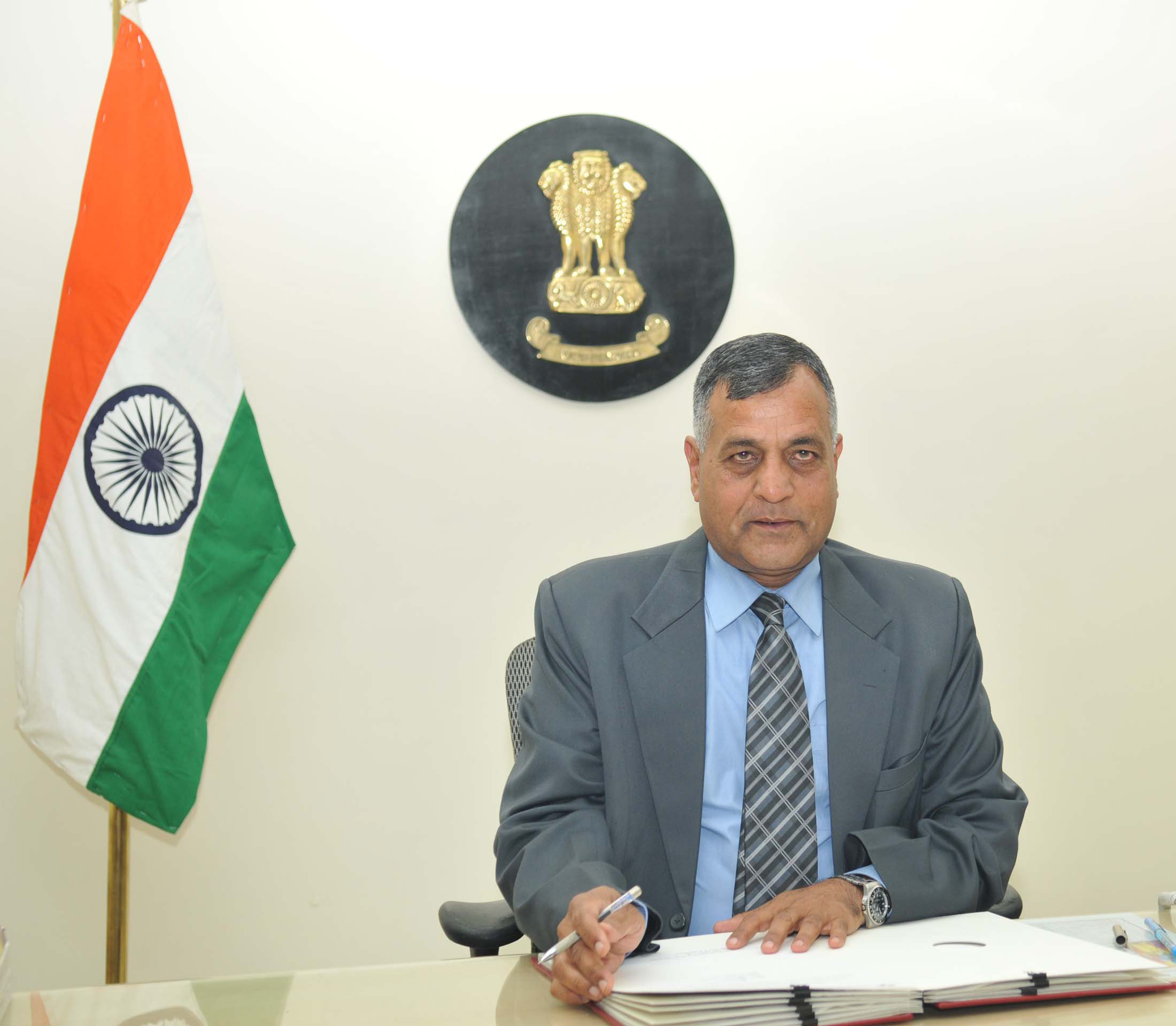
- Lavasa as Election Commissioner

Election Commissioner of India
- In office 23 January 2018 – 18 August 2020
- Appointed by: President of India then, Ram Nath Kovind
- Vice President: Venkaiah Naidu
- Preceded by: G. V. G. Krishnamurty
- Succeeded by: Rajiv Kumar

Finance Secretary of India (in charge of Department of Expenditure)
- In office 30 April 2016 – 30 October 2017
- Appointed by: Appointments Committee of the Cabinet
- Preceded by: Ratan P. Watal
- Succeeded by: Ajay Narayan Jha

Environment, Forests and Climate Change Secretary of India
- In office 29 August 2014 – 30 April 2016
- Appointed by: Appointments Committee of the Cabinet
- Preceded by: V. Rajagopalan
- Succeeded by: Ajay Narayan Jha

Civil Aviation Secretary of India
- In office 1 January 2014 – 29 August 2014
- Appointed by: Appointments Committee of the Cabinet
- Preceded by: K. N. Srivastava
- Succeeded by: V. Somasundaran

Personal details
- Born: 21 October 1957 (age 68) Rajasthan, India
- Education: (B.A.) Delhi University (M.A.) Hindu College, Delhi Delhi University (MBA) Southern Cross University
- Occupation: Retired IAS officer

Ashok Lavasa (IAST: Aśoka Lavāsā) (born 21 October 1957) is a retired 1980 batch Indian Administrative Service officer of Haryana cadre and was one of the two Election Commissioners of India. He has also served as the Finance Secretary of India, Environment, Forests and Climate Change Secretary of India and Civil Aviation Secretary of India. He served as the vice president of Asian Development Bank (ADB) from August 2020 to August 2023.

== Education ==
Ashok Lavasa did his schooling from Belgaum Military School. He is a graduate (BA Honours) from Delhi University and a postgraduate (MA) in English from Hindu College, Delhi of Delhi University. He has an MBA degree from Southern Cross University in New South Wales, Australia, and an MPhil in defence and strategic studies.

== Career ==
=== Before IAS ===
Before being appointed as an IAS officer, Lavasa taught literature in the Delhi University. He also had a stint with the State Bank of India as a probationary officer.

=== As an IAS officer ===
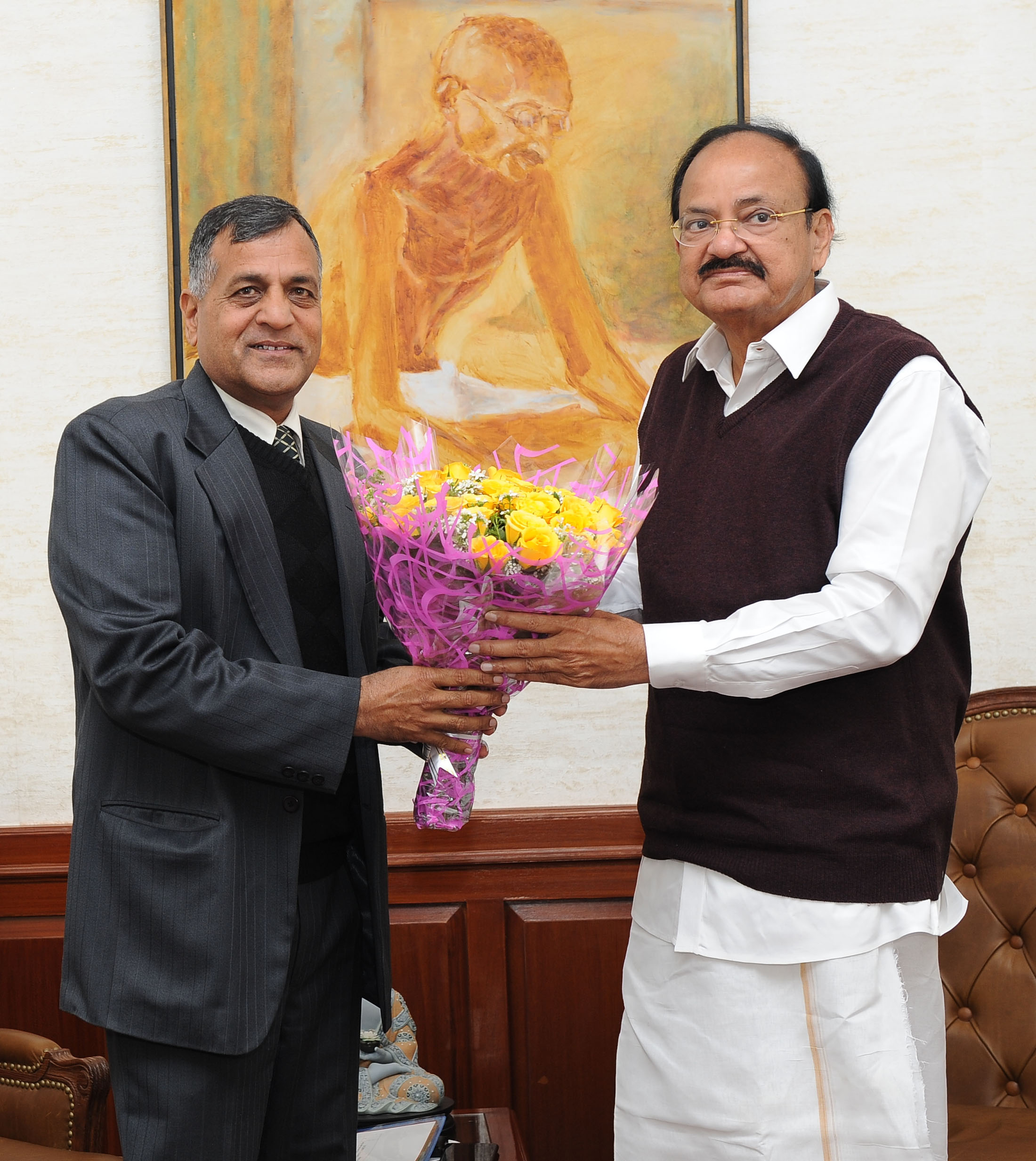
Lavasa calling on the Vice President of India, Venkaiah Naidu in February 2018

Lavasa has served in key positions for both the Government of India and the Government of Haryana, like as Principal Secretary and Financial Commissioner (Renewable Energy Sources), Principal Secretary and Financial Commissioner (Power), Chief Coordinator (Industries), resident commissioner of Haryana, managing director of Haryana State Federation of Co-operative Sugar Mills (HSFCOSML), director of Haryana State Industrial Development Corporation (HSIDC), managing director of Haryana Tourism Corporation (HTC), and as the deputy commissioner and district magistrate of Jind and Gurgaon districts in the Haryana government, and as the Union Finance Secretary, Union Environment, Forests and Climate Change Secretary, Union Civil Aviation Secretary, special secretary in the Ministry of Power, joint secretary in the Ministry of Home Affairs, and as a joint secretary in the Department of Economic Affairs of the Ministry of Finance in the Indian government.

==== Civil Aviation Secretary ====
Lavasa was appointed as the Union Civil Aviation Secretary by the Appointments Committee of the Cabinet (ACC) in December 2013. He assumed office on 1 January 2014, and demitted it on 29 August 2014, when he was appointed as the Union Environment, Forests and Climate Change Secretary.

==== Environment, Forests and Climate Change Secretary ====
Lavasa was appointed as the Union Environment, Forests and Climate Change Secretary by the Appointments Committee of the Cabinet (ACC) in August 2014. He assumed office on 29 August 2014, and demitted it on 30 April 2016, when he was appointed as the Union Expenditure Secretary.

==== Expenditure Secretary ====
Lavasa was appointed as the Union Expenditure Secretary by the Appointments Committee of the Cabinet (ACC) in April 2016. He assumed office on 30 April 2016, and demitted it and simultaneously superannuated from service on 30 October 2017.

As the seniormost secretary in the Ministry of Finance after the retirement of Ratan Watal, Lavasa was designated as Finance Secretary in May 2016.

=== Post-retirement ===
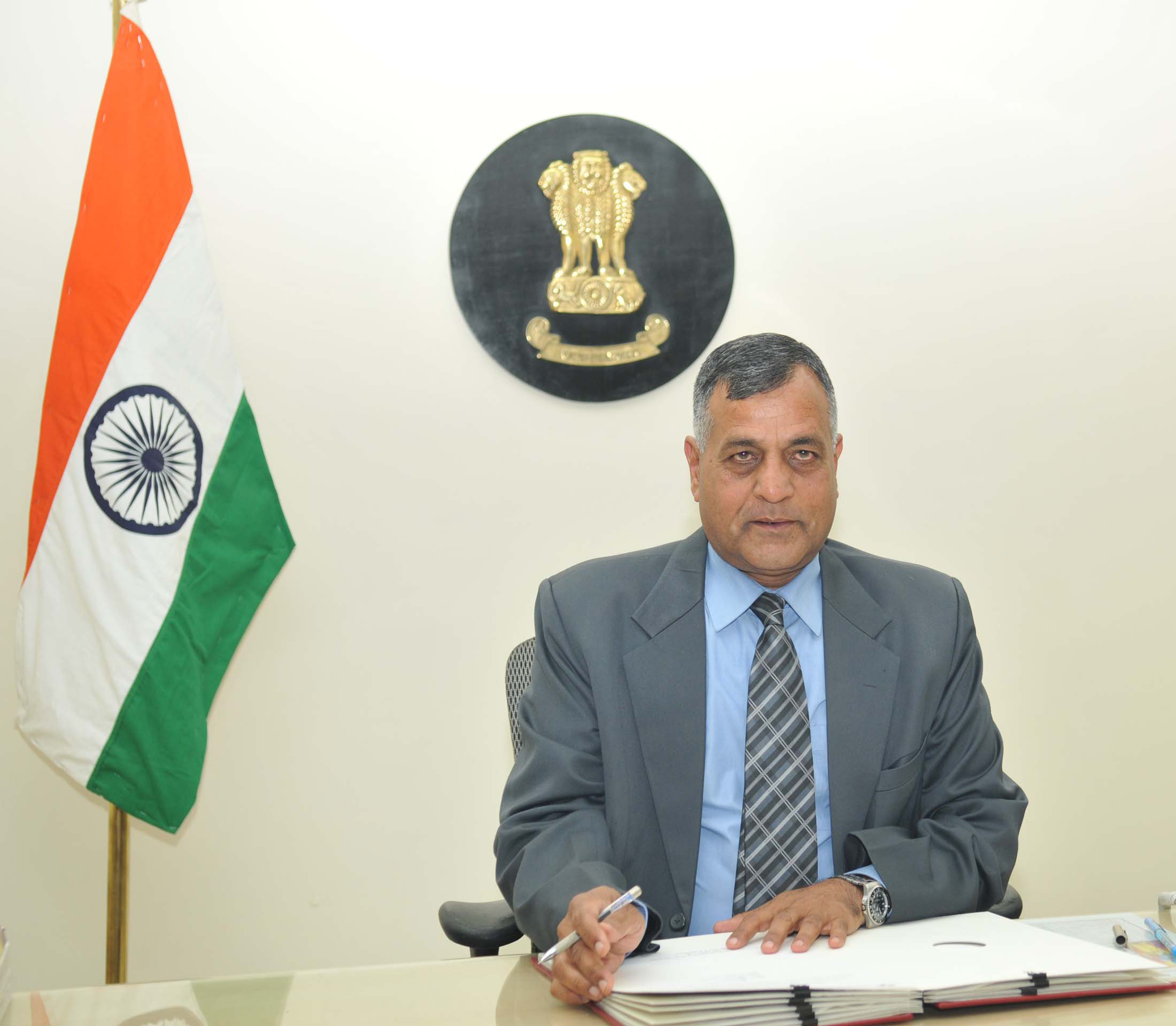
Lavasa taking charge as one of the two Election Commissioners of India in February 2018

==== Election Commissioner of India ====
Post-retirement, Lavasa was appointed as one of the two Election Commissioners of India in January 2018. He assumed charge as Election Commissioner on 23 January 2018.

Lavasa made headlines in 2019 after a dissenting opinion on a panel's ruling of complaints against Prime Minister Narendra Modi and Amit Shah during the Lok Sabha election campaign.

Six complaints were filed against PM Modi. Lavasa disagreed with his panel colleagues in some of these cases.

He soon stopped attending meetings, saying "minority decisions" were being "suppressed in a manner contrary to well-established conventions observed by multi-member statutory bodies".

In December 2019, Lavasa in an article in the Indian Express wrote: "The honest, however, go on regardless, perhaps driven by an inner force that borders on recklessness. A society that creates hurdles which exhaust the honest or wound them paves the path for its own perdition".

This was two months after an income tax notice was sent to his wife, Novel S Lavasa, over alleged discrepancies in filings. Sources had said the information had been sought "related to foreign exchange". Mrs Lavasa said she had "paid all taxes due" and "disclosed all income" and that she was cooperating.

He served as vice president of Asian Development Bank (ADB) from 31 August 2020 to 31 August 2023.

== Work ==
- Lavasa, Ashok; Sethi, Ravi Mohan (2010). An Uncivil Servant: The Success Story of a Bureaucrat Turned Businessman. New Delhi: Rupa Publications. ISBN 978-81-291-1704-5.
- Lavasa, Ashok (2021): An Ordinary Life: Portrait of an Indian Generation. Harper India ISBN 978-93-5422-317-4
