= Swami Vivekananda Yoga Anusandhana Samsthana =

Higher education institute

Swami Vivekananda Yoga Anusandhana Samsthana, abbreviated S-VYASA or SVYASA, is a higher education institute deemed to be university located in Bangalore, India. The university is dedicated to the study of yoga based on the teachings of Swami Vivekananda. Dr. N K Manjunath is the current Vice Chancellor of the university.

SVYASA is a leading university in India, accredited at A+ level by NAAC and approved by AICTE. SVYASA University is rated at 4 star by Karnataka State Universities Rating Framework.

SVYASA University offers programs, from undergraduate, Master's, and Ph.D, that blend tradition with modern advancements. Students at S-VYASA undergo a unique form of education that integrates Life Training and Character Building through Yoga as a way of life. The institution blends the Gurukula style of education with a modern scientific approach, placing a strong emphasis on practical, hands-on experience and in-depth research.

NIMHANS and S-VYASA are working together on schizophrenia and neurological disorders like migraine and dementia.

S-VYASA specialises in two fields: Yoga research and Yoga therapy. The main campus Prashanti Kutiram is on Vivekananda Road, Kalluballu Post, Jigani, Anekal, Bengaluru and the Global City Campus is at Sattva Global City, Mysore Road, Rajarajeshwari nagar, Bengaluru.

== Programs Offered ==
| Main Campus | Global City Campus |
|---|---|
| B.Sc. in Yoga Therapy | B.Tech. in AI & ML |
| B.Sc. in Yoga & Vedic Therapy | B.Tech. in Computer Science & AI (offered in academic affiliation with Bosscoder School of Technology) |
| Bachelor of Naturopathy and Yogic Sciences | B.Tech. in Cyber Security |
| Post-Graduate Diploma in Yoga Therapy | B.Tech. in Data Science |
| Post Graduate Yoga Diploma for Doctors | B.Tech. in Software Engineering |
| Master of Science in Yoga Therapy | B.Tech. in Information Technology |
| Master of Science Yoga & Vedic Therapy | M.Tech. |
| MD - Yoga | M.C.A. |
| Ph.D. Yoga | B.C.A. |
| Ph.D. Applied Sciences | B.Sc. Computer Science |
| | M.Sc. Cyber Security |
| Certificate Courses | B.Com. |
| Yoga Instructor Course | B.B.A. |
| Aerial Yoga Teacher Training Course | M.B.A. |
| Ayurveda Lifestyle Management Courss | Bachelor of Occupational Therapy (BOT) |
| Self Management of Excessive Tension | Bachelor of Physiotherapy |
| | B.Sc. Clinical Psychology |
| | M.Sc. Clinical Psychology |
| | Ph.D. Computer Science |
| | Ph.D. Computer Science and Engineering |
| | Ph.D. Commerce and Management |
| | Ph.D. Applied Sciences |

== Claims of forthcoming yoga-based cures ==
The Union Minister of State for AYUSH, Shripad Yasso Naik claimed after visiting S-VYASA in 2016 that "many people told us they have been cured of cancer by regular practice of yoga. The institute has found a technique of yoga for the prevention and cure of cancer". This statement drew strong criticism from oncologists like Raja Sarin of the Tata Memorial Centre and V. Shantha of the Adyar Cancer Institute, with the former saying "Three quarters of patients in India come to hospitals with end stage cancer. Late diagnosis is already a problem in India. This [the Minister’s statement] should not add to the problem". Naik further claimed that it would become possible to treat diabetes the same way.

== Notable alumni ==
- Hasmukh Adhia, former Finance Secretary for the Government of India.
