= State Trading Corporation building =

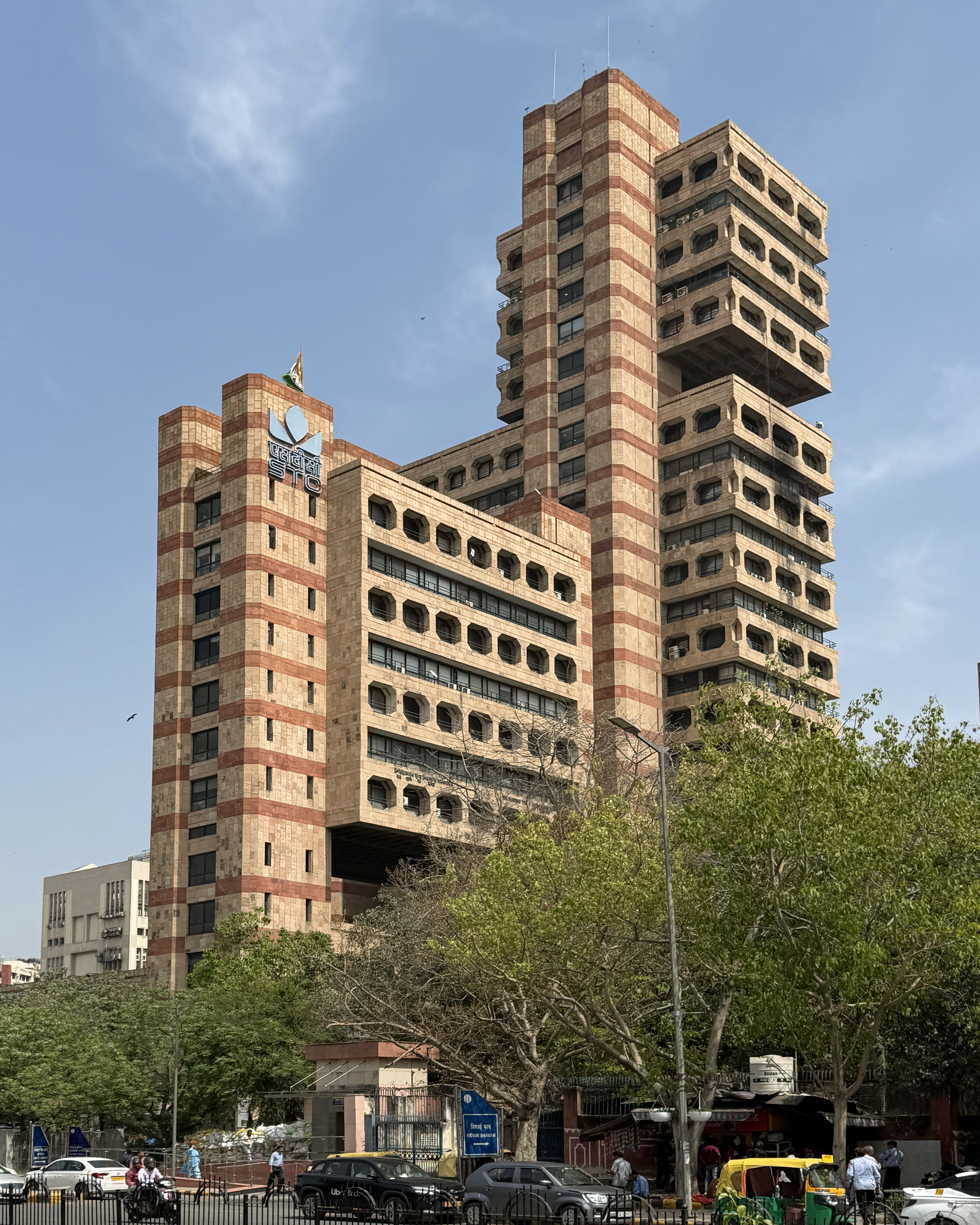
- Interactive map of the State Trading Corporation building area

General information
- Type: Office building
- Architectural style: Metabolist-inspired
- Location: Tolstoy Marg; New Delhi
- Coordinates: 28°37′32.6″N 77°13′12.5″E
- Construction started: 1976
- Completed: 1989; 37 years ago
- Owner: State Trading Corporation of India

Height
- Roof: 84.5 m (277 ft)

Technical details
- Floor count: 23, 18, 12 (three towers)
- Floor area: 44,000 sq. m.

Design and construction
- Architecture firm: Raj Rewal Associates
- Structural engineer: Mahendra Raj
- Main contractor: Universal Contractors and Engineers

State Trading Corporation building (also known as Jawahar Vyapar Bhawan) in New Delhi, India, was designed by the architect Raj Rewal, and is home to the government-owned State Trading Corporation of India. Built between 1976 and 1989, it is considered to be an important example of modernist architecture in post-Independence India. Rewal used elements from the Japanese Metabolism style, but departed from it by drawing inspiration from Mughal architecture, as seen in the polychromatic sandstone cladding, instead of concrete. The "structurally expressive" design employs Vierendeel trusses. Apart from offices, the building houses the Central Cottage Industries Emporium, a government-run store that retails Indian crafts products.

== Bibliography ==
- Haddad, Elie; Rifkind, David, eds. (2014). A Critical History of Contemporary Architecture: 1960-2010. Ashgate Publishing. ISBN 9781472429377.
- Scriver, Peter; Srivastava, Amit (2015). India: Modern Architectures in History. Reaktion Books. ISBN 9781780234687.
