= Fourteenth Finance Commission =

2013 finance commission of India

The Fourteenth Finance Commission of India was a finance commission constituted on 2 January 2013. The commission's chairman was former Reserve Bank of India governor Y. V. Reddy and its members were Sushma Nath, M. Govinda Rao, Abhijit Sen, Sudipto Mundle, and AN Jha. The recommendations of the commission entered force in April 2015; they take effect for a five-year period from that date.

The government of India on 24 February 2015 accepted the recommendations of the fourteenth finance commission for increasing share of states in central taxes to 42%, the single largest increase ever recommended. It has recommended distribution of goods to states for local bodies using 2011 population data with weight of 90% & area with weight of 10%.

== Review of the previous term ==
=== Fiscal performance ===
Sr.Num	Particulars as percentage of GDP	2001-02	2004-05	2007-08	2008-09	2009-10	2010-11	2011-12	2012-2013	Change 2012–13 over 2007-08	2013-2014(RE)	2014-2015(BE)
I	Total Revenue Receipts (a+b)	8.55	9.44	10.87	9.60	8.84	10.13	8.34	8.69	-2.17	9.06	9.24
a)	Non Tax Revenue	2.88	2.50	2.05	1.72	1.79	2.81	1.35	1.36	-0.69	1.70	1.65
b)	Net Tax Revenue	5.67	6.93	8.81	7.87	7.05	7.32	6.99	7.34	-1.48	7.36	7.59
II	Revenue Expenditure	12.80	11.85	11.92	14.10	14.08	13.37	12.72	12.30	0.38	12.33	12.18
Of which: Interest	4.56	3.92	3.43	3.41	3.29	3.01	3.03	3.10	-0.33	3.35	3.32	
III	Capital Expenditure	2.58	3.50	2.37	1.60	1.74	2.01	1.76	1.65	-0.72	1.68	1.76
IV	Total Expenditure (II+III)	15.38	15.35	14.29	15.70	15.82	15.38	14.48	13.95	-0.34	14.01	13.94
V	Revenue Deficit (II-I)	4.3	2.5	1.1	4.5	5.2	3.2	4.4	3.6	2.5	3.3	2.9
VI	Fiscal Deficit	6.1	4.0	2.5	6.0	6.5	4.8	5.7	4.8	2.3	4.6	4.1
VII	Non-debt Capital Receipts	0.85	2.05	0.88	0.12	0.51	0.45	0.41	0.40	-0.48	0.32	0.57

=== Union ===
- Union debt had remained with in the limits set by the previous commission. This is primarily because of a high nominal growth in GDP.
- Gross tax revenues, after reaching a peak of 11.9 per cent of GDP in 2007–08, had declined by over 1.7 percentage points in 2012–13. Rates of excise duties and service tax were reduced in response to the global economic crisis.
- The tax-GDP ratio had declined.
  - Interest receipts on loans outstanding from State Governments had declined.
  - There was fluctuation in non-debt capital receipts.
  - Disinvestment receipts fell short of the estimates.
- States were excluded from much of the divisible pool because of forgone revenues, tax expenditures, and expanding cess and surcharge rates.
- Quality of fiscal management was characterized by a less than desirable growth in revenues, a steep reduction in capital expenditures and high level of subsidies.

=== States ===
- There was improvement in the fiscal position of all States taken together. Aggregate gross fiscal deficit and revenue deficit, relative to GDP, declined by 1.4 percentage points each. The primary deficit, relative to GDP, declined by 0.2 percentage points.
- The fiscal health was possible due to an increase in the aggregate revenue receipts

by 1.2 percentage point relative to GDP.

  - States' own tax receipts, relative to GDP, had increased by 0.9 percentage point.
  - Tax devolution to the states from Union had increased by 0.5 percentage point.
  - Grants in aid from the central schemes had increased by 0.2 percentage point.
  - Own non-tax revenues had decreased by 0.2 percentage point.
- Capital expenditures fell marginally relative to GDP and there was only a marginal change in overall expenditures relative to GDP.
  - Interest payments had reduced by 1.2 percentage points and so the revenue expenditure decreased by the 1.2 percentage points.
  - Pension increased the expenditure by 0.2 percentage points
  - Social services increased the expenditure by 0.9 percentage point.
  - Economic services increased the expenditure by 0.1 percentage point.
- The aggregate outstanding debt and liabilities, as a percentage of GDP, also progressively reduced.

== Recommendations ==
=== Sharing of Union tax revenues with states ===
Transfers from Union to states consist of tax devolution, non-Plan grants, Plan grants and grants for various Central Supported Schemes (CSS) including those which were transferred directly to the implementing agencies bypassing the budget.

==== Inputs to the commission ====
View	Stakeholder	The Commission
Keep the current devolution ratios	Union	Rejected
Increase in the share of tax devolution	States	Accepted
Expansion of the divisible pool with cess and surcharges	States	Rejected
Minimum guaranteed tax devolution	States	Rejected
Reduced role of Centrally sponsored schemes (CSS)	States	Accepted
Keep 50% of proceeds from a state in devolution	States	Rejected
Earmark 10–30% of devolution for special category status	States	Rejected
Include demographic change in criteria	States	Accepted
Equality adjusted Human Development Index as criteria	States	Rejected

==== Vertical devolution ====
The fourteenth finance commission is of the view that tax devolution should be the primary route of resources to the states. The commission recommends to increase the tax devolution of the divisible pool to states to 42% for years 2015 to 2020. This is 10% more compared to 32% target set by 13th financial commission.

The commission recommended that the new tax devolution should be the primary route of transfer of resources to States since it is formula based and thus conducive to sound fiscal federalism. However, to the extent that formula-based transfers do not meet the needs of specific States, they need to be supplemented by grants-in-aid.

The commission felt that new target serve the twin objectives of increasing the flow of unconditional transfers to the States and yet leave appropriate fiscal space for the Union to carry out other duties and specific purpose transfers to the States.

==== Horizontal devolution ====
The commission came up with new formula to divide the 42% share of the divisible pool between the states.

===== Area =====
The commission followed the method adopted by the 12th commission and put the floor limit at 2 percent for smaller States and assigned 15 percent weight.

===== Forest cover =====
The commission assigned 7.5 per cent weight to forest cover as the new criteria to balance the benefit of the huge ecological benefits and the opportunity cost in terms of area not available for other economic activities that becomes indicator of fiscal disability.

===== Population =====
The commission felt that allocation based on dated population data is not fair, and assigned a 17.5 percent weight to the 1971 population and assigned 10 percent a weight to the 2011 population to capture the demographic changes since 1971, both in terms of migration and age structure.

===== Income distance =====
The commission assigned 50% weight to income distance as it is the only measure of fiscal capacity. It is the distance of actual per capita income of a state from the state with the highest per capita. The commission calculated the income distance following the method used the 12th commission. A three-year average (2010-11 to 2012–13) per capita comparable GSDP has been taken for all the twenty-nine states. Income distance has been computed by taking the distance from the state having highest per capita GSDP. Goa had the highest, followed by Sikkim. Since these two are very small states, income distance had been computed from the third, Haryana. Goa, Sikkim and Haryana are assigned the same distance as obtained for Haryana.

Criteria	13th Commission Weight(%)	14th Commission Weight (%)
Population 1971	25	17.5
Population 2011	0	10
Income Distance	47.5	50
Fiscal Discipline	15	0
Area	10	15
Forest Cover	0	7.5
Sum	100	100

==== Horizontal share of States ====
The commission came up with the following share of States based on the criteria and the consideration that service tax is not levied and so can not be shared with the State of Jammu & Kashmir.

States	Share(%)
Andhra Pradesh	4.305
Arunachal Pradesh	1.370
Assam	3.311
Bihar	9.665
Chhattisgarh	3.080
Goa	0.378
Gujarat	3.084
Haryana	1.084
Himachal Pradesh	0.713
Jammu & Kashmir	1.854
Jharkhand	3.139
Karnataka	4.713
Kerala	2.500
Madhya Pradesh	7.548
Maharashtra	5.521
Manipur	0.617
Meghalaya	0.642
Mizoram	0.460
Nagaland	0.498
Odisha	4.642
Punjab	1.577
Rajasthan	5.495
Sikkim	0.367
Tamil Nadu	4.023
Telangana	2.437
Tripura	0.642
Uttar Pradesh	17.959
Uttarakhand	1.052
West Bengal	7.324
Sum	100.000

=== Local governments ===
The commission had allocated grants and also identified many sources of income for local bodies and provided the guidelines to Union and State governments to empower them.

==== Grant allocation ====
The grants by Union government are to be used only on the basic services within the functions assigned to them by legislation, water supply, sanitation, sewerage, storm water drainage, solid waste management, street lighting, local body roads and footpaths, parks, playgrounds etc.

The Commission fixed the total size of the grant to be Rs. 2,87,436 crore for the period 2015–20, constituting an assistance of Rs. 488 per capita per annum at an aggregate level. Of this, the grant for panchayats is Rs. 2,00,292.2 crore and for municipalities is Rs. 87,143.8 crore.

Local Body	Amount(crores)
Panchayats	2,00,292.2
Municipalities	87,143.8
Sum	2,87,436

==== Grant devolution ====
The Commission recommended that distribution of grants shall be given to the States using 2011 population data with weight of 90 percent and area with weight of 10 per cent. The grant to each State will be divided into two - a grant to duly constituted gram panchayats and a grant to duly constituted municipalities, on the basis of urban and rural population of that State using the data of Census 2011.

Criteria	13th Commission Weight(%)	14th Commission Weight (%)
Population in 2011		90
Area		10

===== Timetable =====
Each grant has two components, basic and performance. The commission recommends that 50 per cent of the basic grant for the year is to be released to the State as the first installment of the year. The remaining basic grant and the full performance grant for the year may be released as the second instalment for the year. The State Government have to release the grants to the local bodies within fifteen days of it being credited to their account by the Union Government. In case of any delay, the State Governments have to pay the installment with interest paid from its own funds.

===== Gram Panchayats =====
In the case of gram panchayats, 90 per cent of the grant will be the basic grant and 10 per cent will be the performance grant. The grants for Panchayats should go only to them without any share for other levels of government in State. State Governments has to take care of the needs of the other levels and districts.

Grants for gram panchayats with in a State will be distributed using the formula chosen by a state finance commission. In case the SFC formula is not available, then the share of each gram panchayat will be on the basis on 2011 population with a weight of 90 per cent and area with a weight of 10 per cent.

===== Municipalities =====
In the case of municipalities, the division between basic and performance grant will be on an 80:20 basis. The basic grant for urban local bodies will be divided into tier-wise shares and distributed across each tier, the municipal corporations, municipalities (the tier II urban local bodies) and the nagar panchayats (the tier III local bodies) using the formula given by a state finance commission. In case the SFC formula is not available for urban local bodies, shares of each of the three tiers will be on the basis of population of 2011 with a weight of 90 percent and area with a weight of 10 percent, and then distributed among the entities in each tier in proportion using same formula. local body are tender process are not transparent local body are tenderRule hard so some near people come in tender and

===== Performance Grants =====
The performance grants will be given from the second year or 2016 onwards. To be eligible for performance grants,

- The local bodies and State government have to submit audited annual accounts that relate to a year not earlier than two years preceding the year in which the body seeks the performance grant.
- They have to show an increase in the own revenues of the local body over the preceding year.
- In case of urban local bodies, they have to measure and publish service level benchmarks for basic services.

The undisbursed amount should be distributed on an equitable basis among all the eligible local bodies for the performance grant in the State.

===== Empowering local bodies =====
State governments has to ensure that local bodies get revenue from all local sources.

- Have to review existing rules to facilitate the levy of property tax and reassess properties by local bodies.
- Have to strengthen SFC with timely constitution and administrative support.
- Have to allow panchayats to levy of vacant land tax and land conversion charges.
- Have to take steps to empower local bodies to impose advertisement tax.
- Review entertainment tax and allow share to local urban bodies.
- Share royalties from mining where the mine is located.
- Allow local bodies to explore issuing the municipal bonds.

=== Fiscal plan ===
Devolution to special States

  - 1.94 lakh Crores is to be used as the post devolution revenue deficit grant for the 11 states with gaping Revenue Deficits.
  - Fiscal Deficit is to be reduced to 3% of GDP, Revenue Deficit to be 0% by 2017.
  - Medium term fiscal plan (MTFP) is to be the statement of commitment instead of the statement of intent.
  - A target of 62% of GDP is to be set for the combined debt of center and states. This is improvement over the 68% set by the previous commission.
  - States are to be eligible for an additional borrowing limit of 0.25% of GSDP.
  - The current FRBM Act is to be amended to explain the nature of shocks which require relaxation from the target and to be merged with a Debt ceiling and Fiscal responsibility Act.
- Actions to address the less fiscal space with the center.
  - An independent council is to be set up to assess the fiscal policy implications.
  - Inter state council to be expanded for co-operative federalism to identify sector specific grants to states.
  - Initiatives to reduce 30 central sponsored schemes. The central government has accepted 8 of them.

=== Good and Services Tax (GST) ===
The commission recommended the Union to establish GST compensation fund. This compensation is to be used to address 100% of the shortfall in the first year, 75% in the second year and 50% in the third year. This additional fiscal burden on the Union government has to be taken as investment to get yields in the medium and long run.

=== National Disaster Relief Fund ===
The financing of the NDRF had been from levying cess on some selected items and some of them will be subsumed by GST. The commission recommended the Union Government to ensure an assured source of funding. The commission recommended to consider tax exemption to private contributions to the NDRF.

The commission recommended to review the reimbursement of expenditure incurred by the defense forces to not hinder their efficiency during disaster relief.

The commission recommended the Union Government to expedite the development and scientific validation of the Hazard Vulnerability Risk Profiles of States.

The commission recommended to keep an aggregate corpus for all States of Rs. 61,219 crore for the five years based on the expenditure from the past years. The commission recommended all States to contribute 10 per cent and Union with the remaining 90 per cent. Considering the need for regard to state-specific disasters, the commission recommended that up to 10 per cent of the funds available under the SDRF can be used by States for natural disasters that they consider to be 'disasters' within the local context in the State and which are not included in the notified list of disasters of the Ministry of Home Affairs.

=== Public utilities ===
==== Power ====
The commission recommend3e that 100 per cent metering be achieved in a time-bound manner for all electricity consumers.

The Electricity Act, 2003, currently does not have any provision of penalties for delays in the payment of subsidies by State Governments. The commission recommended that the Act be suitably amended to facilitate levy of such penalties.

Electricity Act allows a State Electricity Regulatory Commission Fund by State Governments, to enable the SERCs to perform their responsibilities. The commission recommended all States to set up SERC Fund, as statutorily provided.

==== Transport ====
The commission recommended Rail Tariff Authority (RTA) to do expeditious replacement of the advisory body with a statutory body with needed amendments to the Railways Act, 1989.

The commission recommended accounting systems in the SRTUs to make explicit all forms of subsidy, the basis for determining the extent of subsidies, and also the extent of reimbursement by State Governments.

The commission recommended to set up independent regulators for the passenger road sector to help in tariff setting, regulation of service quality, and the collection and dissemination of sector information. SASAS

==== Water supply ====
The commission recommended all States to set up Water regulation authority (WRA) to set up pricing of water for domestic, irrigation and other uses. It recommended all States to invest in volumetric measurement of the use of irrigation water. It also recommended the States and local bodies to progressively move towards 100 per cent metering of water and to complete metering by 2017 with the cost to be borne by the consumers. The commission recommended to give new connections in urban bodies only when the functioning meters are set up.

=== Public sector companies ===
The commission recommended that a Financial Sector Public Enterprises Committee be appointed to examine and recommend parameters for appropriate future fiscal support to financial sector public enterprises, recognizing the regulatory needs and the multiplicity of units in each activity.

The commission recommended to categorize public sector companies as high, low and non priority to decide current policy and future course of action.

The commission recommended to wind up the National Investment Fund and to keep all the receipts from disinvestment to be kept with the Consolidated Fund of India.
