= National Institute of Public Finance and Policy =

Research institute in India

- National Institute of Public Finance and Policy (NIPFP) logo

Agency overview
- Parent department: Ministry of Finance, Government of India
- Website: https://www.nipfp.org.in/

The National Institute of Public Finance and Policy (NIPFP) is an autonomous research institute under India's Ministry of Finance.

== History ==
Based in New Delhi, India, the centre conducts research on public finance and contributes to the process of policy-making relating to public finance. The NIPFP also works jointly with the Department of Economic Affairs at the Ministry of Finance to research the effects of past economic policy.

NIPFP is overseen by a governing board comprising a chairman and representatives from the Ministry of Finance, Planning Commission of India and Reserve Bank of India. Urjit Patel is the present chairman and R Kavita Rao is the present director of the institute. The previous director was Pinaki Chakraborty and chairman was Vijay Kelkar.

== Campus ==
Spread over an area of 3 acres, the institute is situated near Jawaharlal Nehru University and the Indian Institute of Technology. The campus consists of two academic and an office block, residential quarters, a hostel (guest house).

== See also ==
- National Council of Applied Economic Research
- List of think tanks in India
