= Tolstoy Marg =

Road in Delhi

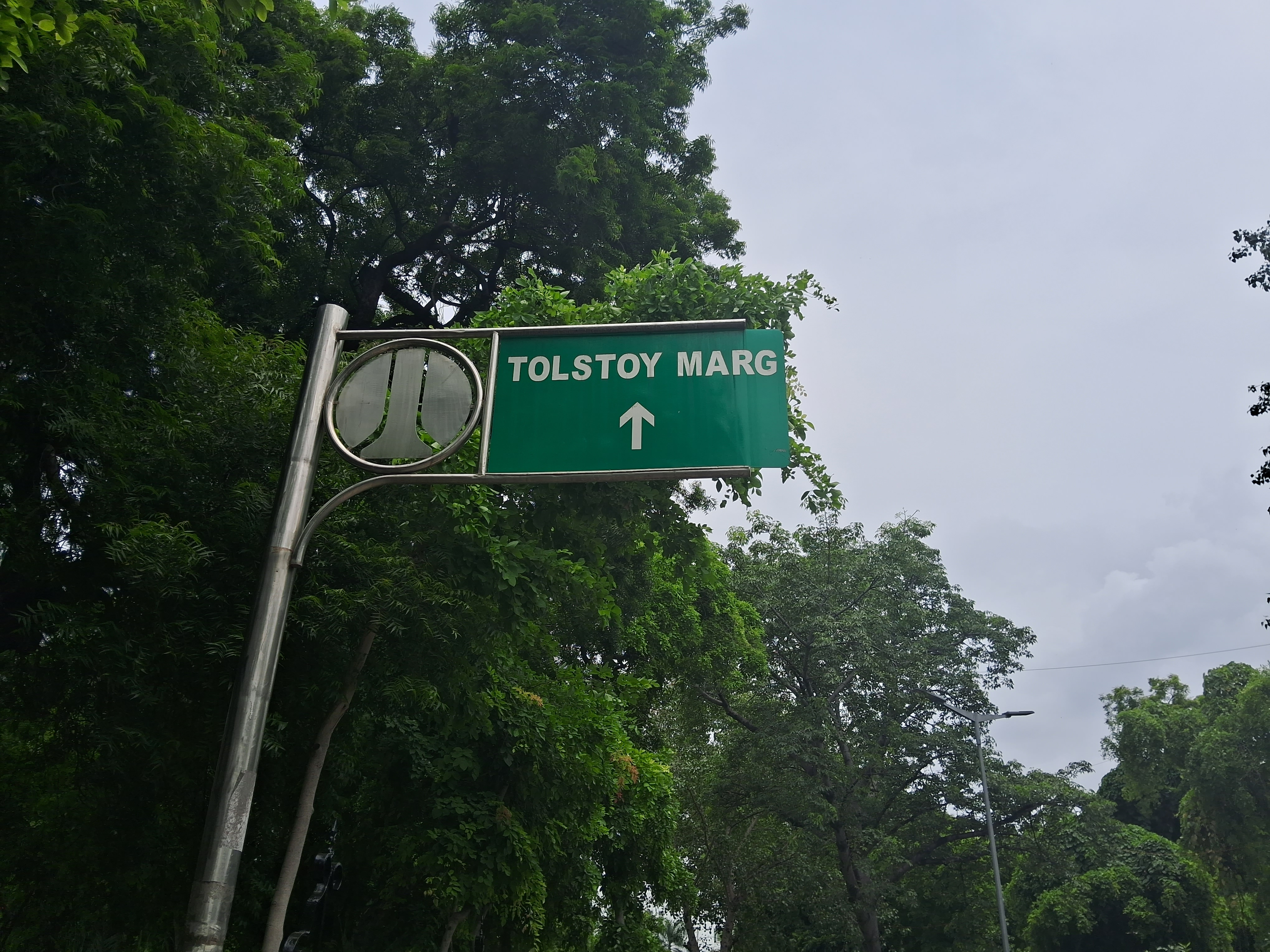
A Tolstoy Marg Signboard in Connaught Place

Tolstoy Marg (Hindi: टॉलस्टॉय मार्ग, lit. 'Tolstoy Road') is a road in the Connaught Place, New Delhi area.

This road was named after famous Russian writer Leo Tolstoy.

Tolstoy Marg links Barakhamba Road and Maharaja Ranjit Singh Marg intersection, to Sansad Marg intersection. Inside Connaught Place, the road connects to other important roads like Jantar Mantar Road, Janpath, Atul Grove Road, and Kasturba Gandhi Marg. Tolstoy Marg houses many commercial offices and offices of some Public Sector Enterprises as well.

Tolstoy Marg is usually the focal point of protest marches and other political rallies in the city. Political rallies towards Ramlila Maidan in Delhi, often passes through Tolstoy Marg.

== History ==
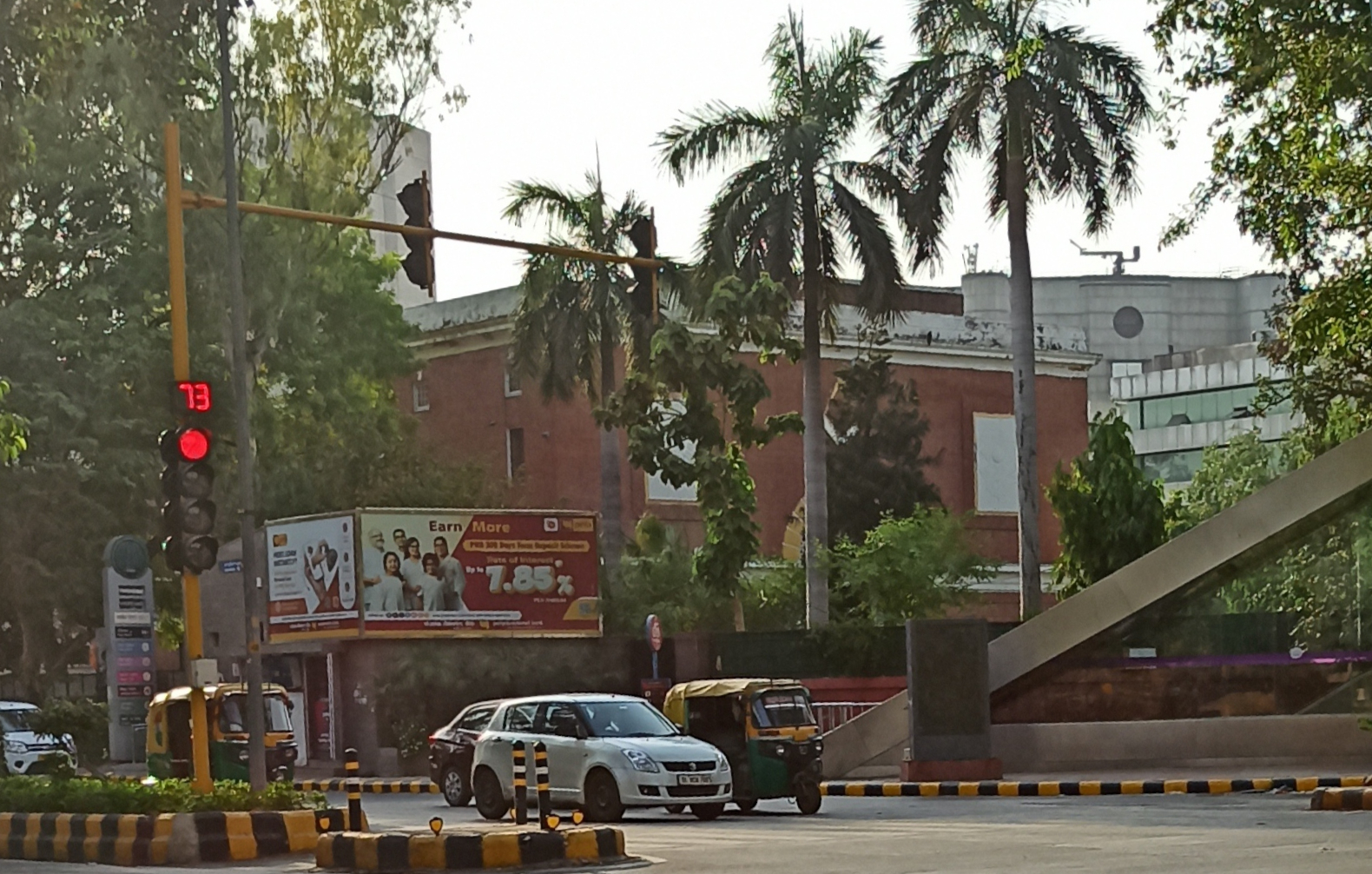
Freemasons Hall, Janpath.

Tolstoy Marg was constructed during the British era, when Robert Tor Russell was designing the Connaught Place. In those days it was named as Keeling Road, after Hugh Keeling, who was the Chief Engineer of Delhi.

During the Partition of India in 1947, several Muslim families who were residents of Keeling Road, had moved to Pakistan, and likewise people coming to India from Pakistan had made Keeling road their new home.

Prominent leader Deshbandhu Gupta also used to live in a big house on Keeling Road. He was a resident of "5, Keeling Road".

When the headquarters of Communist Party of India were shifted from Bombay to New Delhi in 1951, they were first housed on "4, Keeling Road".

In 1962, to meet the increasing need of commercial space in Central part of Delhi, Delhi Development Authority (DDA) had decided to extend Connaught Place Commercial Area up to the Keeling Road. It was done under "Delhi Master Plan 1962".

This road was renamed as Tolstoy Marg in 1968.

During Soviet era, Information Department of the USSR Embassy in India, was situated nearby on 25, Barakhamba Road of New Delhi. Soviet Airlines Aeroflot had an office on Tolstoy Marg, which is currently shifted to nearby Barakhamba Road.

== Tolstoy statue and Tolstoy House ==
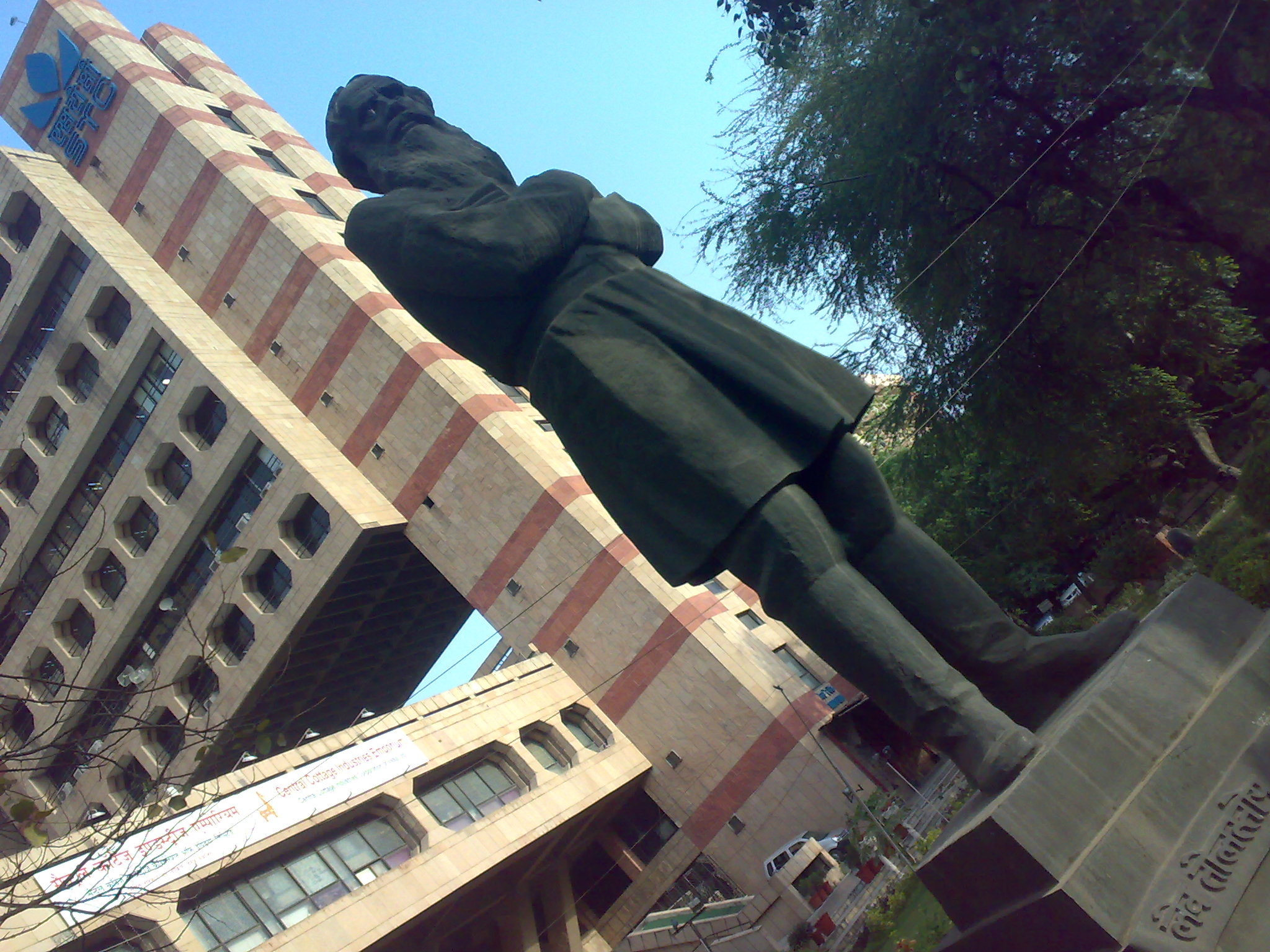
Statue of Leo Tolstoy on Tolstoy Marg

On the sidewalk of a road where Tolstoy Marg meets Janpath, there stands a black colored bronze statue of Leo Tolstoy, that was installed here in 1994. This statue was constructed in USSR in 1989. However it was only after the Dissolution of the Soviet Union, that the statue was finally installed on the Tolstoy Marg. This statue was inaugurated by Russian Prime Minister Viktor Chernomyrdin in 1994 during his visit to India. This statue faces a heritage building "Freemasons Hall" which is situated opposite side, on the Janpath Road, and this building was constructed in the year 1936.

The Tolstoy Statue on this road often witnesses the gathering of the fans of Russian Literature, Leo Tolstoy, and Mahatma Gandhi.

Presently a building called Tolstoy House is also situated on this road.

== Notable establishments ==
Notable establishments on Tolstoy Marg include:

- State Trading Corporation of India (STC).
- Small Industries Development Bank of India (SIDBI).
