= Principal secretary (India) =

Indian governmental post

Principal secretary is a post in state governments and the central government of India. The position holder is generally a senior Indian Administrative Service officer or other senior civil servants. Principal secretaries generally are the administrative heads of departments in a state government. They can also be deputed to central government in the post of an Joint Secretary to Government of India.

== Position ==
=== Principal secretary in a state government ===
In the state governments, a principal secretary ranks above a secretary but it is below the designations of additional chief secretary and chief secretary. Principal Secretaries act as administrative heads of the department they are assigned to.

=== Principal Secretary to the Prime Minister ===
The post of Principal Secretary to the Prime Minister of India was created during the tenure of Indira Gandhi as prime minister. The Principal Secretary to PM is the head of the Prime Minister's Office. He/she holds the rank and status of Cabinet Secretary to the Government of India. Additionally, some prime ministers also appoint an additional principal secretary, who too holds the rank and status of Cabinet Secretary to the Government of India.

== Courts ==
In Jammu and Kashmir High Court, there is a Principal Secretary to the Chief Justice, he is of a senior district and sessions judge rank. He attends matters pertaining to the employees of subordinate judiciary such as appointments, transfers, promotions and leave. He is also ex officio secretary of Public Interest Litigation Cell. He also attends all other matters assigned by the chief justice. He is overall in charge of chief justice's secretariat.
