= Luigi Zingales =

Italian economist and author (born 1963)

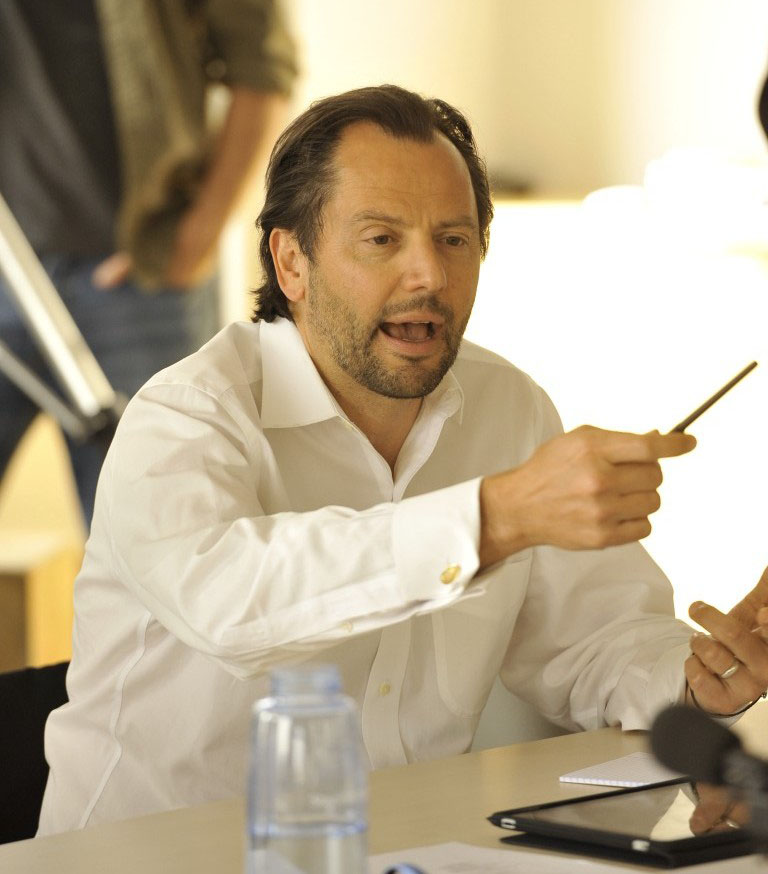
- Born: 8 February 1963 (age 63); Padua, Italy

Academic background
- Education: Bocconi University (BA); Massachusetts Institute of Technology (PhD)
- Doctoral advisor: James M. Poterba; Oliver Hart

Academic work
- Discipline: Business economics
- Institutions: University of Chicago, U.S.
- Website: Information at IDEAS / RePEc

Luigi Zingales (Italian pronunciation: [luˈiːdʒi ddziŋˈɡaːles]; born 8 February 1963) is an Italian economist who is a finance professor at the University of Chicago Booth School of Business. His book Saving Capitalism from the Capitalists (2003) is a study of "relationship capitalism". In A Capitalism for the People: Recapturing the Lost Genius of American Prosperity (2012), Zingales "suggests that channeling populist anger can reinvigorate the power of competition and reverse the movement toward a 'crony system'."

== Career ==
Zingales received a bachelor's degree in economics from Bocconi University in Milan. In 1992 he earned a Ph.D. in Economics from the Massachusetts Institute of Technology with the completion of his thesis, titled The value of corporate control, under the supervision of James M. Poterba and Oliver Hart. In the same year he joined the faculty of the University of Chicago Booth School of Business, where he is the Robert C. McCormack Distinguished Service Professor of Entrepreneurship and Finance. Zingales also serves as a member of the Committee on Capital Markets Regulation. He also co-hosts the podcast Capitalisn't along with journalist Bethany McLean.

== Positions ==
Zingales has voiced support for greater regulation of the banking and technology industries. Perhaps most interesting is his support of the United States debt ceiling, which is almost universally held in low regard by his colleagues.

In July 2012, Zingales took part in the 'No-Brainer Economic Platform' project of NPR's program Planet Money. He supported a six-part reform plan that involved eliminating all American income, corporate, and payroll taxes as well as the war on drugs and replacing the system with a broad consumption tax (including taxing formerly illegal substances).

Zingales generated controversy in 2018 when he invited former White House Chief Strategist Steve Bannon to debate globalization and immigration at the University of Chicago against an undecided expert in the field. The decision sparked protests from students and faculty given Bannon's history of controversial statements.

== Studies ==
His main field of study is business economics, with a heavy focus on organizations and entrepreneurship.

== Awards ==
He was the winner of the 2003 Germán Bernácer Prize to the best European economist under 40 working in macro-finance. In 2012, he was named by Foreign Policy magazine to its list of FP Top 100 Global Thinkers, "For reminding us what conservative economics used to look like."

== Books ==
- Saving Capitalism from the Capitalists, Random House, New York, 2003; Co-authored with Raghuram G. Rajan
- A Capitalism for the People: Recapturing the Lost Genius of American Prosperity, Basic Books, New York, 2012
