= A Capitalism for the People =

A Capitalism for the People: Recapturing the Lost Genius of American Prosperity
- First edition
- Author: Luigi Zingales
- Language: English
- Subject: Crony capitalism
- Genre: Nonfiction
- Publisher: Basic Books
- Publication date: June 5, 2012
- Publication place: United States
- Media type: Print (hardcover), audiobook
- Pages: 336
- ISBN: 978-0-465-02947-1

A Capitalism for the People: Recapturing the Lost Genius of American Prosperity is a non-fiction book by the Italian writer and economist Luigi Zingales, who is known for serving as a Professor of Entrepreneurship and Finance at the University of Chicago's Booth School of Business. Zingales also authored the book Saving Capitalism from the Capitalists, released in 2003.

In A Capitalism for the People, Zingales writes that he wants to rescue markets and competition from the twin forces that threaten them: over-regulation on the political left and, on the right, a pro-business (as opposed to pro-market) ideology. He sees the great threat to the U.S. economy as being crony capitalism, laying out what he sees as persuasive evidence, and makes suggestions on how to channel populist anger, reverse the movement toward a crony system, reduce the opportunities for rent seeking, and increase the opportunities for competition. He advocates reforms such as greater transparency with economic data as well as with restrictions on lobbying.

Zingales has answered questions on A Capitalism for the People during the Business Daily programme on World Service BBC. He has presented the book at the London School of Economics, where he warned that the U.S. economy risks deteriorating into a Berlusconi-style crony-capitalist system—pro-business rather than pro-market, and run by corrupt politicians who are more concerned with lining the pockets of the connected elite than with improving opportunity for the people.

The book has received positive reviews from a variety of publications such as EconTalk, Publishers Weekly, and The Sacramento Bee.

== Background and contents ==
Zingales writes that the U.S. government's role in the economy has risen significantly between 1900 and 2005, with the fraction of GDP controlled by state rising eightfold. He states that big businesses have used this to their advantage. He elaborates the distinction of how polls state that most Americans support a free market system in principle but oppose business cronyism in practice, and he notes that, in U.S. history, democracy preceded industrialization while access to a broad frontier allowed for personal initiative. Thus, he calls for mass populist social agitation to promote serious market competition, advocating reforms such as restraining lobbying.

== Reviews and reception ==
Economist and EconTalk program host Russ Roberts praised the book as "a really fantastic ride through a whole bunch of economic, philosophical, and ethical issues related to the current state of the economy and how they can become better." He also called it "just a fascinating and educational look at a wide range of issues". Economist Tyler Cowen stated on his website Marginal Revolution that the book "hits all the right notes" and "is clearly written", leading him to agree "with almost all of it."

Publishers Weekly stated that Zingales made an "engaging if imprecise argument" that "persuasively demonstrates the urgent need for action." The publication also commented that Zingales' specific reconciliations appeared overly vague, especially compared to his listing of problems with the American economic system. Still, Zingales' "insight that intellectual and economic freedom are intertwined and that business schools and academics can promote the common good" was praised.

Ben Boychuk wrote for the Sacramento Bee placing the book on his "good reads" summer list, and he remarked that it should appeal to both Tea Party activists and the Occupy Wall Street movement.

== See also ==
- 2012 in literature
- Crony capitalism
- Saving Capitalism from the Capitalists
