= Committee on Comprehensive Financial Services for Small Businesses and Low Income Households =

Committee on Comprehensive Financial Services for Small Businesses and Low Income Households (commonly known as the Nachiket Mor Committee) was an expert committee formed by Raghuram Rajan on 23 September 2013, after he was appointed as the governor of the Reserve Bank of India (RBI). It was headed by Nachiket Mor. The objective of the panel was to study various aspects of financial inclusion in India. The panel submitted its final report on 7 January 2014.

== Members ==
The committee was chaired by Nachiket Mor, a member of the Central Board of the RBI. Other members of the committee were:

- Bindu Ananth, president of IFMR Trust;
- Prakash Bakshi, chairman of NABARD;
- Bharat Doshi, chairman of Mahindra & Mahindra Financial Services Limited;
- A. P. Hota, managing director and CEO of National Payments Corporation of India;
- Sunil Kaushal, CEO of Standard Chartered Bank India;
- Roopa Kudva, managing director and CEO of CRISIL;
- Zia Mody, managing partner of AZB & Partners;
- S. S. Mundra, chairman and managing director of Bank of Baroda;
- Vikram Pandit, former CEO of Citigroup (2007–2012);
- Ramesh Ramanathan, chairman of Janalakshmi Financial Services;
- Shikha Sharma, managing director and CEO of Axis Bank
- A. Udgata, principal chief general manager and member secretary of RBI

S. Karuppasamy and Deepali Pant Joshi, both executive directors of RBI were observers.

== Summary of report ==
The panel recommended the formation of a new category of banks called payment bank, to reach people and small businesses who don't have access to banking services. These banks would have low entry requirements and existing banks would be allowed to form subsidiaries under this category. The panel also recommended the formation of another category called wholesale banks, to provide liquidity to other banks and financial institutions which are creating assets in the priority sector. The entry requirement for this category would also be low. The banks would primarily issue loans and would be allowed only to accept deposits larger than INR 5 Crore(₹50,000,000).

The panel proposed that every adult Indian be granted a Universal Electronic Bank Account (UEBA) by January 2016. It also proposed that all low-income and small businesses be given access to banking services by January 2016. It also proposed that an UEBA be automatically opened for every citizen at the amount he/she receives their Aadhaar number.

== Criticism ==
N. K. Thingalaya, former chairman and managing director of Syndicate Bank, said that there was no need for a new category of banks as several Regional Rural Banks (RRBs) already existed in India. He said that this system of rural banks had been not properly used. M. S. Sriram of Centre for Public Policy said that report failed to address the last-mile delivery problems.

== See also ==
- Raghuram Rajan Committee on Financial Sector Reforms
- Committee on Medium-term Path on Financial Inclusion, a subsequent committee formed in 2015 to create a 5-year plan
