= Committee on Medium-term Path on Financial Inclusion =

Committee on Medium-term Path on Financial Inclusion was an experts committee formed by the Reserve Bank of India (RBI) on 15 July 2015 to create a five-year plan for financial inclusion in India. It was headed by Deepak Mohanty, executive director of RBI.

It published its final report in December 2015 with a number of recommendations split into 10 broad areas.

== Members ==
The committee was headed by Deepak Mohanty. Other members of the committee were:

- Ashok Gulati, Infosys Chair Professor for Agriculture, Indian Council for Research on International Economic Relations (ICRIER)
- Asli Demirgüç-Kunt, director of research, The World Bank
- A. P. Hota, MD & CEO, National Payments Corporation of India
- Paresh Sukthankar, deputy managing director, HDFC Bank
- Kishor P. Kharat, executive director, Union Bank of India
- Subrata Gupta, chief general manager, National Bank for Agriculture and Rural Development
- Pawan Bakhshi, head – Financial Services for the poor programme in India, Bill and Melinda Gates Foundation
- Sudarshan Sen, principal chief general manager, Department of Banking Regulation, Reserve Bank of India
- Arun Pasricha, chief general manager, Consumer Education and Protection Department, Reserve Bank of India
- Nanda S. Dave, chief general manager, Department of Payment and Settlement Systems, Reserve Bank of India
- Y. K. Gupta, director, Department of Statistics and Information Management, Reserve Bank of India
- Saibal Ghosh, deputy adviser, research, Centre for Advanced Financial Research and Learning (CAFRAL)

== Objective ==
The objective of the committee was to examine the existing policy regarding financial inclusion and to form a five-year action plan. The plan had several components with regard to payments, deposits, credit, social security transfers, pension and insurance.

== See also ==
- Raghuram Rajan Committee on Financial Sector Reforms
- Committee on Comprehensive Financial Services for Small Businesses and Low Income Households
