= Nachiket Mor =

Indian banker

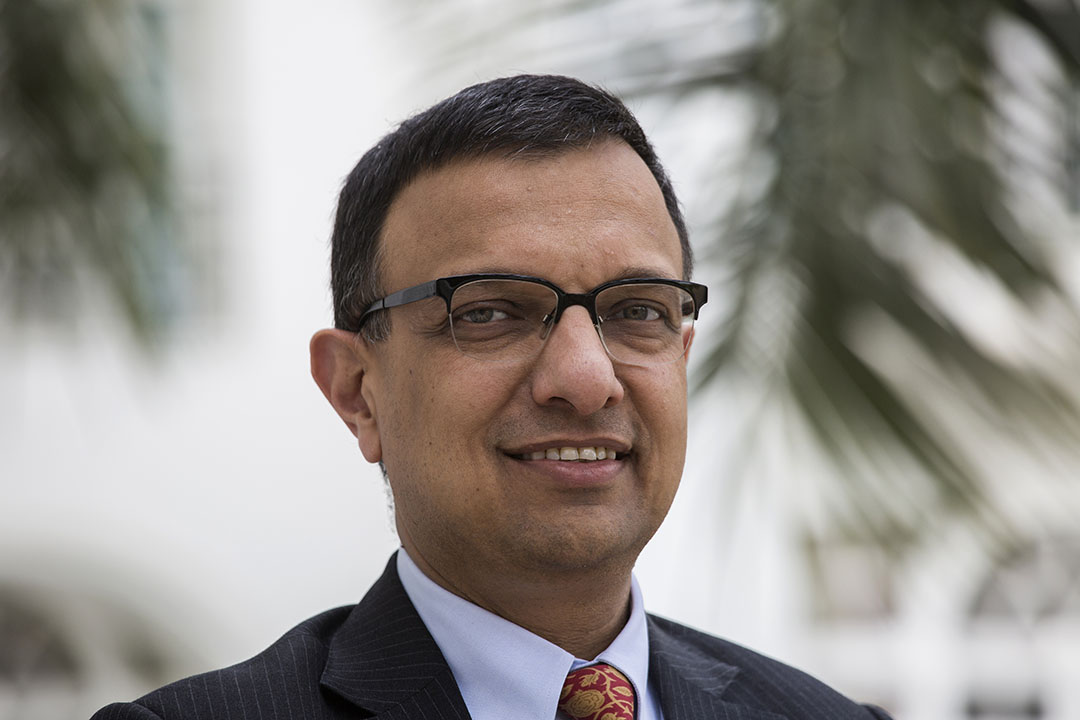
- Born: Yavatmal, Maharashtra, India
- Occupations: National Director, Bill and Melinda Gates Foundation - India
- Known for: inventions of financial devices to deliver banking service to villages and contribution in trying to solve India's financial inclusion problem.
- Board member of: CARE India, National Bank for Agriculture and Rural Development

Nachiket Mor is an Indian banker. He was earlier the National Director for Bill and Melinda Gates Foundation. He is known for his inventions of financial devices to deliver banking service to villages and contribution in trying to solve India's financial inclusion problem.

He is also the Chairman of the board of directors of CARE India.

== Early life and education ==
Mor was born into a farming family in Yavatmal, Maharashtra. He has a bachelor's degree in Physics from Mumbai University. He has a master's degree in Management from Indian Institute of Management Ahmedabad (IIM-A), where he was a classmate of Raghuram Rajan. He also has a PhD in Economics from the University of Pennsylvania, with a specialisation in Finance from the Wharton School.

== Career ==
After completing his MBA, he joined a non-government organisation called Pradan, where he worked with mushroom farmers. He was then recruited by K.V. Kamath for ICICI Bank in 1987. In mid-1990s, he left to do his PhD at Wharton School and returned.

In late 2007, he left ICICI Bank to head the newly founded ICICI Foundation for Inclusive Growth to rural development. In May 2009, Intuit appointed Mor to its India advisory board. In September 2010, he left the foundation to work with an organisation called SughaVazhvu (Tamil for happy life), which works to provide better health care to villages.

In May 2013, he was appointed as a director in the Central Board of the Reserve Bank of India (RBI) and its local board in the eastern area. In September 2013, Committee on Comprehensive Financial Services for Small Businesses and Low Income Households was formed which was headed by Nachiket Mor. In October 2013, he was included in the 4 member RBI panel led by Bimal Jalan which examine applications for new bank licenses.

In March 2016, he took over as head of the Bill and Melinda Gates Foundation's India country office, and served in that position until March 2019.
