= Saving Capitalism from the Capitalists =

2003 finance book by Rajan and Zingales

Saving Capitalism from the Capitalists: Unleashing the Power of Financial Markets to Create Wealth and Spread Opportunity
- Author: Raghuram Rajan and Luigi Zingales
- Publication date: 2003
- ISBN: 0-609-61070-8

Saving Capitalism from the Capitalists: Unleashing the Power of Financial Markets to Create Wealth and Spread Opportunity is a non-fiction book by Raghuram Rajan and Luigi Zingales of the University of Chicago Booth School of Business. It was published in hardcover in 2003 by Crown Business (ISBN 0-609-61070-8) and released in softcover by Princeton University Press in 2004 (ISBN 0-691-12128-1).

The book is neither a defense of pure laissez-faire capitalism, nor is it an anti-capitalist polemic. Instead, the authors develop the following arguments in the book:

- The free market is the form of economic organization most beneficial to human society and for improving the human condition.
- Free markets can flourish over the long run only when government plays a visible role in determining the rules that govern the market and supporting it with the proper infrastructure.
- Government, however, is subject to influence by organized private interests
- Incumbent private interests, therefore, may be able to leverage the power of governmental regulation to protect their own economic position at the expense of the public interest by repressing the same free market through which they originally achieved success.
- Thus, society must act to "save capitalism from the capitalists"—i.e. take appropriate steps to protect the free market from powerful private interests who would seek to impede the efficient function of free markets, entrench themselves, and thereby reduce the overall level of economic opportunity in society.

The authors offer the following recommendations:

- Reduce incumbent capitalists' incentives to oppose markets, especially by limiting the concentration of ownership of productive assets.
- Provide a social safety net for the economically distressed to help maintain broad political support for free markets.
- Keep the borders of the economy open to support free trade and maintain a high level of competitive pressure on incumbent firms.
- Educate the public regarding the benefits of free markets to build political support for free market policies, or more specifically, oppose governmental interventions in the market designed to protect incumbents at the expense of overall economic opportunity.

The book has been translated into the following languages: Italian, Japanese, Mandarin Chinese, Portuguese, and Russian.

== See also ==
- 2003 in literature
- A Capitalism for the People
- Corporate welfare
- Crony capitalism
