= Raghuram Rajan Committee on Financial Sector Reforms =

The Raghuram Rajan Committee on Financial Sector Reforms was a committee constituted by the Government of India in 2007 for proposing the next generation of financial sector reforms in India. It was chaired by University of Chicago economist Raghuram Rajan who had earlier been the chief economist at the International Monetary Fund. The committee, in its report titled A Hundred Small Steps, recommended broad-based reforms across the financial sector, arguing that instead of focusing "on a few large, and usually politically controversial steps", India must "take a hundred small steps in the same direction".

== Background ==
In 2007, then Deputy Chairman of the Planning Commission, Montek Singh Ahluwalia, drafted Rajan to write a report proposing the next generation of financial sector reforms in India. The mandate that was given was to take an overall view of the sector in making recommendations, highlighting links between needed reforms, while offering a consistent underlying approach.

== Composition ==
The committee, put together and chaired by Rajan, consisted of twelve members from across the public and private sectors. The members were:

- Raghuram G. Rajan, Professor, Graduate School of Business, University of Chicago (Chairman)
- Suman Bery, Director General, NCAER
- Uday Kotak, CEO, Kotak Mahindra Bank
- Rajiv Lall, CEO, IDFC
- Vijay Mahajan, Chairman, Basix
- Zia Mody, Senior Partner, AZB Partners
- O. P. Bhatt, Chairman, State Bank of India
- K. V. Kamath, MD & CEO, ICICI Bank
- Chitra Ramakrishna, Deputy MD, NSE
- R. Ravimohan, MD & CEO, CRISIL
- J. R. Varma, Professor, Indian Institute of Management, Ahmedabad
- R. Sridharan, Adviser (FR), Planning Commission (Convenor)

== Workings ==
The committee undertook nine formal and eleven informal meetings. In addition, committee members met with numerous stakeholders in the financial sector in putting together the report.

== See also ==
- Committee on Comprehensive Financial Services for Small Businesses and Low Income Households
- Committee on Medium-term Path on Financial Inclusion
