= Crony-capitalism index =

Index published by The Economist

The crony-capitalism index is an index published by the British newspaper The Economist that claims to calculate whether the livelihood of the people from a certain country or city with a capitalist economy is "easily affected by crony capitalism". It is a measurement of crony capitalism designed based on the work by Ruchir Sharma of Morgan Stanley Investment Management, Aditi Gandhi and Michael Walton of Indian think-tank Centre for Policy Research, and others" in 2014.

== Aims ==
The index aims to be a measuring trend in the number of economic rent-seekers. The assumption behind is because of the favorable political policies set by the government officials, the tycoons are increasing their wealth and interest. As a result, they get a larger part of people's fruits of labor, instead of generating more wealth for the whole society. In some extreme cases, some favored suppliers are influential on the establishment and application of the business-impacting laws and citizens pay the tax for purchasing the overpriced products supplied by the favored corporations.

== Methodology ==
Ten of the industries that are susceptible to monopoly or require licensing or highly depend on the government have been selected: casinos; coal, palm oil and timber; defense; deposit-taking banking and investment banking; infrastructure and pipelines; ports; airports; real estate and construction; steel and other metals; mining and commodities; utilities and telecoms services. Then, the total wealth of world's billionaires who actively involve in rent-heavy industries from the data of Forbes will be calculated. Results can be achieved from the ratio of billionaire wealth to GDP in their own countries; higher ratio of billionaire wealth to GDP indicates higher possibility of suffering from crony capitalism.

== Result ==
=== 2023 ===
The 2023 index was published on 2 May 2023. Russia, by far, was the highest, with billionaire wealth from crony sectors amounting to 19% of its GDP. China recorded significant decreases in crony wealth, with total billionaire wealth from crony sectors decreasing from nearly half in 2010 to around a quarter in 2023.

=== 2021 ===
The 2021 index featured, Russia, Malaysia and Singapore as the top three crony-capitalism countries. Russia topped the list with 70% of the 120 billionaires holding 80% of billionaire wealth.

=== 2016 ===
The 2016 index was published on May 7, 2016. India is ranked in ninth position in crony-capitalism with crony sector wealth accounting for 3.4 per cent of the gross domestic product (GDP), according to a study by The Economist. In India, the non-crony sector wealth amounts to 8.3 per cent of the GDP, as per the latest crony-capitalism index.

=== 2014 ===
The results of the crony-capitalist Index of 23 countries were published on March 15, 2014. The five largest developed countries, ten largest developing countries and eight other countries where cronyism was thought to be a big problem being included. Countries not located in the Global North has a relatively higher Crony-Capitalism index than those not in it.

== Criticism ==
The index has been criticized as being a misnomer, as it does not actually calculate the full situation as to what constitutes as crony capitalism, by leaving out crucial sectors or situations such as South Korea's chaebols, Japan's zaibatsu, or lobbying by American companies to the United States Congress such as Google, Facebook and Apple in return for favorable policies and tax schemes, among others.

=== Concealing fortunes ===
According to Bloomberg Businessweek, the phenomenon of concealing fortunes is common for cronies, especially in China. It has been revealed that some of the powerful politicians have disguised their properties by transferring it under the names of their friends and family members. Unreliable property records are also believed to be the obstacles of determining an individual's actual wealth. The fact that the cronies are not willing to announce their wealth publicly has affected the accuracy of the index.

=== Rough categorization ===
The index has also been criticized for only roughly categorizing the industrial sectors with neglected critical instances of cronyism.

=== Limited data for cronyism ===
The index has only counted the wealth of billionaires which contributed to the omission of extensive data. Due to the lack of data, or the data not being publicly available, numerous particular industries in various countries are not identified as "crony heavy", leading to perceived lower crony capitalism even though it may be on the contrary. A group of cronies can also possibly be enriched by plenty of rent-seeking while not wealthy enough to achieve the cut-off. As a result, such groups were not examined in the index.

== See also ==
- Capitalism
- Cartel
- Corporate welfare
- Corporatocracy
- Economic interventionism
- Government failure
- Government-owned corporation
