= I Do What I Do =

2017 non-fiction book by Raghuram Rajan

- Author: Raghuram Rajan
- Language: English
- Publisher: HarperCollins India
- Publication date: September 5, 2017
- Publication place: India
- Media type: Print (hardback)
- ISBN: 978-93-5277-014-4

I Do What I Do is a non fiction book authored by economist and former Governor of the Reserve Bank of India, Raghuram Rajan published by HarperCollins India in 2017. The book is a collection of speeches delivered by Rajan during his stint as the Governor of the Reserve Bank of India along with his commentary on the economic and political context prevalent at that time.

The book was released on September 5, 2017, and quickly made its way to topping the list of best sellers on Amazon India and Flipkart.

The book has had increased media attention and uptake in part due to Dr. Rajan's much respected views on the economy and the political climate, but, also because of Rajan's view on the demonetization exercise undertaken by the Government of India in October 2016. The demonetization exercise had mixed views from economists, with a majority (including Rajan) subscribing to the view that the short term pains inflicted would not justify any purported longer term gains. With that said, Dr Rajan himself is of the view that the data available currently is not fully substantive to determine if the program could be deemed a success. He has further gone on to call that rather than demonetization as an exercise, better end to end income and asset tracking mechanisms, including the usage of biometric systems such as Aadhaar will be instrumental in battling 'black money'.
