= Breaking the Mould =

2023 non-fiction book

Breaking the Mould: Reimagining India's Economic Future
- Author: Raghuram Rajan; Rohit Lamba
- Language: English
- Subject: Indian economy, economic policy, development
- Genre: Non-fiction
- Published: 6 December 2023
- Publisher: Penguin Random House India
- Publication place: India
- Media type: Print (hardcover), e-book
- Pages: 336
- ISBN: 978-9-357-08794-0

Breaking the Mould: Reimagining India's Economic Future is a non-fiction book by economists Raghuram Rajan and Rohit Lamba, published on 6 December 2023 by Penguin Random House India. The book analyses challenges facing the Indian economy, critiques past and present economic policies, and proposes strategies for inclusive growth. Written in a conversational style, it draws on Rajan’s experience as former Reserve Bank of India governor and International Monetary Fund chief economist, and Lamba’s academic perspective. It received positive reviews for its clarity but faced criticism for lacking detailed implementation plans.

== Summary ==
The book’s 12-chapter narrative examines India’s economic trajectory, arguing that the traditional manufacturing-led growth model is less viable today. Rajan and Lamba advocate a service-oriented approach, emphasizing human capital, innovation, and decentralized governance. Key topics include: India’s shift from agriculture to services, bypassing large-scale manufacturing. It advocates for education reform to foster critical thinking, addressing unemployment and regional inequalities, and strengthening local governance.

The book critiques policies like “Make in India” for overemphasizing manufacturing.

== Development and release ==
"India cannot simply follow the path China took ... We argue for a different path, one that leverages India’s strengths in services, its vibrant democracy, and its entrepreneurial energy."

— Raghuram Rajan and Rohit Lamba

The book stemmed from conversations between Rajan and Lamba, who met when Lamba was a graduate student. Lamba’s admiration for Rajan evolved into this collaboration, drawing on Rajan’s policy experience and Lamba’s research at New York University Abu Dhabi. The title reflects their aim to challenge conventional economic models. Announced in mid-2023, it was published on 6 December 2023 in hardcover and e-book formats.

== Critical reception ==
The book was praised for its accessible style. The Hindu Business Line called it “a balanced critique free of ideological baggage”. Mint noted its focus on decentralization but cautioned that its optimism might overlook political hurdles. Hindustan Times deemed it “essential reading for policymakers”. India Today found its ideas compelling but noted a lack of specific implementation details. The Telegraph (India) described it as “a polite yet firm call for reform”. Some reviewers found the proposals ambitious but vague. Business Standard appreciated its “question-driven approach” but sought more actionable steps. Asian Age valued its education focus but questioned its feasibility in India’s political landscape.
