= Cronyism =

Government favoritism

Cronyism is awarding positions, jobs, contracts, loans, privileges, or advantages to friends or colleagues. It is used especially in politics, when referring to partiality between politicians and businesses. A person who supports or partakes in cronyism is referred to as a crony, cronie, or cronyist.

Cronyism occurs when appointing "cronies" to positions of authority regardless of their qualifications. This is in contrast to a meritocracy, in which appointments are made based on merit. Politically, "cronyism" is derogatorily used to imply buying and selling favors, such as votes in legislative bodies, doing favors to organizations, or giving desirable ambassadorships to exotic places.

== Etymology ==
The word crony first appeared in 17th-century London, according to the Oxford English Dictionary; it is believed to be derived from the Greek word χρόνιος (chronios), meaning 'long term'.

== Concept ==
Government officials are particularly susceptible to accusations of cronyism, as they spend taxpayers' money. Many democratic governments are encouraged to practice administrative transparency in accounting and contracting, but there often is no clear delineation of when an appointment to government office is "cronyism".

In the private sector, cronyism exists in organizations, often termed "the old boys' club" or "the golden circle"; again, the boundary between cronyism and "networking" is difficult to delineate.

Cronyism describes relationships existing among mutual acquaintances in private organizations where business, business information, and social interaction are exchanged among influential personnel. This is termed crony capitalism, and is an ethical breach of the principles of the market economy; in advanced economies, crony capitalism is a breach of market regulations.

The economic and social costs of cronyism are paid by society. Those costs are in the form of reduced business opportunity for the majority of the population, reduced competition in the marketplace, inflated consumer goods prices, decreased economic performance, inefficient business investment cycles, reduced motivation in affected organizations, and the diminution of economically productive activity.

== See also ==
- Cartel
- Cronies of Ferdinand Marcos
- Crony capitalism
- Crony-capitalism index
- In-group favoritism
- Interest group
- Nepotism
