= The Third Pillar =

2019 economics book by Raghuram Rajan

The Third Pillar: How the State and Markets Are Leaving Communities Behind
- Author: Raghuram Rajan
- Language: English
- Publisher: Harper Collins India
- Publication date: 26 February 2019
- Publication place: India
- Media type: Print (hardback)
- Pages: 434
- Awards: Financial Times and Goldman Sachs Business Book of the Year 2019
- ISBN: 978-9353028398

The Third Pillar: How the State and Markets Are Leaving Communities Behind is a non-fiction book authored by economist and former Governor of the Reserve Bank of India, Raghuram Rajan published by HarperCollins India on February 26, 2019.

This book is divided into three parts. Part 1 provides a historical narrative on the evolution of the three pillars of society. It begins with a discussion on feudal society in medieval Europe, tracing developments in society till the Great Depression. Part 2 of the book examines the interaction between the three pillars against the backdrop of the Second World War and the Information and Communications Technology (ICT) revolution. Rajan also briefly touches upon the imbalances building up in the two fastest growing large economies: China and India. In the final part of the book, he proposes solutions to restore equilibrium and balance in the three pillars.

== Critical reception ==
Oren Cass of The New York Times wrote "Rajan’s real aim seems to be movement “toward one borderless world,” with stronger communities a perhaps helpful means to that end". Pulapre Balakrishnan of The Hindu wrote "The author appears to invest the community with a virtue that may be too much for it to live up to". Edward Glaeser of The Wall Street Journal wrote "Certainly, we should try the experiment. And as local governments get to work, they could certainly use the help of more thinkers of Mr. Rajan’s caliber". A Reviewer of The Financial Express wrote "That would only bring the politician in to agitate against acquisitions that are deemed arbitrary in the court of public opinion". Aram Bakshian Jr. of The Washington Times wrote "Without the firm foundation of healthy families, all three pillars are doomed to topple". Ashok Desai of Indian Express Limited wrote "It is more like a lost explorer’s wanderings in a jungle looking for an elixir. If one is focused on an elixir, one will not find this book a perfect guide. But if one enjoys getting lost in this particular jungle, this book is a fascinating companion". Peter Thal Larsen of Reuters wrote "In less skilled hands, such a sweeping analysis could quickly tip into banality. Yet Rajan underpins his argument by taking a local perspective".

== Awards ==
- Short listed for the 2019 Financial Times and McKinsey Business Book of the Year Award.
