= Fault Lines: How Hidden Fractures Still Threaten the World Economy =

2010 book by Raghuram Rajan

- Author: Raghuram Rajan
- Language: English
- Subject: Economics
- Genre: Non-fiction
- Publisher: Princeton University Press
- Publication date: 1 May 2010
- Media type: Print (hardcover)
- Pages: 260
- Awards: Financial Times and Goldman Sachs Business Book of the Year 2010
- ISBN: 0691146837

Fault Lines: How Hidden Fractures Still Threaten the World Economy is a 2010 book by Indian economist Raghuram Rajan on the underlying causes of the 2008 financial crisis, and the structural weaknesses present in the world economy. It won the Financial Times and McKinsey Business Book of the Year award in 2010.

== Background ==
Rajan was one of the earliest economists to draw attention to the possibility of an impending financial crisis. The Jackson Hole Conference, organised every year by the Federal Reserve Bank of Kansas City at Jackson Hole, Wyoming, is one of the longest-standing central banking conferences in the world. It brings together participants from both the public and the private sectors to discuss long-term policy issues in banking. The 2005 conference was to be the last for the Federal Reserve Chairman, Alan Greenspan, and the theme was the legacy of the Greenspan era. Rajan presented a paper titled "Has Financial Development Made the World Riskier?" which argued that banks had become more exposed to risk over the previous decade owing to skewed incentives that drove bankers to take on more complex forms of risk. While Rajan received extensive criticism at the time, the eventual collapse of financial markets in 2008 led to his views being seen as prescient.

== Summary ==
Rajan’s analysis of the roots of the 2008 financial crisis focuses on three fundamental stresses: widening income inequality in the US, trade imbalances in the global economy arising out of historical trajectories followed by late-developing countries, and the clash between arm’s length financial systems, as present in the US and Britain, and relationship-based financial systems, as present in China and Japan.

=== Income inequality in the US ===
Rajan illustrates his thesis with regard to widening income inequality by directing attention to the growing disparity in wages, the most important constituent of incomes in the US, across the general population. The wages of a person at the 90th-percentile – that is, a person earning more than 90 percent of the general population – increased by about 65 percent more than one at the 10th-percentile over the thirty-year period from 1975 to 2005. A multitude of factors, such as widespread deregulation and the consequent increases in competition, changes in tax rates, reduced unionisation, and increase in immigration, played a part in widening income inequality. The most important reason, however, was the gap between the supply and demand of skilled workers arising out of deficiencies in education. While politicians understood this, they realised it would be hard to improve the quality of education in a short span of time. Growing inequality also led to greater polarity in the political establishment, reducing the possibility of politicians across party lines coming together on matters of taxation and redistribution. And therefore succeeding administrations resorted to easing access to credit, specifically in the form of housing credit.

Political pressure to broaden access to housing credit and home ownership distorted lending in the financial sector, with both government-sponsored agencies, such as Fannie Mae and Freddie Mac, as well as banks directing money into low-income housing. As the housing agencies bought subprime mortgage-backed securities in large quantities, these created perverse incentives for brokers to originate loans without investigating borrowers’ creditworthiness. Initially these issues were masked by rising house prices and low default rates. As house prices kept rising between 1999 and 2007, households borrowed against existing home equity. Eventually, when prices stopped rising, a large number of borrowers were forced to default. This led to the Subprime mortgage crisis which in turn precipitated the wider 2008 financial crisis.

=== Trade imbalances ===
Late-developing economies, especially those that became independent after World War II, pursued a policy of export-led growth. Typically, national savings were directed through a state-controlled financial system to a small set of favoured firms. Governments protected their domestic market from foreign imports through erecting entry barriers in the form of high tariffs and import restrictions. They also provided incentives to domestic firms for being export-oriented, while doling out tax breaks and subsidies to support their development. Low household demand, historical government policies, and vested domestic interests kept traditional exporters strongly dependent on exports, and reliant on international demand for growth. The surpluses put out by these countries in the global goods market were absorbed by developing countries. In the process, these developing countries ran trade deficits, their spending financed by foreign-debt.

Following the financial crises of the 1990s, these countries sought to generate trade surpluses rather than simply being export oriented. This allowed them to also build foreign-exchange reserves. In order to invest these reserves, the exporters needed a country whose spending outstripped domestic production, along with a strong financial system that was both capable of attracting inflows as well as ensuring the safety of these investments. A large part of these reserves came to be invested in the United States.

=== The clash of systems ===
With limited financial information in the public domain, the financial systems of late-developing economies relied on long-term business relationships. This made them substantially different from financial systems in developed economies, such as the United States and the United Kingdom, where transparency and easy enforceability of contracts have led to the formation of arm's length systems. This incompatibility made it extremely risky for late-developing economies to borrow from abroad to support investment and growth. Following the crises of the 1990s, these countries abandoned investment projects and debt-fuelled expansion. From being net importers, they became net exporters of both goods and capital. Following the dot-com crash, when investments by industrial-country firms collapsed, it was left to the United States to stimulate growth.

== Reception ==
Financial Times columnist Clive Crook wrote that Rajan "runs through the familiar narrative, discussing the usual suspects" in the context of the 2008 financial crisis, "but puts them in a bigger, encompassing frame", describing the book as "clear and accessible, but not relaxing; or encouraging". The Economist wrote that the book deserved to be "widely read in a time when the tendency to blame everything on catch-all terms like 'globalisation' is gaining ground". Harvard Business School historian Nancy F. Koehn, writing in The New York Times, described the book as "serious and thoughtful", but also noted that "something is missing" from Rajan's analysis, especially "the role of human agency — of effective leadership, employee engagement, public service on the part of concerned citizens newly anxious to play a part in an increasingly interdependent world".

Paul Krugman countered Rajan's central thesis that the government, through encouraging banks to lend to low-income borrowers, was responsible for the crisis, asserting that while the government was not devoid of blame, "its sins were more of omission than commission". He criticized Rajan, claiming that "it is clear that Democrats are largely to blame in his worldview," and that "Rajan’s endorsement of the conservative story line, without even an acknowledgment of the problems of that line, comes across as slippery and evasive". Reviewing the book in The New York Review of Books, he wrote:

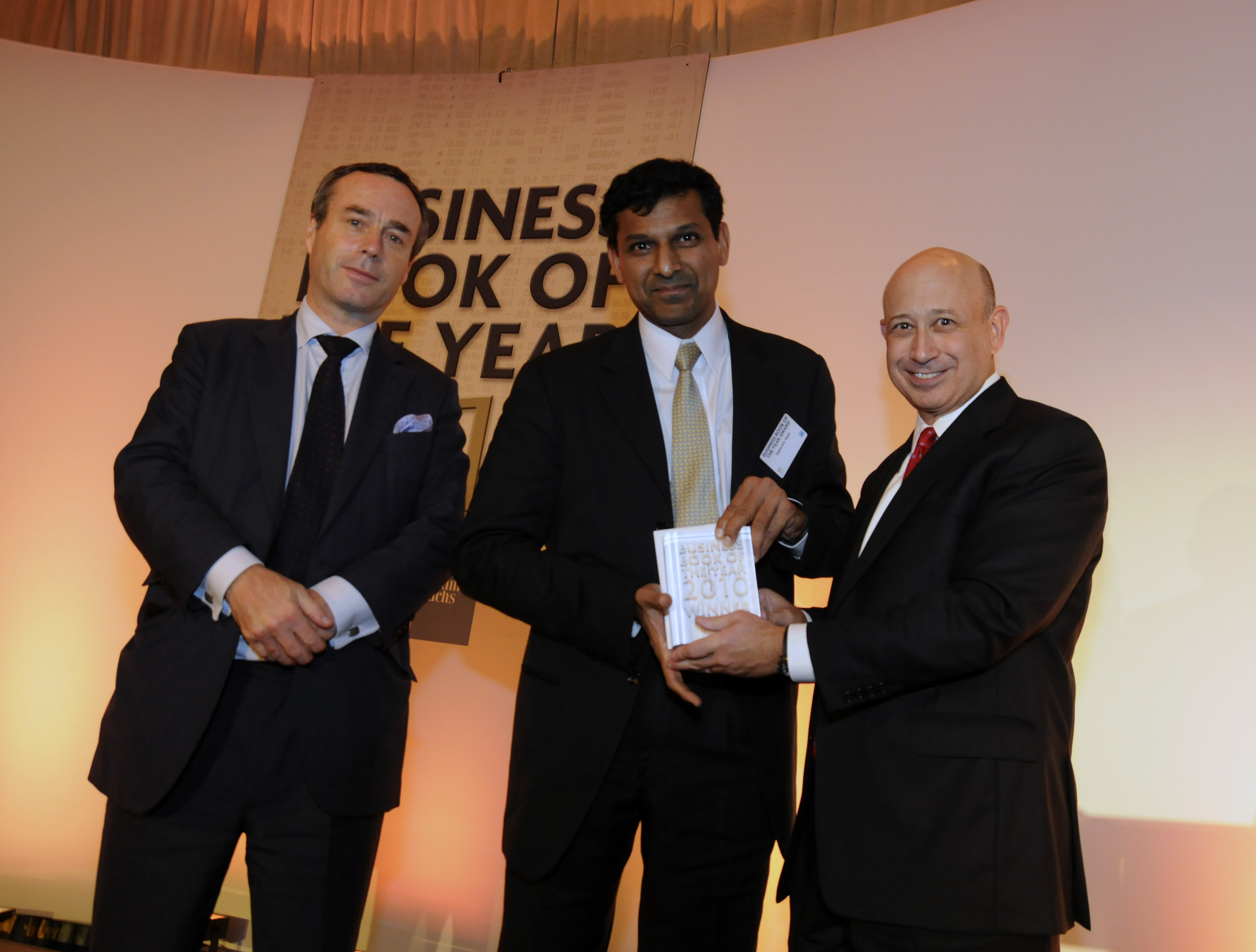
Rajan, with Lionel Barber (left) and Lloyd Blankfein (right), at the Financial Times and Goldman Sachs Business Book of the Year Award ceremony in 2010.

While it’s a story that ties everything up in one neat package, however, it’s strongly at odds with the evidence. And it’s disappointing to see Rajan, a widely respected economist who was among the first to warn about a runaway Wall Street, buy into what is mainly a politically motivated myth. Rajan’s book relies heavily on studies from the American Enterprise Institute, a right-wing think tank; he doesn’t mention any of the many studies and commentaries debunking the government-did-it thesis.

The book was shortlisted for the Financial Times and Goldman Sachs Business Book of the Year Award in 2010, the award having been set up to recognize the book that provides "the most compelling and enjoyable insight into modern business issues." The other shortlisted titles were The Art of Choosing, The Facebook Effect, The Big Short, More Money Than God, and Too Big to Fail. It won the £30,000 prize amidst strong competition.

Financial Times editor Lionel Barber called the book "a comprehensive analysis of what went wrong", stating that "Rajan offers insights into how to correct the flaws in financial capitalism and illuminates difficult choices in public policy". Goldman Sachs CEO Lloyd Blankfein called it "a profound, compelling book", noting that Rajan's "analysis of what went wrong, and what needs to be done to address the structural flaws that caused the financial crisis, should be essential reading for policy makers and practitioners alike".

== Awards and honours ==
- 2010 Financial Times and McKinsey Business Book of the Year Award
- 2010 PROSE Award in Economics
- 2011 Gold Medal in Finance/Investment/Economics, Independent Publisher Book Awards

== Bibliography ==
- Rajan, Raghuram G. (28 August 2011). Fault Lines: How Hidden Fractures Still Threaten the World Economy. Princeton University Press. ISBN 978-0-691-15263-9.
