= Deepak Mohanty =

Former Chairman of Pension Regulatory Authority of India

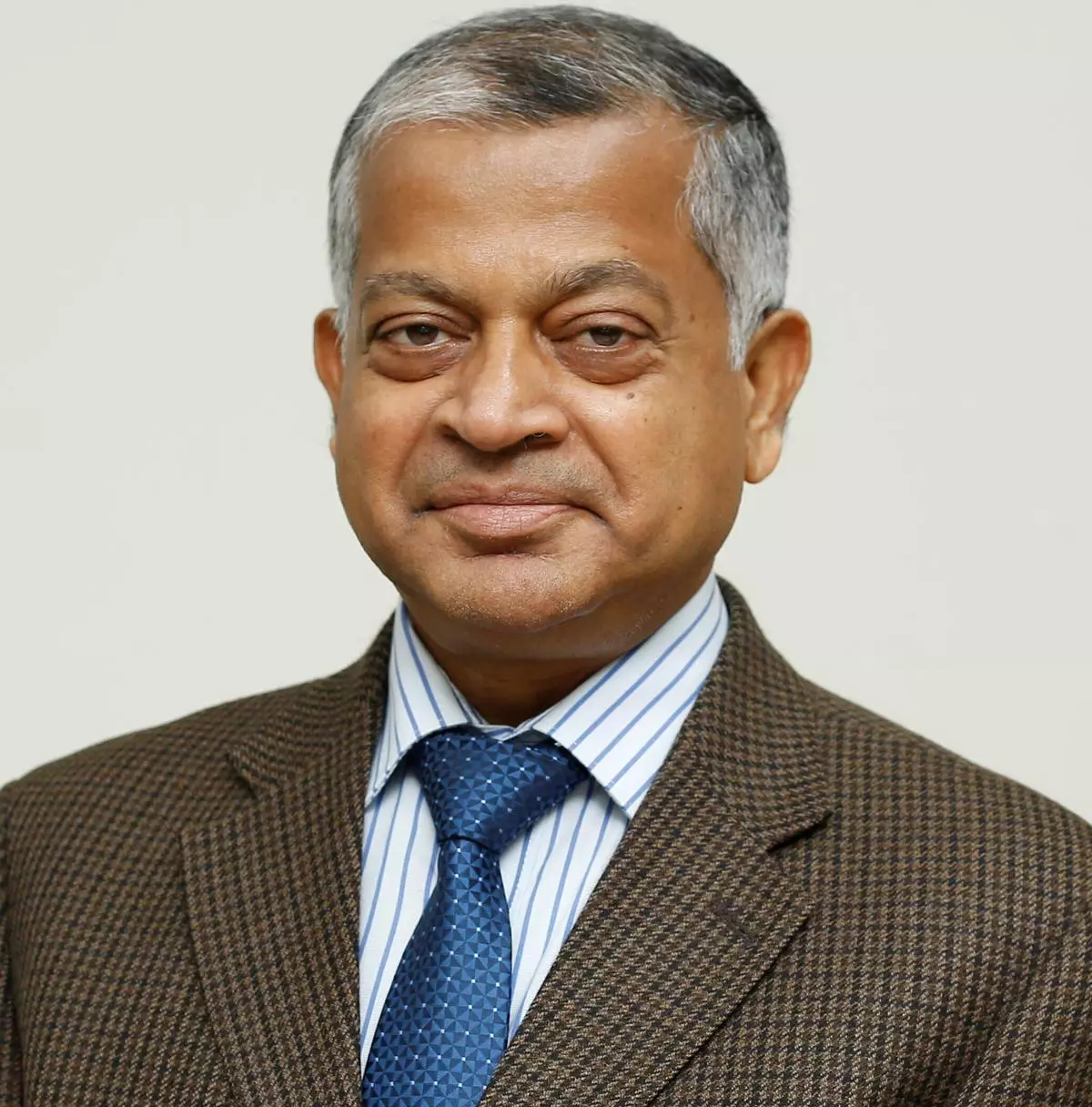
- Born: 1960 (age 65–66) (India)

Academic background
- Education: (BS) Ravenshaw University (MS) Yale University (PhD) Gokhale Institute of Politics and Economics

Academic work
- Institutions: PFRDA

Deepak Mohanty (born 1960) is an Indian economist. He served as Chairman of the Pension Fund Regulatory and Development Authority(PFRDA) from March 2023 till May 2025. He was Chief Economic Advisor, Federation of Indian Chambers of Commerce and Industry (FICCI) and was an independent Director on a few companies’ Boards. Prior to that, Dr. Mohanty was Whole Time Member, PFRDA.

== Education ==
He graduated with a bachelor's degree in physics with honors from Ravenshaw College, Cuttack, in 1979, before going to Jawaharlal Nehru University for his master's degree. He also holds a master's degree in economics from Yale University. He holds a doctorate degree in economics from Gokhale Institute of Politics and Economics.

== Career ==
He served as executive director of the Reserve Bank of India (RBI). The areas supervised by him were monetary policy, economic research, statistics, financial stability, enforcement of banking regulation, risk management and internal audit & inspection. He had also worked in various positions in economic research and was head of monetary policy department of the RBI.

He served in the International Monetary Fund (IMF) as senior adviser.

He has presided over a few committees in RBI for suggesting various policy changes by the central bank. In one such committee, he suggested that only the repo rate should be the signalling rate and that the monetary system should almost always operate in a deficit. One other big suggestion he made is that the government's surplus cash deposited with the RBI should be auctioned so that there is no lead and lag in liquidity.

== Works ==
Mohanty edited and contributed to three books of research papers titled Regional Economy of India: Growth and Finance. , Monetary Policy, Sovereign Debt and Financial Stability-The New Trilemma. and Pension Security in India : Progress and Prospects.

He spoke extensively on monetary, financial and social-security issues. He delivered the prestigious Prof. Baidyanath Misra Endowment Lecture of the Orissa Economics Association, in 2010.
