= Crony capitalism =

Capitalism featuring undue alliances between business interests and politicians

Crony capitalism, sometimes also called simply cronyism, is a pejorative term used in political discourse to describe a situation in which businesses profit from a close relationship with state power, either through an anti-competitive regulatory environment, direct government largesse, or corruption, often at the expense of the working class. Examples given for crony capitalism include the obtainment of permits, government grants, tax breaks, or other undue influence from businesses over the state's deployment of public goods, for example, mining concessions for primary commodities or contracts for public works. In other words, it is used to describe a situation where businesses thrive not as a result of free enterprise, but rather collusion between the business class and the political class.

Wealth is then accumulated not merely by making a profit in the market, but through profiteering by rent seeking using this monopoly or oligopoly. Entrepreneurship and innovative practices that seek to reward risk are stifled since the value-added is little by crony businesses, as hardly anything of significant value is created by them, with transactions taking the form of trading. Crony capitalism spills over into the government, the politics, and the media, when this nexus distorts the economy and affects society to an extent it corrupts public-serving economic, political, and social ideals.

== Historical usage ==
The first extensive use of the term "crony capitalism" came about in the 1980s to characterize the Philippine economy under the dictatorship of Ferdinand Marcos. Early uses of this term to describe the economic practices of the Marcos regime included that of Ricardo Manapat, who introduced it in his 1979 pamphlet "Some are Smarter than Others", which was later published in 1991; former Time magazine business editor George M. Taber, who used the term in a Time magazine article in 1980, and activist (and later Finance Minister) Jaime Ongpin, who used the term extensively in his writing and is sometimes credited for having coined it.

The term crony capitalism made a significant impact on the public as an explanation of the Asian financial crisis.

It is also used to describe governmental decisions favoring cronies of governmental officials.

The term is used largely interchangeably with the related term corporate welfare, although the latter is by definition specific to corporations.

== In practice ==
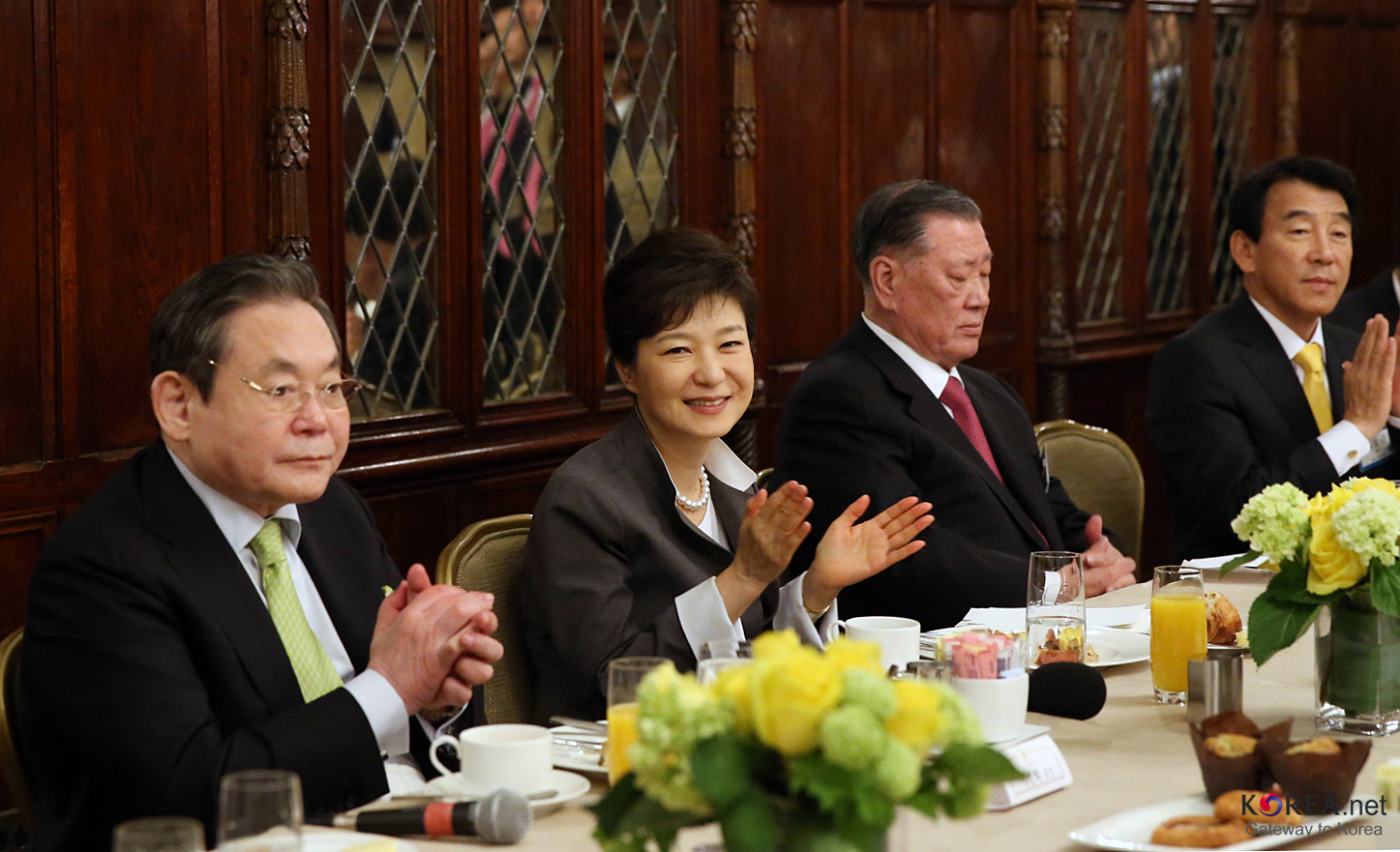
South Korean President Park Geun-hye at a breakfast meeting with business magnates Lee Kun-hee and Chung Mong-koo. A group of massive, mostly family-run business conglomerates, called chaebol, dominates South Korea's economy.

Crony capitalism exists along a continuum. In its lightest form, crony capitalism consists of collusion among market players, which is officially tolerated or encouraged by the government. While perhaps lightly competing against each other, they will present a unified front (sometimes called a trade association or industry trade group) to the government in requesting subsidies, aid or regulation. For instance, newcomers to a market then need to surmount significant barriers to entry in seeking loans, acquiring shelf space, or receiving official sanction. Some such systems are very formalized, such as sports leagues and the Medallion System of the taxicabs of New York City, but often the process is more subtle, such as expanding training and certification exams to make it more expensive for new entrants to enter a market and thereby limiting potential competition. In technological fields, there a system may evolve whereby new entrants may be accused of infringing on patents that the established competitors never assert against each other. In spite of this, some competitors may succeed when the legal barriers are light. The term crony capitalism is generally used when these practices either come to dominate the economy as a whole or come to dominate the most valuable industries in an economy. Intentionally ambiguous laws and regulations are common in such systems. Taken strictly, such laws would greatly impede practically all business activity, but in practice, they are only erratically enforced. The specter of having such laws suddenly brought down upon a business provides an incentive to stay in the good graces of political officials. Troublesome rivals who have overstepped their bounds can have these laws suddenly enforced against them, leading to fines or even jail time. Even in high-income democracies with well-established legal systems and freedom of the press in place, a larger state is generally associated with increased political corruption.

The term crony capitalism was initially applied to states involved in the 1997 Asian financial crisis, such as Indonesia, South Korea and Thailand. In these cases, the term was used to point out how family members of the ruling leaders became extremely wealthy with no non-political justification. Southeast Asian nations, such as Hong Kong and Malaysia, still score very poorly in rankings measuring this. It was also used in this context as part of a broader liberal critique of economic dirigisme. The term has also been applied to the system of oligarchs in Russia. Other states to which the term has been applied include India, in particular the system after the 1990s liberalization, whereby land and other resources were given at throwaway prices in the name of public-private partnerships, the more recent coal-gate scam and cheap allocation of land and resources to Adani SEZ under the Congress and BJP governments. Similar references to crony capitalism have been made to other countries, such as Argentina and Greece. Wu Jinglian, one of China's leading economists and a longtime advocate of its transition to free markets, says that it faces two starkly contrasting futures, namely a market economy under the rule of law or crony capitalism. A dozen years later, prominent political scientist Pei Minxin concluded that the latter course had become deeply embedded in China. The anti-corruption campaign under Xi Jinping (2012–) has seen more than 100,000 high- and low-ranking Chinese officials indicted and jailed.

Many prosperous nations have also had varying amounts of cronyism throughout their history, including the United Kingdom, especially in the 1600s and 1700s, the United States and Japan.

=== Crony capitalism index ===
The Economist benchmarks countries based on a crony-capitalism index calculated via how much economic activity occurs in industries prone to cronyism. Its 2014 Crony Capitalism Index ranking listed Hong Kong, Russia and Malaysia in the top three spots.

== In finance ==
Crony capitalism in finance was found in the Second Bank of the United States. It was a private company, but its largest stockholder was the federal government, which owned 20%. It was an early bank regulator and grew to be one of the most powerful organizations in the country due largely to being the depository of the government's revenue.

The Gramm–Leach–Bliley Act in 1999 completely removed Glass–Steagall's separation between commercial banks and investment banks. After this repeal, commercial banks, investment banks and insurance companies combined their lobbying efforts. Critics claim this was instrumental in the passage of the Bankruptcy Abuse Prevention and Consumer Protection Act of 2005.

== In sections of an economy ==
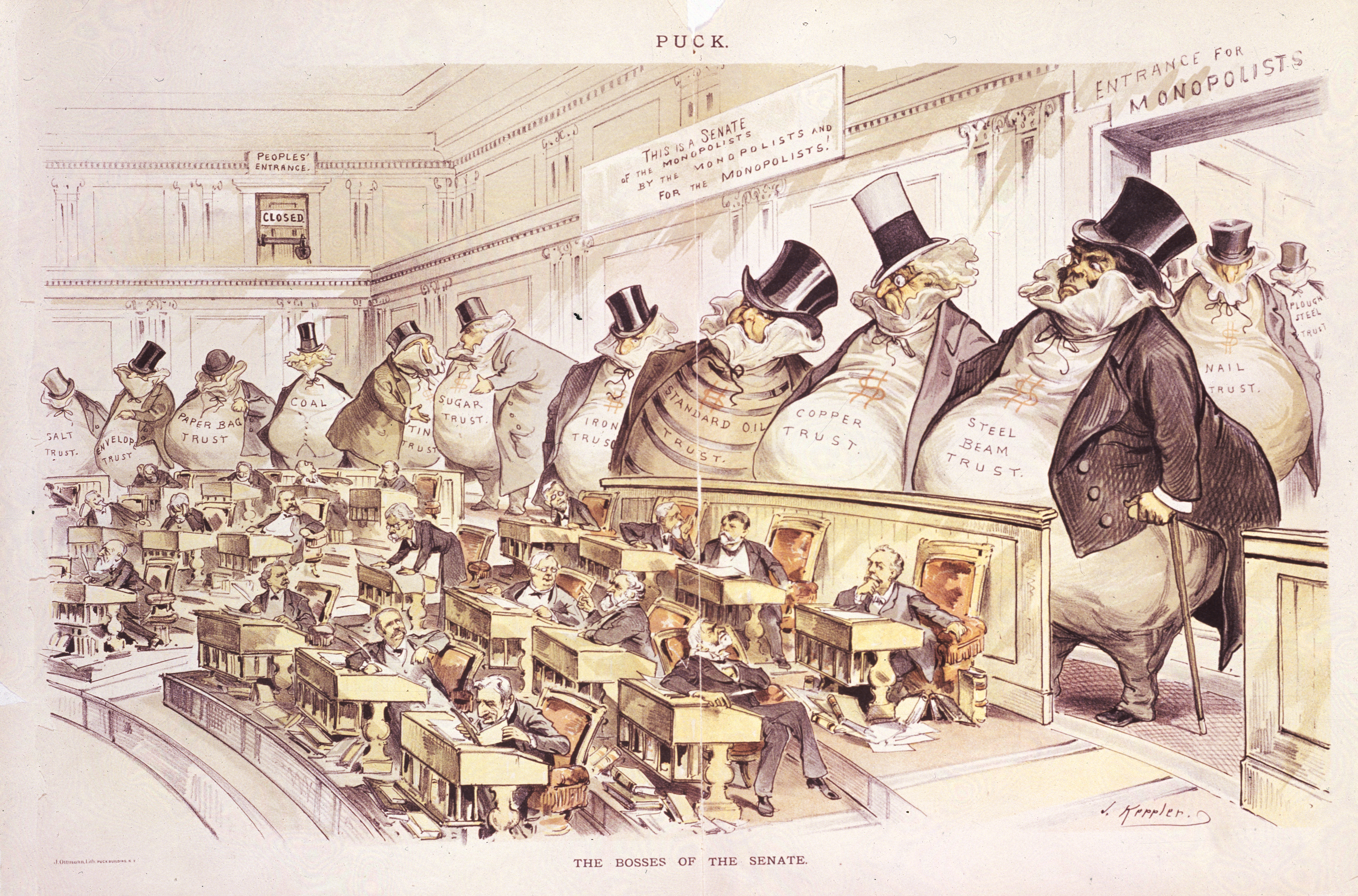
"The Bosses of the Senate", corporate interests as giant money bags looming over U.S. senators

More direct government involvement in a specific sector can also lead to specific areas of crony capitalism, even if the economy as a whole may be competitive. This is most common in natural resource sectors through the granting of mining or drilling concessions, but it is also possible through a process known as regulatory capture, where the government agencies in charge of regulating an industry come to be controlled by that industry. Governments will often establish, in good faith, government agencies to regulate an industry. However, the members of an industry have a very strong interest in the actions of that regulatory body, while the rest of the citizenry are only lightly affected. As a result, it is not uncommon for current industry players to gain control of the watchdog and use it against competitors. This typically takes the form of making it very expensive for a new entrant to enter the market. An 1824 landmark United States Supreme Court ruling overturned a New York State-granted monopoly ("a veritable model of state munificence" facilitated by Robert R. Livingston, one of the Founding Fathers) for the then-revolutionary technology of steamboats. Leveraging the Supreme Court's establishment of Congressional supremacy over commerce, the Interstate Commerce Commission was established in 1887 with the intent of regulating railroad robber barons. President Grover Cleveland appointed Thomas M. Cooley, a railroad ally, as its first chairman and a permit system was used to deny access to new entrants and legalize price fixing.

The defense industry in the United States is often described as an example of crony capitalism. Connections with the Pentagon and lobbyists in Washington are described by critics as more important than actual competition due to the political and secretive nature of defense contracts. In the Airbus-Boeing WTO dispute, Airbus (which receives subsidies from European governments) has stated Boeing receives similar subsidies, which are hidden as inefficient defense contracts and in the form of federal tax breaks. Other American defense companies were put under scrutiny for no-bid contracts for the Iraq War and Hurricane Katrina-related contracts, purportedly due to having cronies in the Bush administration.

Gerald P. O'Driscoll, former vice president at the Federal Reserve Bank of Dallas, stated that Fannie Mae and Freddie Mac became examples of crony capitalism as government backing let Fannie and Freddie dominate mortgage underwriting, saying: "The politicians created the mortgage giants, which then returned some of the profits to the pols—sometimes directly, as campaign funds; sometimes as "contributions" to favored constituents".

== In developing economies ==
In its worst form, crony capitalism can devolve into simple corruption where any pretense of a free market is dispensed with, bribes to government officials are considered de rigueur and tax evasion is common. This is seen in many parts of Africa and is sometimes called plutocracy (rule by wealth) or kleptocracy (rule by theft). Kenyan economist David Ndii has repeatedly brought to light how this system has manifested over time, occasioned by the reign of Uhuru Kenyatta as president.

Corrupt governments may favor one set of business owners who have close ties to the government over others. This may also be done with religious or ethnic favoritism. For instance, Alawites in Syria have a disproportionate share of power in the government and business there (then-President Assad himself is an Alawite). This can be explained by considering personal relationships as a social network. As government and business leaders try to accomplish various things, they naturally turn to other powerful people for support in their endeavors. These people form hubs in the network. In a developing country, those hubs may be very few, thus concentrating economic and political power in a small interlocking group.

Normally, this will be untenable to maintain in business as new entrants will affect the market. However, if business and government are entwined, then the government can maintain the small-hub network.

Raymond Vernon, a specialist in economics and international affairs, wrote that the Industrial Revolution began in Great Britain because they were the first to successfully limit the power of veto groups (typically cronies of those with power in government) to block innovations, writing: "Unlike most other national environments, the British environment of the early 19th century contained relatively few threats to those who improved and applied existing inventions, whether from business competitors, labor, or the government itself. In other European countries, by contrast, the merchant guilds ... were a pervasive source of veto for many centuries. This power was typically bestowed upon them by the government." Vernon further stated that "a steam-powered horseless carriage produced in France in 1769 was officially suppressed." James Watt began experimenting with steam in 1763, got a patent in 1769 and began commercial production in 1775.

Raghuram Rajan, former governor of the Reserve Bank of India, has said: "One of the greatest dangers to the growth of developing countries is the middle income trap, where crony capitalism creates oligarchies that slow down growth. If the debate during the elections is any pointer, this is a very real concern of the public in India today". Tavleen Singh, columnist for The Indian Express, has disagreed. According to Singh, India's corporate success is not a product of crony capitalism, but rather because India is no longer under the influence of crony socialism.

A 2021 article for Socio-Economic Review concluded that neoliberal policies in the context of globalization and IMF influence fueled corruption and paved the way for the development of crony capitalism in developing economies.

== Political viewpoints ==
While the problem is generally accepted across the political spectrum, ideology shades the view of the problem's causes and therefore its solutions. Political views mostly fall into two camps, which might be called the socialist and capitalist critique. The socialist position is that crony capitalism is the inevitable result of any strictly capitalist system and thus, broadly democratic government must regulate economic or wealthy interests to restrict monopoly. The capitalist position is that natural monopolies are rare; therefore, governmental regulations generally abet established wealthy interests by restricting competition.

=== Socialist critique ===
Critics of crony capitalism, including socialists and anti-capitalists, often assert that so-called crony capitalism is simply the inevitable result of any strictly capitalist system. Jane Jacobs described it as a natural consequence of collusion between those managing power and trade, while Noam Chomsky has argued that the word crony is superfluous when describing capitalism. Since businesses make money and money leads to political power, business will inevitably use their power to influence governments. Much of the impetus behind campaign finance reform in the United States and in other countries is an attempt to prevent economic power from being used to take political power.

Ravi Batra argues that "all official economic measures adopted since 1981 ... have devastated the middle class" and that the Occupy Wall Street movement should push for their repeal and thus end the influence of the super wealthy in the political process, which he considers a manifestation of crony capitalism. According to Marie Gottschalk, an outbreak of crony capitalism that flourished during the neoliberal era and escalated following the Great Recession has perpetuated "enormous structural violence in the United States as poverty, economic inequality, homelessness, and drug overdoses soared; wages stagnated; life expectancy plummeted; and the so-called social safety net was shredded even further."

Socialist economists, such as Robin Hahnel, have criticized the term as an ideologically motivated attempt to cast what is in their view the fundamental problems of capitalism as avoidable irregularities. Socialist economists dismiss the term as an apologetic for failures of neoliberal policy and, more fundamentally, their perception of the weaknesses of market allocation.

=== Capitalist critique ===
Supporters of capitalism also generally oppose crony capitalism. Further, supporters such as classical liberals, neoliberals and right-libertarians consider it an aberration brought on by governmental favors incompatible with the free market. In the capitalist view, cronyism is the result of an excess of interference in the market, which inevitably will result in a toxic combination of corporations and government officials running sectors of the economy. For instance, the Financial Times observed that, in Vietnam during the 2010s, the primary beneficiaries of cronyism were Communist party officials, noting also the "common practice of employing only party members and their family members and associates to government jobs or to jobs in state-owned enterprises."

Conservative commentator Ben Shapiro prefers to equate this problem with terms such as corporatocracy or corporatism, considered "a modern form of mercantilism", to emphasize that the only way to run a profitable business in such a system is to have help from corrupt government officials. Likewise, Hernando de Soto said that mercantilism "is also known as 'crony' or 'noninclusive' capitalism".

Even if the initial regulation was well-intentioned (to curb actual abuses) and even if the initial lobbying by corporations was well-intentioned (to reduce illogical regulations), the mixture of business and government stifles competition, a collusive result called regulatory capture. Burton W. Folsom Jr. distinguishes those who engage in crony capitalism—designated by him as political entrepreneurs—from those who compete in the marketplace without special aid from the government, whom he calls market entrepreneurs. While market entrepreneurs such as James J. Hill, Cornelius Vanderbilt and John D. Rockefeller succeeded by producing a quality product at a competitive price, political entrepreneurs such as Edward Collins in steamships and the leaders of the Union Pacific Railroad in railroads were men who used the power of government to succeed. They tried to gain subsidies or, in some way, use the government to stop competitors.

== See also ==
- Actually existing capitalism
- Corporate capitalism
- Corporatocracy
- Cronyism
- Cronies of Ferdinand Marcos
- Economic History of the Philippines under Ferdinand Marcos
- Government failure
- Government-owned corporation
- Inverted totalitarianism
- Iron triangle (US politics)
- Licence Raj (concept in Indian political-economics)
- Mercantilism
- Patrimonialism
- Political capitalism
- Political family
- Political machine
- Regulatory capture
- Rent-seeking
- Socialism for the rich and capitalism for the poor
- State capture
- State monopoly capitalism
- Supercapitalism
- Zhao family
