= Raghuram Rajan =

Indian economist and former governor of Reserve Bank of India

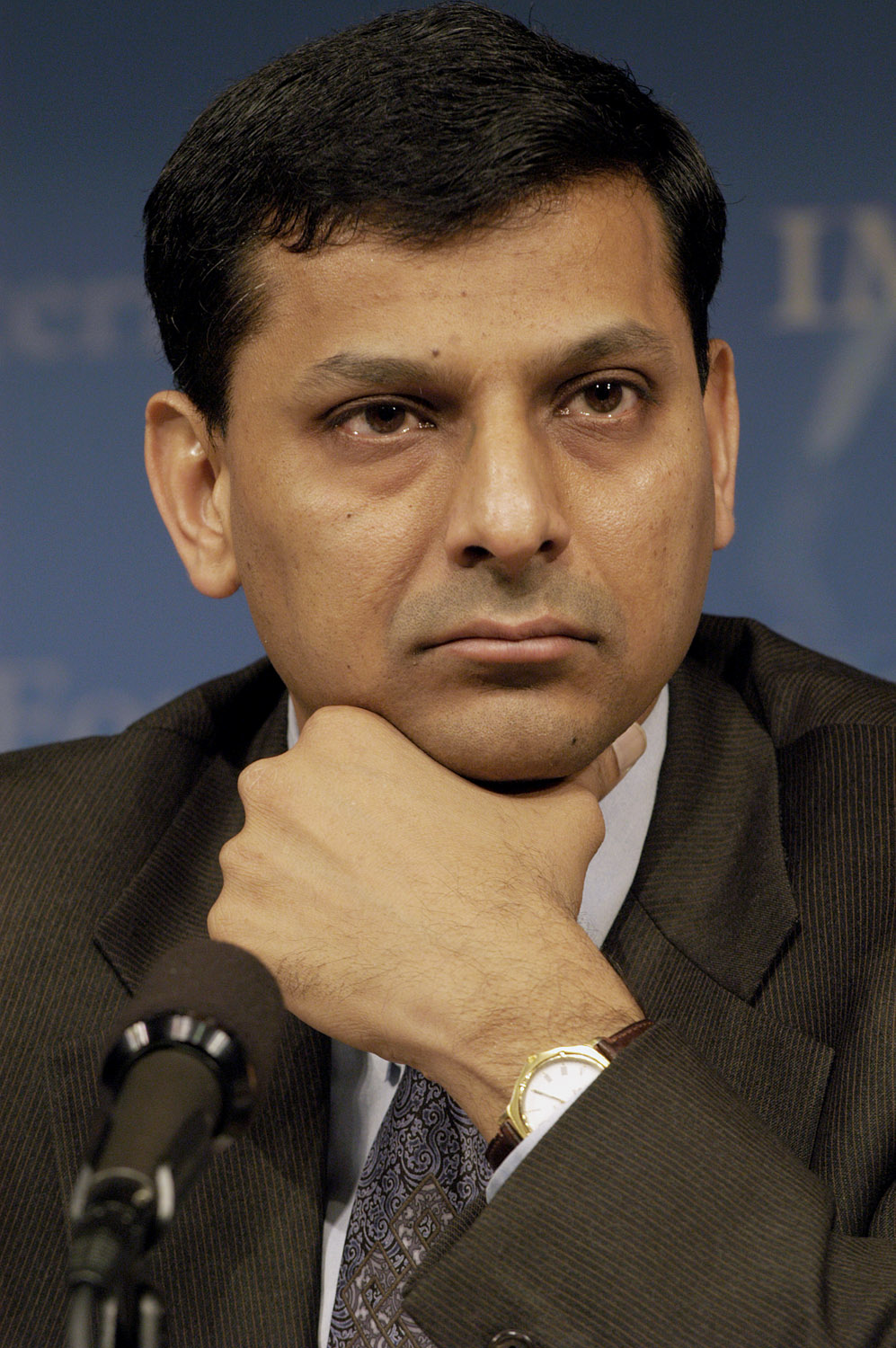
- Rajan in 2004

23rd Governor of the Reserve Bank of India
- In office 4 September 2013 – 4 September 2016
- Prime Minister: Manmohan Singh; Narendra Modi
- Preceded by: Duvvuri Subbarao
- Succeeded by: Urjit Patel

15th Chief Economic Adviser to the Government of India
- In office 10 August 2012 – 4 September 2013
- Prime Minister: Manmohan Singh
- Preceded by: Kaushik Basu
- Succeeded by: Arvind Subramanian

7th Chief Economist of the International Monetary Fund
- In office 1 September 2003 – 1 January 2007
- Preceded by: Kenneth Rogoff
- Succeeded by: Simon Johnson

Personal details
- Born: 3 February 1963 (age 63) Bhopal, Madhya Pradesh, India
- Spouse: Radhika Rajan
- Education: Indian Institute of Technology Delhi (BTech); Indian Institute of Management Ahmedabad (PGDM); Massachusetts Institute of Technology (PhD)

Raghuram Govind Rajan (born 3 February 1963) is an Indian economist and former central banker. He has been the Katherine Dusak Miller Distinguished Service Professor of Finance at the University of Chicago's Booth School of Business since 2016. He was previously with the university's economics department from 1991 to 2013. Rajan served as the Chief Economist of the International Monetary Fund (IMF) from 2003 to 2006. He oversaw Indian monetary policy as the 23rd Governor of the Reserve Bank of India from 2013 to 2016. During this period, he was appointed Vice-Chairman of the Bank for International Settlements in 2015.

Rajan's early warnings of emerging risks in the global financial system three years before the 2008 worldwide financial crisis received international scrutiny. His views came to be seen as prescient and he was extensively interviewed for the documentary Inside Job (2010). Later that year, he published his debut book on the matter, Fault Lines: How Hidden Fractures Still Threaten the World Economy. He received the Fischer Black Prize in 2003 and was named to Time's 100 most influential people list in 2016. Rajan's academic research is focused on corporate finance, economic development, and financial regulation.

== Early life and education ==
Raghuram Rajan was born on 3 February 1963 in Bhopal, Madhya Pradesh, to a Tamil Iyengar Brahmin family, some metres from where the Gas Tragedy took place.

His father, R. Govindarajan, was posted to Indonesia in 1966 due to his work with the Intelligence Bureau. In 1968, he joined the newly created external intelligence unit, the Research and Analysis Wing (R&AW) where he served as staff officer under R. N. Kao and became part of the "Kaoboys". In 1970, he was posted to Sri Lanka, where political turmoil in the country caused Rajan to miss one year of school. His father was then posted to Belgium, where Rajan attended a French international school. The family returned to India in 1974. Throughout his childhood, Rajan presumed his father to be a diplomat since the family traveled on diplomatic passports. He was a half-term student of Campion School, Bhopal until 1974.

From 1974 to 1981 Rajan attended Delhi Public School, R. K. Puram, In 1981 he enrolled at Indian Institute of Technology, Delhi for a bachelor's degree in electrical engineering. In the final year of his four-year degree, he headed the Student Affairs Council. He graduated in 1985 and was awarded the Director's Gold Medal as the best all-round student. In 1987, he earned a Post Graduate Diploma in Management (equivalent to MBA) from the Indian Institute of Management, Ahmedabad, graduating with a gold medal for academic performance. He joined the Tata Administrative Services as a management trainee, but left after a few months to join the doctoral program at the Sloan School of Management at Massachusetts Institute of Technology.

In 1991, he received a PhD for his thesis titled Essays on Banking under the supervision of Stewart Myers, consisting of three essays on the nature of the relationship between a firm or a country, and its creditor banks. The nature of financial systems had witnessed widespread changes in the 1980s, with markets getting deregulated, information becoming more widely available and easier to process, and competition having increased. The established orthodoxy claimed that deregulation must necessarily increase competition, which would translate into greater efficiency. In his thesis, Rajan argued that this might not necessarily be the case. The first essay focused on the choice available to firms between arm's length credit and relationship-based credit. The second focused on the Glass-Steagall Act, and the conflict of interest involved when a commercial lending bank enters into investment banking. The final essay examined why indexation of a country's debt, despite offering potential advantages, seldom featured in debt reduction plans.

He was awarded an honorary doctorate degree by the London Business School in 2012, the Hong Kong University of Science and Technology in 2015, and the Catholic University of Louvain in 2019.

== Career ==
=== Academic career ===
In 1991, Rajan joined as an assistant professor of finance at the Booth School of Business at the University of Chicago, and became a full professor in 1995. He has taught as a visiting professor at Stockholm School of Economics, Kellogg School of Management, MIT Sloan School of Management, and Indian School of Business.

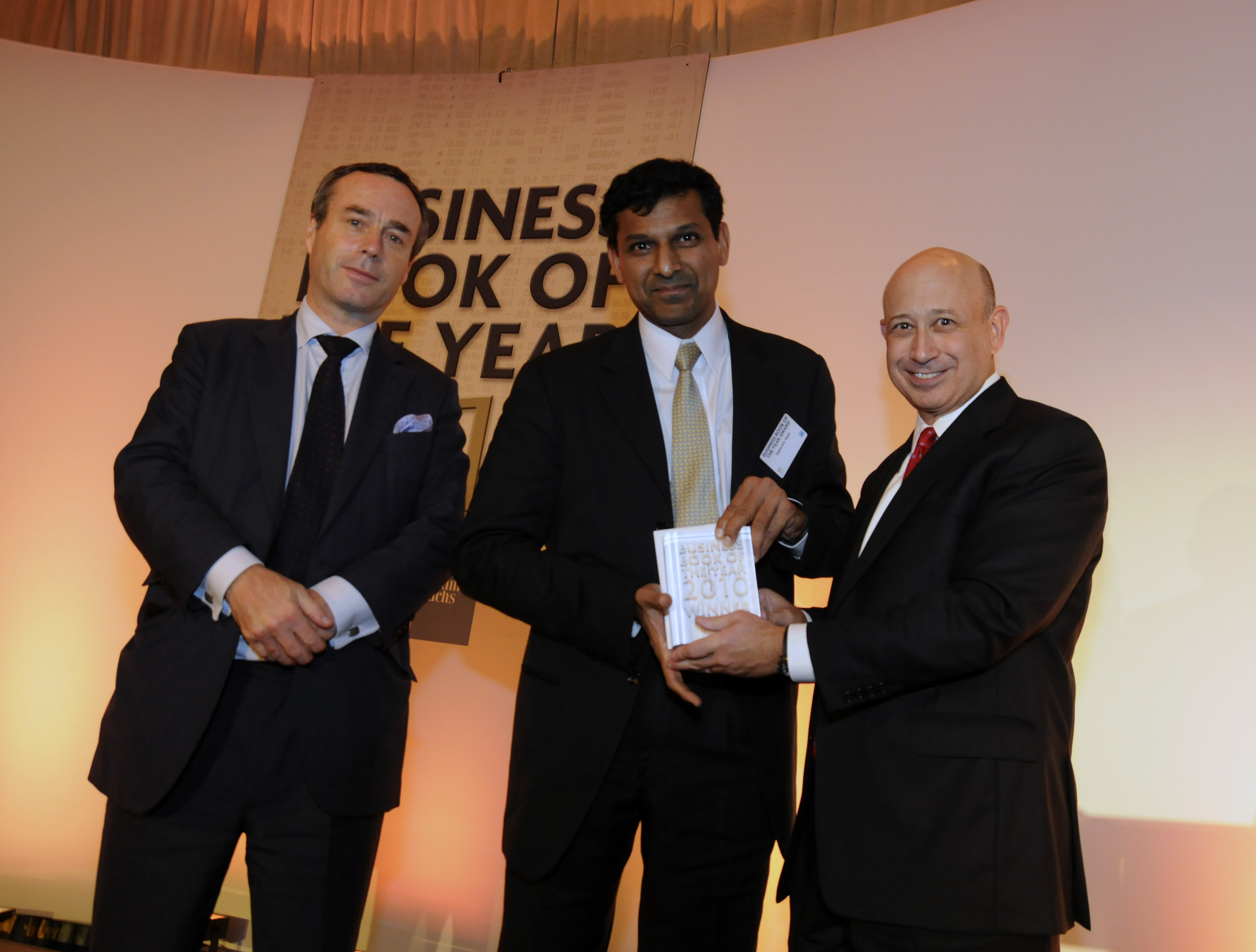
Rajan, with Lionel Barber (left) and Lloyd Blankfein (right), at the FT and Goldman Sachs Business Book of the Year Award ceremony in 2010.

Rajan has written extensively on banking, corporate finance, international finance, growth and development, and organisational structures. He is a regular contributor to Project Syndicate. He has collaborated with Douglas Diamond to produce much-cited work on banks, and their interlinkages with macroeconomic phenomena. He has worked with Luigi Zingales on the effect of institutions on economic growth, their research showing that development of free financial markets is fundamental to economic modernisation. Rajan and Zingales built on their work to publish Saving Capitalism from the Capitalists in 2003. The book argued that entrenched incumbents in closed financial markets stifle competition and reforms, thereby inhibiting economic growth. Rajan's 2010 book Fault Lines: How Hidden Fractures Still Threaten the World Economy examined the fundamental stresses in the American and the global economy that led to the 2008 financial crisis. He argued that widening income inequality in the US, trade imbalances in the global economy, and the clash between arm's length financial systems, were responsible for bringing about the crisis. The book won the Financial Times and Goldman Sachs Business Book of the Year Award.

The Research Papers in Economics project ranks him among the world's most influential economists, featuring him among the top 5% of authors. He was awarded the inaugural 2003 Fischer Black Prize, given biennially by the American Finance Association to the best finance researcher under the age of 40, for his "path-breaking contributions to our knowledge of financial institutions, the workings of the modern corporation, and the causes and consequences of the development of the financial sector across countries."

He became a member of the American Academy of Arts and Sciences in 2009, and served as the president of the American Finance Association in 2011. In April 2025, he was named chair of the Group of Thirty, succeeding Mark Carney. He has served as a founding member of the academic council of the Indian School of Business since 1998.

=== International Monetary Fund ===
After the 1997 Asian financial crisis, the International Monetary Fund was facing criticism for its imposition of fiscal austerity and tighter monetary policies on developing nations. Critics, including Nobel laureate and former chief economist at the World Bank, Joseph Stiglitz, held the IMF's policies responsible for increased economic volatility and destabilisation. While the role of the chief economist had previously always been held by a leading macroeconomist, the IMF wanted to strengthen its financial expertise. American economist Anne Krueger, then the IMF's first deputy managing director, had recently read Rajan's book Saving Capitalism from the Capitalists, and reached out to him to understand if he would be interested. Although Rajan seemed to harbour reservations initially, reportedly telling her, "Well, Anne, I don't know any macroeconomics", he appeared for an interview, and was subsequently appointed. In announcing his appointment, IMF managing director Horst Köhler noted that Rajan's "particular experience in financial sector issues will help strengthen the IMF's role as a centre of excellence in macroeconomic and financial sector stability." At 40, he was the youngest individual, and the first born in an emerging-market nation, to be appointed the chief economist at the IMF. He served in the position from October 2003 to December 2006.

At the IMF, Rajan laid the groundwork for integrating financial sector analysis into the IMF's economic country models. He also led a team to assist some major economies in reducing balance of payments imbalances. During his tenure the Research Department, which Rajan led, contributed to a complete review of the IMF's medium-term strategy, worked on introducing modern modelling and exchange rate assessment techniques to the IMF's consultations with member countries, and analysed the growth and integration of China and India into the world economy. While he largely kept fiscal austerity policies intact, on occasions he also published research that went against the prevailing orthodoxy at the IMF. A 2005 paper, published with Arvind Subramanian, questioned the efficacy of foreign aid, arguing that aid inflows have adverse effects on growth in developing economies. A 2006 paper, published with Eswar Prasad and Arvind Subramanian, concluded that while growth and the extent of foreign financing were positively correlated in industrial countries, non-industrial countries that had relied on foreign finance had grown slower than those that had not.

While he was asked to stay on as the chief economist for a second term, Rajan left after one term as the University of Chicago indicated that his leave could not be extended.

=== Economic Advisor to Government of India ===
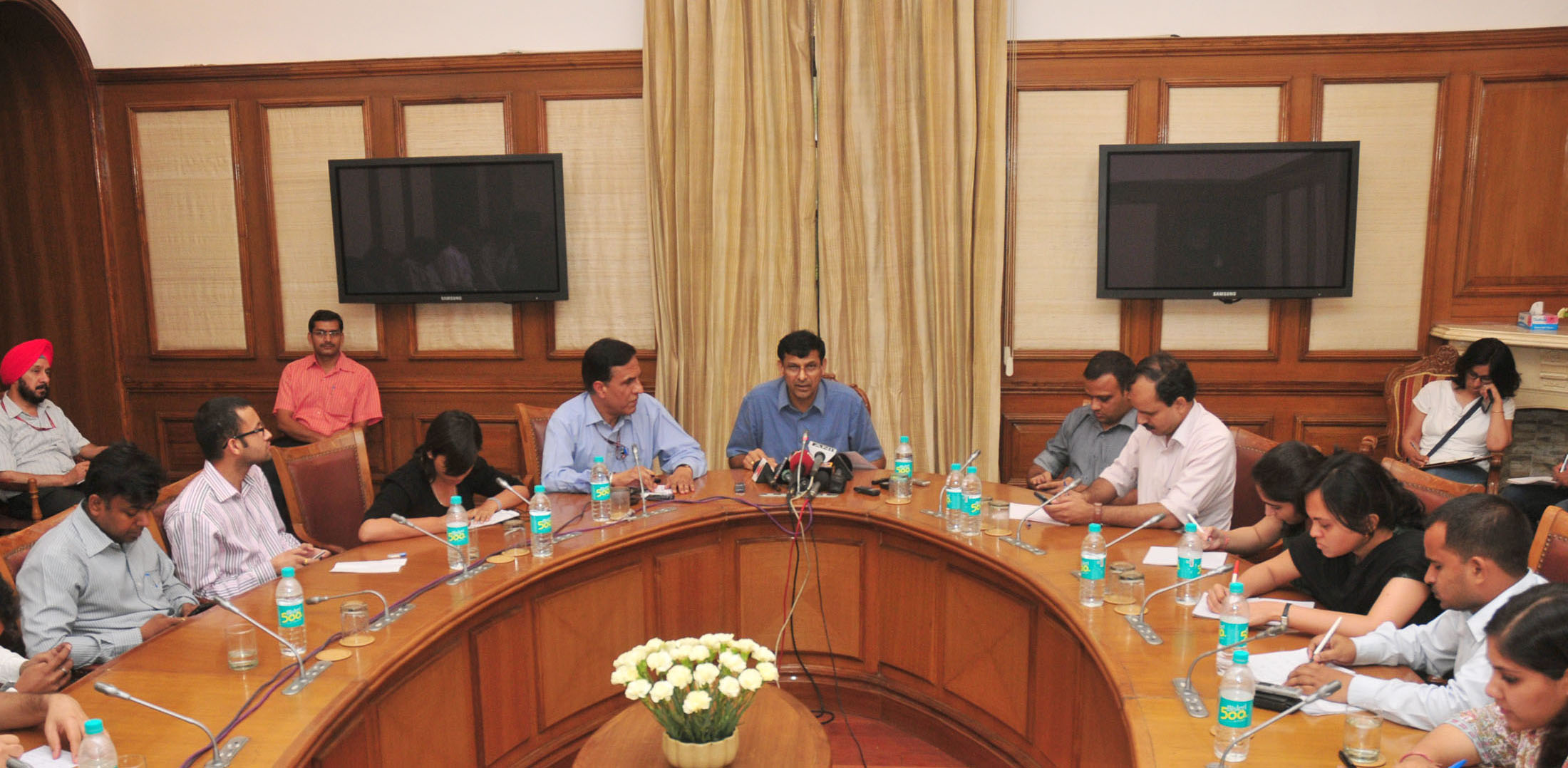
Chief Economic Advisor Raghuram Rajan addressing a press conference in New Delhi in 2013.

In 2007, then Deputy Chairman of the Planning Commission, Montek Singh Ahluwalia, drafted Rajan to write a report proposing the next generation of financial sector reforms in India. A High Level Committee on Financial Sector Reforms was constituted consisting of twelve members, with Rajan as chairman. The committee, in its report titled A Hundred Small Steps, recommended broad-based reforms across the financial sector, arguing that instead of focusing "on a few large, and usually politically controversial steps", India must "take a hundred small steps in the same direction".

In November 2008, Indian Prime Minister Dr Manmohan Singh appointed Rajan as an honorary economic adviser, a role that involved writing policy notes at Singh's request. On 10 August 2012 Rajan was appointed as chief economic adviser to India's Ministry of Finance, succeeding Kaushik Basu in the role. He prepared the Economic Survey of India for the year 2012–13. In the annual survey, he urged the government to reduce spending and subsidies, and recommended the redirection of Indians from agriculture to service and skilled manufacturing sector. He was also skeptical of the Food Security Bill in light of the rising fiscal deficits.

=== Reserve Bank of India ===
On 6 August 2013 it was announced that Rajan would take over as the Governor of the Reserve Bank of India for a term of 3 years, succeeding Duvvuri Subbarao. On 5 September 2013 he took charge as the 23rd governor, at which point he took a leave of absence from the University of Chicago Booth School of Business.

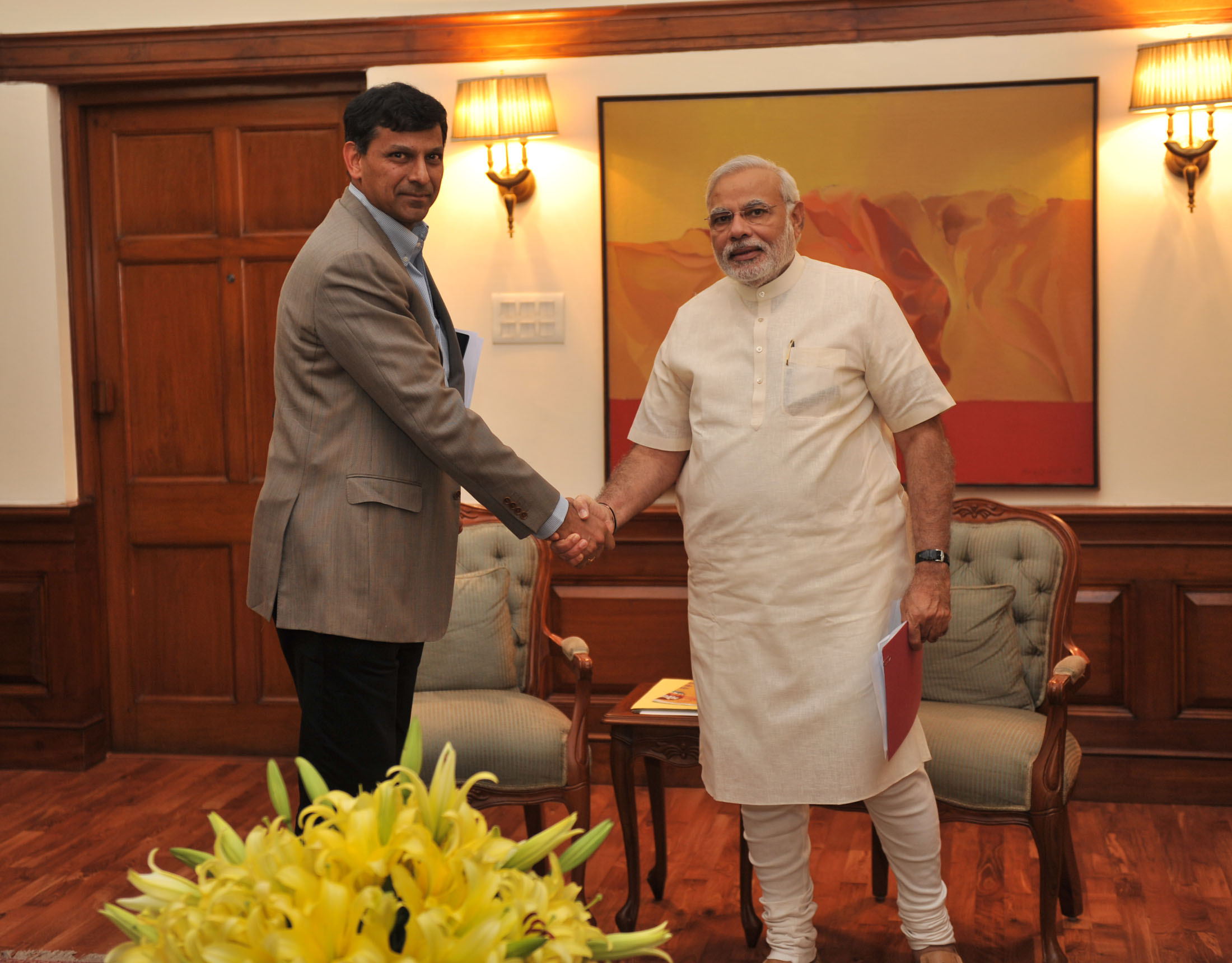
Raghuram Rajan meeting Prime Minister Narendra Modi in 2014.

In his first speech as RBI governor, Rajan promised banking reforms and eased curbs on foreign banking, following which the BSE SENSEX rose by 333 points or 1.83%. After his first day at office, the rupee rose 2.1% against the US dollar. As Governor of the RBI, Rajan made curbing inflation his primary focus, bringing down retail inflation from 9.8% in September 2013 to 3.78% in July 2015 – the lowest since the 1990s. Wholesale inflation came down from 6.1% in September 2013 to a historic low of -4.05% in July 2015.

In a 2014 interview, Rajan said his major targets as governor of the Reserve Bank of India were to lower inflation, increase savings and deepen financial markets, of which he believed reducing inflation was the most important. A panel he appointed proposed an inflation target for India of 6% for January 2016 and 4% (+ or -2%) thereafter. Under Rajan, the RBI adopted consumer price index (CPI) as the key indicator of inflation, which is the global norm, despite the government recommending otherwise. Foreign exchange reserves of India grew by about 30% to the tune of $380 billion in two years. Under Rajan, the RBI licensed two universal banks and approved eleven payments banks to extend banking services to the nearly two-thirds of the population who are still deprived of banking facilities.

During his tenure, he enforced two-factor authentication of domestic credit card transactions to ensure the safety of customers. However, in an apparent contradiction of his previous stance of encouraging customers to use banks, he also permitted banks to charge customers for conducting ATM transactions beyond a certain number of times per month, at a time when the Indian Government was actively attempting to promote financial inclusion through its Pradhan Mantri Jan Dhan Yojana scheme, which effectively prevented people from easily accessing their own savings and discouraged them from using formal banking channels.

Media reports positioned Rajan as a prospective successor to Christine Lagarde as head of the IMF when her term expired in 2016, even as Rajan himself countered such speculation. This did not eventually come to bear, as Lagarde was nominated for a second term at the end of her tenure. On 9 November 2015, Rajan was appointed as Vice-Chairman of the Bank for International Settlements (BIS).

In May 2016, in a letter to Prime Minister Narendra Modi, Rajya Sabha MP Subramanian Swamy leveled several allegations against Rajan. He accused Rajan of raising interest rate to the detriment of small and medium industries. He also claimed that Rajan has been sending confidential and sensitive financial information using his University of Chicago unsecured personal email address. But Rajan said that these allegations are fundamentally wrong and baseless and addressing them would amount to giving them legitimacy.

On 18 June 2016, Rajan announced that he would not be serving a second term as RBI Governor, and planned to return to academia. In September 2017, Rajan revealed that though he was willing to take an extension and serve a second term as RBI Governor, the government had not extended any offer to him which left him with no choice but to return to the University of Chicago. He also denied claims that the University of Chicago had, at that time, refused to accept his leave of absence to continue for a second term.

== Economic and political views ==
Rajan on economic weapons

When fully unleashed, sanctions, too, are weapons of mass destruction. They may not topple buildings or collapse bridges, but they destroy firms, financial institutions, livelihoods, and even lives. Like military WMDs, they inflict pain indiscriminately, striking both the culpable and the innocent.

— Raghuram Rajan, "Economic Weapons of Mass Destruction". Project Syndicate. 17 March 2022

Rajan's economic and political views were influenced by his experience of the Indian economy during The Emergency. As an economist, he was therefore wary of the risks of both unnecessary government intervention as well as unregulated financial markets, while remaining a champion of capitalism. He is a proponent of democracy working with capitalism. In May 2023, in his speech at the Ideas for India Conference organised by Bridge India he argued that India’s democracy is the path to its economic growth, attracting media attention.

=== Financial markets ===
Rajan advocates giving financial markets a greater role in the economy. In the book Saving Capitalism from the Capitalists: Unleashing the Power of Financial Markets to Create Wealth and Spread Opportunity co-authored with Luigi Zingales, the two authors argue in favour of deregulated financial markets in order to facilitate access of the poor to finance: "Capitalism, or more precisely, the free market system, is the most effective way to organise production and distribution that human beings have found … healthy and competitive financial markets are an extraordinarily effective tool in spreading opportunity and fighting poverty. …Without vibrant, innovative financial markets, economies would ossify and decline." (p 1)

In 2005, at a celebration honouring Alan Greenspan, who was about to retire as chairman of the US Federal Reserve, Rajan delivered a controversial paper that was critical of the financial sector. In that paper, "Has Financial Development Made the World Riskier?", Rajan "argued that disaster might loom." Rajan argued that financial sector managers were encouraged to "take risks that generate severe adverse consequences with small probability but, in return, offer generous compensation the rest of the time. These risks are known as tail risks. But perhaps the most important concern is whether banks will be able to provide liquidity to financial markets so that if the tail risk does materialise, financial positions can be unwound and losses allocated so that the consequences to the real economy are minimised."

The response to Rajan's paper at the time was negative. For example, former U.S. Treasury Secretary and former Harvard President Lawrence Summers called the warnings "misguided" and Rajan himself a "luddite". However, following the 2008 financial crisis, Rajan's views came to be seen as prescient; by January 2009, The Wall Street Journal proclaimed that now, "few are dismissing his ideas." In fact, Rajan was extensively interviewed on the global crisis for the Academy Award-winning documentary film Inside Job. Rajan wrote in May 2012 that the causes of the ongoing economic crisis in the US and Europe in the 2008–2012 period were substantially due to workforce competitiveness issues in the globalisation era, which politicians attempted to "paper-over" with easy credit. He proposed supply-side solutions of a long-term structural or national competitiveness nature: "The industrial countries should treat the crisis as a wake-up call and move to fix all that has been papered over in the last few decades... Rather than attempting to return to their artificially inflated GDP numbers from before the crisis, governments need to address the underlying flaws in their economies. In the United States, that means educating or retraining the workers who are falling behind, encouraging entrepreneurship and innovation, and harnessing the power of the financial sector to do good while preventing it from going off track. In southern Europe, by contrast, it means removing the regulations that protect firms and workers from competition and shrinking the government's presence in a number of areas, in the process eliminating unnecessary, unproductive jobs."

=== Austerity vs stimulus ===
During May 2012, Rajan and Paul Krugman expressed differing views on how to reinvigorate the economies in the US and Europe, with Krugman mentioning Rajan by name in an opinion editorial. This debate occurred against the backdrop of a significant "austerity vs stimulus" debate occurring at the time, with some economists arguing one side or the other or a combination of both strategies. In an article in Foreign Affairs magazine, Rajan advocated structural or supply-side reforms to improve competitiveness of the workforce to better adapt to globalisation, while also supporting fiscal austerity measures (E.g., raising taxes and cutting spending), although he conceded that austerity could slow economies in the short-run and cause significant "pain" for certain constituencies. Krugman rejected this focus on structural reforms combined with fiscal austerity. Instead he advocated traditional Keynesian fiscal (government spending and investment) and monetary stimulus, arguing that the primary factor slowing the developed economies at that time was a general shortfall in demand across all sectors of the economy, not structural or supply-side factors that affected particular sectors.

As far as his position on India is concerned, Rajan stayed away from the Bhagwati vs. Sen debate, and has tended to sympathize with both sides of the so-called "growth vs. welfare" argument. While Rajan's views in general align with Bhagwati's (with respect to how growth is seen as the main source of development), he has also argued for government involvement in health and education like Sen, and has pointed to the resultant threat of oligarchy or alienation of the poor.

In 2019, Rajan said that, after the 2008 financial crisis and the imposition of austerity, contemporary capitalism "is under serious threat" because it has stopped providing opportunities for the many and is now facing a possible revolt from the masses.

=== Demonetization in India ===
In interviews in September 2017, Rajan said the Government of India had consulted the Reserve Bank of India, during his Governorship, on the issue of demonetization but never asked to take a decision. He said the RBI was against the move and warned the government of the potential negative effects. Rajan also termed the currency notes ban exercise as, "One cannot in any way say it has been an economic success".

=== Bharat Jodo Yatra ===
Rajan was criticized by BJP leaders after attending the Rahul Gandhi-led Bharat Jodo Yatra.

== Awards ==
- In 2003, Rajan won the inaugural Fischer Black Prize awarded by the American Finance Association for contributions to the theory and practice of finance by an economist under age 40.
- In February 2010 NASSCOM named him Global Indian at its 7th annual global leadership awards.
- In 2010, he was awarded the Financial Times and McKinsey Business Book of the Year Award, Fault Lines: How Hidden Fractures Still Threaten the World Economy.
- In November 2011 he received the Infosys Prize for Social Sciences – Economics for his work in analyzing the contribution of financial development to economic growth, as well as the potentially harmful effects of dysfunctional incentives that lead to excessive risk-taking.
- In 2013, he was awarded the fifth Deutsche Bank Prize in Financial Economics for his "ground-breaking research work which influenced financial and macro-economic policies around the world".
- In 2014 he was conferred with the "Governor of the Year Award 2014" from London-based financial journal Central Banking.
- In March 2019, he was awarded "Yashwantrao Chavan National Award 2018" for his contribution to economic development.
- In May 2023 he was awarded an honorary doctorate by the London School of Economics.

== Bibliography ==
- Saving Capitalism from the Capitalists (2004), Random House. Co-authored with fellow Chicago Booth professor Luigi Zingales.
- Fault Lines: How Hidden Fractures Still Threaten the World Economy (2010), Princeton University Press. Financial Times and Goldman Sachs Business Book of the Year Award for 2010.
- I Do What I Do (2017), Harper Collins. A collection of speeches delivered during his stint as the Governor of the Reserve Bank of India
- The Third Pillar: How the State and Markets are leaving Communities Behind (2019), Penguin Press.
- What the Economy Needs Now (2019), Juggernaut Books. Co-authored.
- Breaking the Mould: Reimagining India's Economic Future (2023), Penguin Press. Co-authored with Rohit Lamba.

Rajan has also published numerous articles in finance and economics journals including the American Economic Review, Journal of Economic Perspectives, Journal of Political Economy, Journal of Financial Economics, Journal of Finance and Oxford Review of Economic Policy.

- The True Lessons of the Recession; The West Can't Borrow and Spend Its Way to Recovery by Rajan in May/June 2012 Foreign Affairs

== Personal life ==
Raghuram Rajan is an Indian citizen and holds a USA Green Card. He is married to Radhika Puri Rajan, whom he met while they were both students at IIM Ahmedabad. Radhika teaches at University of Chicago Law School. She is also an Adjunct Associate Professor of Behavioral Science at the University of Chicago Booth School of Business. They have a daughter and a son.

Rajan is a vegetarian. He likes the outdoors and plays tennis and squash. He enjoys reading Tolstoy, J. R. R. Tolkien and Upamanyu Chatterjee. Rajan appeared on Siddharth Basu's quiz show Quiz Time, telecasted on the national television channel Doordarshan, in 1985, teaming up with his batchmate Jayant Sinha to represent IIT Delhi. He has also participated in various marathons, such as the Standard Chartered Mumbai Marathon 2015.

Diplomatic posts
Preceded by Kenneth Rogoff	Chief Economist of the International Monetary Fund; 2003–2007	Succeeded by Simon Johnson
Government offices
Preceded by Kaushik Basu	Chief Economic Adviser of India; 2012–2013	Succeeded by Arvind Subramanian
Preceded by Duvvuri Subbarao	Governor of the Reserve Bank of India; 2013–2016	Succeeded by Urjit Patel
Non-profit organization positions
Preceded by John H. Cochrane	President of the American Finance Association; 2011	Succeeded by Sheridan Titman
