= Order of precedence in India =

Relative preeminence of officials for ceremonial purposes

The order of precedence of the Republic of India is a list in which the functionaries, dignitaries and officials are listed for ceremonial purposes and has no legal standing and does not reflect the Indian presidential line of succession or the co-equal status of the separation of powers under the Constitution of India. The order is established by the President of India through the President's Secretariat and maintained by the Ministry of Home Affairs.

The order in the Table of Precedence is meant for State and Ceremonial occasions and has no application in the day-to-day business of Government.

== Order of Precedence ==
If there are multiple persons of similar rank, then they will be listed in alphabetical order. The order of precedence between themselves is determined by the date of entry into that position/rank.

Indian Order of Precedence
Rank	Position	Current office holder(s)
1	President	Droupadi Murmu
2	Vice President (Chairman of the Rajya Sabha)	C. P. Radhakrishnan
3	Prime Minister	Narendra Modi
4	Governors (within their respective states)	List of governors
5	Living former presidents	Pratibha Patil; Ram Nath Kovind
5A	Deputy Prime Minister	vacant
6	Chief Justice of India	Surya Kant
6	Speaker of the Lok Sabha	Om Birla
7	Union cabinet ministers	List of union cabinet ministers
7	Chief ministers (within their respective states)	List of chief ministers
7	Living former prime ministers	H. D. Deve Gowda
7	Principal Secretary to the Prime Minister	Pramod Kumar Mishra; Shaktikanta Das
7	National Security Advisor	Ajit Doval
7	Vice Chairperson of the NITI Aayog	Ashok Lahiri
7	Chairman of the Economic Advisory Council to the Prime Minister	S. Mahendra Dev
7	Leader of the Opposition in Rajya Sabha	Mallikarjun Kharge
7	Leader of the Opposition in Lok Sabha	Rahul Gandhi
7A	Living recipients of the Bharat Ratna	Amartya Sen; C. N. R. Rao; Sachin Tendulkar; L. K. Advani
8	Ambassadors extraordinary and plenipotentiary and high commissioners of the Commonwealth countries accredited to India	List of ambassadors and high commissioners to India
8	Governors (outside their respective states)	List of governors
8	Chief ministers (outside their respective states)	List of chief ministers
9	Judges of the Supreme Court	List of judges of the Supreme Court
9A	Chairperson of the Union Public Service Commission	Ajay Kumar
9A	Chief Election Commissioner	Gyanesh Kumar
9A	Comptroller and Auditor General	K Sanjay Murthy
10	Deputy Chairperson of the Rajya Sabha	Harivansh Narayan Singh
10	Deputy Speaker of the Lok Sabha	vacant
10	Ministers of State of the Union	List of ministers of state
10	Governor of the Reserve Bank of India	Sanjay Malhotra
10	Deputy chief ministers (within their respective states)	List of deputy chief ministers
10	Members of the NITI Aayog	List of NITI Aayog members
10	Additional National Security Advisor	Rajinder Khanna
11	Lieutenant governors (within their respective union territories)	List of lieutenant governors
11	Cabinet Secretary	T. V. Somanathan
11	Attorney General	R. Venkataramani
11	Principal Scientific Adviser	Ajay K. Sood
12	Chiefs of staff holding the rank of General or equivalent rank (four-star rank officers in the armed forces)	
12	Chief of Defence Staff	General N. S. Raja Subramani
12	Chief of the Army Staff	General Dhiraj Seth
12	Chief of the Naval Staff	Admiral Krishna Swaminathan
12	Chief of the Air Staff	Air Chief Marshal Ashutosh Dixit
13	Envoys extraordinary and ministers plenipotentiary accredited to India	various
14	Chief justices of high courts (within their respective jurisdictions)	List of chief justices
14	State legislative speakers and chairpersons (within their respective states)	List of state legislative speakers and chairpersons
15	Deputy Ministers of the Union	Union Council of Ministers
15	Union territory chief ministers (within their respective union territories)	List of chief ministers
15	Deputy chief ministers (outside their respective states)	List of deputy chief ministers
15	State Cabinet Ministers (within their respective states)	various
16	Officiating chiefs of staff holding the rank of Lieutenant General or equivalent rank (three-star rank) officers in the armed forces	vacant
17	Chief justices of high courts (outside their respective jurisdictions)	List of chief justices of high courts
17	Judges of high courts (within their respective jurisdictions)	List of judges of high courts
17	Chairperson of the Central Administrative Tribunal	Ranjit Vasantrao More
17	Chairperson of the National Human Rights Commission	V. Ramasubramanian
17	Chairperson of the National Commission for Women	Vijaya Kishore Rahatkar
17	Chairperson of the National Commission for Protection of Child Rights	Priyank Kanoongo
17	Chairperson of the National Commission for Minorities	Iqbal Singh Lalpura
17	Chairperson of the National Commission for Scheduled Castes	Kishor Makwana
17	Chairperson of the National Commission for Scheduled Tribes	Antar Singh Arya
17	Chairperson of the National Commission for Backward Classes	Hansraj Gangaram Ahir
17	Chief Vigilance Commissioner	Praveen Kumar Srivastava
18	State cabinet ministers (outside their respective states)	various
18	State legislative speakers and chairpersons (outside their respective states)	List of state legislative speakers and chairpersons
18	Chairperson of the Competition Commission	Ravneet Kaur
18	Union territory legislative speakers (within their respective union territories)	List of legislative speakers
18	State legislative deputy speakers and deputy chairpersons (within their respective states)	various
18	State ministers of state (within their respective states)	various
18	Union territory ministers (within their respective union territories)	various
19	Union territory legislative speakers (outside their respective union territories)	various
19	Administrators (within their respective union territories)	List of administrators
19	State deputy ministers (within their respective states)	various
20	State legislative deputy speakers and deputy chairpersons (outside their respective states)	various
20	State ministers of state (outside their respective state)	various
20	Judges of high courts (outside their respective jurisdictions)	List of judges of high courts
21	Members of Parliament	
21	Members of Rajya Sabha	List of Rajya Sabha members
21	Members of Lok Sabha	List of Lok Sabha members
22	State deputy ministers (outside their respective states)	various
23	Secretaries to the union government (Note: In official functions held at New Delhi, Army commanders/Vice Chief of the Army Staff or equivalent in other services will always rank after secretaries to the union government.)	various
23	Special Secretaries to the union government	various
23	Deputy Governor of the Reserve Bank of India	Swaminathan Janakiraman; Poonam Gupta; Shirish Chandra Murmu; Rohit Jain
23	Chairpersons of the SEBI, IRDAI, PFRDA and other regulatory agencies	Various
23	Chief Economic Advisor to the Government of India	V. Anantha Nageswaran
23	Full time Members of Economic Advisory Council to the Prime Minister	Shamika Ravi; Sanjeev Sanyal; Sanjay Kumar Mishra
23	Chairpersons of DRDO, NTRO, ISRO, BARC and other scientific research agencies	Various
23	Chairperson of the State Bank of India	Challa Sreenivasulu Setty
23	Vice-chancellors of both Central and State government universities	Various
23	Deputy National Security Advisors	T. V. Ravichandran; Pavan Kapoor; Anish Dayal Singh
23	Senior three-star rank officers in the armed forces who are in the C-in-C (Commanding-in-Chief) grade or vice chiefs of staff, holding the rank of Lieutenant General or equivalent rank	List of serving Indian Commanders-in-Chief
23	Vice Chief of the Army Staff	Lieutenant General Sandeep Jain
23	Army commanders (General officers commanding-in-chief)	List of army commanders
23	Vice Chief of the Naval Staff	Vice Admiral Ajay Kochhar
23	Naval commanders (Flag officers commanding-in-chief)	List of naval commanders
23	Vice Chief of the Air Staff	Air Marshal Ashutosh Dixit
23	Air commanders (Air officers commanding-in-chief)	List of air commanders
23	Secretary to the President	Rajesh Verma
23	Secretary General of the Rajya Sabha	Pramod Chandra Mody
23	Secretary General of the Lok Sabha	Utpal Kumar Singh
23	Chief secretaries to state/union territory governments (within their respective states)	various
23	District and sessions judges and judicial officers of equivalent rank.	various
23	State chairpersons, State Commission for Human Rights	various
23	State chairpersons, State Commission for Women	various
23	State chairpersons, State Commission for Child Rights	various
23	State chairpersons, State Commission for Minorities	various
23	State chairpersons, State Commission for Scheduled Castes	various
23	State chairpersons, State Commission for Scheduled Tribes	various
23	State chairpersons, State Commission for Backward Class	various
23	Members of the National Human Rights Commission	various
23	Members of the National Commission for Women	various
23	Members of the National Commission for the Protection of Child Rights	various
23	Members of the National Commission for Minorities	various
23	Members of the National Commission for Scheduled Castes	various
23	Members of the National Commission for Scheduled Tribes	various
23	Members of the National Commission for Backward Classes	various
23	Solicitor General	Tushar Mehta
24	Lieutenant generals of the Indian Army	List of lieutenant generals
24	Vice admirals of the Indian Navy	List of vice admirals
24	Air marshals of the Indian Air Force	List of air marshals
25
25	Chargé d' affaires and acting high commissioners a pied and ad. interim.	various
25	Lieutenant governors (outside their respective union territories)	List of lieutenant governors
25	Union territory chief ministers (outside their respective union territories)	List of chief ministers
25	Chief secretaries (outside their respective states/union territories)	various
25	Additional secretaries to the union government	various
25	Executive Directors of the regulatory agencies	Various
25	Distinguished Scientists (DS) and Outstanding Scientists (OS) of DRDO, NTRO, ISRO, BARC and other scientific research agencies	Various
25	Additional district and sessions judges and judicial officers of equivalent rank.	various
25	Director of the Intelligence Bureau	Mahesh Dixit
25	Directors general of police of various State police forces.	List of DGP of states and UTs
25	Directors general of Central Armed Police Forces (AR, BSF, CISF, CRPF, ITBP, NSG and SSB)	various
25	Directors general and Directors of various forces and organisations under the union government (i.e. AAIB, BPRD, NCRB, NDRF etc.)	various
25	Directors of various Security and investigative agencies (i.e. CBI, ED, NCB, NIA and SPG etc.)	various
25	two-star rank principal staff officers of the armed forces of the rank of Major General or equivalent rank (i.e. Rear Admiral and Air Vice Marshal)	various
25	Additional solicitors general	various
25	Advocates general	various
25	Deputy comptrollers and auditors general	various
25	Union territory legislative deputy speakers (outside their respective union territories)	various
25	Union territory ministers (outside their respective union territories)	various
25	Members of the Central Administrative Tribunal	various
25	Members of the Competition Commission	various
25	Members of the Union Public Service Commission	various
25	State members, State Public Service Commission.	various
26	Joint secretaries to the union government and officers of equivalent rank.	various
26	Officers of the rank of Major General or equivalent rank.	various

== See also ==
- List of office-holders in India
- Salaries of government officials in India
