= Deputy Governor of the Reserve Bank of India =

- भारतीय रिजर्व बैंक के उप-गवर्नर
- Seal of the Reserve Bank of India

- Flag of India
- Incumbent; Swaminathan Janakiraman, Poonam Gupta, Shirish Chandra Murmu; Rohit Jain
- Ministry of Finance; Reserve Bank of India
- Type: Senior Executive Officer
- Status: Deputy Head of RBI
- Member of: Central Board of Directors; Monetary Policy Committee
- Reports to: Governor; Secretary (Finance); Finance Minister
- Residence: Mumbai, Maharashtra
- Seat: 19th Floor, Central Office Building, Shahid Bhagat Singh Road, Mumbai, 400 001
- Appointer: Appointments Committee of the Cabinet
- Term length: 5 Years (max)
- Constituting instrument: Reserve Bank of India Act, 1934
- Inaugural holder: Sir James Braid Taylor and Sikandar Hayat Khan
- Formation: 1 April 1935; 91 years ago
- Deputy: Executive Director
- Salary: ₹225,000 (US$2,300) (per month) ₹2,700,000 (US$28,000) (per year)
- Website: www.rbi.org.in/scripts/deputygovernors.aspx

The deputy governor of the Reserve Bank of India is the second most senior executive of the Reserve Bank of India after its governor. Since its establishment in 1934 by the government of India, the RBI has had 63 deputy governors. Currently the rank of deputy governor is equivalent to the rank of Secretary.

The term of office typically runs for three years and can, in some cases, be extended for another two years.

The inaugural officeholder was James Braid Taylor, while K J Udeshi holds the unique distinction of becoming the first female deputy governor of the Reserve Bank of India.

Currently there are four incumbent deputy governors of the Reserve Bank of India, they are: Swaminathan Janakiraman, Poonam Gupta, Shirish Chandra Murmu and Rohit Jain.

== Appointment process ==
The Deputy Governor of RBI is appointed by the Government of India (GoI) under the provisions of the Reserve Bank of India Act, 1934. The appointment is made by the Appointments Committee of the Cabinet (ACC), headed by the Prime Minister and the Home Minister. Typically, the deputy governor is appointed for a term of up to five years, which may be extended or renewed for a second term.

== Duties and responsibilities of the deputy governor ==
The deputy governors of the Reserve Bank of India assist the governor in managing the central bank's overall functions and policy implementation. Each deputy governor is assigned specific portfolios such as monetary policy, banking regulation and supervision, financial markets, or currency management. They help formulate and execute decisions taken by the Monetary Policy Committee and the Central Board of Directors.

They also oversee key operational departments and ensure effective regulation of banks and non-banking financial institutions. In addition, deputy governors represent the RBI in national and international forums when required and contribute to maintaining financial stability, smooth payment systems, and implementation of regulatory frameworks.

== Emolument, accommodation and perquisites ==
The rank of the RBI Deputy Governor is equivalent to the Secretary as per pay-level. The post is accompanied by:

- Official residence in Mumbai, Maharashtra, a Type-VII / VIII bungalow.
- Security cover as per central government rules.
- Eligibility for a diplomatic or official passport for foreign travel.
- Salary as per Pay Level 17 of the 7th Pay Commission. The deputy governor is entitled to receive the Dearness allowance (DA), Travel Allowance (TA) and other allowances which are determined by the GoI.

RBI Deputy Governor monthly pay and allowances
Base Salary as per 7th Pay Commission (Per month)	Pay Matrix Level	Sources
₹225,000 (US$2,300)	Pay Level 17	

== List of deputy governors ==
List of deputy governors of the Reserve Bank of India
No.	Officeholder	Portrait	Term start	Term end	Term in office	Background	Other offices held	References
1	James Braid Taylor		1 April 1935	30 June 1937	2 years, 90 days	Civil servant	Indian Civil Service officer	
2	Sikandar Hayat Khan		1 April 1935	20 October 1935	202 days	Politician	Prime Minister of Punjab	
3	Manilal Balabhai Nanavati		21 December 1936	21 December 1941	5 years, 0 days	Freedom fighter		
4	C. D. Deshmukh		22 December 1941	10 October 1943	1 year, 292 days	Indian Civil Service officer	Minister of Finance	
5	Wajahat Hussain		16 August 1943	4 December 1945	2 years, 49 days			
6	C.R. Trevor		16 August 1943	31 December 1949	6 years, 137 days			
7	M.G. Mekhri		8 July 1946	7 July 1951	4 years, 364 days			
8	W.T. McCallum		15 April 1946	14 July 1948	2 years, 90 days			
9	N. Sundaresan		1 January 1950	31 December 1954	4 years, 364 days			
10	Ram Nath		8 June 1951	8 July 1959	8 years, 30 days			
11	K. G. Ambegaonkar		1 March 1955	29 February 1960	4 years, 365 days	Indian Civil Service officer	Governor of the Reserve Bank of India	
12	Borra Venkatappaiah		1 July 1955	28 February 1962	6 years, 242 days	Career banker	Chairman of the State Bank of India	
13	M.V. Rangachari		1 March 1960	28 February 1965	4 years, 364 days			
14	Dattatreya Gopal Karve		1 March 1962	29 February 1964	1 year, 365 days	Economist	Professor at Fergusson University	
15	C.S. Divekar		12 November 1962	11 November 1965	2 years, 364 days			
16	M.R. Bhide		29 February 1964	25 January 1967	2 years, 331 days			
17	B.K. Madan		1 July 1964	31 January 1967	2 years, 214 days	Economist	Chairman of IDBI Bank	
18	B. N. Adarkar		16 June 1965	3 May 1970	4 years, 321 days	Economist	Governor of the Reserve Bank of India	
19	A. Bakshi		24 January 1967	8 September 1969	2 years, 227 days			
20	J.J. Anjaria		1 February 1967	28 February 1970	3 years, 27 days			
21	P.N. Damry		13 February 1967	15 March 1972	5 years, 31 days	Economist		
22	Rabindra Kishen Hazari		27 November 1969	26 November 1977	7 years, 364 days			
23	V. V. Chari		17 November 1970	30 November 1975	5 years, 13 days			
24	S.S. Shiralkar		18 December 1970	25 July 1976	5 years, 220 days			
25	R.K. Sheshadri		26 July 1973	25 July 1976	2 years, 365 days			
26	K.S. Krishnaswamy		29 December 1975	31 March 1981	5 years, 92 days	Economist		
27	P.R. Nangia		29 December 1975	15 February 1982	6 years, 48 days			
28	J.C. Luther		4 January 1977	1 June 1977	148 days			
29	M. Ramakrishnayya		4 January 1977	1 June 1977	148 days	Indian Administrative Service officer	Chairman of the National Bank for Agriculture and Rural Development	
30	Amitav Ghosh		21 January 1982	20 January 1992	9 years, 364 days	Career banker	Governor of the Reserve Bank of India	
31	C. Rangarajan		12 February 1982	20 August 1991	9 years, 189 days	Career banker	Governor of the Reserve Bank of India	
32	M.V. Hate		12 March 1982	11 March 1985	2 years, 364 days			
33	R.K. Kaul		1 October 1983	30 September 1986	2 years, 364 days			
34	P.D. Ojha		29 April 1985	28 April 1990	4 years, 364 days			
35	P.R. Nayak		1 April 1987	31 March 1992	4 years, 365 days			
36	R. Janakiraman		1 April 1987	31 March 1992	4 years, 365 days	Career banker	Managing director of the State Bank of India	
37	S.S. Tarapore		30 January 1992	30 September 1996	4 years, 244 days	Career banker		
38	D. R. Mehta		11 November 1992	21 February 1995	3 years, 102 days	Economist	Chairman of the Securities and Exchange Board of India	
39	S.P. Talwar		7 November 1994	30 June 2001	6 years, 235 days	Career banker		
40	R.V. Gupta		2 May 1995	30 November 1997	2 years, 212 days	Career banker		
41	Y. V. Reddy		14 September 1996	31 July 2002	5 years, 320 days	Career banker	Governor of the Reserve Bank of India	
42	Jagdish Capoor		1 January 1997	30 June 2001	4 years, 180 days	Career banker	Chairman of HDFC Bank	
43	Vepa Kamesam		1 July 2001	23 December 2003	2 years, 175 days	Career banker	Managing director of the State Bank of India	
44	G P Muniappan		1 July 2001	31 May 2003	1 year, 334 days	Career banker	Chairman of the Deposit Insurance and Credit Guarantee Corporation	
45	Rakesh Mohan		9 September 2002	10 June 2009	6 years, 274 days	Economist	Consultant at the Planning Commission	
46	K J Udeshi		10 June 2003	12 December 2005	2 years, 185 days	Career banker	Chairman of Bharatiya Reserve Bank Note Mudran	
47	V Leeladhar		21 September 2004	8 December 2008	4 years, 78 days	Career banker	Chairman of Union Bank of India	
48	Shyamala Gopinath		21 September 2004	8 December 2008	4 years, 78 days	Career banker	Chairman of HDFC Bank	
49	Usha Thorat		10 November 2005	9 November 2010	4 years, 364 days	Career banker		
50	Kamalesh Chandra Chakrabarty		15 June 2009	25 April 2014	4 years, 314 days	Career banker	Chairman of Bank of Baroda	
51	Subir Gokarn		24 November 2009	31 December 2012	3 years, 37 days	Economist	Professor at Stanford University	
52	Anand Sinha		19 January 2011	18 January 2014	2 years, 364 days	Career banker	Chairman of the Export Credit Guarantee Corporation of India	
53	Harun Rashid Khan		4 July 2011	4 July 2016	5 years, 0 days	Career banker	Chairman of the National Bank for Agriculture and Rural Development	
54	Urjit Patel		11 January 2013	4 September 2016	3 years, 237 days	Career banker	Governor of the Reserve Bank of India	
55	R Gandhi		3 April 2014	2 April 2017	3 years, 237 days	Career banker		
56	Subhash Sheoratan Mundra		31 July 2014	30 July 2017	2 years, 364 days	Career banker		
57	Viral Acharya		23 January 2017	23 January 2019	2 years, 0 days	Career banker		
58	N. S. Vishwanathan		4 July 2016	31 March 2020	3 years, 271 days	Career banker		
59	B.P. Kanungo		3 April 2017	2 April 2021	3 years, 364 days	Career banker		
60	Mahesh Kumar Jain		22 June 2018	26 June 2023	8 years, 126 days	Career banker		
61	Michael Patra		15 January 2020	14 January 2025	6 years, 284 days	Career banker		
62	M. Rajeshwar Rao		9 October 2020	8 October 2025	6 years, 17 days	Career banker		
63	T. Rabi Sankar		3 May 2021	3 May 2026	5 years, 176 days	Career banker		
64	Swaminathan Janakiraman		26 June 2023	Incumbent	3 years, 122 days	Career banker	Managing Director of the State Bank of India	
65	Poonam Gupta		2 April 2025	Incumbent	1 year, 207 days	Economist	Lead Economist at World Bank	
66	Shirish Chandra Murmu		9 October 2025	Incumbent	1 year, 17 days	Career banker		
67	Rohit Jain		4 May 2026	Incumbent	175 days	Career Banker		
