= Subir Gokarn =

Deputy Governor of Reserve Bank of India
- In office 24 November 2009 - 31 December 2012
- Governor: Duvvuri Subbarao
- Preceded by: Shyamala Gopinath
- Succeeded by: Urjit Patel

Personal details
- Born: 3 October 1959
- Died: 30 July 2019 (aged 59)
- Spouse: Dr. Jyotsna Bapat
- Children: 1
- Education: St. Xavier's College, Mumbai (B.A.); Delhi School of Economics (M.A.); Delhi University; Case Western Reserve University (Ph.D.)
- Occupation: Executive Director - International Monetary Fund, Director-Research, Brookings India- Brookings Institution

Subir Vithal Gokarn (3 October 1959 – 30 July 2019) was one of the four Deputy Governors of the Reserve Bank of India along with Anand Sinha, K.C. Chakrabarty and H.R.Khan. He was replaced by Urjit Patel in January 2013.

Appointed by the Government of India on 19 November 2009 for a three-year term beginning 24 November 2009, he succeeded Rakesh Mohan after the latter took up an assignment for six months and joined the Stanford Center for International Development at Stanford University.

Prominent economists like Jahangir Aziz (Chief Economist, JP Morgan) and Dr. Arvind Virmani (Senior Economic Advisor -Ministry of Finance (India)) were also considered for the post that was eventually handed to Dr. Gokarn after a decision by a search panel headed by Duvvuri Subbarao and comprising Janki Ballabh (former SBI Chairman) and Vepa Kamesam (former Deputy Governor- RBI).

Prior to his appointment as the Deputy Governor of the Reserve Bank of India, Dr. Gokarn was the Chief Economist of global rating agency Standard and Poor's (S&P) Asia-Pacific since August 2007. He was the head of CRISIL's Research and Information business and also a nominee Board Member of the State Bank Of India.

Appointed at the age of 49, Dr. Gokarn was one of the youngest Deputy Governors of RBI in its 76-year history and was to supervise the Monetary Policy Department, Department of Statistics and Information Management, Department of Economic Analysis and Policy, Credit Guarantee Corporation, Department of Communication and Deposit Insurance and also represent the Reserve Bank at the G-20 Deputies’ forum.

Subir then joined Brookings India, an independent think-tank, as Director of Research and Brookings Senior Fellow. He died on 30 July 2019.

== Education ==
Dr. Gokarn graduated from St. Xavier's College, Mumbai, with a B.A. (Hons.) in Economics (1979) and from the Delhi School of Economics with an M.A. in Economics (1981). After a two-year stint with the Bureau of Industrial Costs and Prices, he went on to pursue a Ph.D. in Economics at Case Western Reserve University, USA, which he received in 1989. He was a Fulbright Scholar and spent an academic year at the Economic Growth centre at Yale University, USA on a Fulbright Research Fellowship which he was awarded in 1997.

== Past Appointments ==
Dr.Gokarn has previously held the position of Associate Professor at the Indira Gandhi Institute of Development Research (IGIDR) in Mumbai and then the Chief Economist and Industrial Finance Corporation of India (IFCI) Chair at the National Council of Applied Economic Research (NCAER) in New Delhi prior to his move to CRISIL. He was the Chief Economist, Centre for Economic Research and Executive Director of CRISIL Ltd. till August 2007 and then served as the Chief Economist at Standard and Poor's (S&P) Asia Pacific (which acquired a majority stake in CRISIL in 2005) till his appointment in the RBI in 2009 and has been a Member on the Boards of organisations like Global Data Services of India Ltd, EconoMatters Ltd and CRISIL MarketWire Ltd. He has also served as the former Chairperson of the Economic Affairs Committee of the ASSOCHAM.

== See also ==
- List of Case Western people
