= Michael Patra =

Indian economist and central banker

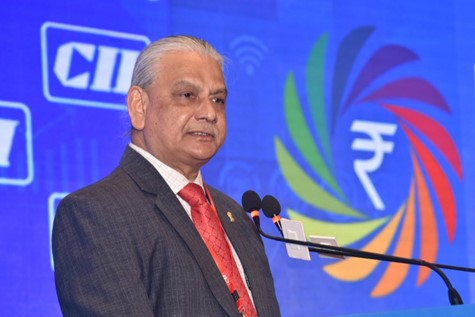

Deputy Governor of the Reserve Bank of India
- In office 15 January 2020 – 14 January 2025
- Appointed by: Appointments Committee of the Cabinet
- Governor: Shaktikanta Das; Sanjay Malhotra
- Preceded by: Viral Acharya
- Succeeded by: Poonam Gupta (Economist)

Personal details
- Born: Michael Debabrata Patra; 29 September 1960 (age 66) Cuttack, Odisha, India
- Education: (B.A) Ravenshaw University (M.A) Utkal University (PhD) IIT Bombay (Post Doctorate)Harvard University
- Occupation: Central banker Economist; Civil servant

Michael Debabrata Patra (born 29 September 1960) is an Indian economist and central banker who served as the Deputy Governor of the Reserve Bank of India from 2020 to 2025. As a central banker he has spent most of his career at RBI.

== Education ==
Born in Cuttack, Odisha, into an Odia Christian family, Michael Debebrata Patra did his graduation from the Ravenshaw College and post graduation from Utkal University. Patra has a PhD in economics from the Indian Institute of Technology Bombay in Mumbai, with his thesis being titled "The Role of Invisibles in India's Balance of Payments: A Structural Approach". Patra proceeded to do post-doctoral research on financial stability at Harvard University as a fellow.

Patra received professional training at IMF Institute on Financial Programming and Policy and at the Bank of England's Centre for Central Banking Studies.

== Career ==
Patra is a 1985 batch RBI Grade B officer. Before his appointment as deputy governor, Patra served as the executive director of the monetary policy department of RBI—where he moved to in 2006—and as such, was an internal member of the powerful Monetary Policy Committee. Earlier, Patra served as an adviser in charge of international finance, money, and banking in RBI's department of economic analysis.

From December 2008 and June 2012, Patra served on deputation to the International Monetary Fund as senior adviser to India's executive director at the fund.

=== Deputy Governor ===
In January 2020, Patra was appointed a Deputy Governor of the Reserve Bank of India by the Appointments Committee of the Cabinet—on the recommendation of the Cabinet Secretary-headed Financial Sector Regulatory Appointment Search Committee—for a period of three years, succeeding Viral Acharya, who had resigned in July 2019. With his appointment as deputy governor, Patra became the second RBI career economist to be elevated to the position. Shri S.S. Tarapore was the first RBI career economist who later became the Deputy Governor.

Patra took charge as deputy governor on 15 January 2020, and was assigned to look after RBI's monetary policy department, financial markets operations department, financial markets regulation department, international department, department of economic and policy research, department of statistics and information management, corporate strategy and budget department and financial stability unit. As the deputy governor in charge of the monetary policy department, Patra became an ex-officio member of the Monetary Policy Committee and served there till 14 January 2025.

== Work ==
- Kishore, Adarsh; Debrata Patra, Michael; Ray, Partha (2011). The Global Economic Crisis through an Indian Looking Glass. SAGE India. ISBN 978-8132106517.
