= Anand Sinha =

Deputy Governor of Reserve Bank of India
- In office 19 January 2011 – 18 January 2014
- Governor: Duvvuri Subbarao; Raghuram Rajan
- Preceded by: Usha Thorat
- Succeeded by: R Gandhi

Personal details
- Born: India
- Education: Indian Institute of Technology Delhi, IIT Delhi
- Occupation: Banker
- Known for: Deputy Governor of Reserve Bank of India

Anand Sinha served as a deputy governor of the Reserve Bank of India, looking after Urban Banking, Risk Monitoring, Banking Operations & Development, Non-Banking Supervision, Expenditure & Budgetary Control and Information Technology.

== Early life and education ==
Anand Sinha studied physics at the undergraduate level. He obtained his master's degree in physics from the Indian Institute of Technology, New Delhi.

== Professional career ==
He was a member of the CGFS Working Group on Capital Flows to Emerging Market Economies. He represented India on the G20 Working Group on "Enhancing Sound Regulation and Strengthening Transparency" set up after the 2008 financial crisis.

Shri Sinha served as director of Export Credit Guarantee Corporation of India Limited since 27 February 2006. He served as the Reserve Bank's nominee director on the boards of Dena Bank, Allahabad Bank, Bank of Baroda, Indian Overseas Bank, Deposit Insurance and Credit Guarantee Corporation and Export Credit and Guarantee Corporation at different phases of his career.

On 19 January 2011, Anand Sinha was appointed as deputy governor of RBI for a period of two years. His appointed was extended for a further period of 11 months till 18 January 2014. This extension was given to Sinha to smoothen the process of issue of new bank licences, an area being handled by him as the deputy governor in charge of Banking Operations and Development. The extension to Sinha, given on Governor Subbarao's recommendation to the Government, came as a surprise, as two other executive directors of RBI, G. Gopalakrishna and R. Gandhi were in the race for the post of deputy governor when Sinha's original tenure came to an end. This was the first time in recent years that a DG of RBI continued in office beyond the age of 62.
