= Shirish Chandra Murmu =

Deputy Governor of the Reserve Bank of India (RBI) since 2025

Deputy Governor of the Reserve Bank of India
- Incumbent
- Assumed office 9 October 2025
- Prime Minister: Narendra Modi
- Governor: Sanjay Malhotra
- Preceded by: M. Rajeshwar Rao

Executive Director, Reserve Bank of India
- In office 1st November 2019 – 8th October 2025
- Governor: Shaktikanta Das; Sanjay Malhotra

Personal details
- Born: Odisha, India
- Education: Jawaharlal Nehru University (M.Sc); Certified Associate of Indian Institute of Banking (CAIIB)
- Occupation: RBI Officer, Central banker, Economist, Technocrat

Shirish Chandra Murmu is an Indian central banker and economist who serves as a Deputy Governor (DG) of the Reserve Bank of India (RBI). A career central banker with over 33 years of experience, he assumed office on October 9, 2025, for a three-year tenure. Prior to his elevation as Deputy Governor, he served as an executive director of the RBI.

== Early life and education ==
Shri Murmu completed his Master of Science (M.Sc.) in Life Sciences from Jawaharlal Nehru University (JNU). He is also a Certified Associate of Indian Institute of Banking (CAIIB). One of his brother, Girish Chandra Murmu is a retired IAS officer and the former Comptroller and Auditor General of India (CAG).

== Career ==
Murmu joined the Reserve Bank of India (RBI) in 1991 as a Grade B officer (Manager) and has worked across various positions over a career spanning more than three decades. As an executive director, he oversaw the Department of Supervision and the Secretary's Department. His areas of expertise encompass regulation and supervision of regulated entities and the management of IT infrastructure.

Upon taking charge as Deputy Governor, his portfolio includes the Department of Communication, the Department of Government and Bank Accounts, the Department of Regulation, and the Enforcement Department.

Throughout his career, Murmu has held several leadership and senior management positions, including Regional Director of the Kolkata Office and Chief General Manager (CGM) in the Department of Information Technology (IT) at the Central Office, Mumbai. He has also handled core central banking functions such as Banking Regulation and Currency Management. Additionally, he served as an RBI Nominee Director on the boards of the Bank of India, Dena Bank, and ECGC Limited.

He is a Member on the Board of Securities and Exchange Board of India (SEBI), security regulator of India and Financial Services Institutions Bureau (FSIB), which selects MDs & CEOs of Public Sector Banks and other such Financial Institutions.

== Committees ==
Murmu has headed multiple high-level internal committees tasked with reviewing RBI regulations across various sectors:

- Chairperson of the Inter-Institutional Committee on Comprehensive Review of Priority Sector Lending Certificates
- Chairperson of the Internal Group on Regulation Cluster (Commercial and Cooperative Banking, Non-Banking)
- Invitee in Regulatory Review Authority 2.0 established in April 2021
- Member of the Internal Working Group to Review Extant Ownership Guidelines and Corporate Structure for Indian Private Sector Banks constituted in 2020''

== See also ==
- Reserve Bank of India
- Governor of the Reserve Bank of India
