= N. S. Vishwanathan =

Former deputy governor of the Reserve Bank of India

Deputy Governor of the Reserve Bank of India
- In office 4 July 2016 – 31 March 2020
- Governor: Raghuram Rajan; Urjit Patel; Shaktikanta Das
- Preceded by: H. R. Khan
- Succeeded by: M. Rajeshwar Rao

Personal details
- Born: 27 June 1958 (age 68)
- Education: Master's in Economics from the Bangalore University
- Profession: RBI Deputy Governor
- Website: rbi.org.in

N. S. Vishwanathan (born 27 June 1958) was the deputy governor of Reserve Bank of India. On 28 June 2016, he was appointed by the Appointments Committee of the Cabinet of the Government of India. He replaced H. R. Khan, whose term ended on 4 July 2016.

== Career ==
- Principal chief general manager in the department of non-banking supervision at Reserve Bank of India.
- Executive director at Reserve Bank of India since April 2014.
- Director of Punjab National Bank from 6 September 2012, to 31 May 2013.
- Nominee director at Dena Bank Ltd. from 30 May 2011, to 6 September 2012.
- Chief general manager of vigilance at IFCI Ltd.
