= 13th BRICS summit =

2021 international summit hosted by India

2021 BRICS summit 13th BRICS summit
- 9 September, 2021 (digital format)
- Host country: India
- Motto: BRICS @ 15: Intra-BRICS Cooperation for Continuity, Consolidation and Consensus.
- Cities: New Delhi
- Participants: Brazil; Russia; India; China; South Africa
- Chair: Narendra Modi, Prime minister of India
- Website: brics2021.gov.in

Key points
- Political and Security; Economic and Financial; Cultural and People to People

The 2021 BRICS summit is the thirteenth annual BRICS summit, an international relations conference attended by the heads of state or heads of government of the five member states Brazil, Russia, India, China and South Africa. It was the third time that India hosted the BRICS Summit after 2012 and 2016. The summit was hosted virtually by video conference. The summit was taken virtually from New Delhi, India.

== Meetings ==
India hosted the first meeting of BRICS finance and central bank deputies through video conference. The meeting was co-chaired by Michael Patra, Deputy Governor, Reserve Bank of India and Tarun Bajaj, Secretary Department of Revenue, Ministry of Finance, India.

== Participating leaders ==
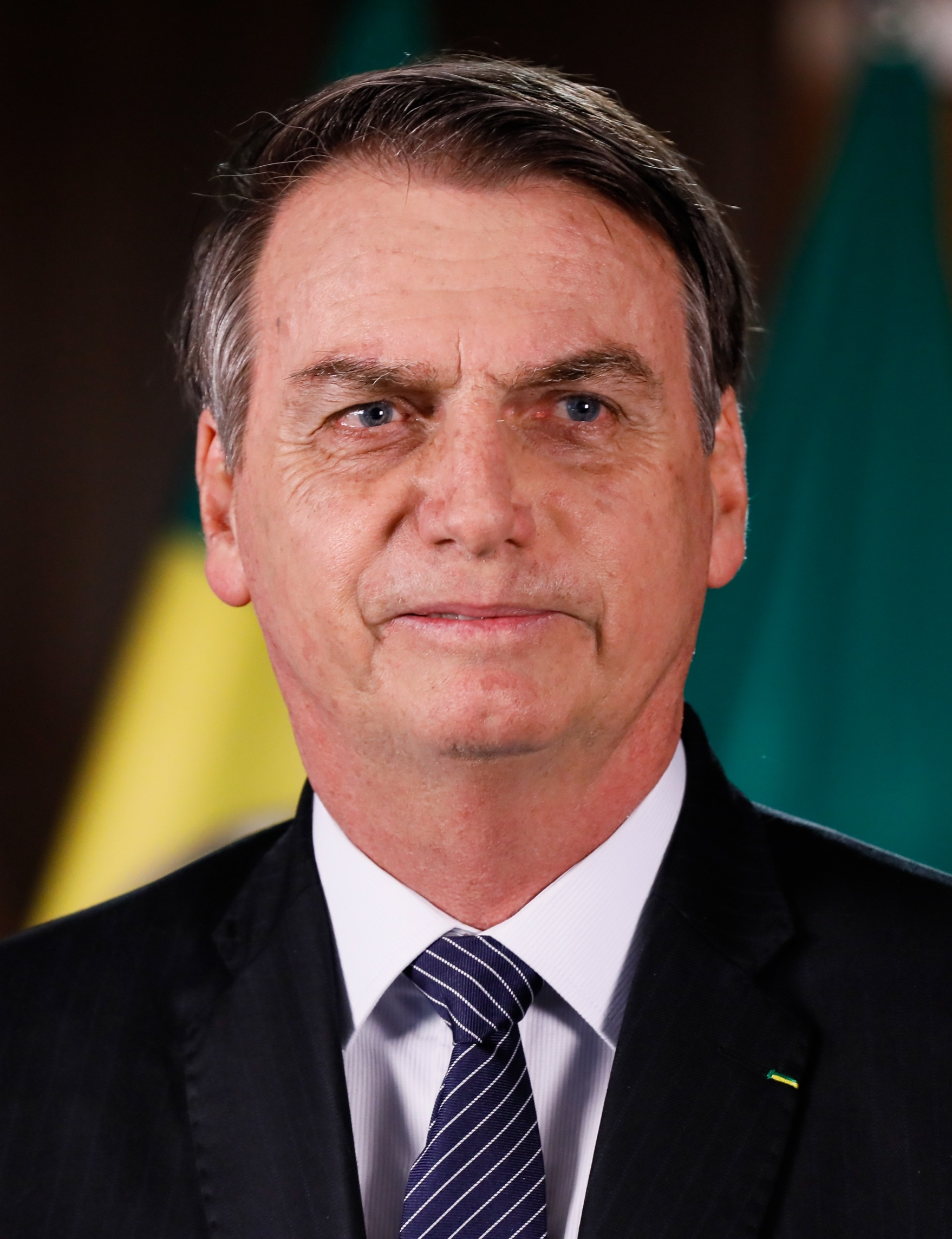
Brazil
Jair Bolsonaro, President

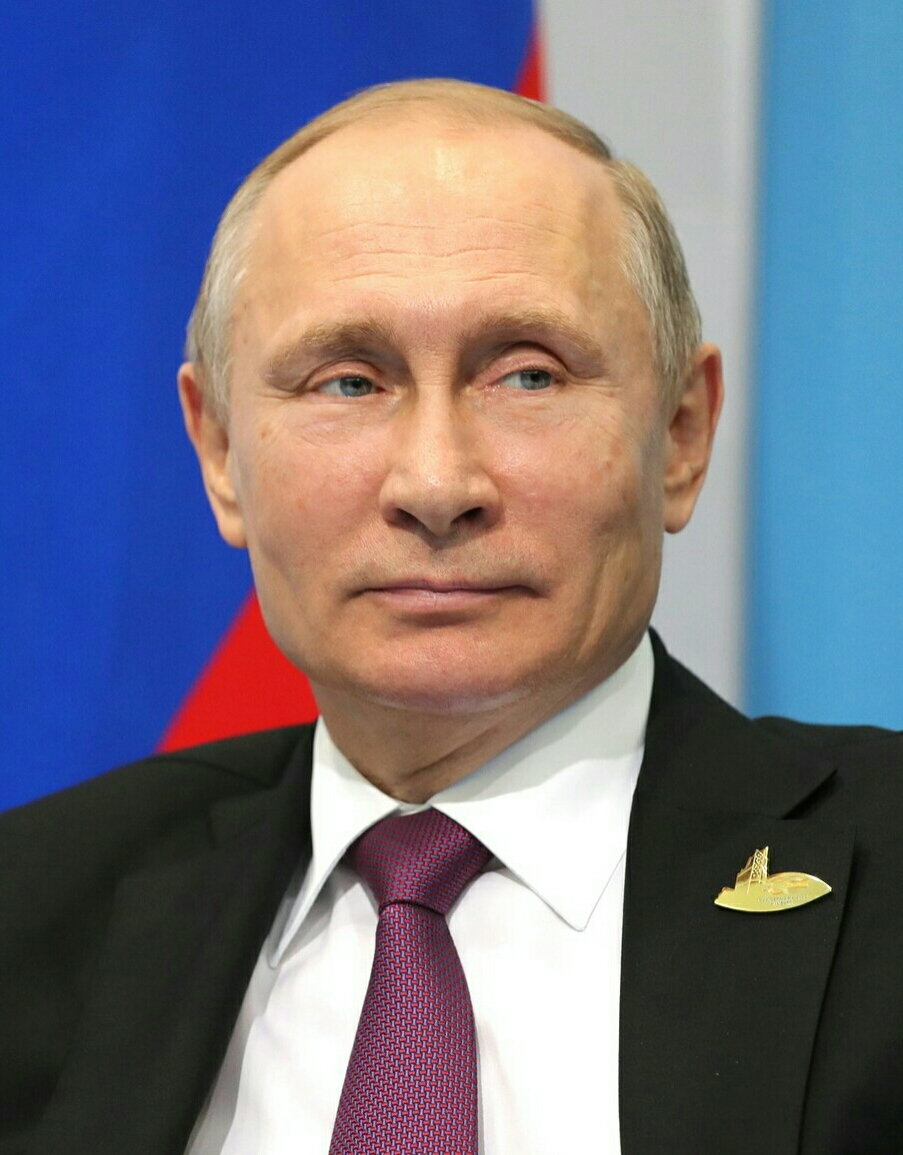
Russia
Vladimir Putin, President

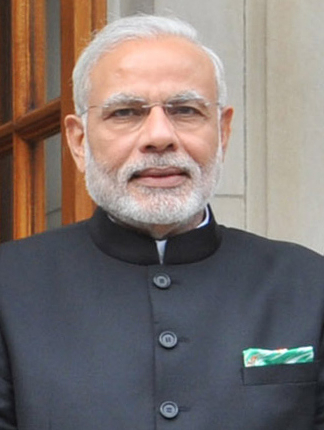
India
Narendra Modi, Prime Minister (Host)

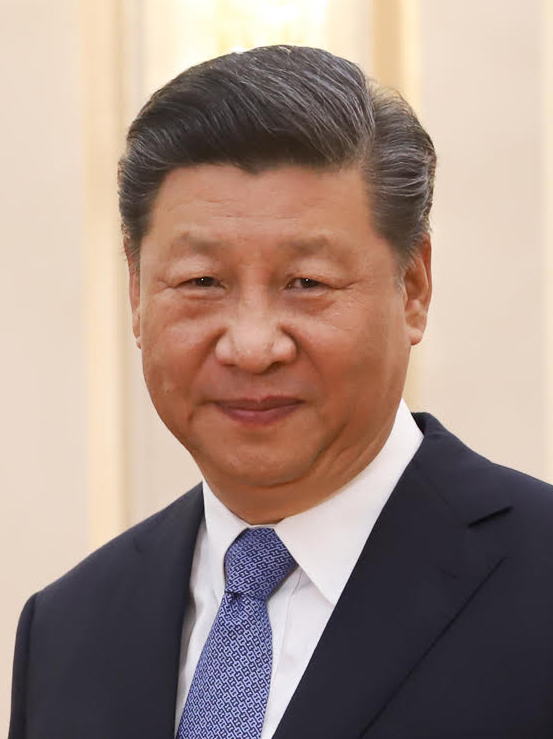
China
Xi Jinping, President

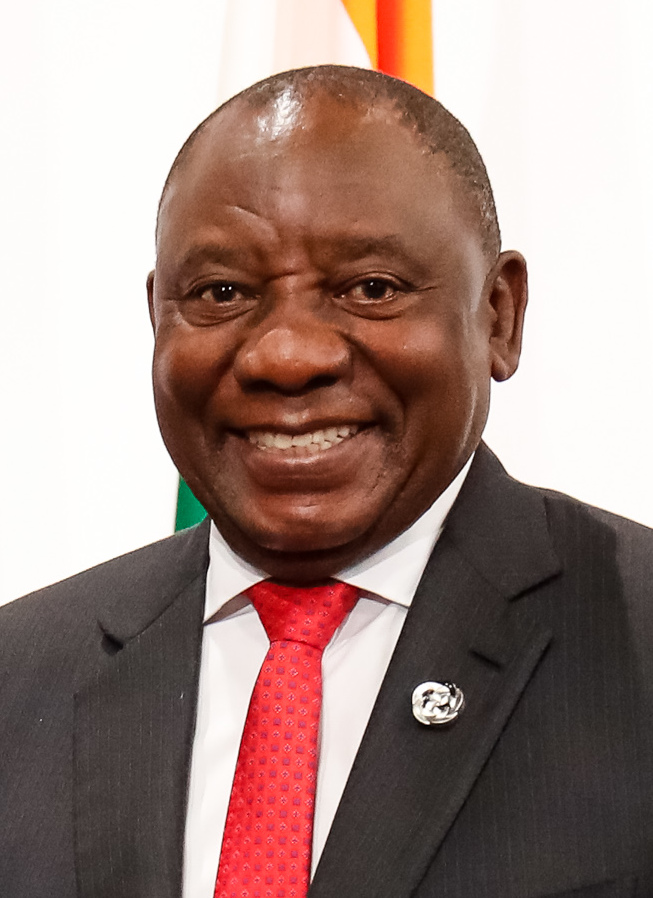
South Africa
Cyril Ramaphosa, President
