= Usha Thorat =

Indian economist (born 1950)

Deputy Governor Reserve Bank of India
- In office 10 November 2005 – 8 November 2010
- Governor: Y.V. Reddy; Duvvuri Subbarao
- Preceded by: K. J. Udeshi
- Succeeded by: Anand Sinha

Personal details
- Born: Usha Iyer; 20 February 1950 (age 76) Chennai, India
- Spouse: YSP Thorat
- Education: Lady Shri Ram College; Delhi School of Economics; Delhi University

Usha Thorat (born 20 February 1950) is an Indian economist who served as the deputy governor of the Reserve Bank of India from 10 November 2005 to 8 November 2010. Prior to this, she was the executive director of the RBI.

== Early life ==
Born 20 February 1950, in Chennai, Thorat is an alumna of the Lady Shri Ram College for Women, New Delhi and Delhi School of Economics.

== Career ==
Usha Thorat has been the Reserve Bank of India nominee on the boards of Bank of Baroda, Indian Overseas Bank and the Securities Trading Corporation of India.

She has been executive director of RBI since April 2004. As deputy governor she was responsible for the Department of Currency Management, Deposit Insurance and Credit Guarantee Corporation, Inspection Department, Premises Department, Rural Planning and Credit Department and Urban Banks Department.

She has been one of the key players in the Indian Central Bank's efforts toward promoting financial inclusion.
