= Mahesh Kumar Jain =

Indian banker

Deputy Governor of the Reserve Bank of India
- In office June 22, 2018 – June 26, 2023
- Governor: Urjit Patel; Shaktikanta Das
- Preceded by: S. S. Mundra
- Succeeded by: Swaminathan Janakiraman

Personal details
- Born: May 5, 1961 (age 65) India
- Education: (MBA) Faculty of Management Studies, University of Delhi

Mahesh Kumar Jain (born 5 May 1961) is an Indian banker who served as one of the Deputy Governor of the Reserve Bank of India from 2018 to 2023. Before that he served as the chief executive officer of the IDBI Bank.

== Career ==
Jain served as the MD & CEO of IDBI Bank before being appointed as the Deputy Governor of the Reserve Bank Of India. Before joining IDBI Bank, he headed Indian Bank.
