= Janakiraman (surname) =

Janakiraman is an Indian Tamil-language comedy drama film.

Janakiraman is also a surname. Notable people with the surname include:

- Murugavel Janakiraman, founder of Matrimony.com
- Padmapriya Janakiraman, Indian actress
- R. V. Janakiraman (1941–2019), Indian politician
- S. R. Janakiraman (born 1928), Indian vocalist
- Swaminathan Janakiraman, Indian banker
- Thi. Janakiraman (1921–1982), Indian writer
