= M. Rajeshwar Rao =

Indian officer

M.Rajeshwar Rao

Deputy Governor of the Reserve Bank of India
- In office 9 October 2020 – 8 October 2025
- Preceded by: N S Vishwanathan
- Succeeded by: Shirish Chandra Murmu

Personal details
- Born: 1961 (age 64–65)

M. Rajeshwar Rao (born 1961) is a retired Indian officer who served as Deputy Governor of the Reserve Bank of India from 9 October 2020 till 8 October 2025. Moreover, his tenure was extended on September 26, 2023, for another year, and thereafter in 2024 for an additional year.
