= Kamalesh Chandra Chakrabarty =

Indian banker (1952–2021)

Deputy Governor of Reserve Bank of India
- In office 15 June 2009 – 25 April 2014
- Governor: Duvvuri Subbarao; Raghuram Rajan
- Preceded by: V. Leeladhar
- Succeeded by: S. S. Mundra

Personal details
- Born: 27 June 1952 India
- Died: 26 March 2021 (aged 68) Mumbai
- Education: Benaras Hindu University, Varanasi
- Occupation: Banker
- Known for: Deputy Governor of Reserve Bank of India

Kamalesh Chandra Chakrabarty or K. C. Chakrabarty, (27 June 1952 – 26 March 2021) was an Indian banker who served as one of the four Deputy Governors of the Reserve Bank of India (RBI) (India's central bank) from 15 June 2009 to 25 April 2014, resigning three months ahead of the completion of his term. He was noted for his contributions to advancing financial inclusion and financial literacy during his time at the central bank.

Chakrabarty had also served in India's public sector bank, Bank of Baroda, for 26 years and also served as the chairman of Indian Bank and Punjab National Bank before being appointed the deputy governor of the Indian central bank.

== Early life ==
Chakrabarty was born on 27 June 1952 in a Bengali Brahmin family in District Kandhmala in Orissa. He was the only son of six children born to parents who migrated to India from East Pakistan after independence. He moved to Varanasi and completed most of his education in the Indian state of Uttar Pradesh. He completed his bachelor's degree in science and a master's degree in science with a specialization in statistics from the Banaras Hindu University. He was a second rank holder during his bachelor's degree and a first rank gold medalist during his master's degree. He went on to complete his Doctorate in Philosophy in statistics from the same university.

== Career ==
Chakrabarty started his career with the Banaras Hindu University as a professor, where he taught for five years, before joining the Indian public sector bank, Bank of Baroda. He worked with the bank for twenty-six years, during which he headed the United Kingdom operations of the bank between 2001 and 2004. He went on to serve as the chairman and managing director of the Indian public sector banks, Indian Bank, between 2005 and 2007, and Punjab National Bank, between 2007 and 2009.

He served as the Deputy Governor of the Reserve Bank of India between 2009 and 2014, leaving office three months prior to his term end. During this time, he was relieved of most of his responsibilities when an off-the-record comment attributed to him, had him calling out the central bank's inadequacy in controlling inflation. He was left with leadership of the Rajabhaasha (transl. official language), information technology, and customer service departments at the bank. His responsibilities were later reinstated. He also served in the Secretary's Department, Department of Banking Supervision, Financial Stability Unit, Human Resource Management Department, Rajbhasha Department, Department of Currency Management, Deposit Insurance and Credit Guarantee Corporation, Customer Service Department and the Rural Planning and Credit Department.

He resigned from the central bank's position three months before the end of his term in 2014, and later briefly shifted base to London in the United Kingdom. In 2018, he was named as a suspect by the Central Bureau of Investigation in two cases, including one relating to bad loans to the now defunct Kingfisher Airlines. A look out circular was issued that prevented him from leaving the country and flying to London.

=== Contributions ===
Chakrabarty was noted for his contribution to the field of financial inclusion and financial literacy in the country. During his role with the RBI, he advanced the financial inclusion actions of the bank aimed at driving down service costs for end customers. Some of the specific changes included loan portability that allowed for customers to transfer their loan accounts across lenders, and streamlining of foreclosure charges. He also contributed to banking regulation and supervision, championing of rights of banks' customers, microfinance institutions, SMEs, restructuring of India's Regional Rural Banks.

During his time at the central bank, he was considered to be outspoken and often expressed his views that differed from the stance of the Reserve Bank of India. He also spoke out against commercial bankers who attributed rising bad loans as 'system-generated' NPAs and had also had a public spat with the then chairman of the Indian public sector bank, Pratip Chaudhuri, over interest payable on cash reserve ratio.

=== Positions ===
Chakrabarty held these positions in his career

- Chief executive, United Kingdom operations, Bank of Baroda between 2001 and 2004
- Executive director, Punjab National Bank in 2004
- Chairman & managing director, Indian Bank between 2005 and 2007
- Chairman & managing director, Punjab National Bank between 2007 and 2009
- Deputy Governor Reserve Bank of India between 2009 and 2014

== Personal life ==
Chakrabarty was married and had a son. He died on 26 March 2021 from a heart attack at his house in Chembur in Mumbai, India. He was aged 68.
