= Swaminathan Janakiraman =

Indian banker

- Janakiraman in 2023

64th Deputy Governor of the Reserve Bank of India
- Incumbent
- Assumed office June 26, 2023
- Governor: Shaktikanta Das; Sanjay Malhotra
- Preceded by: Mahesh Kumar Jain

Personal details
- Born: 4 February 1964 (age 62) India
- Occupation: Banker, Central banker, Economist, Technocrat

Swaminathan Janakiraman (4 February 1964) is an Indian banker who served as the Managing Director State Bank of India from January 2021 until June 2023.

On 20 June 2023, he was appointed as the Deputy Governor of the Reserve Bank of India by the Government of India. He served the State Bank of India for 34 years and became a managing director.

The Central Government re-appointed Janakiraman as Deputy Governor of the Reserve Bank of India for a further two year term effective June 26, 2026, reflecting government's confidence in his leadership of India's financial regulatory framework.
