= Monetary Policy Committee (India) =

Responsible for fixing the benchmark interest rate in India

- Seal of the Reserve Bank of India

- Emblem of the Government of India

Agency overview
- Jurisdiction: Government of India
- Agency executives: Sanjay Malhotra, IAS, Governor of the Reserve Bank of India and ex-officio chairperson; Poonam Gupta, Deputy Governor of the Reserve Bank of India; Indranil bhattacharyya, Executive Director of the Bank in charge of monetary policy; Ram Singh, Director, Delhi School of Economics; Saugata Bhattacharya, Economist; Nagesh Kumar, Director and Chief Executive, Institute for Studies in Industrial Development
- Parent department: Ministry of Finance
- Parent agency: Reserve Bank of India
- Website: www.rbi.org.in/scripts/annualpolicy.aspx

The Monetary Policy Committee is responsible for fixing the benchmark interest rate in India. The meetings of the Monetary Policy Committee are held at least four times a year (specifically, at least once a quarter) and it publishes its decisions after each such meeting.

The committee comprises six members – three officials of the Reserve Bank of India and three external members nominated by the Government of India. They need to observe a "silent period" seven days before and after the rate decision for "utmost confidentiality". The Governor of the Reserve Bank of India is the chairperson ex officio of the committee. Decisions are taken by majority with the governor having the casting vote in case of a tie. The current mandate of the committee is to maintain 4% annual inflation until 31 March 2026 with an upper tolerance of 6% and a lower tolerance of 2%.

The Reserve Bank of India Act, 1934, was amended by Finance Act (India), 2016, to constitute MPC which will bring more transparency and accountability in fixing India's monetary policy. The monetary policy are published after every meeting with each member explaining his opinions. The committee is answerable to the Government of India if the inflation exceeds the range prescribed for three consecutive quarters.

== Establishment and purpose ==
Key decisions pertaining to benchmark interest rates used to be taken by the governor of the Reserve Bank of India alone prior to the establishment of the committee. The governor of RBI is appointed and can be disqualified by the government anytime. This led to uncertainty and resulted in friction between the government and the RBI, especially during the times of low growth and high inflation. Before the constitution of the MPC, a Technical Advisory Committee (TAC) on monetary policy with experts from monetary economics, central banking, financial markets and public finance advised the Reserve Bank on the stance of monetary policy. However, its role was only advisory in nature.

The setting up of a committee to decide on monetary policy was first proposed by the Urjit Patel Committee. The committee suggested a five-member MPC - three members from the RBI and two nominated by the government. The government initially proposed a seven-member committee - three from the RBI and four nominated by it. Subsequent negotiations led to the current composition of the committee, with the external members having a four-year term. After discussions, the finance ministry and RBI agreed on a six-member MPC that addressed earlier concerns of excessive government influence over monetary policy in the country.

The Reserve Bank's Monetary Policy Department (MPD) assists the MPC in formulating the monetary policy. Views of key stakeholders in the economy, and analytical work of the Reserve Bank contribute to the process for arriving at the decision on the policy repo rate. The Financial Markets Operations Department (FMOD) operationalises the monetary policy, mainly through day-to-day liquidity management operations. The Financial Markets Committee (FMC) meets daily to review the liquidity conditions so as to ensure that the operating target of monetary policy (weighted average lending rate) is kept close to the policy repo rate. Monetary Policy Committee came into force on 27 June 2016.

Suggestions for setting up a monetary policy committee is not new and goes back to 2002 when YV Reddy committee proposed to establish a MPC, then Tarapore committee in 2006, Percy Mistry committee in 2007, Raghuram Rajan committee in 2009 and then Urjit Patel Committee in 2013.

== Composition ==
The composition of the current monetary policy committee is as follows:

1. Governor of the Reserve Bank of India – Chairperson, ex officio - Sanjay Malhotra
2. Deputy Governor of the Bank in charge of monetary policy – Poonam Gupta
3. Executive Director of the Bank in charge of monetary policy – Indranil bhattacharyya
4. Ram Singh, Director, Delhi School of Economics, University of Delhi.
5. Saugata Bhattacharya, Economist.
6. Nagesh Kumar, Director and Chief Executive, Institute for Studies in Industrial Development, New Delhi.

Members referred from 4 to 6 above, will hold office for a period of four years from the date of appointment while the other three members are official. None of the central government nominees are eligible to be re-appointed.

== See also ==
- Reserve Bank of India
- Reserve Bank of India Act, 1934
