= Ambegaonkar =

Ambegaonkar (Marathi: आंबेगावकर) is a Marathi toponymic surname denoting ancestry from Ambegaon. Notable people with the surname include:

- K. G. Ambegaonkar (1902–?), Indian banker
- Mona Ambegaonkar (born 1970), Indian actress
