= Monetary policy of India =

Monetary policy is the process by which the monetary authority of a country, generally central bank controls the supply of money in the economy. In India, the central monetary authority is the Reserve Bank of India (RBI).

== Monetary policy committee ==
The Reserve Bank of India Act, 1934 (RBI Act) was amended by the Finance Act, 2016, to provide a statutory and institutionalised framework for a Monetary Policy Committee, for maintaining price stability, while keeping in mind the objective of growth. The Monetary Policy Committee is entrusted with the task of fixing the benchmark policy rate (repo rate) required to maintain inflation within the specified target level. As per the provisions of the RBI Act, three of the six Members of the Monetary Policy Committee will be from the RBI and the other three Members will be appointed by the Central Government.

The Government of India, in consultation with RBI, notified the 'Inflation Target' in the Gazette of India Extraordinary dated 5 August 2016 for the period beginning from the date of publication of the notification and ending on 31 March 2021 as 4%. At the same time, lower and upper tolerance levels were notified to be 2% and 6% respectively. Inflation rate in 2020 is 6.2% .

== Instruments of monetary policy ==
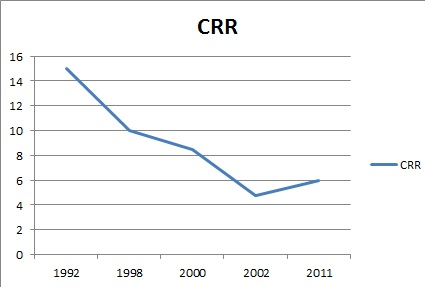
CRR graph from 1992 to 2011

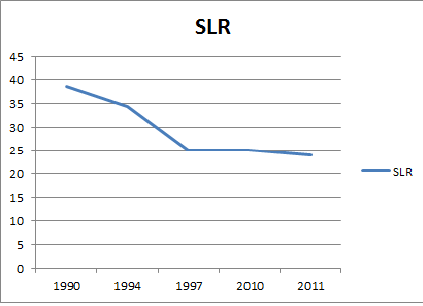
SLR graph from 1991 to 2011

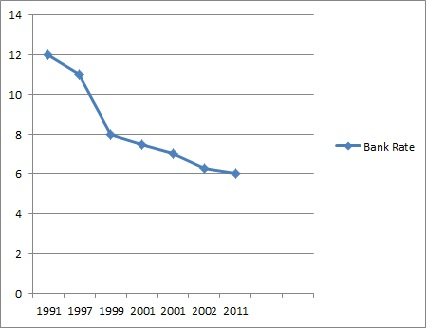
Bank rate graph from 1991 to 2011

== Key indicators ==
The key indicators as of 10 June 2024 are

Indicator	Current rate
Inflation	6.52% (23 Jan)
CRR	4.50%
SLR	18.0%
SDF	6.25%
MSF	6.75%
Bank rate	6.75%
Reverse repo rate	3.35%
Repo rate	6.5%
GDP forecast	7.00% FY25
