= Governor of the Reserve Bank of India =

Governors Central Bank of India

- भारतीय रिजर्व बैंक के गवर्नर
- Seal of the Reserve Bank of India

- Flag of India

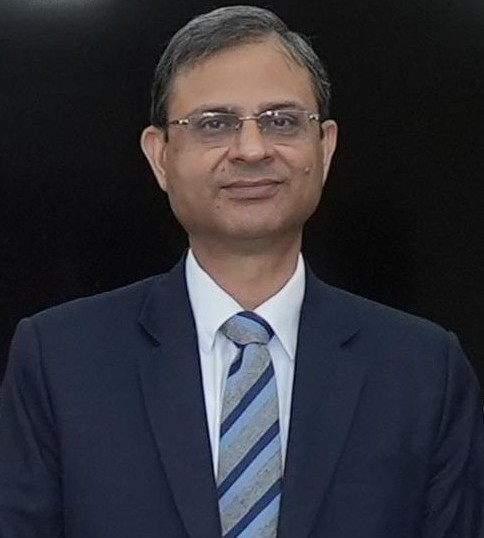
- Incumbent; Sanjay Malhotra since 11 December 2024
- Ministry of Finance; Reserve Bank of India
- Type: Chief Executive Officer
- Status: Head of RBI
- Member of: Central Board of Directors; Monetary Policy Committee; Economic Intelligence Council; Strategic Policy Group; National Security Council
- Reports to: Prime Minister of India; National Security Advisor; Finance Minister
- Residence: Malabar Hill, Mumbai, Maharashtra
- Seat: 18th Floor, Central Office Building, Shahid Bhagat Singh Road, Mumbai, 400 001
- Appointer: Appointments Committee of the Cabinet
- Term length: 5 Years (max)
- Constituting instrument: Reserve Bank of India Act, 1934
- Inaugural holder: Sir Osborne Smith
- Formation: 1 April 1935; 91 years ago
- Deputy: Deputy Governor
- Salary: ₹250,000 (US$2,700) (per month) ₹3,000,000 (US$32,000) (per year)
- Website: rbi.org.in/Scripts/governors.aspx

The governor of the Reserve Bank of India is the chief executive officer of India's central bank and the ex-officio chair of its Central Board of Directors. The Governor of RBI by convention to be considered as equivalent to the Minister of State (MoS). The Indian Rupee currency notes, issued by the Reserve Bank of India, bear the governor's signature. Since its establishment in 1935, the RBI has been headed by twenty-six governors. The governor is a member of the Strategic Policy Group headed by National Security Advisor Ajit Doval. It is a crucial wing of the National Security Council Secretariat.

The inaugural officeholder was the Australian banker Sir Osborne Smith, while Sir C. D. Deshmukh was the first native Indian governor. Sir Benegal Rama Rau was the longest-serving governor, Holding office for over seven years. while Amitav Ghosh's 20-day term is the shortest. The bank's fifteenth governor, Manmohan Singh, later became India's thirteenth prime minister. Sanjay Malhotra is the twenty-sixth governor of the Reserve Bank of India from 11 December 2024.

== Appointment process ==
The RBI Governor is appointed by the Government of India (GoI) under the provisions of the Reserve Bank of India Act, 1934. The appointment is made by the Appointments Committee of the Cabinet (ACC), headed by the Prime Minister and the Home Minister. Typically, the Governor is appointed for a term of up to five years, which may be extended or renewed for a second term. Usually the Government appoint any IAS officer or an Economist as the Governor. Till now, M. Narasimham was the only RBI officer who got empanelled to the rank of Governor.

== Duties and responsibilities of the governor ==
The RBI Governor is the chief executive authority of the Reserve Bank of India and is responsible for formulating and implementing monetary policy of India. The Governor chairs the Monetary Policy Committee, which determines key interest rates to maintain price stability while supporting economic growth.

The Governor oversees regulation and supervision of the banking and financial system in India. This includes ensuring financial stability, issuing guidelines for banks and non-banking financial companies, and taking corrective actions when required.

The RBI Governor also manages India’s foreign exchange reserves and formulates policies under the Foreign Exchange Management Act, 1999. This involves maintaining exchange rate stability and ensuring orderly development of the foreign exchange market.

Additionally, the Governor acts as the principal advisor to the National Security Advisor and the Government of India on national security, economic and financial matters. The office also handles currency issuance, payment and settlement systems, and promotes safe and efficient financial infrastructure in the country.

== Emolument, accommodation and perquisites ==
The rank of the RBI Governor is equivalent to the Minister of State (MoS). The post is accompanied by:

- Official residence at Malabar Hill, Mumbai, Maharashtra, a Type-VIII bungalow.
- Security cover as per central government rules.
- Eligibility for a diplomatic or official passport for foreign travel.
- Salary as per Pay Level 18 of the 7th Pay Commission. The Governor is entitled to receive the Dearness allowance (DA), Travel Allowance (TA) and other allowances which are determined by the GoI.

RBI Governor monthly pay and allowances
Base Salary as per 7th Pay Commission (Per month)	Pay Matrix Level	Sources
₹250,000 (US$2,700)	Pay Level 18	

== List of governors ==
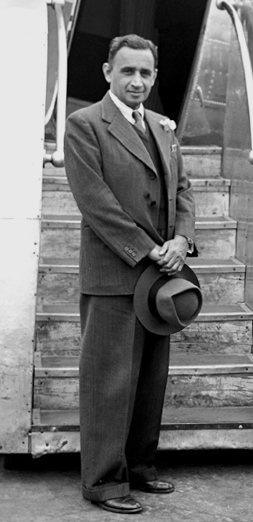
Sir C. D. Deshmukh was the first Indian to serve as the governor.

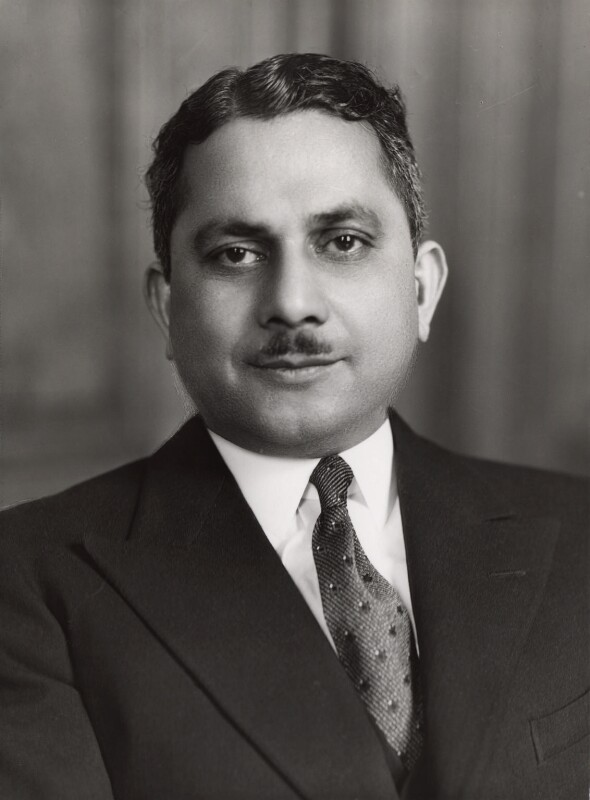
Sir Benegal Rama Rau was the longest serving governor.

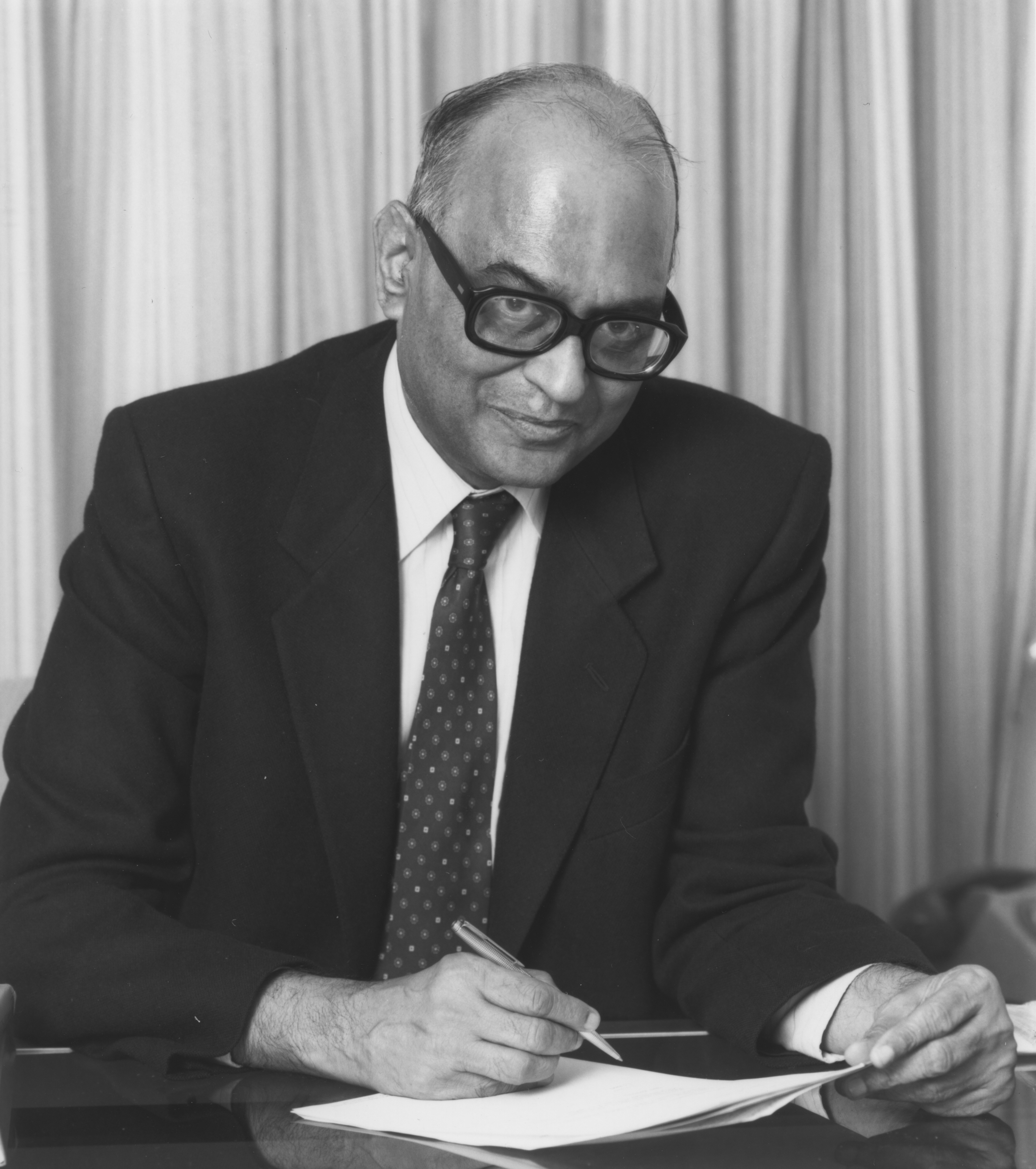
I. G. Patel, the fourteenth governor, who oversaw the demonetization of ₹5,000 and ₹10,000 value currency

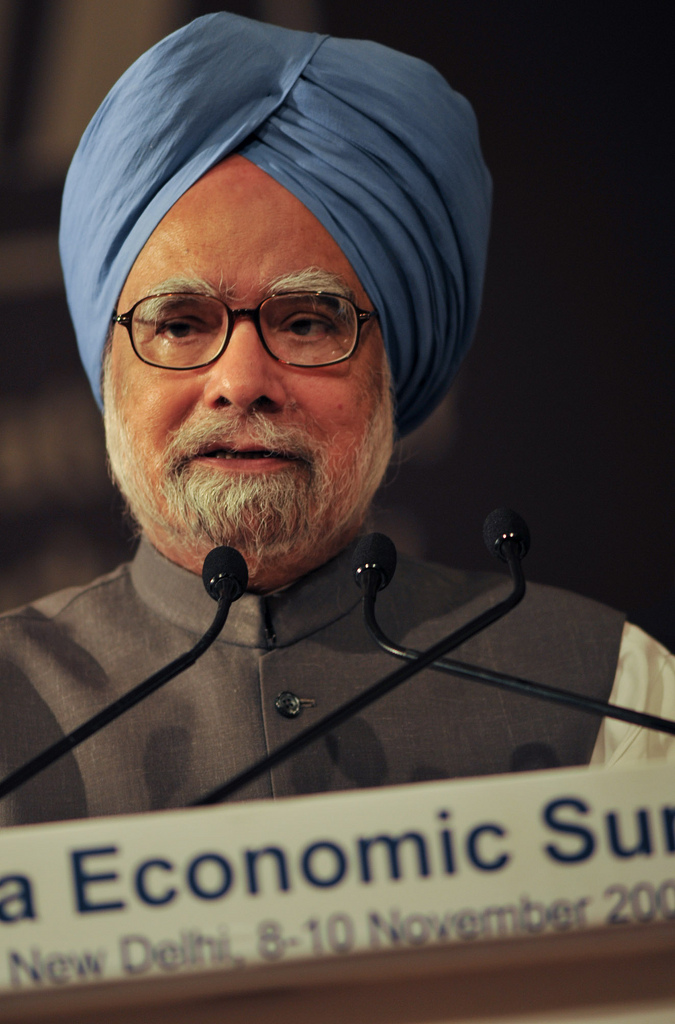
Manmohan Singh, the fifteenth governor, later served as the thirteenth Prime Minister of India

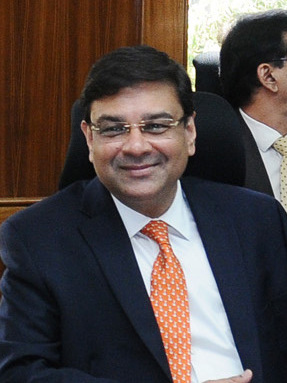
Urjit Patel, the twentyfourth governor, who oversaw the demonetization of ₹500 and ₹1000 banknotes

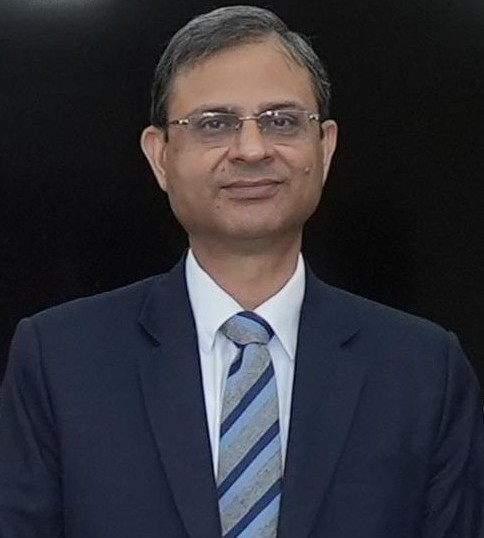
Sanjay Malhotra, the twenty-sixth and the incumbent governor

#	Portrait	Name	Term	Length of tenure	Notes	Ref
1		Sir Osborne Smith	1 April 1935 — 30 June 1937	2 years, 90 days	Smith was an Australian banker who served as the managing governor of the Imperial Bank of India before becoming the governor. He resigned the governorship before the completion of the term.	
2		Sir James Braid Taylor	1 July 1937 — 17 February 1943	5 years, 231 days	Taylor was an ICS officer who served as the controller of the currency and the deputy governor of the RBI. He died while in office.	
3		Sir C. D. Deshmukh	11 August 1943 — 30 June 1949	5 years, 323 days	Deshmukh was an ICS officer who served as the deputy governor of the RBI. He was the first Indian to serve as the governor. His governorship oversaw the partition of India as the subsequent division of assets and liabilities between the Dominion of India and the Dominion of Pakistan.	
4		Sir Benegal Rama Rau	1 July 1949 — 14 January 1957	7 years, 197 days	Rau was an ICS officer who served as the ambassador to the United States. He resigned the governorship before the completion of his second extended term.	
5		K. G. Ambegaonkar	14 January 1957 — 28 February 1957	45 days	Ambegaokar was an ICS officer who served as the Finance Secretary before becoming the deputy governor of RBI. He was appointed as the interim governor upon the resignation of Benegal Rama Rau.	
6		H. V. R. Iengar	1 March 1957 — 28 February 1962	4 years, 364 days	Iyengar was an ICS officer who served as the chairman of the State Bank of India. Indian coinage was shifted to decimal coinage during his governorship.	
7		P. C. Bhattacharya	1 March 1962 — 30 June 1967	5 years, 121 days	Bhattacharya was an Indian Audit and Accounts Service officer who served as the chairman of the State Bank of India before becoming the governor.	
8		Lakshmi Kant Jha	1 July 1967 — 3 May 1970	2 years, 306 days	Jha was an ICS officer who served as the secretary to the prime minister before becoming the governor. He left the office upon his appointment as the ambassador to the United States.	
9		B. N. Adarkar	4 May 1970 — 15 June 1970	42 days	Adarkar was an economist who served as the economic advisor to the government before becoming the deputy governor of RBI. He was appointed as the interim governor.	
10		S. Jagannathan	16 June 1970 — 19 May 1975	4 years, 337 days	Jagannathan was an ICS officer who served as India's Executive Director of the World Bank before becoming the governor. He resigned the office to become the India's Executive Director of the International Monetary Fund.	
11		N. C. Sen Gupta	19 May 1975 — 19 August 1975	92 days	Gupta served as the Secretary to the Department of Banking before becoming the interim governor.	
12		K. R. Puri	20 August 1975 — 2 May 1977	1 year, 255 days	Puri served as the chairman of the Life Insurance Corporation before becoming the governor. His governorship oversaw the formation of various regional rural banks.	
13		M. Narasimham	3 May 1977 — 30 November 1977	211 days	Narasimham was a RBI research officer who served as an Additional Secretary to the Department of Economic Affairs before becoming the governor. He is the only RBI Grade B officer who reached up to the rank of Governor.	
14		I. G. Patel	1 December 1977 — 15 September 1982	4 years, 288 days	Patel was an economist who served as a Secretary in the Ministry of Finance before becoming the governor. His governorship oversaw the demonetization of ₹5,000 and ₹10,000 value currency.	
15		Manmohan Singh	16 September 1982 — 14 January 1985	2 years, 120 days	Singh was an economist who served as the Finance Secretary before becoming the governor. His governorship oversaw various legal reforms related to the banking sector. He later became Prime Minister of India	
16		Amitav Ghosh	15 January 1985 — 4 February 1985	20 days	Ghosh was the deputy governor of RBI who was appointed as the interim governor until R. N. Malhotra assumed the office.	
17		R. N. Malhotra	4 February 1985 — 22 December 1990	5 years, 321 days	Malhotra was an Indian Administrative Services officer who served as Executive Director of the IMF before becoming the governor. His governorship oversaw the inauguration of Indira Gandhi Institute of Development Research.	
18		S. Venkitaramanan	22 December 1990 — 21 December 1992	1 year, 365 days	Venkitaramanan was an IAS officer who served as the Finance Secretary before becoming the governor. India adopted IMF's stabilization program during his governorship.	
19		C. Rangarajan	22 December 1992 — 21 November 1997	4 years, 334 days	Rangarajan is an economist who served as the deputy governor of RBI before becoming the governor. His governorship oversaw the establishment of unified exchange rate.	
20		Bimal Jalan	22 November 1997 — 6 September 2003	5 years, 288 days	Jalan is an economist who served at various positions including being the chief economic adviser to the government and serving as the Finance Secretary before becoming the governor. His governorship oversaw less inflation and interest rates.	
21		Y. V. Reddy	6 September 2003 — 5 September 2008	4 years, 365 days	Reddy is an IAS officer who served as the deputy governor of RBI before becoming the governor. During his governorship, he contributed in the financial sector reforms and external commercial borrowings.	
22		D. Subbarao	5 September 2008 — 4 September 2013	4 years, 364 days	Subbarao is an IAS officer who served as the Finance Secretary before becoming the governor. He wrote on various issues including decentralization and public finance.	
23		Raghuram Rajan	4 September 2013 — 4 September 2016	3 years, 0 days	Rajan is an economist who served as the chief economic advisor to the government and the chief economist of IMF before becoming the governor.	
24		Urjit Patel	4 September 2016 — 10 December 2018	2 years, 98 days	Patel is an economist who worked with the IMF and the central government. He served as the deputy governor of RBI before becoming the governor. His governorship oversaw the demonetization of ₹500 and ₹1000 banknotes. He later resigned citing personal reasons.	
25		Shaktikanta Das	12 December 2018 — 11 December 2024	5 years, 365 days	Das was an IAS officer who served as the Revenue Secretary and later Economic Affairs Secretary. He served as a Member of the 15th Finance Commission before becoming the governor.	
26		Sanjay Malhotra	11 December 2024 — Incumbent	1 year, 334 days	Malhotra is an IAS officer who served as the Financial Services Secretary and later Revenue Secretary before becoming the governor.	

== In popular culture ==
- In the film Governor (film), the RBI Governor was portrayed by Manoj Bajpayee, inspired by S. Venkitaramanan, the 18th Governor of the RBI.

== See also ==
- Finance Secretary of India
- Deputy Governor of the Reserve Bank of India
