= Y. V. Reddy =

Former governor of India's central bank

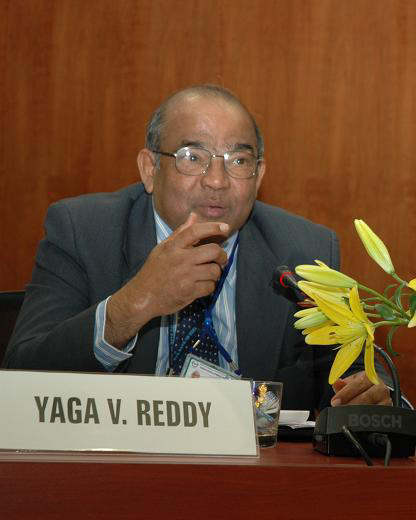
- Reddy in 2006

21st Governor of the Reserve Bank of India
- In office 6 September 2003 – 5 September 2008
- Preceded by: Bimal Jalan
- Succeeded by: Duvvuri Subbarao

41st Deputy Governor of the Reserve Bank of India
- In office 14 September 1996 – 31 July 2002
- Governor: C. Rangarajan; Bimal Jalan
- Preceded by: R. V. Gupta
- Succeeded by: Jagdish Capoor

Personal details
- Born: Yaga Venugopal Reddy; 17 August 1941 (age 84) Cuddapah district, Madras Presidency, British India
- Education: Madras University (M.A.); Osmania University (PhD)
- Occupation: Civil servant; Economist
- Awards: Padma Vibhushan (2010)
- Website: www.yvreddy.com

Yaga Venugopal Reddy (born 17 August 1941) is an Indian economist and a retired Indian Administrative Service (IAS) officer of the 1964 batch belonging to Andhra Pradesh cadre. Reddy served as governor of the Reserve Bank of India (RBI), India's central bank, from September 2003 until September 2008. In 2010, he was awarded India's second highest civilian honour, the Padma Vibhushan.

== Early life ==
Yaga Venugopal Reddy was born on 17 August 1941 in a Telugu family in Patur village, Kadapa district of present-day Andhra Pradesh, India.

== Education and honours ==
Reddy received his M.A. in economics from Madras University, India, and his PhD from Osmania University, Hyderabad. He also holds a diploma in economic planning from the Institute of Social Studies, Netherlands.

Reddy was awarded the degrees of Doctor of Letters (Honoris Causa) by Sri Venkateswara University, India; and Doctor of Civil Law (Honoris Causa) by the University of Mauritius. On 17 July 2008, he was made an Honorary Fellow of the London School of Economics.

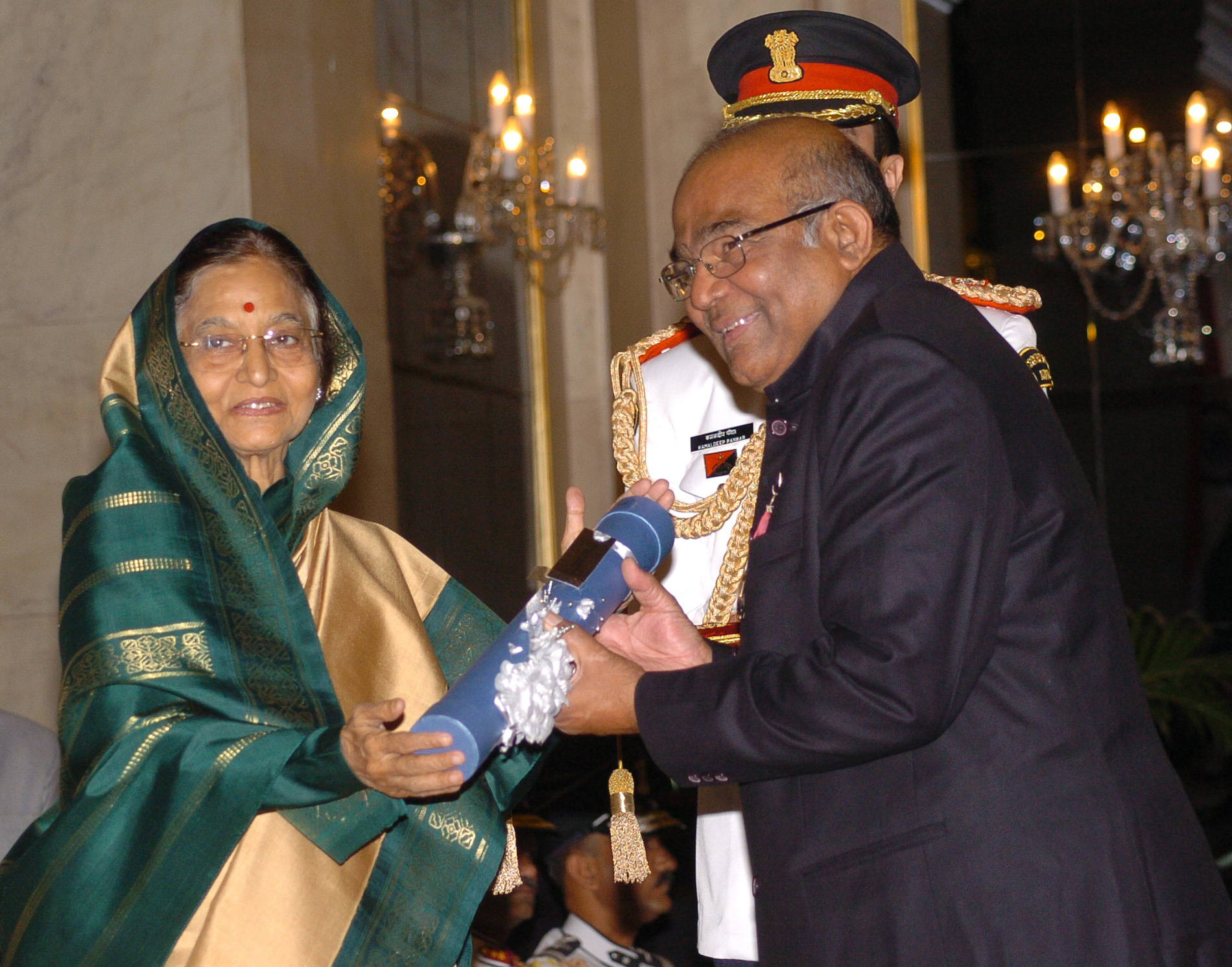
Reddy receiving his Padma Vibhushan

He has been a visiting fellow, London School of Economics, a full-time UGC Visiting Professor in Department of Business Management, Osmania University; full-time Visiting Faculty, Administrative Staff College of India and continues to be Honorary Professor at Centre for Economic and Social Studies at Hyderabad. Reddy was also Distinguished Professor of the Indian Institute of Technology (IIT) Madras.

== Positions held ==
In 1996, Reddy had been appointed deputy governor of RBI. He has also worked with the International Monetary Fund as executive director in 2002. Prior to joining the Indian Administrative Services (IAS), he worked as a lecturer from 1961.

While in the IAS, he held the positions of secretary (banking) in Ministry of Finance and principal secretary in Government of Andhra Pradesh and has worked with the governments of China, Bahrain, Ethiopia and Tanzania.

Reddy was Member of The Commission of Experts of the president of the UN General Assembly on Reforms of International Monetary and Financial System. In addition to the chair, Professor Joseph Stiglitz (USA), members of this UN Commission were drawn from Japan, Western Europe, Africa, Latin America, South and East Asia.

Reddy was president of the Indian Econometric Society during 2011. Reddy was on the advisory board of Institute for New Economic Thinking (INET). The INET advisory board includes Nobel laureates as well as other prominent economists.

Reddy was on International Advisory Board of the Columbia Program on Indian Economic Policies, Columbia University, New York. He was a Member of an informal international group of prominent persons on International Monetary Reforms. He was also on Advisory Group of eminent persons to advise the finance minister of India on G-20 issues.

He was the chairman of the Fourteenth Finance Commission of India since 3 January 2013 and served there till 25 November 2017.

Reddy was appointed the twenty-first governor of the Reserve Bank of India on 6 September 2003 and served in that position for five years.

== Contributions ==
Reddy has worked on piloting a calibrated approach to financial sector reforms.

A 19 December 2008 article in the New York Times has credited the tough lending standards he imposed on the Indian banks as RBI Governor for saving the Indian banking system from the sub-prime and liquidity crisis of 2008.

At the Reserve Bank, he was Member-Secretary of two high level committees chaired by RBI governor Dr. C. Rangarajan: one on Balance of payments and the other on Public Sector disinvestments.

Reddy was also a member of the Reserve Bank of India's Policy Group on External Debt Statistics. Reddy is credited to have played a crucial role in framing macro-economic policies that helped quarantine the country from the domino effect of the 1997 Asian financial crisis. He, along with Dr. C. Rangarajan, is also credited with the formulation of the course to be steered by the country to come out of the then Balance of Payments crisis.

In the Indian context, he was the first to use the term 'financial inclusion' in April 2005 in his Annual Policy Statement as Governor of the Reserve Bank of India. Banks were urged in the Annual Policy Statement to review their existing practices to align them with the objective of financial inclusion.

As Governor, he saw his job as making sure Indian banks did not get too caught up in the bubble mentality. He banned the use of bank loans for the purchase of raw land, and sharply curtailed securitisations and derivatives, and essentially prohibited off-balance sheet financing. He increased risk weightings on commercial buildings and shopping mall construction and increased bank reserve requirements.

In one of his interview, Joseph E. Stiglitz, Professor of Economics at Columbia University and Nobel Laureate, had said 'If America had a central bank chief like Y.V. Reddy, the US economy would not have been in such a mess.'

Less well-discussed is his work on rural banking, particularly on reviving co-operative banks and his focus on the common person. His term was marked by an emphasis on financial inclusion with the aid of information technology. He is widely consulted on many financial issues by institutions both in India as well as the world over.

== Publications ==
- Reddy, Y. V. (2010). India and The Global Financial Crisis: Managing Money and Finance. Anthem Press. ISBN 9781843318019.
- ————— (2011). Global Crisis, Recession and Uneven Recovery. Orient Blackswan. ISBN 9788125041856.
- ————— (2013). Economic Policies and India's Reform Agenda: New Thinking. Orient Blackswan. ISBN 9788125050513.
- ————— (2017). Advice & Dissent. HarperCollins. ISBN 9789352643059.
- —————; Reddy, G.R. (2018). Indian Fiscal Federalism. Oxford University Press. ISBN 9780199097043.

Reddy authored a book titled "India and The Global Financial Crisis : Managing Money and Finance" in 2009. This book provides insights into the making of public policies across a spectrum of areas between the years 2003 and 2008, a period of rapid growth of the Indian economy. He came out with a sequel "Global Crisis, Recession and Uneven Recovery" which provided a thinker and experienced policymaker's understanding of the genesis, anatomy and impact of the financial crisis, and of the lessons it offered.

Navigating through the debates between 2010 and 2012 on the effects of the 2008 financial crisis, his 2013 book "Economic Policies and India's Reform Agenda: New Thinking" reflected the confidence of Reddy who steered the nation's banks to safer waters. "Advice & Dissent" published in 2017 is Reddy's memoir.

== Speeches and remarks ==
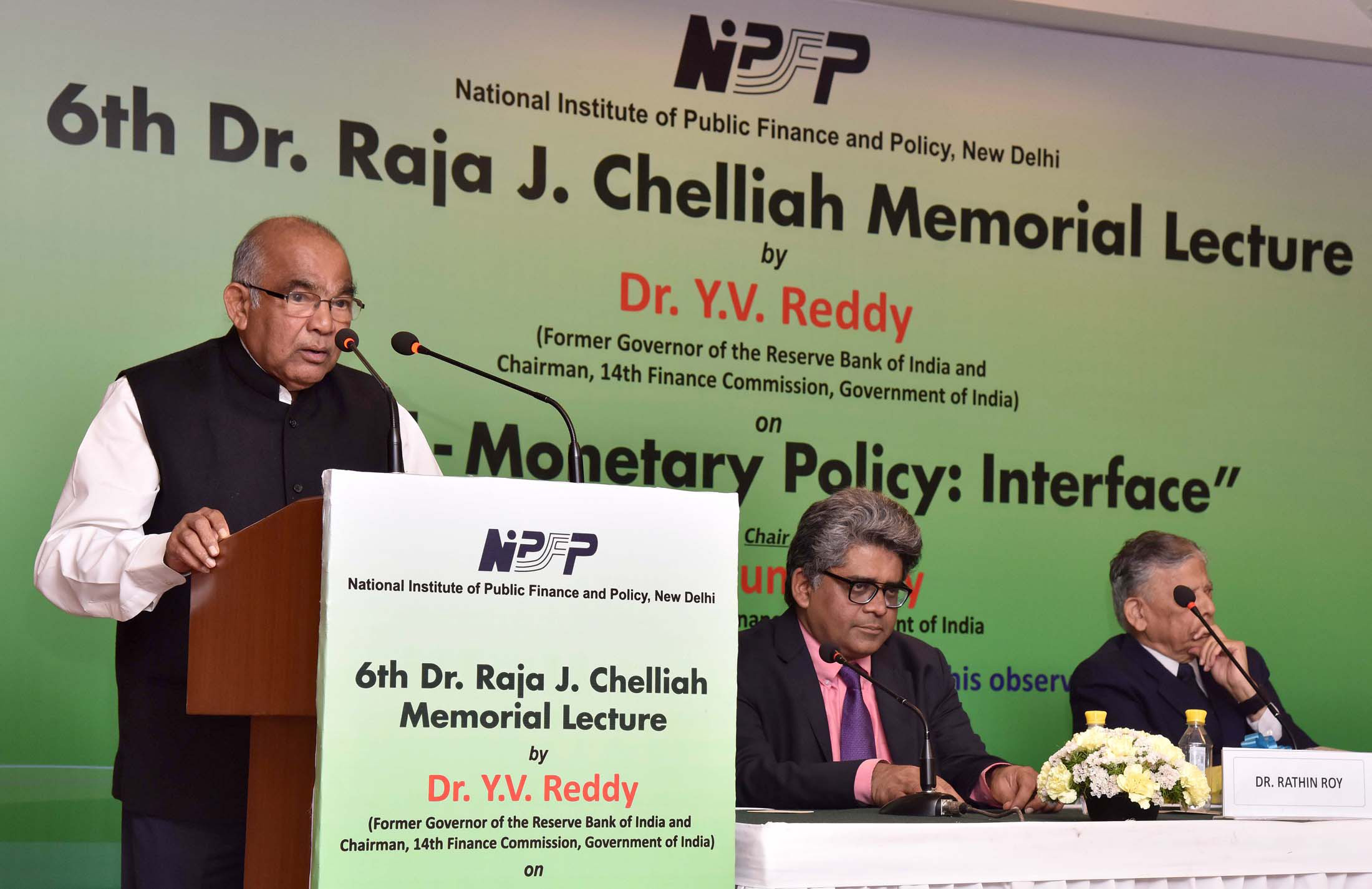
Reddy at the 6th Raja Chelliah lecture

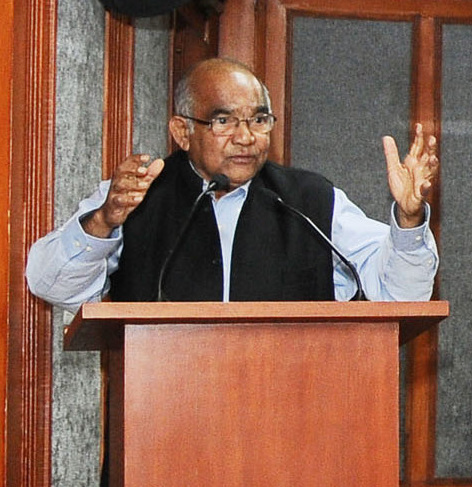
Delivering the 17th Central Vigilance Commission (CVC) lecture.

23 speeches given by Reddy during his term as RBI governor (2003 to 2008) are in the public domain. Other speeches are also in the public domain, for example:

- Capital Flows and Self Reliance Redefined (Speech). Twenty Seventh Frank Moraes Lecture. Chennai, India. 13 July 2000.
- A Tale of Two Commissions and Missing Links (Speech). Indian Economic Association 97th Annual Conference. Udaipur, India. 27 December 2014.
- Society, Economic Policies, and the Financial Sector (Speech). The Per Jacobsson Foundation Lecture. Basel, Switzerland. 24 June 2012.
- Monetary and Regulatory Policies:How to Get the Balance with Markets Right (Speech). As a panelist at the AGM panel of the Bank for International Settlements. Basel, Switzerland. 29 June 2008.

Reddy's presidential address on "A Tale of Two Commissions and Missing Links" at the 97th Annual Conference of the Indian Economic Association (IEA) in Udaipur on 27 December 2014, dwelt at length on the origin, evolution, linkages, achievements, limitations and the debates relating to the two major commissions on economic affairs in India. He also cited the success of the Chinese model where the concept of 'plan' had been replaced by 'guideline' in the country's 11th Five Year programme. He noted "The change led to China's transition from a Soviet-style planned economy to a socialist market economy and gained greater responsibility and power in overseeing China's economic development".

Reddy was invited to deliver the prestigious Per Jacobsson Foundation Lecture in June 2012 at the Bank for International Settlements in Switzerland. In this lecture on 'Society, Economic Policies and the Financial Sector', the main message he gave was that society has put its trust in central banks and as such it expects central bank to ensure trust and confidence in money and finance and serve the interest of the masses.

== In popular culture ==
Timothy Geithner, former US Secretary of the Treasury and president of Federal Reserve Bank of New York, in his book Stress Test: Reflections on Financial Crises, published in May 2014, wrote about his brief encounter with India's former Central Bank Governor Y.V. Reddy who gave him a copy of "Complications: Notes from the Life of a Young Surgeon" by Atul Gawande. [Reddy] told me it was the best book I would ever read about central banking, and the parallels with financial crisis management really are striking. It's about making life-or-death decisions in a fog of uncertainty, dealing with the constant risk of catastrophic failure.

Later while talking with Martin Wolf during his lunch with the Financial Times, Geithner mentions "It was a fascinating book, in part because he [Gawande] described how in that profession they do things that in economics we don’t that well. They have these things they call morbidity and mortality reviews every Friday, where they go over mistakes." This story received mention in several book reviews. In a book review, Sam McNerney notes Reddy's recommendation is surprising but sensible. Gawande, a surgeon by trade, has knack for elucidating the inefficiencies of modern medicine and contrasting hospital management with business management.

In another review of this book, Eric Warters write "To be clear, this book has absolutely nothing to do with central banking, at least not on the surface of it. This book is Dr. Gawande's retellings of myriad medical emergencies he encountered as a surgeon and how he managed the stress, uncertainty, and challenges that they brought on. For Geithner, the parallels were striking, as both men had to act quickly with limited information, sometimes on a hunch, with dire consequences at stake."

== Controversies ==
Reddy often courted controversy for deliberately guiding the Indian Rupee lower through verbal intervention. Some of his media talks were perceived as ill-timed.

In December 2003, Reddy was dragged into a controversy, when someone impersonating him called the then regional director of RBI Bhopal, Uma Subramaniam and asked her to lend ₹20 lakh (equivalent to ₹74 lakh or US$77,000 in 2023) for a personal emergency. Subramaniam was able to collect only INR 9,00,000 by various means which included coercing her staff members. She then handed over the money to an accomplice of the impostor. She did not get back to Reddy regarding this incident. The sensational fraud rocked and embarrassed the RBI, and infuriated Reddy, who insisted on a full inquiry.
