= James Braid Taylor =

Indian central banker

Sir James Braid Taylor KCIE
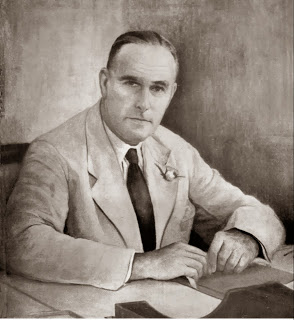

2nd Governor of the Reserve Bank of India
- In office 1 July 1937 – 17 February 1943
- Preceded by: Osborne Smith
- Succeeded by: C. D. Deshmukh

Personal details
- Born: 21 April 1891
- Died: 17 February 1943 (aged 51)
- Profession: Indian Civil Service officer

Sir James Braid Taylor, KCIE (21 April 1891 – 17 February 1943) was the second Governor of the Reserve Bank of India, holding office from 1 July 1937 until his death on 17 February 1943. He succeeded Sir Osborne Smith who was the Governor from 1 April 1935 to 30 June 1937. He was appointed a CIE in the 1933 New Year Honours List, knighted in the 1935 Silver Jubilee and Birthday Honours List and further appointed a KCIE in the 1939 Birthday Honours List.

Taylor, a member of the Indian Civil Service, served as a Deputy Controller in the Currency Department of the Government of India for over a decade. He later became the Controller of Currency, and additionally secretary in the Finance Department. He then became the Deputy Governor of the Reserve Bank and succeeded Smith as the Governor. He was closely associated with the preparation and piloting of the Reserve Bank of India Bill. He governed the bank during the war years and was involved in decision to move from a silver currency to fiat money. Even though he was the second Governor, his signature was the first to appear on the currency notes of the Indian rupee. His second term came to an end when he died in office on 17 February 1943. He was succeeded by Sir C. D. Deshmukh who became the first Indian to lead the Reserve Bank of India.
