= Poonam Gupta (economist) =

Deputy Governor of the Reserve Bank of India

Deputy Governor of the Reserve Bank of India
- Incumbent
- Assumed office 2 May 2025
- Appointed by: Appointments Committee of the Cabinet
- Governor: Sanjay Malhotra
- Preceded by: Michael Patra

Personal details
- Born: Poonam Gupta; 1969 (age 56–57) India
- Education: (B.A) (M.A); Delhi University (M.A, PhD) University of Maryland
- Occupation: Economist, Central banker, Technocrat

Poonam Gupta (born 1969) is an Indian economist who became a deputy governor of the Reserve Bank of India on 2 May 2025. When she took office, her portfolios included monetary policy, economic and policy research, financial markets operations and financial stability. She was appointed to a three-year term.

== Early life and education ==
Gupta earned a Bachelor of Economics from Hindu College at Delhi University, and a Master's degree in Economics from the Delhi School of Economics.

She also earned a master's degree and a Ph.D in economics from the University of Maryland in the United States. In addition to her academic qualifications, she has taught at the Delhi School of Economics and the University of Maryland.

== Career ==
Before her appointment at the RBI, Gupta served as the director general of the National Council of Applied Economic Research (NCAER), India's largest economic policy think tank. She has nearly two decades of experience working with the World Bank, and the International Monetary Fund (IMF).

Her academic roles include serving as a professor at the Delhi School of Economics, Visiting Faculty at the Indian Statistical Institute (ISI), RBI Chair Professor at the National Institute of Public Finance and Policy (NIPFP), and professor at the Indian Council for Research on International Economic Relations (ICRIER).

== Advisory roles ==
Gupta has also served in several prominent advisory capacities:

- Member of the Economic Advisory Council to the prime minister.
- Convener of the advisory council to the 16th Finance Commission.
- Board member of NIPFP and Global Development Network (GDN).
- Member of the World Bank's advisory groups on Poverty & Equity and the World Development Report.
- Member of the Development Advisory Committee of NITI Aayog.
- Executive Committee Member of FICCI (Federation of Indian Chambers of Commerce & Industry).
- Chair of the Task Force on Macroeconomics and Trade during India's G20 Presidency.

== Awards and research ==
Gupta's work, primarily focused on macroeconomics and emerging market economics, has appeared in leading academic journals and has been featured in international media outlets such as The Economist, Financial Times, and The Wall Street Journal.

In 1998, Gupta was awarded the EXIM Bank Award for her doctoral research in international economics.
