= K. G. Ambegaonkar =

Governor of the Reserve Bank of India

Governor of the Reserve Bank of India
- In office 14 January 1957 – 28 February 1957
- Preceded by: Benegal Rama Rau
- Succeeded by: H. V. R. Iengar

Personal details
- Occupation: Economist, Banker

Krishnanath Ganesh Ambegaonkar (born 12 August 1902), known as K. G. Ambegaokar was the fifth Governor of the Reserve Bank of India from 14 January 1957 to 28 February 1957.

== Education ==
Educated at Bombay University (BA) and University College, London, Ambegaonkar joined the Indian Civil Service in 1926, and served in various posts in the Central Provinces. He was Joint Controller of Imports from 1943 to 1944, Joint Secretary, Finance Department from 1944 to 1947, Additional Secretary, Ministry of Finance from 1948 to 1949, Secretary, Department of Economic Affairs, 1950-54. He was serving as Finance Secretary before his appointment as Deputy Governor of the RBI. On the resignation of B Rama Rau he took over as the Governor. His tenure was the third-shortest (45 days) after B. N. Adarkar (42) and Amitav Ghosh (20). Compared to the latter two Governors Ambegaonkar's signature as RBI Governor does not appear on any Indian Rupee note, but his signature as Finance Secretary appeared on the second, third, and fourth Rupee one notes issued after independence.
