= Harun Rashid Khan =

Indian banker

Haroon Rashid Khan

Deputy Governor of Reserve Bank of India
- In office 4 July 2011 – 4 July 2016
- Governor: Duvvuri Subbarao; Raghuram Rajan
- Succeeded by: N S Vishwanathan

Personal details
- Born: India
- Spouse: Rosy
- Children: 1
- Education: Utkal University, Jawaharlal Nehru University
- Occupation: Banker
- Known for: Deputy Governor of Reserve Bank of India

Harun Rashid Khan was Indian bank who was the Deputy Governor of Reserve Bank of India between 2011 and 2016.

== Early life and education ==
Khan had his early schooling at Badagada High School in Bhubaneswar. He was a brilliant student. Although he studied in the vernacular medium, he regularly won first prizes at state-level debate and elocution contests in English, and was a multiple winner of the Governor's Cup for elocution.

He completed his graduation in Political Science from BJB College, Bhubaneswar, where he stood first in the university.

Khan obtained his Master's degree in Political Science from Utkal University. Later, he obtained a Master of Philosophy degree from the School of International Studies of Jawaharlal Nehru University.

== Career ==
Khan joined the Reserve Bank of India in 1978. Between 2007 and 2008, Khan was the Director of Bank of Maharashtra and Punjab and Sind Bank. He has also been an Executive Director of RBI and Director of NABARD and later became the Principal of RBI's College of Agricultural Banking (CAB) at Pune, before getting appointed as the Regional Director of RBI, New Delhi. . He was appointed as Deputy Governor in July 2011 where he worked on internal debt management, external investment and exchange control.

Khan was the Chairman of the RBI Internal Group on Rural Credit and Microfinance, which is popularly known as the Khan Committee. Based on the recommendations of the Khan Committee, RBI prepared guidelines for expansion of the banking outreach through the Business Facilitator and Business Correspondent models with ICT support, which revolutionised the spread of financial inclusion in India.

Towards the end of his career, Khan chaired the "Working Group on Development of Corporate Bond Market in India". Its report, also popularly referred to as the "Khan Committee Report", considered various structural issues impinging on the development of a deep corporate bond market in India.

== Important assignments ==
- Chairman, RBI Internal Group on Rural Credit & Micro-finance
- Member Secretary, Committee on Ways and Means Advances for State Governments
- Convenor, Working Group on Instruments of Sterilisation
- Convenor, Working Group on Model Fiscal Responsibility & Budget Management Bill for States
- Member, G-20 Working Group on "Reinforcing International Cooperation & Market Integrity"
- Member, BIS Committee on "Global Financial System"
- Member, International Task Force on Central Counterparties
