= R Gandhi =

Indian banker

R. Gandhi

Deputy Governor of Reserve Bank of India
- In office 3 April 2014 – 3 April 2017
- Governor: Raghuram Rajan; Urjit Patel

Personal details
- Born: 1956 (age 69–70) Tamil Nadu, India
- Education: V.O.Chidambaram College, Annamalai University, American University
- Occupation: Banker
- Known for: Deputy Governor of Reserve Bank of India

Rama Subramaniam Gandhi was Deputy Governor of Reserve Bank of India from 2014 to 2017. Currently he is a freelance adviser and consultant in financial sector policy and regulation, payment systems, FinTech & currency management.

He was appointed as Deputy Governor in April 2014. During the three years in office as Deputy Governor, he held the portfolio of banking, non-banking and cooperative banking regulation, risk management (financial and operational risk management, internal control, and financial stability) and currency management. During the last year of his term, he held the portfolio of financial market regulation, foreign exchange and external reserves management, accounts, payment systems, information technology and currency management. For a brief period, he was one of the members of the first Monetary Policy Committee. As the Deputy Governor, he was Chairman of Bharatiya Reserve Bank Note Mudran Private Ltd (the currency printing subsidiary of the Reserve Bank) and Chairman of the IDRBT (a Banking technology research institute promoted by the Reserve Bank).

== Early life and education ==
R. Gandhi was born in 1956 in Devanallur, Tirunelveli, Tamil Nadu. He obtained his undergraduate degree in Economics from V.O.Chidambaram College, Thoothukudi. He obtained his post graduation in Economics from the Annamalai University. He also has post graduate level qualifications in Capital Markets and Management Information System from City University of New York and the American University respectively. Further, he also studied Gandhian Thoughts at Madurai University.

== Personal life ==
He is married and his wife is a professor of psychology and a practising counsellor. They have two sons, both of them are in the US. One is a chip design engineer and the other runs a startup in milk research technology.

== Career in RBI ==
Gandhi joined Reserve Bank of India in 1980. He worked in diverse areas including currency management and information technology and was also the Executive Assistant to the RBI Governor for more than three years. He had a brief stint at the Securities Exchange Board of India.

He was elevated to the position of Executive Director of RBI on 1 March 2011. As executive director he looked after Internal Debt Management and Currency Management, besides the strategic and crucial area of Human Resource Management. He was appointed as Deputy Governor on 3 April 2014.

== Important assignments ==
- Deputy Governor, Reserve Bank of India
- Director, Institute for Development & Research in Banking Technology
- Chairman, Bharatiya Reserve Bank Note Mudran Private Ltd
- Chairman, Working Group on IT Support for Urban Cooperative Banks
- Chairman, Panel on Regulatory Mechanism for Credit Cards
- Chairman, Working Group on Enhancing Liquidity to Government Securities & Interest Rate Derivatives Market
- Chairman, Implementation Group on OTC Derivatives Market Reforms

== See also ==
R Gandhi - Executive Profile
