= Shaktikanta Das =

Indian bureaucrat (born 1957)

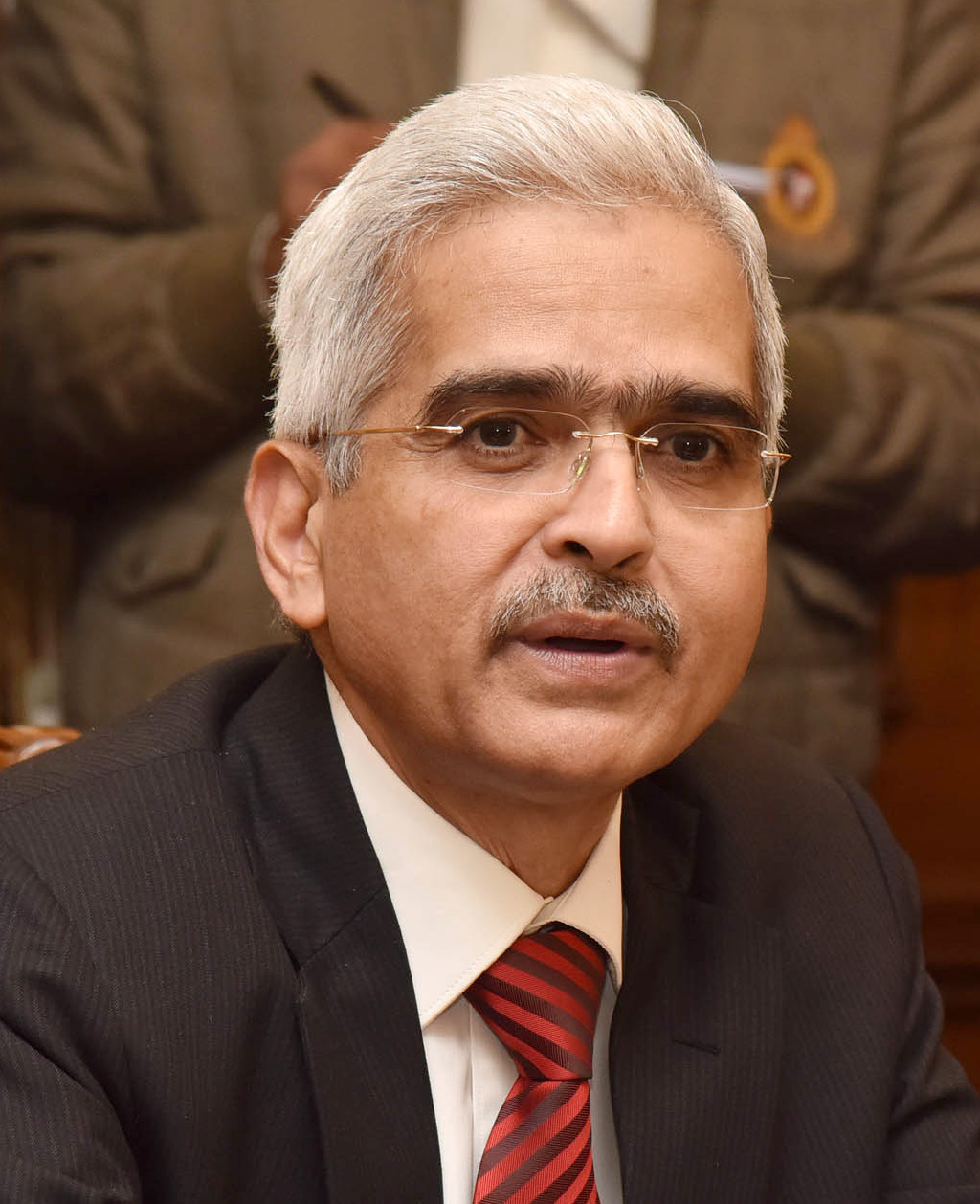
- Shaktikanta Das addressing a press conference in New Delhi on 15 December 2016

16th Principal Secretary to the Prime Minister of India
- Incumbent
- Assumed office 22 February 2025 Serving with Pramod Kumar Mishra
- Prime Minister: Narendra Modi
- Preceded by: Pramod Kumar Mishra (sole)

25th Governor of the Reserve Bank of India
- In office 12 December 2018 – 10 December 2024
- Appointed by: Appointments Committee of the Cabinet
- Preceded by: Urjit Patel
- Succeeded by: Sanjay Malhotra

Sherpa of India to the G20
- In office 27 November 2017 – 11 December 2018
- Appointed by: Appointments Committee of the Cabinet
- Prime Minister: Narendra Modi
- Minister: Arun Jaitley
- Governor: Urjit Patel
- Preceded by: Arvind Panagariya
- Succeeded by: Suresh Prabhu

Member of the Fifteenth Finance Commission
- In office 27 November 2017 – 11 December 2018 Serving with Ashok Lahiri; Anoop Chand; Ramesh Chand
- Appointed by: President of India (then, Ram Nath Kovind)
- Chairman: N. K. Singh
- Succeeded by: Ajay Narayan Jha

Economic Affairs Secretary
- In office 31 August 2015 – 28 May 2017
- Appointed by: Appointments Committee of the Cabinet
- Minister: Arun Jaitley
- Preceded by: Rajiv Mehrishi
- Succeeded by: Subhash Chandra Garg

Revenue Secretary
- In office 16 June 2014 – 31 August 2015
- Appointed by: Appointments Committee of the Cabinet
- Minister: Arun Jaitley
- Preceded by: Rajiv Thakur
- Succeeded by: Hasmukh Adhia

Fertilizers Secretary
- In office 26 December 2013 – 15 June 2014
- President: Ram Nath Kovind; Droupadi Murmu
- Prime Minister: Narendra Modi
- Preceded by: Rajiv Mehrishi
- Succeeded by: Jugal Kishore Mohapatra

Personal details
- Born: 26 February 1957 (age 69) Bhubaneswar, Odisha, India
- Children: Anwesha Das
- Relatives: Prananath Patnaik (uncle)
- Education: Delhi University (BA, MA); Utkal University (D.Litt)
- Occupation: Retired IAS officer
- Profession: Civil servant

Shaktikanta Das (born 26 February 1957) is an Indian bureaucrat and retired Indian Administrative Service officer who is currently serving as the 16th Principal Secretary to the Prime Minister of India. He previously served as the 25th Governor of the Reserve Bank of India. He was also a member of the Fifteenth Finance Commission and India's sherpa to the G20.

While serving as an IAS officer, Das held several positions for the Government of India and Government of Tamil Nadu, including as the Economic Affairs Secretary, Revenue Secretary, and the Fertilizers Secretary. Additionally, he has held the positions of Alternate Governor for India at the World Bank, ADB, NDB and AIIB. He has represented India in a number of international forums like the IMF, G20, BRICS, and SAARC.

== Early life and education ==
Das was born in Bhubaneswar to a modest Karan family. He is the nephew of the prominent Odia freedom fighter, socialist leader and legislator Prananath Pattnaik. Das attended the Demonstration Multipurpose School, Bhubaneswar, and then attained a bachelor's (BA) and a master's degrees (MA) in History from St. Stephen's College, University of Delhi. He has a postgraduate degree in public administration from the University of Birmingham. He also completed a course in financial management from the Indian Institute of Management, Bangalore, and received mid-career training from the Indian Institute of Management, Ahmedabad. In recognition of his contributions to public administration, he was awarded an honorary Doctor of Letters (D.Litt.) by Utkal University in 2021.

== Indian Administrative Services career ==
Das joined the Indian Administrative Service in 1980 as part of the Tamil Nadu cadre. Das served the Government of India and the Government of Tamil Nadu in a number of capacities, including as Principal Secretary (Department of Industries (Tamil Nadu)), Special Commissioner (Department of Revenue (Tamil Nadu)), Secretary (Revenue), Secretary Commercial Taxes, the project director of Tamil Nadu State AIDS Control Society and as the district magistrate and collector of Dindigul and Kancheepuram districts in the Tamil Nadu government.

Das has also served as the Union Economic Affairs Secretary, Union Revenue Secretary, Union Fertilizers Secretary, Special secretary in the Department of Economic Affairs of the Ministry of Finance and as a joint secretary in the Department of Expenditure of the Ministry of Finance in the Indian government. While he was Joint Secretary, he worked briefly for Mahindra World City, a deputation to a private sector organisation provided for by IAS rules. Additionally, he has held the positions of Alternate Governor for India at the World Bank, ADB, NDB and AIIB. He has represented India in a number of international forums like the IMF, G20, BRICS, and SAARC.

=== Revenue Secretary ===
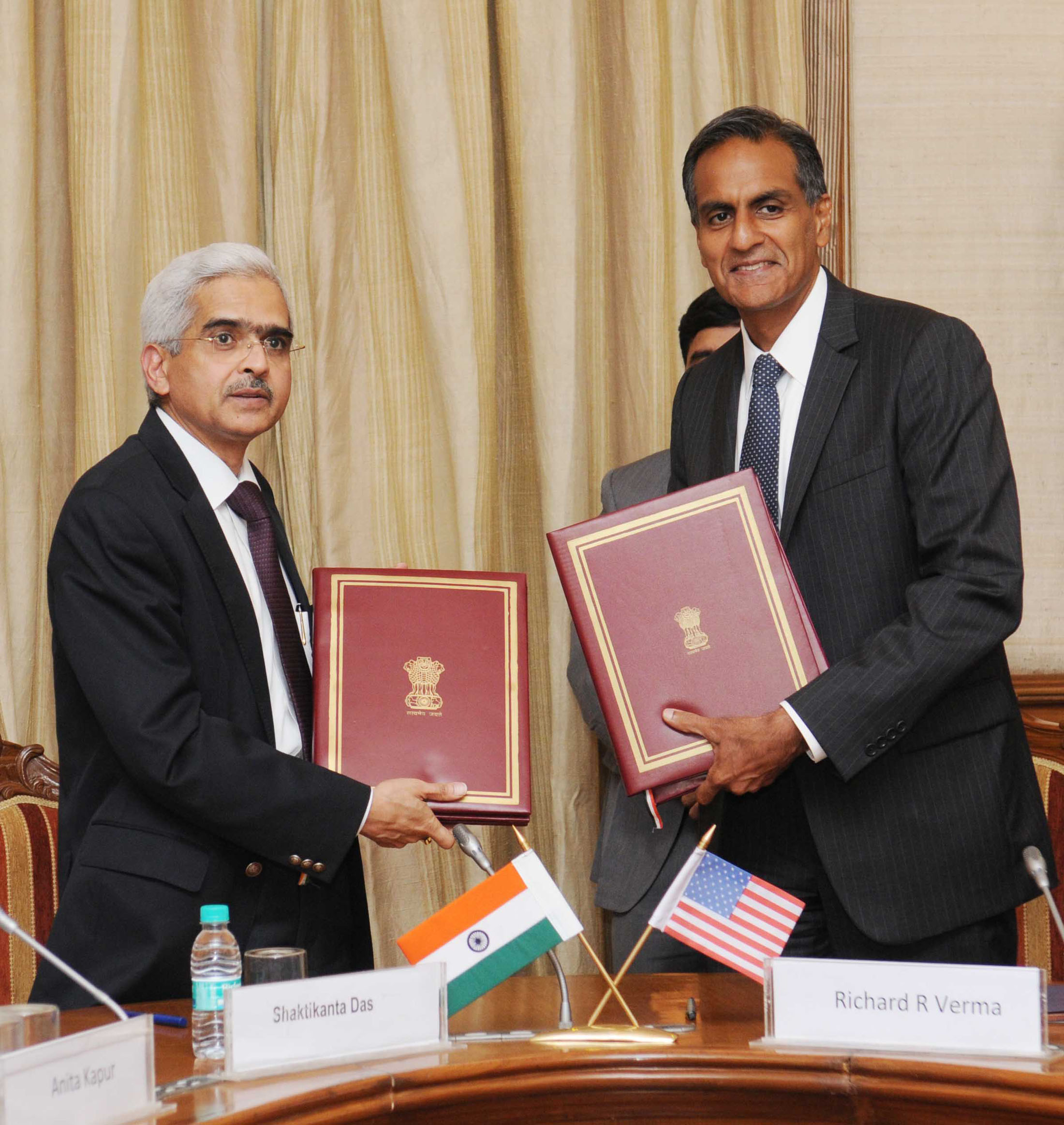
Das (left) with the United States ambassador to India Richard Verma (right) on the signing of FATCA in New Delhi on 9 July 2015

In June 2014, the Prime Minister-led-Appointments Committee of the Cabinet (ACC) named Das as the Union Revenue Secretary. His tenure started on 16 June 2014, and concluded on 31 August 2015.

=== Economic Affairs Secretary ===
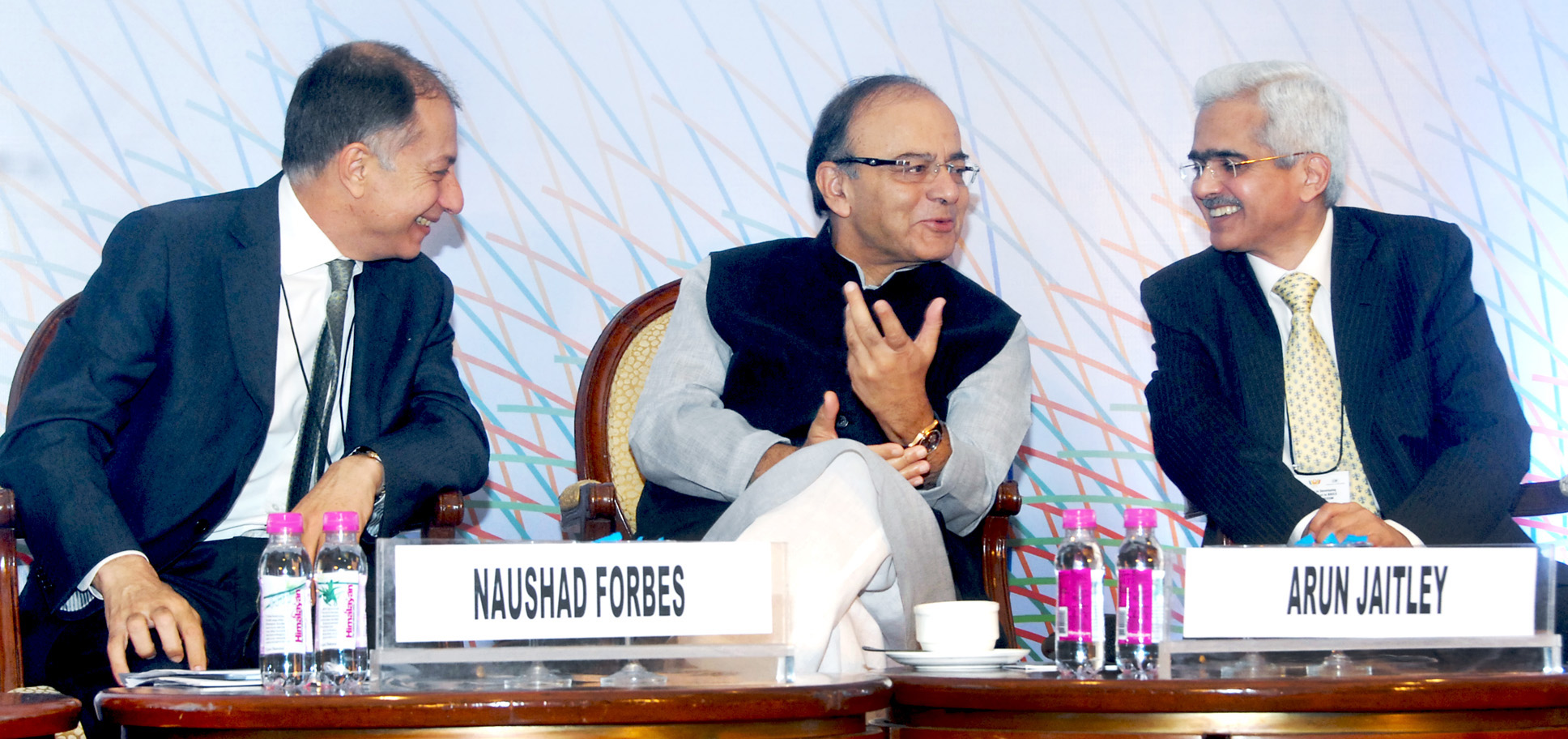
Das (right) with Minister of Finance Arun Jaitley (centre) and the president of Confederation of Indian Industry, Naushad Forbes (left)

Das was appointed Union Economic Affairs Secretary by the ACC in August 2015. He assumed the office of Secretary on 31 August 2015, and admitted it and simultaneously superannuated from service on 28 May 2017 after being given a three-month extension by the government.

On 8 November 2016, the Government of India announced the demonetisation of all ₹500 and ₹1,000 banknotes with the objective of increasing cashless transactions and reducing the use of illicit and counterfeit cash. Das was the senior Department of Economic Affairs official in the finance ministry during the planning and implementation phase of the initiative and was widely reported as one of the principal government officials coordinating the administrative response. Das was also among the senior officials in the Ministry of Finance during the roll out of the Goods and Services Tax and worked in drawing up the legislation and coordinating with the states for implementing the tax, which took effect on 1 July 2017.

=== Post-retirement ===
After his retirement from the IAS, Das was appointed a member of the Fifteenth Finance Commission by the ACC. In addition, he was appointed as India's Sherpa to the G20 by the ACC. In December 2018, on his appointment as the Governor of the Reserve Bank of India, Das resigned from his position in the Fifteenth Finance Commission.

== Governor of the Reserve Bank of India ==
On 11 December 2018, Das was appointed Governor of the Reserve Bank of India (RBI) by the Appointments Committee of the Cabinet (ACC) for a three-year term. His predecessor Urjit Patel had resigned the day before. Das received an extension in December 2021 for a period of three years. As RBI governor, Das served as the ex-officio chairperson of the Monetary Policy Committee of the central bank.

=== Responses ===
Das's appointment as RBI governor received mostly positive responses, with DBS Bank's head of markets for India at Singapore, Ashish Vaidya, saying that previous governors of the RBI with an IAS background, such as Y. Venugopal Reddy and Duvvuri Subbarao, had been successful and that Das's "cordial relations with the government would likely help policy negotiations." S. S. Mundra, a former deputy governor of the RBI, said Das was a "good and balanced choice" for RBI governorship and had "a good understanding of the whole of the financial sector both from the ministry and also in his interactions with the RBI." A former Governor of the Reserve Bank of India, C. Rangarajan, said Das had "experience in economic affairs" and would "make a good governor". Gaurang Shah, a senior vice president at Geojit Financial Services, said "a name like Shaktikanta Das carries track record, experience, credentials, credibility and respect along with him."

Industry bodies like Federation of Indian Chambers of Commerce & Industry (FICCI) and Confederation of Indian Industry (CII) described the appointment as a "great choice", citing his administrative experience, familiarity with India's financial issues, and participation in international forums such as the G20. Reactions of the markets was also positive, with BSE SENSEX gaining 629 points and NIFTY 50 increasing by 188 points.

On the other hand, Nobel laureate and professor at the Massachusetts Institute of Technology, Abhijit Banerjee, said Das's appointment posed a lot of "frightening" questions on governance of autonomous public institutions. Subramanian Swamy, a member of the Bharatiya Janata Party, the largest party of the ruling National Democratic Alliance coalition, and a nominated member of the Rajya Sabha (Council of the States), criticised Das, calling him a "corrupt person" at an event at the Indian School of Business in Hyderabad.

He also became the subject of widespread commentary and jokes on social media. On Twitter, some users joked about his MA in History with quips wondering if he would turn the RBI "into history" and asking him history-quiz questions like the date of the Battle of Haldighati. Google Trends data indicated that searches related to Das's educational qualifications surged immediately following the announcement of his appointment.

=== Initiatives ===
In March 2020, as the COVID-19 pandemic disrupted economic activity, the RBI under Das took a sequence of emergency actions to preserve credit flows and inject system liquidity. The central bank's Monetary Policy Committee held an emergency meeting on 27 March 2020 and cut the policy repo rate by 75 basis points, including a 3-month moratorium on term loans. By May 2020, the central bank had cumulatively reduced the repo rate by 115 bps over two months, injected liquidity equivalent to 8.7% of India's GDP, and introduced targeted relief to strengthen transmission and financial stability.

One of Das's first major challenges was addressing the liquidity crisis in the non-banking financial company (NBFC) sector following the IL&FS default in 2018. In October 2021, the RBI, issued a scale-based regulatory framework for NBFCs, reorganising supervision according to size, activities and systemic importance and imposing enhanced governance, disclosure and prudential standards for larger NBFCs, along with stricter norms to curb excessive risk-taking.

The RBI continued to prioritise digital payment infrastructure under Das. Unified Payments Interface (UPI) became the dominant retail payment method by volume and value, based on NPCI statistics. According to the International Monetary Fund, UPI has averaged growth rates of 160% annually since its launch in 2016. During an address at the Grand Finale of the G20 TechSprint 2023, Das said that UPI has become the backbone of digital payments in India and has helped to catalyse a wave of innovations in the fintech sector. By mid-2024, over 14 billion transactions per month were recorded by UPI and transaction values regularly surpassing ₹20 trillion. The RBI also launched limited pilot programmes for a retail central bank digital currency (e₹) on 1 December 2022, operating initially within closed user groups to test issuance, distribution and use cases.

== Principal Secretary to the Prime Minister of India ==
In February 2025, Das was appointed as the second Principal Secretary to the Prime Minister of India, Narendra Modi. He is serving alongside Pramod Kumar Mishra, who was appointed in 2019, as the Principal Secretary to the Prime Minister.

== Awards ==
For his efforts to strengthen the banking sector, he was given the Central Banker of the Year, Asia-Pacific 2020 award by the London-based publication The Banker. Das was honoured with the title of 'Governor of the Year 2023' from Central Banking, a financial newspaper also located in London. He was rated "A+" in the Global Finance Central Banker Report Cards 2023 and 2024 consecutively. Das was placed at the top of the list of three central bank governors who have been rated A+.

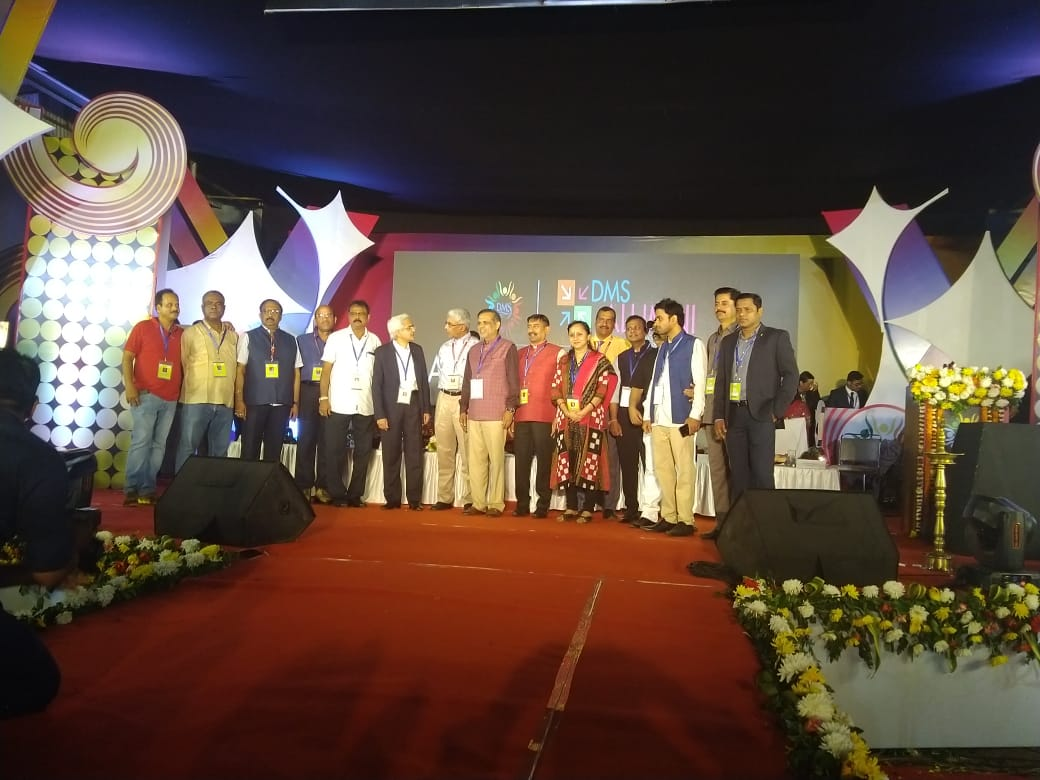
Das as the chief guest at the alumni meet of his school
