= Jagdish Capoor =

Former Deputy Governor of the Reserve Bank of India

Mr. Jagdish R. Kapoor is a former Deputy Governor of Reserve Bank of India. He is also the Chairman of Manappuram Finance Limited. Reserve Bank of India.

== Early life and education ==
Mr. Jagdish Kapoor holds a master's degree in commerce from the University of Agra. He is also a Fellow of the Indian Institute of Banking and Finance.

== Career in RBI ==
Capoor retired from RBI on 30 June 2001. After retirement, he joined HDFC Bank as the chairman.

== Post Retirement Career ==
Jagdish Kapoor's commercial affiliation post retirement reads like a Who is Who of the Indian financial industry. He has been the Chairman of Agricultural Finance Corporation Ltd and Assets Care Enterprise Ltd; Chairman of HDFC Bank, Chairman of BSE Ltd, Chairman of Deposit Insurance and Credit Guarantee Corporation, Chairman of Bharatiya Reserve Bank Note Mudran Ltd, Additional Director of Entegra, Director of The Indian Hotels Company Limited, Director of Vikas GlobalOne Limited, Director of Agricultural Finance Corporation, and Assets Care Enterprise Limited. He also serves on the Boards of the LIC Pension Fund Ltd., Quantum Trustee Co. Pvt. Ltd, LIC Housing Finance Ltd. He is on the Board of Governors of Indian Institute of Management Indore. Jagdish Capoor has been a Director of Manappuram Finance Ltd. since 20 July 2010.

== See also ==
- Capoor's Profile on Forbes
- Asset Care - Board of Directors
- SEBI's MAPIN Review Panel
