= Reserve Bank of India Act, 1934 =

Act of Imperial Legislative Council of India

Imperial Legislative Council
- Long title: An Act to constitute a Reserve Bank of India
- Citation: Act No. 2 of 1934
- Territorial extent: Whole of India
- Enacted by: Imperial Legislative Council
- Enacted: 6 March 1934
- Commenced: 1 April 1935
- Status: In force

The Reserve Bank of India Act, 1934 is the legislative act under which the Reserve Bank of India (RBI) was formed. This act along with the Companies Act, which was amended in 1936, were meant to provide a framework for the supervision of banking firms in India.

== Summary ==
The act contains the definition of the so-called scheduled banks, as they are mentioned in the second schedule of the act. These are banks which were to have paid up capital and reserves above 5 lakh.

== Sections ==
There are various section in the RBI Act but the most controversial and confusing is Section 7. Although this section has been used only once by the central govt, it puts a restriction on the autonomy of the RBI. Section 7 states that the central government can legislate the functioning of the RBI through the RBI board, and the RBI is not an autonomous body.

Section 17 of the act defines the manner in which the RBI can conduct business as the central bank of India. The RBI can accept deposits from the central and state governments without interest. It can purchase and discount bills of exchange from commercial banks. It can purchase foreign exchange from banks and sell it to them. It can provide loans to banks and state financial corporations. It can provide advances to the central government and state governments. It can buy or sell government securities. It can deal in derivative, repo and reverse repo.

Section 18 deals with emergency loans to banks.

Section 21 states that the RBI must conduct banking affairs for the central government and manage public debt.

Section 22 states that only the RBI has the exclusive rights to issue currency notes in India.

Section 24 states that the maximum denomination a note can be is ₹10,000 (US$100).

Section 26 of Act describes the legal tender character of Indian bank notes.

Section 28 allows the RBI to form rules regarding the exchange of damaged and imperfect notes.

Section 31 states that in India, only the RBI or the central government can issue and accept promissory notes that are payable on demand. However, cheques, that are payable on demand, can be issued by anyone.

Section 42(1) says that every scheduled bank must have an average daily balance with the RBI. The amount of the deposit shall be more than a certain percentage of its net time and demand liabilities in India.
