= Duvvuri Subbarao =

Indian economist (born 1949)

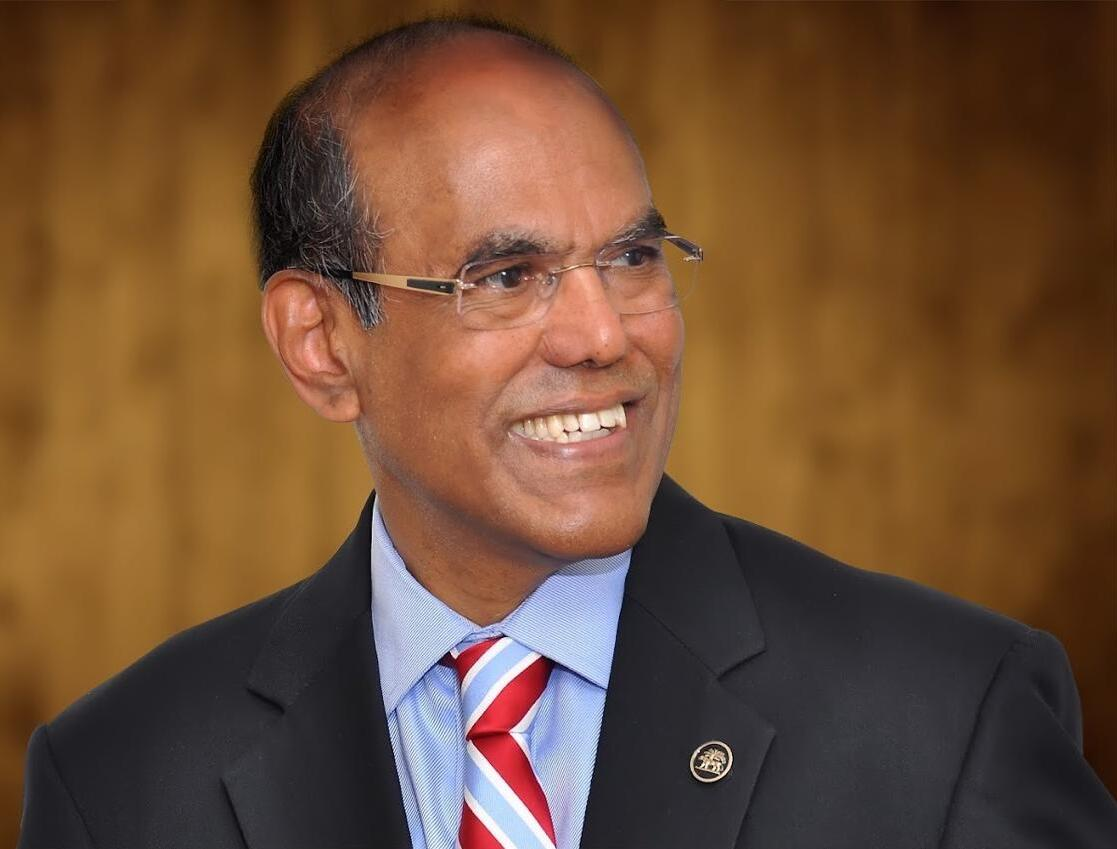
- Subbarao in 2025

22nd Governor of the Reserve Bank of India
- In office 5 September 2008 – 4 September 2013
- Prime Minister: Manmohan Singh
- Preceded by: Y. V. Reddy
- Succeeded by: Raghuram Rajan

Finance Secretary of India
- In office 4 July 2007 – 5 September 2008
- Succeeded by: Arun Ramanathan

Secretary, Economic Advisory Council
- In office 2005 - 2007
- Minister: Manmohan Singh

Lead Economist, World Bank
- In office 1999 - 2004

Finance Secretary of Andhra Pradesh
- In office 1993 - 1998
- Minister: N Chandrababu Naidu

District Collector of Prakasam
- In office 1982 - 1983

District Collector of Khammam
- In office 1979 - 1979

Sub Collector of Parvathipuram District
- In office 1979 - 1979

Personal details
- Born: 11 August 1949 (age 77) Kovvuru, Andhra Pradesh, India
- Education: IIT Kharagpur (BSc); IIT Kanpur (MSc); Ohio State University (MS); Massachusetts Institute of Technology (Humphrey Fellow); Andhra University (PhD)
- Profession: Civil servant, Economist
- Known for: Governor of Reserve Bank of India

Duvvuri Subbarao (born 11 August 1949) is an Indian economist, central banker, and retired IAS officer. He served as the 22nd Governor of the Reserve Bank of India (RBI) from 2008 to 2013, with an extension granted in 2011 under Prime Minister Manmohan Singh. After leaving the RBI, he became a Distinguished Visiting Fellow at the National University of Singapore, and later at the University of Pennsylvania.

== Early life ==
Subbarao was born on 11 August 1949 in Eluru, in the West Godavari district, Andhra Pradesh. He attended Sainik School, Korukonda, and Andhra Pradesh from 1962 to 1965. He completed his BSc (Honors) program in Physics at the Indian Institute of Technology Kharagpur in 1969, followed by an MSc in Physics from the Indian Institute of Technology, Kanpur. Subbarao passed the Civil Services Examination in 1972, joining the Andhra Pradesh cadre of the Indian Administrative Service (IAS), 1972 batch.

From 1977 to 1978, Subbarao took study leave to earn a master degree in economics from Ohio State University. He was a Humphrey Fellow at MIT (1982–83), studying public finance. In 1988, he obtained a PhD in economics from Andhra University with a doctoral thesis titled Fiscal Reforms at the Sub-National Level.

== Career ==
Subbarao's early career included field postings in Andhra Pradesh. As the Collector of the Khammam District in 1979, he implemented the Land Transfer Regulation, which primarily involved restoring land to tribal households that had lost it due to indebtedness, as stipulated by protective legislation. As managing director of the Andhra Pradesh State Finance Corporation (1986–1988), he supported small-scale industrial and service sector initiatives.

Subbarao was on deputation to the Government of India as a joint secretary in the Ministry of Finance, where he helped formulate and implement the 1991 reforms. From 1993 to 1998, he served as the Finance Secretary to the Government of Andhra Pradesh. He contributed to the state government's decision to publish a white paper in 1996 on state finances, which garnered popular support for economically difficult reforms.

From 1999 to 2004, he worked as a Lead Economist at the World Bank, where he promoted public expenditure reforms in developing countries. He also led the Bank's study on decentralization in East Asia.

Upon returning to India from the World Bank, he was appointed to the Prime Minister's Economic Advisory Council (2005–2007), before becoming the Finance Secretary in 2007. On 5 September 2008, he was appointed Governor of the Reserve Bank of India (RBI), becoming the first serving civil servant and the first person born after Independence to hold the post. Arun Ramanathan was appointed as Finance Secretary on 21 September 2008, filling Subbarao's vacancy. Subbarao's term as RBI Governor was extended for two years in 2011.

== Achievements ==
As Finance Secretary to the Government of India, Subbarao questioned the allocation of valuable 2G spectrum licenses to telecom operators in 2007 at prices set in 2001. He argued for fresh bidding to determine the current market value. He later testified in the CBI case regarding alleged corruption by ministers and civil servants in the allocation of 2G spectrum, with the judge citing his testimony in the judgment.

His tenure as RBI Governor coincided with the global 2008 financial crisis. He introduced liquidity and monetary measures to stabilize the economy and later faced challenges of inflation and currency depreciation linked to U.S. quantitative easing.

During his term, Subbarao emphasized the autonomy of the central bank, increased public engagement on monetary policy, promoted financial inclusion initiatives, open communication channels with stakeholders and outreach to the public. He helped ensure financial inclusion in the Ernakulam district of Kerala. Subbarao is known for his theory of the New Trilemma of central bankers, referring to the "Holy Trinity" of price stability, financial stability, and sovereign debt sustainability as opposed to the well-known "impossible trinity" of the Mundell's of a fixed exchange rate, free capital flows, and independent monetary policy. Subbarao's exposition of the holy trinity has established the Indian perspective in the debate on the global central banking trilemma.

== Personal life ==
Subbarao is married to Urmila Subbarao. They have two sons, Mallik and Raghav, both of whom are graduates of the Indian Institutes of Technology (IIT).

== Works ==
Who Moved My Interest Rate?: Leading the Reserve Bank of India Through Five Turbulent Years, was published in July 2016.

His autobiography, Just A Mercenary?: Notes from My Life and Career, was published in 2024.
