= Sanjay Malhotra =

Governor of the Reserve Bank of India (RBI) since 2024

Shri Sanjay Malhotra
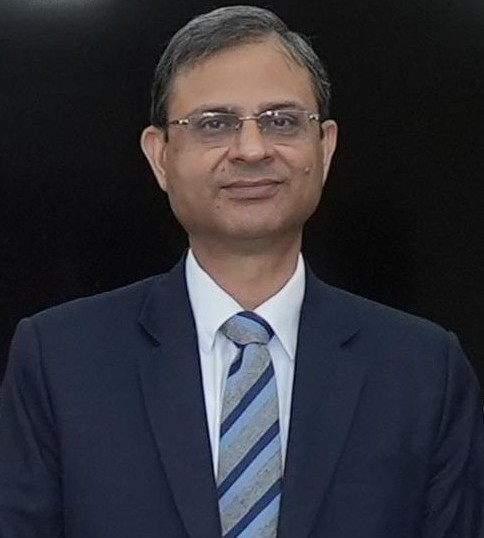

26th Governor of the Reserve Bank of India
- Incumbent
- Assumed office 11 December 2024
- Prime Minister: Narendra Modi
- Preceded by: Shaktikanta Das

Revenue Secretary of India
- In office 1 December 2022 – 11 December 2024
- Preceded by: Tarun Bajaj
- Succeeded by: Arvind Shrivastava

Financial Services Secretary of India
- In office 1 February 2022 – 30 November 2022
- Preceded by: Debasish Panda
- Succeeded by: Vivek Joshi

Personal details
- Born: 14 February 1968 (age 58) Bikaner, Rajasthan, India
- Education: Indian Institute of Technology, Kanpur (BTech); Princeton University (MPP)

Sanjay Malhotra, IAS (born 14 February 1968) is an Indian bureaucrat and IAS officer who is serving as the current and 26th Governor of the Reserve Bank of India since 11 December 2024. He is an IAS Officer of the 1990 Batch Rajasthan Cadre, and has served in various positions throughout his career.

== Early life and education ==
Malhotra was born in Bikaner, Rajasthan and completed his schooling from Kendriya Vidyalaya of Bikaner . He graduated with a Bachelor of Technology in computer science from the Indian Institute of Technology, Kanpur. He then completed his Master's degree in Public policy from the Princeton University, United States. His father was an officer in the Border Security Force (BSF).

== Career ==
Malhotra's career in the Indian government's bureaucracy began in 2000, when was appointed as Private Secretary to a Union Minister. Before his appointment as Private Secretary, he served in various departments in Rajasthan. From 2003 to 2020, Malhotra worked in the Rajasthan government's departments of mines and minerals, information and broadcasting, finance, energy, and commercial taxation. Between 2003 and 2020, in an international posting, Malhotra was a project coordinator in the United Nations Industrial Development Organisation (UNIDO), where he held the rank of Deputy Secretary. From 2000 to 2003, Malhotra was Personal Secretary to the Minister of State for Space and the Minister of State for Micro, Small and Medium Enterprises. In 2020, he was appointed as the Additional Secretary in the Ministry of Power and he also served as the chairman and managing director of the Rural Electrification Corporation.

In February 2022, he was appointed Secretary of Financial Services in the Ministry of Finance and during his time in the position, he launched the initial public offering of the Life Insurance Corporation and was also a member of the board of the Reserve Bank of India (RBI). Malhotra was appointed Revenue Secretary in December 2022, and he implemented a new income tax regime during his time in the position. On 11 December 2024, Malhotra was appointed Governor of the RBI.
