= Bharatiya Reserve Bank Note Mudran =

Division of Reserve Bank of India

- Company type: Subsidiary of Reserve Bank of India
- Industry: Mint
- Founded: 3 February 1995 (30 years ago), Bangalore
- Headquarters: Bangalore
- Number of locations: 4: Dewas, Madhya Pradesh; Mysuru (Mysore), Karnataka; Nashik, Maharashtra; Salboni, West Bengal
- Owner: Reserve Bank of India, Ministry of Finance, Government of India
- Parent: Reserve Bank of India
- Website: www.brbnmpl.co.in

Bharatiya Reserve Bank Note Mudran (BRBNM) is a subsidiary of Reserve Bank of India which is under the ownership of Ministry of Finance of the Government of India. It produces Indian bank notes. It was established in 1995 to address the demand of bank notes. It operates in Indian and global markets, catering to security document needs of Central banks and monetary authorities of the world by designing, printing and supplying banknotes. BRBNM supplies a major portion of bank note requirement in the country with the remaining requirements met through Security Printing & Minting Corporation of India Limited (SPMCIL), a statutory body wholly owned by Government of India. BRBNMPL has two presses in Mysuru and Salboni. The present capacity for both the presses is 16 billion note pieces per year on a two-shift basis.

It made a world record by printing more than 20,000 million pieces of bank notes in financial year 2016–17, It has its own design cell. It has the capability to print all the denominations of Indian bank notes. The other two bank note presses of SPMCIL are Currency Note Press Nashik Road, and Bank Note Presses Dewas.

== History ==
Until 1928, Indian currency was printed by De La Rue, a British banknote manufacturing company. The Indian Security Press at Nashik was commissioned by the British Indian Government in the same year and assigned the responsibility of printing Indian currency.

== Structure ==
BRBNMPL is governed by a board of directors, headed by a non-executive director appointed by the RBI.
