= Sovereign Gold Bond =

Indian government security linked to Gold

Sovereign Gold Bond, abbreviated as SGB, is a government security issued by the Reserve Bank of India (RBI) on behalf of the Government of India. It is denominated in grams of gold and is linked to the price of gold in India. It is also an interest-bearing bond, carrying an interest of 2.5% p.a. paid in two installments every year till maturity.

The bond has an 8-year term with an option for early withdrawal through the RBI after 5 years. It is listed and traded on Indian stock exchanges, allowing eligible investors to buy or sell anytime through their demat accounts. It can also be transferred to other eligible investors without redemption through the RBI.

The scheme was discontinued in 2024 due to being an expensive method of borrowing for the government. Existing bonds were not affected.

== History ==
The scheme was initially announced in the 2015 Union budget. It was approved by the cabinet on 9 September 2015, and was launched by Prime Minister Narendra Modi in an event in New Delhi on 5 November 2015. The event was also attended by the Union Minister for Finance Arun Jaitley, the Minister of State for Finance Jayant Sinha and the Minister of State for Commerce & Industry Nirmala Sitharaman. The Gold Monetisation Scheme, Indian Gold Coins and Sovereign Gold Bonds were all launched in the same event.

The scheme was introduced due to a forex crisis caused by high gold imports. Most of the demand for gold in India is met through imports and it was believed that such a scheme would ultimately help in reducing the country’s current account deficit.

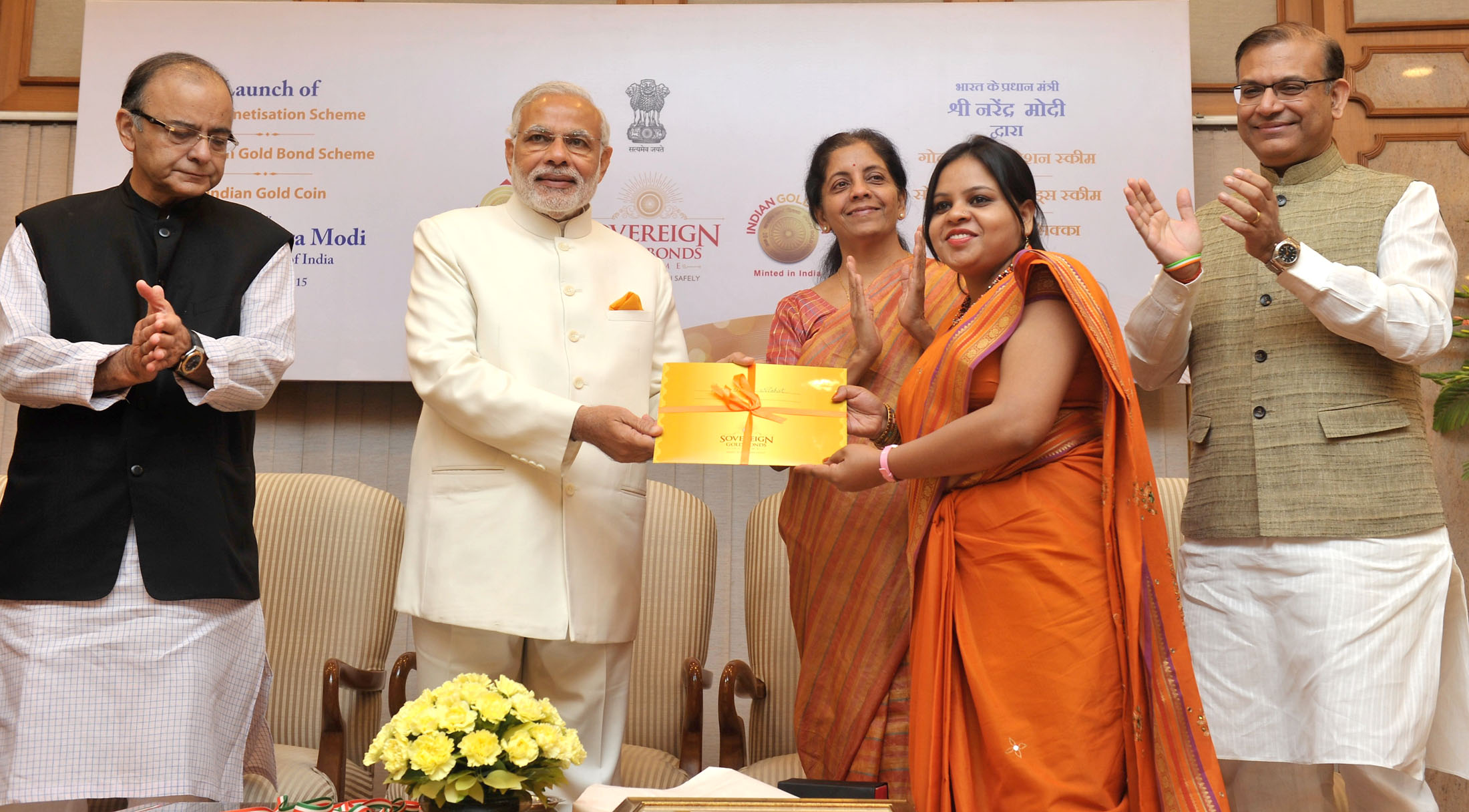
Narendra Modi launching the Gold schemes and handing over a card to a woman in November 2015

It was first notified by the Department of Economic Affairs on 14 January 2016 under the Government Securities Act, 2006. The initial subscription allowed investors to buy a minimum of 2 grams, and a maximum of 500 grams. It was open from 18 to 22 January 2016 and attracted ₹245.2 Cr of investments. The bonds initially paid 2.75% interest per year. This was later reduced to 2.5% per year for newer bonds. The bonds were sold through banks, post offices and through online securities brokers which would allow investors to hold the bonds in demat form.

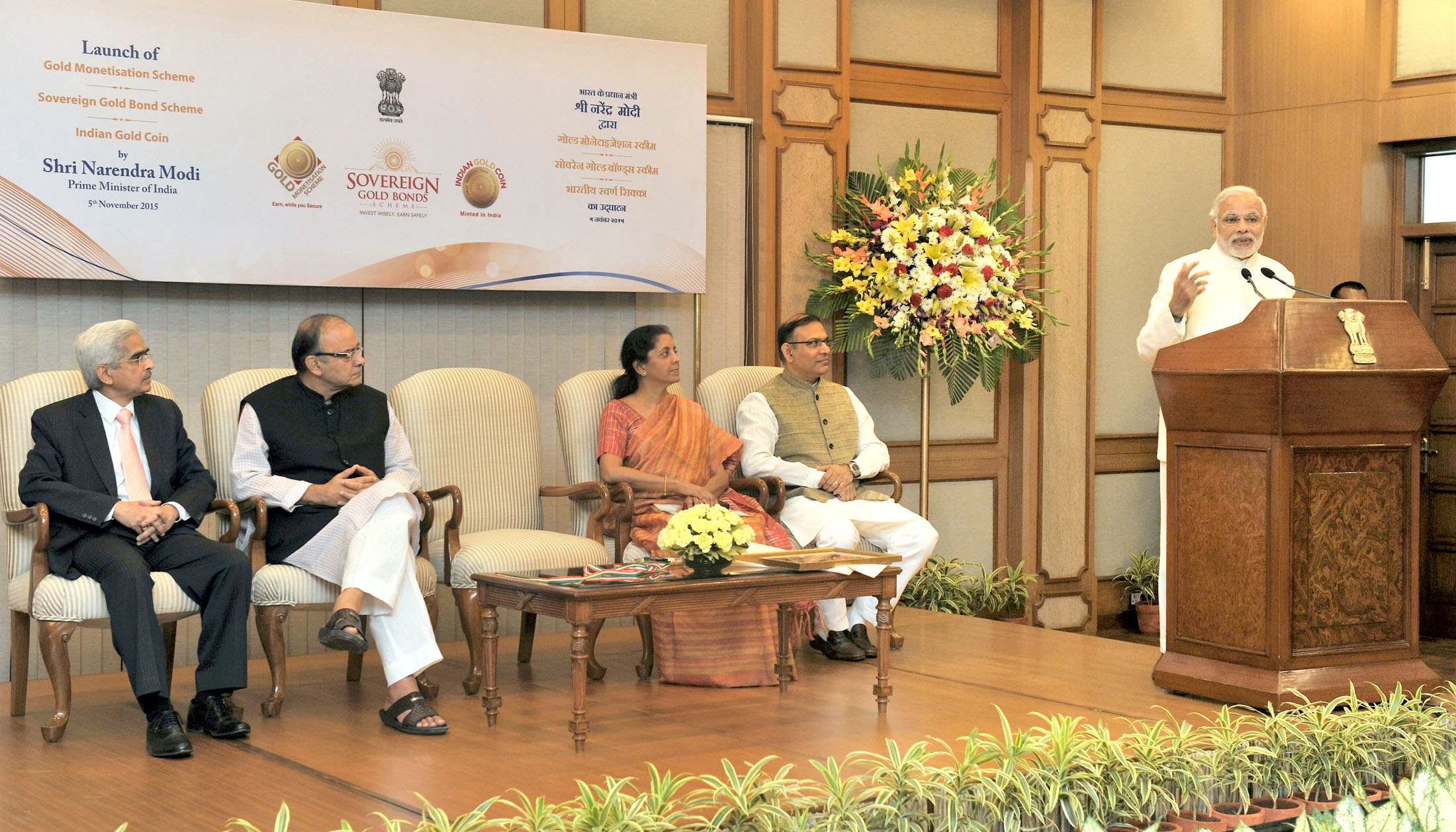
Narendra Modi addressing at the launch of the Gold schemes

In August 2024, the investors who would have redeemed the bonds issued in August 2016 lost suffered a loss due a fall in the price of gold. This fall was linked to the slash in import duty on gold from 15% to 6% during the 2024 Union budget of India.

After the final redemption of the 2016-I series, it was rumoured that the scheme was turning out to be very expensive for the Indian government, due to an unexpected rise in the prices of gold. The government also felt SGBs have also not served the purpose for which it was launched, which was to bring down gold imports by trying to move demand from physical gold to an electronic form. In addition, the RBI has not issued any new series after February 2024. Physical gold purchases were made more attractive, by lowering their import duty from 15% to 6%. After the 2025 Union budget, Minister of Finance Nirmala Sitharaman confirmed that the government had no plans of launching more tranches of SGBs. Economic Affairs Secretary Ajay Seth said that it had turned out to be a high cost method of borrowing for the government compared to traditional bonds and that they had not seen the expected reductions in import of gold. It made no fiscal sense to continue with a scheme that was not beneficial for both the government and the economy.

The price for 10 grams of gold increased from Rs 26,300 in 2015 to about Rs 84,450 in March 2025, thus increasing the liability of the government to Rs 1.12 lakh crore, with investors holding about 132 tonnes of gold in SGBs.

In the 2026 Union budget, Nirmala Sitharaman announced that the capital gains exemption would be available only if SGBs were purchased at the time of issue and held till maturity. It would not be available if someone bought these bonds from the secondary market. On the day of this announcement, several series recorded a 10% drop in value, which also coincided with a crash in global price of the metal.

== Eligibility ==
People residing in India, as defined in the Foreign Exchange Management Act, 1999 are eligible to invest in SGBs. These include individuals, Hindu Undivided Families (HUFs), universities, trusts, and charitable institutions. People who become non-residents after buying an SGB can still hold it until maturity or premature redemption.

The bonds are issued in 1-gram denominations and multiples thereof. Each eligible investor can purchase up to 4 kg per financial year. A demat account is optional; bonds can be held in dematerialized form with a securities depository or tracked by the RBI.

== Price ==
The issue price is the average closing price of 999 purity gold from the last 3 business days before the subscription period, as published by the India Bullion and Jewelers Association Limited (IBJA). The redemption price, for both early and maturity redemptions, is the average closing price from the 3 business days before repayment.

== Comparison with other forms of gold investments ==
SGBs, purely as an investment format, can be compared to other forms of investing in Gold.

Comparison of SGB, physical gold, gold ETFs and mutual funds and digital gold in India
	SGB	Physical gold	Gold ETF and mutual funds	Digital gold
Storage	Stored in government facilities. Very low risk of theft.	Risk of theft	Stored in vaults. Low risk of theft	Stored in vaults. Low risk of theft
Regulated by	Reserve Bank of India	Not regulated	Securities and Exchange Board of India	Not regulated
Charges	No making charges, GST, or expense ratio	Making charges from 8% to 35%. GST of 3%. No expense ratio.	No making charges or GST. Expense ratio up to 1% is allowed.	No making charges. GST of 3% and commissions are applicable. No expense ratio.
Interest	Fixed at 2.5% per annum	No interest payments	No interest payments	No interest payments
Taxation	No tax on capital gains if held from issue until maturity. Interest is taxed at slab.	Tax on capital gains	Tax on capital gains	Tax on capital gains
Liqudity	Can be sold on stock exchanges if held in demat form. Can be sold back to the RBI at specified intervals.	Can be sold physically to jewelers anytime	Units can be sold back to the asset management company	Can be liquidated instantly

== Issue history ==
Data of Sovereign Gold Bonds (Tranche wise) issued till 23 April 2024
#	Tranche	ISIN	Issue Date	Issue price/unit (₹)	Units subscribed (grams)	Redemption price/unit (₹)	CAGR Returns (Absolute) (%) (Note: CAGR calculations do not include interest payments and are post-tax, since capital gains tax arising on redemption of SGB to an individual are exempted.)
1	2015-I	IN0020150085	30 November 2015	2,684	913,571	6,132	10.87 (128.46)
2	2016-I	IN0020150101	8 February 2016	2,600	2,869,973	6,271	11.63 (141.19)
3	2016-II	IN0020150119	29 March 2016	2,916	1,119,741	6,601	10.75 (126.37)
4	2016-17 Series I	IN0020160027	5 August 2016	3,119	2,953,025	6,938	10.50 (122.44)
5	2016-17 Series II	IN0020160043	30 September 2016	3,150	2,615,800	7,517	10.80 (127.21)
6	2016-17 Series III	IN0020160076	17 November 2016	3,007	3,598,055	7,788	12.63 (159)
7	2016-17 Series IV	IN0020160126	17 March 2017	2,943	2,220,885	8,624	14.37 (193.03)
8	2017-18 Series I	IN0020170018	12 May 2017	2,951	2,027,695	9,486	15.72 (221.5)
9	2017-18 Series II	IN0020170034	28 July 2017	2,830	2,349,953	9,924	16.97 (250.67)
10	2017-18 Series III	IN0020170059	16 October 2017	2,956	264,815	12,567	19.82 (325.14)
11	2017-18 Series IV	IN0020170067	23 October 2017	2,987	378,945	12,704	19.82 (325.31)
12	2017-18 Series V	IN0020170075	30 October 2017	2,971	174,024	11,992	19.04 (303.64)
13	2017-18 Series VI	IN0020170083	6 November 2017	2,945	153,356	12,066	19.26 (309.71)
14	2017-18 Series VII	IN0020170091	13 November 2017	2,934	175,121	12,350	19.67 (320.93)
15	2017-18 Series VIII	IN0020170109	20 November 2017	2,961	135,666	12,300	19.47 (315.4)
16	2017-18 Series IX	IN0020170117	27 November 2017	2,964	105,512	12,484	19.68 (321.19)
17	2017-18 Series X	IN0020170125	4 December 2017	2,961	107,380	12,820	20.09 (332.96)
18	2017-18 Series XI	IN0020170133	11 December 2017	2,952	81,614	12,801	20.11 (333.64)
19	2017-18 Series XII	IN0020170141	18 December 2017	2,890	111,218	13,245	20.94 (358.3)
20	2017-18 Series XIII	IN0020170158	26 December 2017	2,866	131,958	13,563	21.43 (373.24)
21	2017-18 Series XIV	IN0020170166	1 January 2018	2,881	327,434	13,486	21.26 (359.93)
22	2018-19 Series I	IN0020180033	4 May 2018	3,114	650,337	14,901	21.6 (378.52)
23	2018-19 Series II	IN0020180249	23 October 2018	3,146	312,258	14,425	20.95 (358.52)
24	2018-19 Series III	IN0020180314	13 November 2018	3,183	409,398	14,024	20.35 (340.59)
25	2018-19 Series IV	IN0020180389	1 January 2019	3,119	207,886		
26	2018-19 Series V	IN0020180462	22 January 2019	3,214	243,606		
27	2018-19 Series VI	IN0020180561	12 February 2019	3,326	207,388		
28	2019-20 Series I	IN0020190073	11 June 2019	3,196	459,789		
29	2019-20 Series II	IN0020190081	16 July 2019	3,443	535,947		
30	2019-20 Series III	IN0020190107	14 August 2019	3,499	1,024,837		
31	2019-20 Series IV	IN0020190115	17 September 2019	3,890	627,892		
32	2019-20 Series V	IN0020190370	15 October 2019	3,788	455,776		
33	2019-20 Series VI	IN0020190388	30 October 2019	3,835	693,210		
34	2019-20 Series VII	IN0020190461	10 December 2019	3,795	648,304		
35	2019-20 Series VIII	IN0020190537	21 January 2020	4,016	522,119		
36	2019-20 Series IX	IN0020190545	11 February 2020	4,070	405,957		
37	2019-20 Series X	IN0020190552	11 March 2020	4,260	757,338		
38	2020-21, Series I	IN0020200062	28 April 2020	4,639	1,772,874		
39	2020-21, Series II	IN0020200088	19 May 2020	4,590	2,544,294		
40	2020-21, Series III	IN0020200104	16 June 2020	4,677	2,388,328		
41	2020-21, Series IV	IN0020200146	14 July 2020	4,852	4,130,820		
42	2020-21, Series V	IN0020200161	11 August 2020	5,334	6,349,781		
43	2020-21, Series VI	IN0020200195	8 September 2020	5,117	3,190,133		
44	2020-21, Series VII	IN0020200203	20 October 2020	5,051	1,859,518		
45	2020-21, Series VIII	IN0020200286	18 November 2020	5,177	1,573,457		
46	2020-21, Series IX	IN0020200377	5 January 2021	5,000	2,869,886		
47	2020-21, Series X	IN0020200385	19 January 2021	5,104	1,214,048		
48	2020-21, Series XI	IN0020200393	9 February 2021	4,912	1,227,915		
49	2020-21, Series XII	IN0020200427	9 March 2021	4,662	3,230,907		
50	2021-22, Series I	IN0020210053	25 May 2021	4,777	5,318,973		
51	2021-22, Series II	IN0020210061	1 June 2021	4,842	1,898,475		
52	2021-22, Series III	IN0020210087	8 June 2021	4,889	1,479,232		
53	2021-22, Series IV	IN0020210111	20 July 2021	4,807	2,923,762		
54	2021-22, Series V	IN0020210129	17 August 2021	4,790	2,292,743		
55	2021-22, Series VI	IN0020210145	7 September 2021	4,732	3,520,341		
56	2021-22, Series VII	IN0020210178	2 November 2021	4,761	3,248,238		
57	2021-22, Series VIII	IN0020210228	7 December 2021	4,791	2,480,493		
58	2021-22, Series IX	IN0020210236	18 January 2022	4,786	2,333,188		
59	2021-22, Series X	IN0020210319	8 March 2022	5,109	1,539,694		
60	2022-23, Series I	IN0020220045	28 June 2022	5,091	2,557,864		
61	2022-23, Series II	IN0020220078	30 August 2022	5,197	3,360,408		
62	2022-23, Series III	IN0020220110	27 December 2022	5,409	2,811,010		
63	2022-23, Series IV	IN0020220169	14 March 2023	5,611	3,531,586		
64	2023-24, Series I	IN0020230069	27 June 2023	5,926	7,769,290		
65	2023-24, Series II	IN0020230093	20 September 2023	5,923	11,673,960		
66	2023-24, Series III	IN0020230168	28 December 2023	6,199	12,106,807		
67	2023-24, Series IV	IN0020230184	21 February 2024	6,263	12,785,729		
Total					146961537 (~147 tons)		
