= Indian 1000-rupee note =

Obsolete denomination of the Indian Currency

One thousand rupees
- Country: India
- Value: ₹1000
- Width: 177 mm
- Height: 73 mm
- Security features: Security thread, latent image, micro-lettering, intaglio print, fluorescent ink, optically variable ink, watermark, and see through registration device.
- Material used: special variety of cotton, linen, abaca and fibre
- Years of printing: November 2000 – November 2016

Obverse
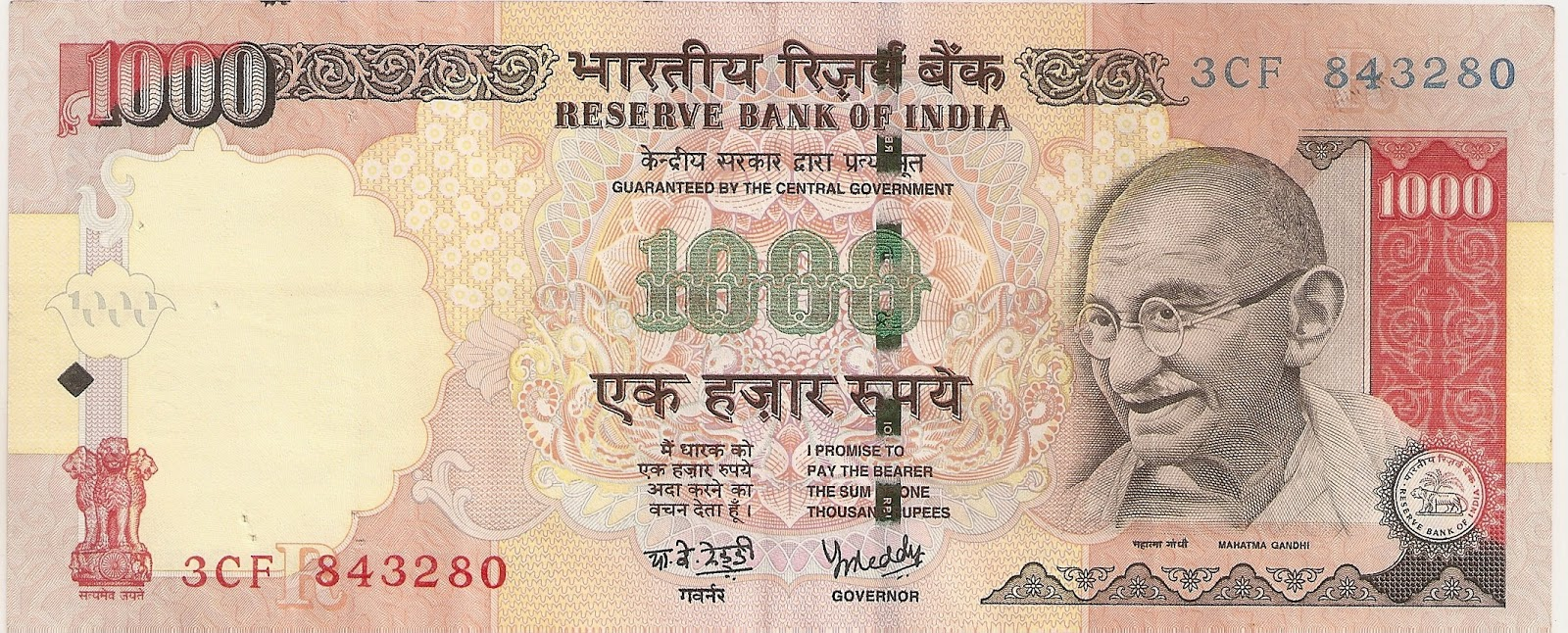
- Design: Mahatma Gandhi
- Design date: 2000

Reverse
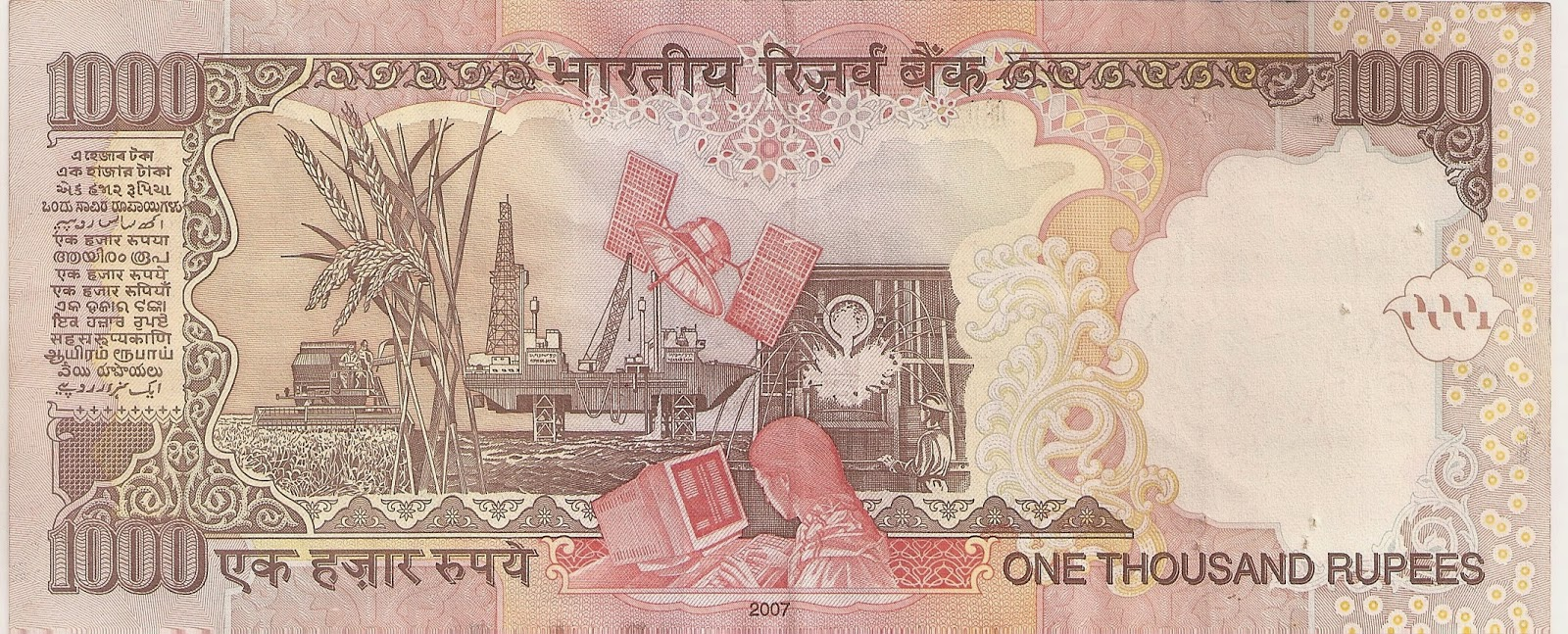
- Design: Economy of India
- Design date: 2000

The Indian 1,000-rupee banknote (₹1000) was a denomination of the Indian rupee. It was introduced and demonetized several times, before being finally demonetized in 2016. It was the highest denomination banknote in India prior to 2016, and remains the second highest denomination note ever printed by the Reserve Bank of India, after the 2000 rupee banknote, since the 1978 demonetization of Rs. 5000 and Rs. 10,000 notes.

== History ==
It was first introduced by the Reserve Bank of India in 1938 under British rule and subsequently demonetized in 1946. Post-independence, the denomination was reintroduced in 1954, but in January 1978, all high-denomination banknotes of ₹1000 were demonetized once again, along with ₹5000 and ₹10000 banknotes in order to curb unaccounted cash money.

In order to contain the volume of banknotes in circulation due to inflation, the ₹1000 banknote was again reintroduced in November 2000, under the government of Atal Bihari Vajpayee, as a part of the Mahatma Gandhi Series of banknotes; these were demonetized on 8 November 2016 by the Prime Minister of India Narendra Modi, with the claimed reasons of preventing the issue of counterfeit currency and to fight corruption and black money in India.

== Mahatma Gandhi Series ==
=== Design ===
The ₹1000 banknote of the Mahatma Gandhi Series is 177 × 73 mm pink-red coloured, with the obverse side featuring a portrait of Mahatma Gandhi with the signature of the governor of Reserve Bank of India. It had a Braille feature to assist the visually challenged in identifying the currency. The reverse side featured the motif of an oil rig, a satellite and a steel foundry, all together featuring the Economy of India.

As of 2011, the new ₹ sign had been incorporated into banknotes of ₹1000. In January 2014, RBI announced that it would be withdrawing from circulation all banknotes printed prior to 2005 by 31 March 2014. The deadline was later extended to 1 January 2015, and then again to 30 June 2016. Denomination of ₹1,000 notes cost was ₹3.54.

=== Security features ===
The security features of the ₹1000 banknote included:

- A windowed security thread that read 'भारत' (Bharat in the Devanagari script) and 'RBI' alternately.
- Latent image of the value of the banknote on the vertical band next to the right hand side of Mahatma Gandhi’s portrait.
- Watermark of Mahatma Gandhi that is a mirror-image of the main portrait.
- The number panel of the banknote was printed in embedded fluorescent fibres and optically variable ink.
- Since 2005, additional security features (including machine-readable security thread, electrotype watermark, and year of print) appear on the bank note.

=== Discontinuation ===
On 8 November 2016, Prime Minister Narendra Modi announced that "Starting from midnight 8th November 2016 all ₹1000 banknotes of the Mahatma Gandhi Series will not be accepted as a form of legal tender", although new ₹500 and ₹2000 banknotes of the new Mahatma Gandhi New Series were unveiled.

== Languages ==
Like the other Indian rupee banknotes, the ₹1000 banknote had its value written in 17 languages. On the obverse, the denomination was written in English and Hindi. On the reverse is a language panel which displayed the denomination of the note in 15 of the 22 official languages of India, displayed in alphabetical order. Languages included on the panel were Assamese, Bengali, Gujarati, Kannada, Kashmiri, Konkani, Malayalam, Marathi, Nepali, Odia, Punjabi, Sanskrit, Tamil, Telugu and Urdu.

Denominations in central level official languages (At below either ends)
Language	₹1000
English	One thousand rupees
Hindi	एक हज़ार रुपये
Denominations in 15 state level/other official languages (As seen on the language panel)
Assamese	এহেজাৰ টকা
Bengali	এক হাজার টাকা
Gujarati	એક હજાર રૂપિયા
Kannada	ಒಂದು ಸಾವಿರ ರುಪಾಯಿಗಳು
Kashmiri	ساس رۄپیہِ
Konkani	एक हजार रुपया
Malayalam	ആയിരം രൂപ
Marathi	एक हजार रुपये
Nepali	एक हजार रुपियाँ
Odia	ଏକ ହଜାର ଟଙ୍କା
Punjabi	ਇਕ ਹਜ਼ਾਰ ਰੁਪਏ
Sanskrit	सहस्रं रूप्यकाणि
Tamil	ஆயிரம் ரூபாய்
Telugu	వెయ్యి రూపాయలు
Urdu	ایک ہزار روپیے

== Mahatma Gandhi New Series ==
On 10 November 2016, the then Economic Affairs Secretary Shaktikanta Das announced a new ₹1000 banknote would be released in the Mahatma Gandhi New Series in the coming months. But on 22 February 2017, Das walked back on his earlier announcement to deny it, saying there was no plan to reintroduce the banknote.
