= Reserve Bank of India =

Central bank of India

Reserve Bank of India भारतीय रिज़र्व बैंक
- State Emblem of India Seal of the Reserve Bank of India Logo of the Reserve Bank of India The RBI Central Office Building, also popularly known as the COB Tower in Mumbai, serves as the RBI's headquarters.
- Central bank of: India
- Headquarters: Mumbai, Maharashtra, India
- Established: 1 April 1935; 91 years ago
- Governing body: Central Board of Directors.
- Governor: Sanjay Malhotra, IAS
- Key people: Swaminathan Janakiraman (Deputy Governor); Poonam Gupta (Deputy Governor); Shirish Chandra Murmu (Deputy Governor); Rohit Jain (Deputy Governor)
- Currency: Indian rupee (₹); INR (ISO 4217)
- Reserves: ▲$785.7 billion (Note: Indian reports are released on a weekly basis rather than the traditional monthly basis with the figures being of the previous week, by Reserve Bank of India.) (as of 11 September 2026)
- Bank rate: ▲5.50% (Policy Repo Rate) (as of 7 October 2026)
- Interest on reserves: 5.25% (Standing Deposit Facility Rate) (as of 7 October 2026)
- Website: www.rbi.org.in
- Reserve Bank of India

Agency overview
- Jurisdiction: Government of India
- Child agency: Monetary Policy Committee
- Key document: Reserve Bank of India Act, 1934

The Reserve Bank of India (RBI) is the central bank of the Republic of India. It was established on 1 April 1935 by the British Raj, with enactment of the Reserve Bank of India Act, 1934. Although, the RBI is owned by the Government of India, the RBI is an autonomous regulatory organisation for the Indian banking and financial system, exercising substantial amount of independence and power over the Indian economy. It is responsible for the issue, supply and control of the Indian rupee. It also manages the country's main payment systems and the foreign exchange under the FEMA Act, 1999.

The RBI, along with the Indian Banks' Association, established the National Payments Corporation of India (NPCI) to promote and regulate the payment and settlement systems in India. Bharatiya Reserve Bank Note Mudran (BRBNM) is a specialised division of RBI through which it prints and mints Indian currency notes (INR) in two of its currency printing presses located in Mysore (Karnataka; Southern India) and Salboni (West Bengal; Eastern India). Deposit Insurance and Credit Guarantee Corporation was established by RBI as a specialized division for the purpose of providing insurance of deposits and guaranteeing of credit facilities to all Indian banks.

The RBI is responsible for formulating and implementing India's monetary policy. The 2016 reform changed the decision-making framework from a Governor-centric model to a committee-based Monetary Policy Committee (MPC) model. RBI commenced its operations on 2 April 1935 in accordance with the Reserve Bank of India Act, 1934. The original share capital was divided into shares of 100 each fully paid. The RBI was nationalised on 1 January 1949, almost a year and a half after India's independence.

The overall direction of the RBI lies with the 21-member central board of directors, composed of: the Governor; four Deputy Governors; two finance ministry representatives (usually the Economic Affairs Secretary and the Financial Services Secretary); ten government-nominated directors; and four directors who represent local boards for Mumbai, Kolkata, Chennai, and New Delhi. Each of these local boards consists of five members who represent regional interests and the interests of co-operative and indigenous banks.

It is a member bank of the Asian Clearing Union. The bank is also active in promoting financial inclusion policy and is a leading member of the Alliance for Financial Inclusion (AFI). The bank is often referred to by the name "Mint Street".

== Preamble ==
The preamble of the Reserve Bank of India describes the basic functions of the reserve bank as:

...to regulate the issue of Bank notes and keeping of reserves with a view to securing monetary stability in India and generally to operate the currency and credit system of the country to its advantage; to have a modern monetary policy framework to meet the challenge of an increasingly complex economy, to maintain price stability while keeping in mind the objective of growth.

—

== History ==
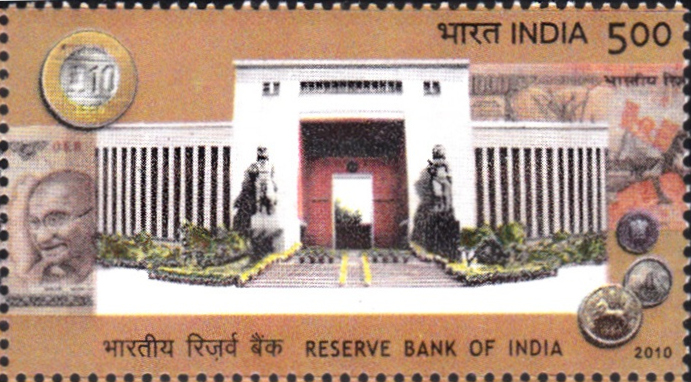
A 2010 stamp dedicated to the 75th anniversary of the Reserve Bank of India

The Reserve Bank of India was established in 1934, under the Reserve Bank of India Act. Though privately owned initially, it was nationalised in 1949 and since then fully owned by the Ministry of Finance, Government of India (GoI).

=== 1935–1949 ===
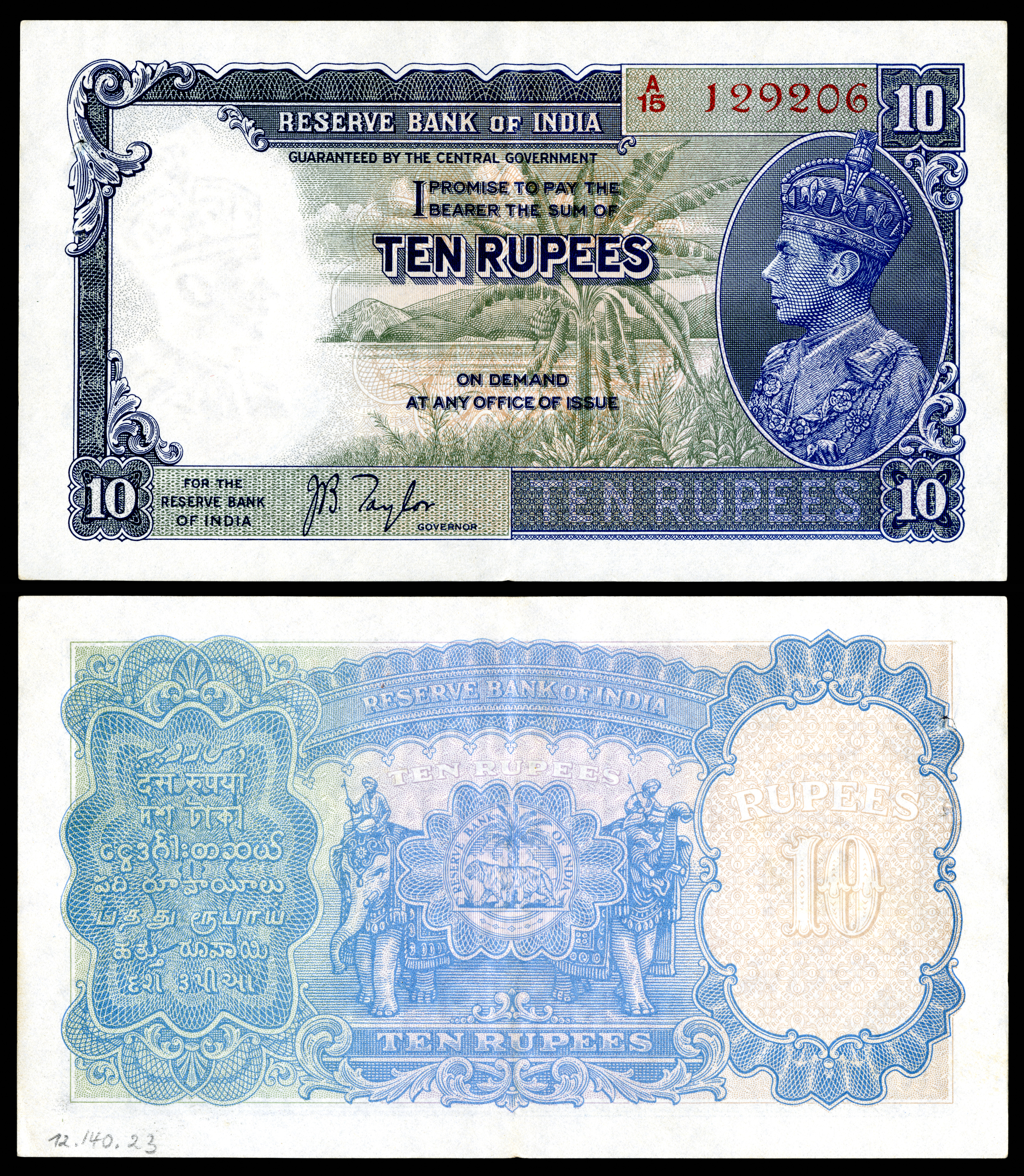
Reserve Bank of India-10 Rupees (1938), the first year of banknote issue

The Reserve Bank of India was founded on 1 April 1935 to respond to economic troubles after the First World War. The bank was set up based on the recommendations of the 1926 Royal Commission on Indian Currency and Finance, also known as the Hilton Young Commission. Eventually, the Central Legislative Assembly passed these guidelines as the RBI Act 1934. India was the first colony to have its own central bank.

The original choice for the seal of RBI was the East India Company Double Mohur, with the sketch of the Lion and swimming Tree. However, it was decided to replace the lion with the tiger, the national animal of India. The Preamble of the RBI describes its basic functions to regulate the issue of banknotes, keep reserves to secure monetary stability in India, and generally to operate the currency and credit system in the best interests of the country. The Central Office of the RBI was established in Calcutta (now Kolkata) but was moved to Bombay (now Mumbai) in 1937. The RBI also acted as Burma's (now Myanmar) central bank until April 1947 (except during the years of Japanese occupation (1942–45)), even though Burma seceded from British India in 1937. After the Partition of India in August 1947, the bank served as the central bank for Pakistan until June 1948 when the State Bank of Pakistan commenced operations. Though set up as a shareholders' bank, the RBI has been fully owned by the Government of India since its nationalisation in 1949. RBI has a monopoly of note issue.

=== 1950–1960 ===
In the 1950s, the Indian government, under its first Prime Minister Jawaharlal Nehru, developed a centrally planned economic policy that focused on the agricultural sector. The administration nationalised commercial banks and established, based on the Banking Companies Act, 1949 (later called the Banking Regulation Act), a central bank regulation as part of the RBI. Furthermore, the central bank was ordered to support economic plan with loans.

=== 1961–1968 ===
As a result of bank crashes, the RBI was requested to establish and monitor a deposit insurance system. Meant to restore the trust in the national bank system, it was initialized on 7 December 1961. The Indian government founded the funds to promote the economy and used the slogan "Developing Banking". The government of India restructured the national bank market and nationalized a lot of institutes. As a result, the RBI had to play the central part in controlling and supporting this public banking sector.

=== 1969–1984 ===
In 1969, the Indira Gandhi-headed government nationalised 14 major commercial banks. Upon Indira Gandhi's return to power in 1980, a further six banks were nationalised. The regulation of the economy and especially the financial sector was reinforced by the Government of India in the 1970s and 1980s. The central bank became the central player and increased its policies a lot for various tasks like interests, reserve ratio and visible deposits. These measures aimed at better economic development and had a huge effect on the company policy of the institutes. The banks lend money in selected sectors, like agricultural business and small trade companies. The Banking Commission was established on Wednesday, 29 January 1969, to analyse banking costs, effects of legislations and banking procedures, including non-banking financial intermediaries and indigenous banking on Government of India economy; with R.G. Saraiya as the chairman.

The branch was forced to establish two new offices in the country for every newly established office in a town. The oil crises in 1973 resulted in increasing inflation, and the RBI restricted monetary policy to reduce the effects.

=== 1985–1990 ===
Many committees analysed the Indian economy between 1985 and 1989. Their results had an effect on the RBI. The Board for Industrial and Financial Reconstruction, the Indira Gandhi Institute of Development Research and the Security & Exchange Board of India investigated the national economy as a whole, and the security and exchange board proposed better methods for more effective markets and the protection of investor interests. The Indian financial market was a leading example for so-called "financial repression" (Mckinnon and Shaw). The Discount and Finance House of India began its operations in the monetary market in April 1988; the National Housing Bank, founded in July 1988, was forced to invest in the property market and a new financial law improved the versatility of direct deposit by more security measures and liberalisation.

=== 1991–1999 ===
The national economy contracted in July 1991 as the Indian rupee was devalued. The currency lost 18% of its value relative to the US dollar, and the Narsimham Committee advised restructuring the financial sector by a temporal reduced reserve ratio as well as the statutory liquidity ratio. New guidelines were published in 1993 to establish a private banking sector. This turning point was meant to reinforce the market and was often called neo-liberal. The central bank deregulated bank interests and some sectors of the financial market like the trust and property markets. This first phase was a success and the central government forced a diversity liberalisation to diversify owner structures in 1998.

The National Stock Exchange of India took the trade on in June 1994 and the RBI allowed nationalised banks in July to interact with the capital market to reinforce their capital base. The central bank founded a subsidiary company—the Bharatiya Reserve Bank Note Mudran Private Limited—on 3 February 1995 to produce banknotes.

=== 2000 - 2009 ===
The Foreign Exchange Management Act, 1999 came into force in June 2000. It should improve the item in 2004–2005 (National Electronic Fund Transfer). The Security Printing & Minting Corporation of India Ltd., a merger of nine institutions, was founded in 2006 and produces banknotes and coins.

The national economy's growth rate came down to 5.8% in the last quarter of 2008–2009 and the central bank promotes the economic development.

=== Since 2010 ===
In 2016, the Government of India amended the RBI Act to establish the Monetary Policy Committee (MPC) to set. This limited the role of the RBI in setting interest rates, as the MPC membership is evenly divided between members of the RBI (including the RBI governor) and independent members appointed by the government. However, in the event of a tie, the vote of the RBI governor is decisive.

The same year, the RBI started issuing a new bond called the Sovereign Gold Bond, on behalf of the Government. The intent behind the scheme was to reduce gold imports by shifting investments from physical gold into a bond that tracked the price of gold. The bond also carried interest.

In April 2018, the RBI announced that "entities regulated by RBI shall not deal with or provide services to any individual or business entities dealing with or settling virtual currencies," including Bitcoin. While the RBI later clarified that it "has not prohibited" virtual currencies, a three-judge panel of the Supreme Court of India issued a ruling on 4 March 2020 that the RBI had failed to show "at least some semblance of any damage suffered by its regulated entities" through the handling of virtual currencies to justify its decision. The court challenge was filed by the Internet and Mobile Association of India, whose members include some cryptocurrency exchanges whose businesses suffered following the RBI's 2018 order.

== Organisation Structure ==
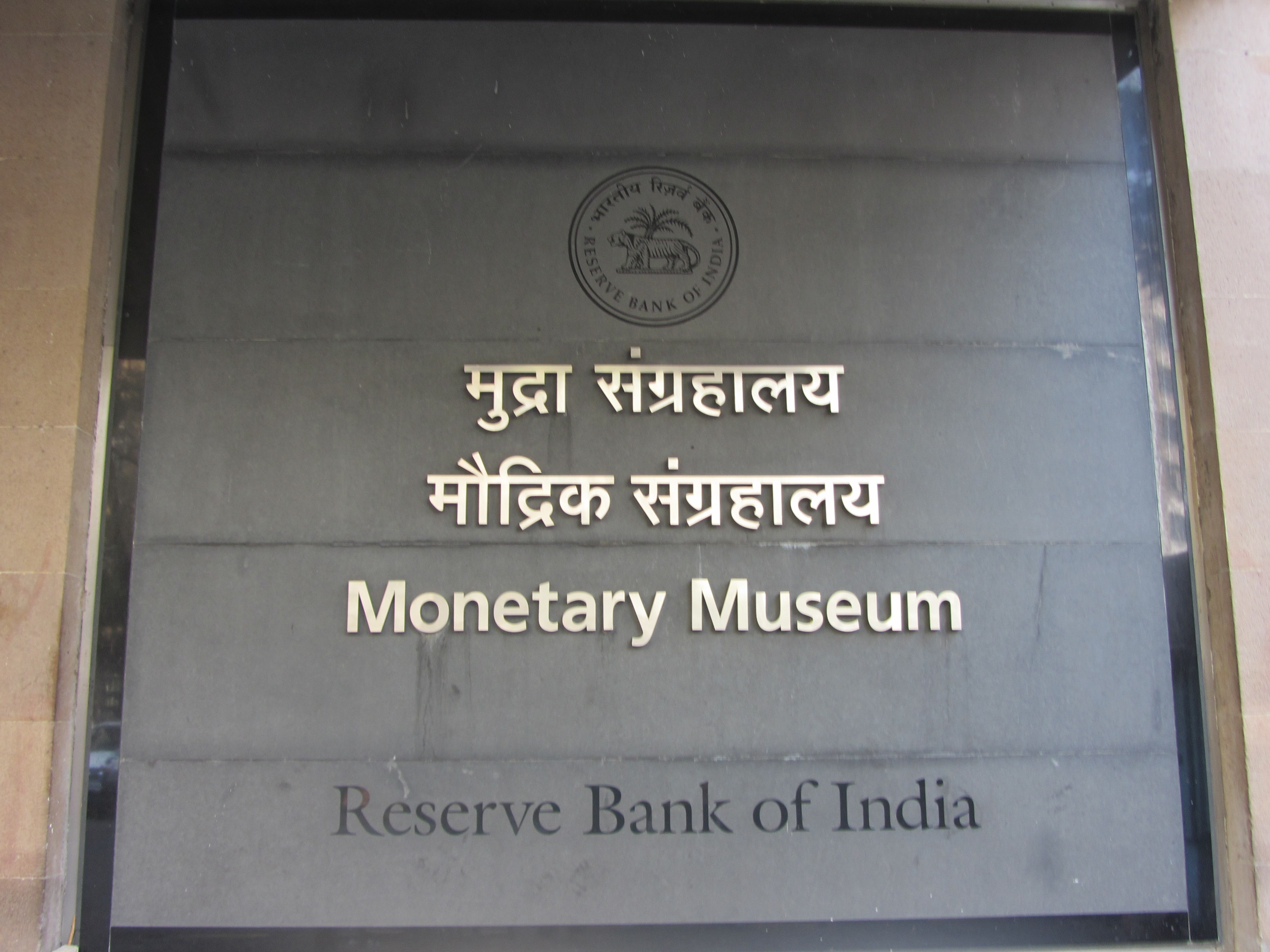
RBI Monetary Museum in Mumbai was established by the bank under its educational programme in 2004.

The central board of directors is the main committee of the central bank. The Government of India appoints the directors for a four-year term. The board consists of a governor, and not more than four deputy governors; four directors to represent the regional boards; two – usually the Economic Affairs Secretary and the Financial Services Secretary – from the Ministry of Finance and ten other directors from various fields. The Reserve Bank – under Raghuram Rajan's governorship – wanted to create a post of a chief operating officer (COO), in the rank of deputy governor and wanted to re-allocate work between the five of them (four deputy governor and COO).

Two of the four deputy governors are traditionally from RBI ranks and are selected from the bank's executive directors. One is nominated from among the chairpersons of public sector banks and the other is an economist. An Indian Administrative Service (IAS) officer can also be appointed as deputy governor of RBI and later as the governor of RBI as with the case of Y. Venugopal Reddy and Duvvuri Subbarao. Other persons forming part of the central board of directors of the RBI are Satish Kashinath Marathe, Swaminathan Gurumurthy, Anand Gopal Mahindra, Venu Srinivasan, Pankaj Ramanbhai Patel, Ravindra H. Dholakia.

Executive Directors (ED) consist of Vivek Deep, Radha Shyam Rathao, Ajay Kumar, Neeraj Nigam, P. Vasudevan, R. Laxmi Kanth Rao, Arnab Kumar Chowdhury, Charulatha S. Kar, Ajit Ratankar Joshi, Sajay Kumar Hansda, Indranil Bhattacharya, Kesavan Ramachandran, Sonali Sen Gupta, Usha Jankiraman and Sudha Balakrishnan (Chief Financial Officer).

Sudha Balakrishnan, a former vice-president at National Securities Depository Limited, assumed charge as the first chief financial officer (CFO) of the Reserve Bank on 15 May 2018; she was given the rank of an executive director.

The bank's current governor is Sanjay Malhotra. There are currently four deputy governors Swaminathan Janakiraman, Poonam Gupta, Shirish Chandra Murmu and Rohit Jain.

Central Board of Directors appointed/nominated under RBI Act, 1934
Section of RBI Act	Sr. No.	Name			
8 (1) (a)	1	Sanjay Malhotra, IAS; Governor			
8 (1) (a)	2–5	Swaminathan J Deputy Governor	Poonam Gupta; Deputy Governor	Shirish Chandra Murmu; Deputy Governor	Rohit Jain; Deputy Governor
8 (1) (b)	6–7	Revathy Iyer, IA&AS (Retired), Former Deputy Comptroller & Auditor General		Sachin Chaturvedi; Professor	
8 (1) (c)	8–12	Anand Gopal Mahindra, Chairman of Mahindra Group		Somanath Sreedhara Panicker, Former Chairperson of ISRO	
8 (1) (c)	8–12	Janmejaya Kumar Sinha, Chairman of BCG India		Syed Akbaruddin, IFS (Retired), Former Permanent Representative of India to the United Nations	
8 (1) (c)	8–12	Annie George Mathew, IA&AS (Retired), Former Special Secretary-Department of Expenditure, MoF			
8 (1) (d)	13–14	Anuradha Thakur, IAS; Economic Affairs Secretary		Sanjay Lohiya, IAS; Financial Services Secretary	

RBI Organizational Structure (G → DG → ED → Departments → CGM)
Governor	Deputy Governor	Executive Director	Departments	Head (in the rank of CGM)
Sanjay Malhotra
Sanjay Malhotra	Swaminathan J	Neeraj Nigam	Human Resource Management incl. Central Security Cell	Navin Nambiar
Sanjay Malhotra	Swaminathan J	Neeraj Nigam	Deposit Insurance & Credit Guarantee Corp	Anup Kumar
Sanjay Malhotra	Swaminathan J	Neeraj Nigam	Premises Department	K Nikhila
Sanjay Malhotra	Swaminathan J	Neeraj Nigam	Secretary’s Department	Yarasi Jayakumar
Sanjay Malhotra	Swaminathan J	Sonali Sen Gupta	Consumer Education & Protection Dept	Dr. Neena Rohit Jain
Sanjay Malhotra	Swaminathan J	Sonali Sen Gupta	Financial Inclusion & Development Dept	Nisha Nambiar
Sanjay Malhotra	Swaminathan J	Sonali Sen Gupta	Inspection Department	Gautam Prasad Borah
Sanjay Malhotra	Swaminathan J	Sonali Sen Gupta	Legal Department	Unnikrishnan A
Sanjay Malhotra	Swaminathan J	Usha Janakiraman	Supervision (Risk, Analytics & VAS)	Monisha Chakraborty
Sanjay Malhotra	Swaminathan J	Usha Janakiraman	Supervision (Supervisory Assessment)	Monisha Chakraborty
Sanjay Malhotra	Dr. Poonam Gupta	Arnab Kumar Chowdhury	International Department	Yogesh Dayal
Sanjay Malhotra	Dr. Poonam Gupta	Arnab Kumar Chowdhury	Financial Markets Operations Dept	Seshsayee G
Sanjay Malhotra	Dr. Poonam Gupta	Sanjay Kumar Hansda	Economic & Policy Research	Rajib Das
Sanjay Malhotra	Dr. Poonam Gupta	Sanjay Kumar Hansda	Financial Stability Department	Indranil Chakraborty
Sanjay Malhotra	Dr. Poonam Gupta	Indranil Bhattacharyya	Monetary Policy Department	Rekha Misra
Sanjay Malhotra	Dr. Poonam Gupta	Ravi Shankar	Statistics & Information Management	Senthil Kumar N.
Sanjay Malhotra	Shirish Chandra Murmu	Vivek Deep	Currency Management	Sanjeev Prakash
Sanjay Malhotra	Shirish Chandra Murmu	R. Lakshmi Kanth Rao	Regulation (Conduct & Operations)	Jyoti Prakash Sharma
Sanjay Malhotra	Shirish Chandra Murmu	R. Lakshmi Kanth Rao	Regulation (Prudential Regulation)	Jyoti Prakash Sharma
Sanjay Malhotra	Shirish Chandra Murmu	Charulatha S. Kar	Communication Department	Brij Raj
Sanjay Malhotra	Shirish Chandra Murmu	Charulatha S. Kar	Enforcement Department	Minal A. Jain
Sanjay Malhotra	Shirish Chandra Murmu	Gunveer Singh	Payment & Settlement Systems	Gunveer Singh
Sanjay Malhotra	Rohit Jain	Radha Shyam Ratho	Foreign Exchange Dept.	Aditya Gaiha
Sanjay Malhotra	Rohit Jain	Radha Shyam Ratho	Financial Markets Regulation Dept	Dimple Bhandia
Sanjay Malhotra	Rohit Jain	Radha Shyam Ratho	External Investments & Operations	Sundar Murthi
Sanjay Malhotra	Rohit Jain	Radha Shyam Ratho	Internal Debt Management	Rakesh Tripathy
Sanjay Malhotra	Rohit Jain	Ajay Kumar	Rajbhasha Dept.	N Sara Rajendra Kumar
Sanjay Malhotra	Rohit Jain	Ajay Kumar	Risk Monitoring Dept.	Dr. Ishan Shukla
Sanjay Malhotra	Rohit Jain	P. Vasudevan	FinTech Dept.	Suvendu Pati
Sanjay Malhotra	Rohit Jain	P. Vasudevan	IT Dept.	Shailendra Trivedi
Sanjay Malhotra	Rohit Jain	P. Vasudevan	CSB (Non-budget)	Suman Nath
Sanjay Malhotra	Rohit Jain	Sudha Balakrishnan	CSB (Budget & Funds)	Suman Nath
Sanjay Malhotra	Rohit Jain	Sudha Balakrishnan	Govt & Bank Accounts Dept.	Sangeeta Lalwani

RBI Officers' Ranks and Basic Pay
Level	Basic Pay (₹/month)	Rank in the RBI	Description	Equivalent Rank in the Government of India
1	₹250,000 (US$2,700)	Governor	Head of the Reserve Bank of India	Minister of State
2	₹225,000 (US$2,400)	Deputy Governor	Senior executive assisting the Governor	Secretary
3	₹312,000 (US$3,300)—₹332,000 (US$3,500)	Executive Director	Heads major departments and policy functions	Additional Secretary
4	₹257,500 (US$2,800)—₹293,500 (US$3,100)	Chief General Manager (CGM) Grade F Officer	Senior regional/departmental head	Joint Secretary
5	₹167,000 (US$1,800)—₹236,700 (US$2,500)	General Manager (GM) Grade E Officer	Division-level head	Director
6	₹153,200 (US$1,600)—₹195,400 (US$2,100)	Deputy General Manager (DGM) Grade D Officer	Entry to the Senior management role	Director
7	₹110,850 (US$1,200)—₹164,800 (US$1,800)	Assistant General Manager (AGM) Grade C Officer	Supervisory management role	Deputy Secretary
8	₹78,450 (US$840)—₹141,600 (US$1,500)	Manager Grade B Officer	Entry-to-mid officer handling regulatory and policy work	Under Secretary
9	₹62,500 (US$670)—₹126,100 (US$1,300)	Assistant Manager Grade A Officer	Junior officer level	Assistant Secretary; Group A
10	₹29,000 (US$310)—₹78,640 (US$840)	Assistant	Clerical staff, attendants, operational support	UDC / LDC / MTS level support staff Group C

Note: Apart from the Basic Pay, every officers and staffs receive Special Allowance, Grade Allowance, Dearness Allowance, Local Compensatory Allowance, Special Grade Allowance, Learning Allowance, House Rent Allowance, other monthly allowances and annual allowances as per rules in force from time to time.

== Branches and support bodies ==
RBI Offices in India

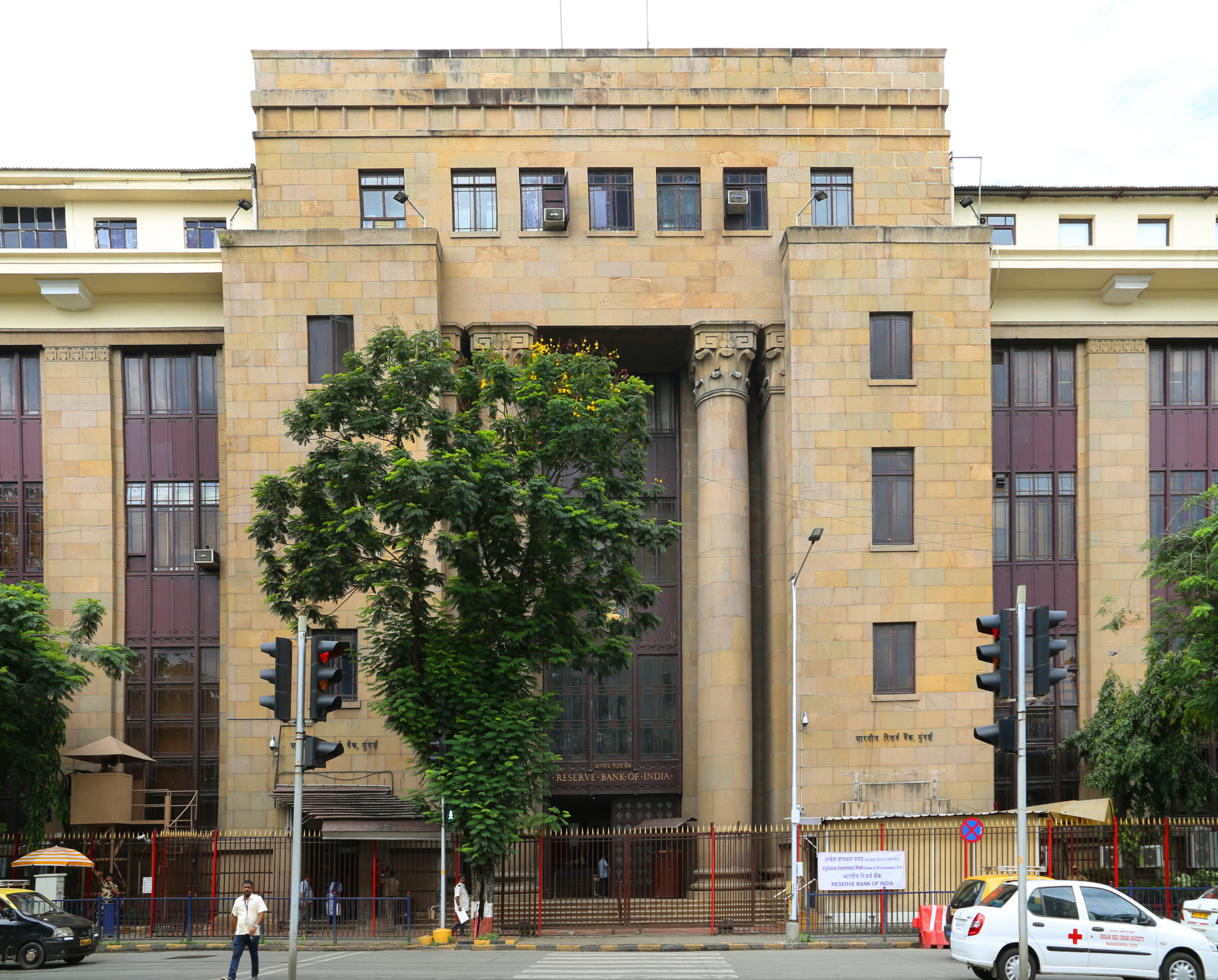
RBI Regional Office in Mumbai

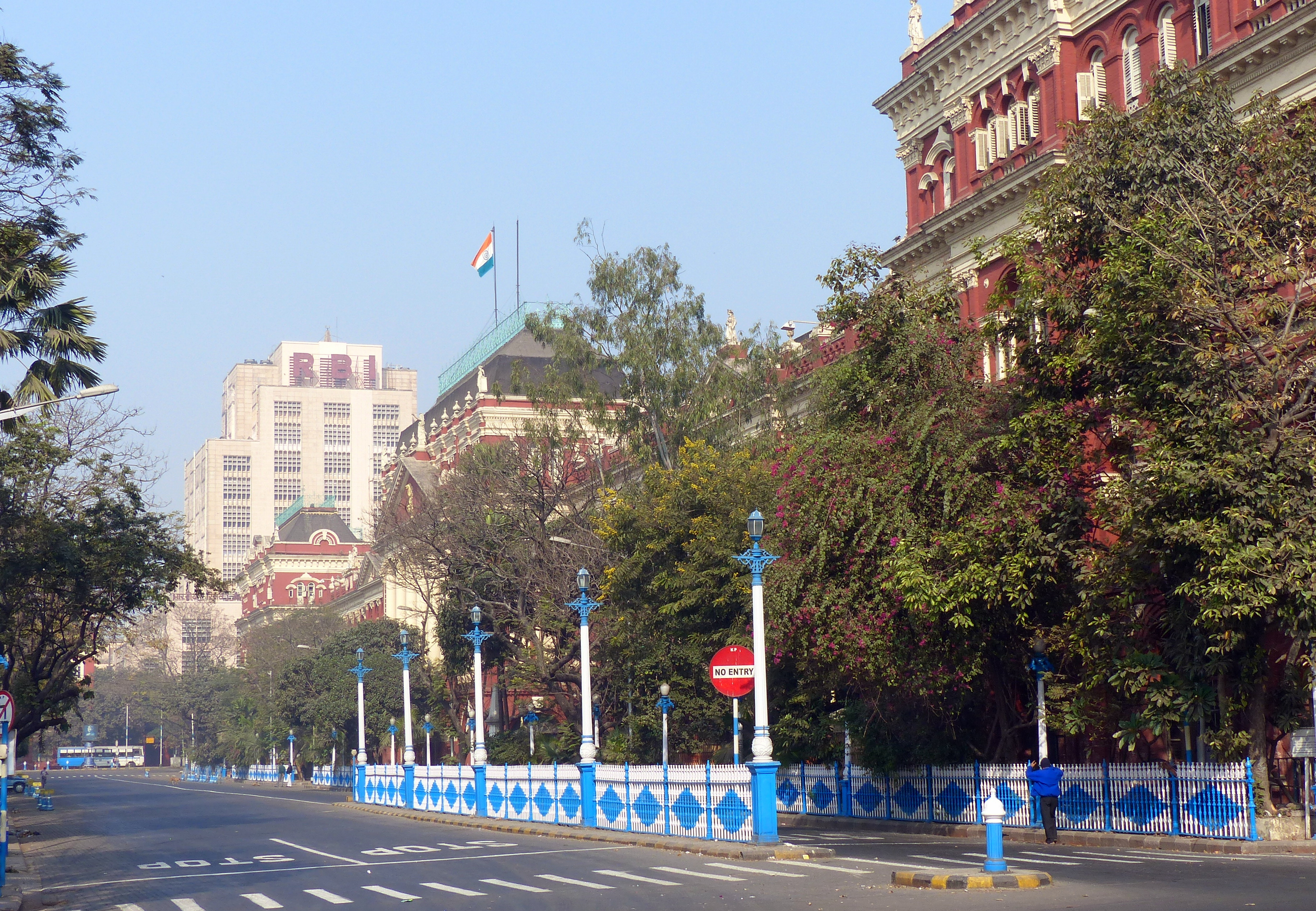
RBI Regional Office, near the Mahakaran (CM office) in Kolkata

The RBI has four regional representations: North in New Delhi, South in Chennai, East in Kolkata and West in Mumbai. The representations are formed by five members, appointed for four years by the central government and with the advice of the central board of directors serve as a forum for regional banks and to deal with delegated tasks from the Central Board.

RBI has 31 branches in India. Mostly all are in Capital cities, exceptions are the Kanpur, Nagpur and Ahmedabad Reserve Bank branches. Kanpur office was established in 1935 as one of the five original branch offices, Nagpur office was established in 1956, while the Ahmedabad office was established in 1950.

It has 3 training colleges for its officers, viz. Reserve Bank Staff College Chennai, Reserve Bank of India Academy Mumbai, and Reserve Bank of India College of Agricultural Banking Pune. There are three autonomous institutions run by RBI namely National Institute of Bank Management (NIBM), Indira Gandhi Institute of Development Research (IGIDR), Institute for Development and Research in Banking Technology (IDRBT). There are also four zonal training centres at Mumbai, Chennai, Kolkata, and New Delhi.

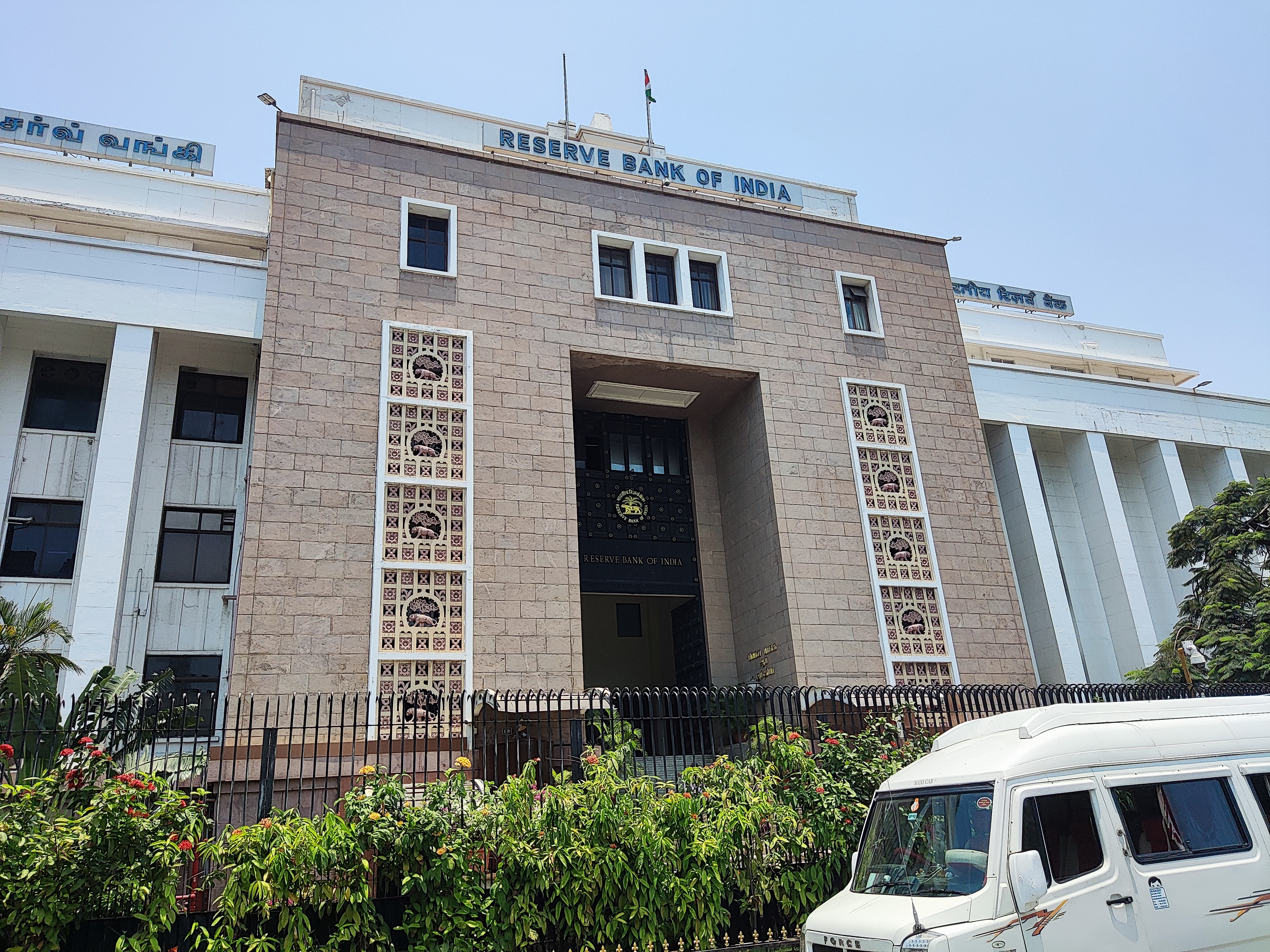
RBI Regional Office in Chennai

RBI Regional Office in New Delhi

The Board of Financial Supervision (BFS), formed in November 1994, serves as a CCBD committee to control the financial institutions. It has four members, appointed for two years, and takes measures to strength the role of statutory auditors in the financial sector, external monitoring, and internal controlling systems. The Tarapore committee was set up by the Reserve Bank of India under the chairmanship of former RBI deputy governor S. S. Tarapore to "lay the road map" to capital account convertibility. The five-member committee recommended a three-year time frame for complete convertibility by 1999–2000.

On 8 December 2017, Surekha Marandi, executive director (ED) of Reserve Bank of India, said RBI will open an office in the north-eastern state of Arunachal Pradesh.

== Functions ==
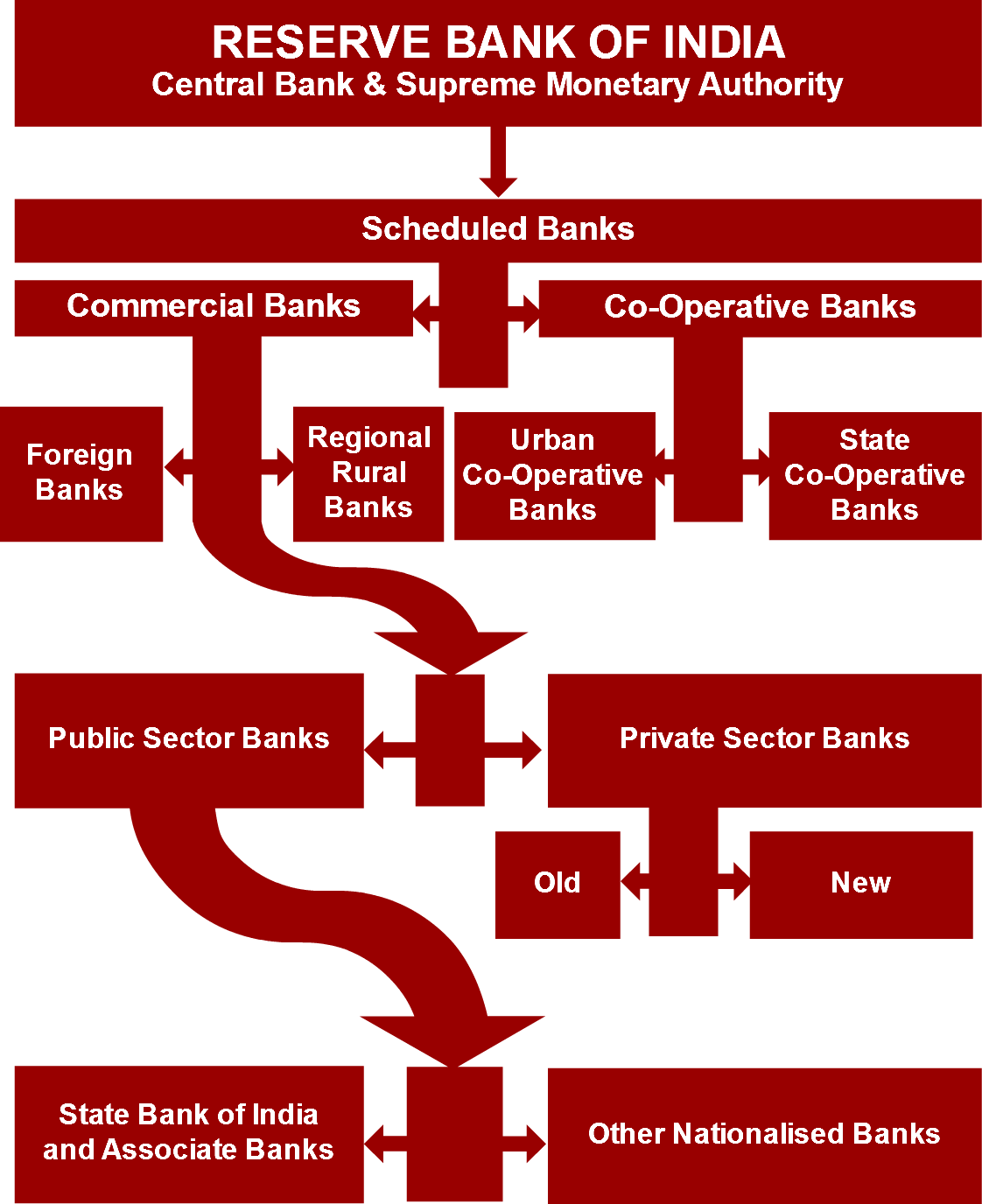
Reserve Bank of India Scheduled Structure

The central bank of any country executes many functions such as overseeing monetary policy, issuing currency, managing foreign exchange, working as a bank for government and as a banker of scheduled commercial banks. It also works for overall economic growth of the country. The purposes for which the RBI has been established as India's central bank has been spelt out in the preamble to the RBI Act:

i) "to regulate the issue of banknotes and the keeping of reserves with a view to securing monetary stability in India and generally to operate the currency and credit system of the country to its advantage; and

(ii) that it is essential to have a modern monetary policy framework to meet the challenge of an increasingly complex economy and the primary objective of the monetary policy is to maintain price stability while keeping in mind the objective of growth" ...to regulate the issue of Bank Notes and keeping of reserves with a view to securing monetary stability in India and generally to operate the currency and credit system of the country to its advantage.

=== Financial supervision ===
The primary objective of RBI is to undertake consolidated supervision of the financial sector comprising commercial banks, financial institutions, and non-banking finance companies.

The board is constituted by co-opting four directors from the Central Board as members for a term of two years and is chaired by the governor. The deputy governors of the reserve bank are ex-officio members. One deputy governor, usually the deputy governor in charge of banking regulation and supervision, is nominated as the vice-chairman of the board. The board is required to meet normally once every month. It considers inspection reports and other supervisory issues placed before it by the supervisory departments.

Board for Financial Supervision (BFS) through the Audit Sub-Committee also aims at upgrading the quality of the statutory audit and internal audit functions in banks and financial institutions. The audit sub-committee includes deputy governor as the chairman and two directors of the Central Board as members. The BFS oversees the functioning of the Department of Banking Supervision (DBS), the Department of Non-Banking Supervision (DNBS) and the Financial Institutions Division (FID) and gives directions on the regulatory and supervisory issues.

=== Regulator and supervisor of the financial system ===
As a regulator and supervisor of the Indian banking system it ensures financial stability and public confidence in the banking system. It prescribes broad parameters of banking operations within which the country's banking and financial system functions. Its objectives are to maintain public confidence in the system, protect depositors' interest and provide cost-effective banking services to the public. The Banking Ombudsman Scheme has been formulated by the Reserve Bank of India (RBI) for effective addressing of complaints by bank customers. The RBI controls the monetary supply, monitors economic indicators like the gross domestic product and has to decide the design of the rupee banknotes as well as coins. RBI uses methods like on-site inspections, off-site surveillance, scrutiny and periodic meetings to supervise new bank licences, setting capital requirements and regulating interest rates in specific areas. RBI is currently focused on implementing norms.

=== Regulator and supervisor of the payment and settlement systems ===
Payment and settlement systems play an important role in improving overall economic efficiency. The Payment and Settlement Systems Act of 2007 (PSS Act) gives the Reserve Bank oversight authority, including regulation and supervision, for the payment and settlement systems in the country. In this role, the RBI focuses on the development and functioning of safe, secure and efficient payment and settlement mechanisms. Two payment systems National Electronic Fund Transfer (NEFT) and Real-Time Gross Settlement (RTGS) allow individuals, companies and firms to transfer funds from one bank to another. These facilities can only be used for transferring money within the country.

From 16 December 2019, one can transfer money online using the NEFT route 24x7, i.e., any time of the day and any day of the week. The Reserve Bank of India stated earlier in December 2019 that bank customers will be able to transfer funds through NEFT around the clock on all days including weekends and holidays from 16-December. In RTGS, transactions are processed continuously 24x7.In June 2019, RBI decided to remove charges on RTGS and NEFT.

=== Banker and debt manager to government ===
Just as individuals need a bank to carry out their financial transactions effectively and efficiently, governments also need a bank to carry out their financial transactions. The RBI serves this purpose for the Government of India (GoI). The RBI is also a banker to the government and performs merchant banking function for the central and the state governments. As a banker to the Government of India, the RBI maintains its accounts, receive payments into and make payments out of these accounts. The RBI also helps the GoI to raise money from the public via issuing bonds and government-approved securities. In September 2019, a decision at RBI directors meet was taken to change the RBI financial accounting year to March–April to align itself with the central government calendar instead of the current June–July year.

RBI issue taxable bonds for investments. From 1 July 2020, RBI is offering Floating Rate Savings Bonds, 2020 (Taxable) – FRSB 2020 (T). The interest on the bonds is payable semi-annually on 1 January and 1 July every year. The coupon on 1 January 2021 shall be paid at 7.15%. The Interest rate for next half-year will be reset every six months, the first reset being on 1 January 2021. There is no option to pay interest on cumulative basis.

=== Managing foreign exchange ===
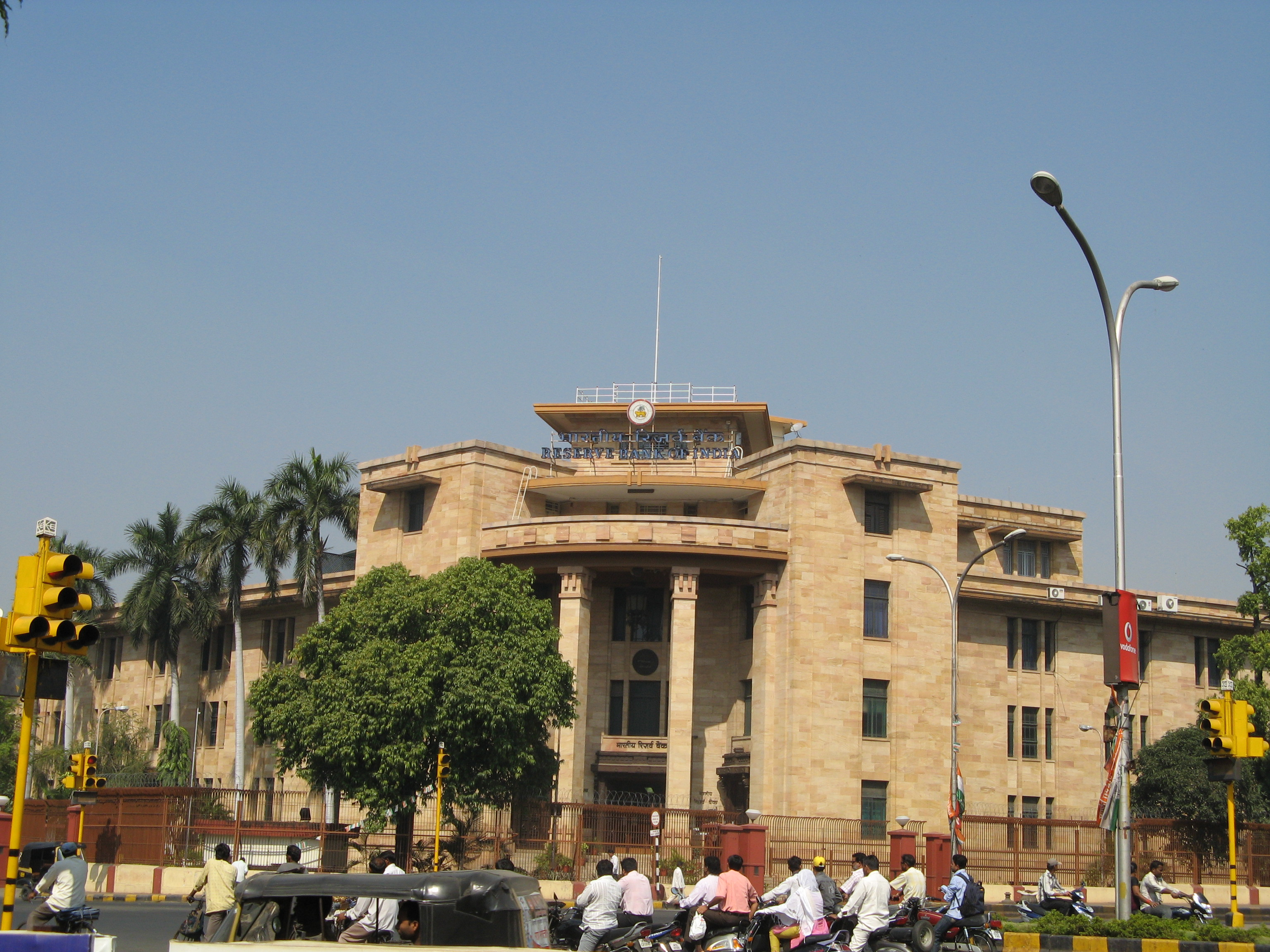
Nagpur branch holds most of India's gold deposits.

The central bank manages to reach different goals of the Foreign Exchange Management Act, 1999. Their objective is to facilitate external trade and payment and promote orderly development and maintenance of foreign exchange market in India.

With the increasing integration of the Indian economy with the global economy arising from greater trade and capital flows, the foreign exchange market has evolved as a key segment of the Indian financial market and the RBI has an important role to play in regulating and managing this segment. The RBI manages forex and gold reserves of the nation.

On a given day, the foreign exchange rate reflects the demand for and supply of foreign exchange arising from trade and capital transactions. The RBI's Financial Markets Department (FMD) participates in the foreign exchange market by undertaking sales/purchases of foreign currency to ease volatility in periods of excess demand for/supply of foreign currency.

=== Issue of currency ===
Other than the Government of India, the Reserve Bank of India is the sole body authorised to issue banknotes in India.

The bank also destroys banknotes when they are not fit for circulation. All the money issued by the central bank is its monetary liability, i.e., the central bank is obliged to back the currency with assets of equal value, to enhance public confidence in paper currency. The objectives are to issue banknotes and give the public adequate supply of the same, to maintain the currency and credit system of the country to utilise it in its best advantage, and to maintain the reserves.

The RBI maintains the economic structure of the country so that it can achieve the objective of price stability as well as economic development because both objectives are diverse in themselves.

For the printing of notes, RBI uses four facilities:

- The Security Printing and Minting Corporation of India Limited (SPMCIL), a wholly owned company of the Government of India, has printing presses at Nashik, Maharashtra and Dewas, Madhya Pradesh.
- The Bharatiya Reserve Bank Note Mudran Private Limited (BRBNMPL), owned by the RBI, has printing facilities in Mysore, Karnataka and Salboni, West Bengal.

For the minting of coins, SPMCIL has four mints at Mumbai, Noida, Kolkata and Hyderabad for coin production.

Whilst coins are minted by, and ₹1 notes are issued by the Government of India (GoI), the RBI works as an agent of GoI for the distribution and handling of coins. RBI also works to prevent counterfeiting of currency by regularly upgrading security features of currency.

The RBI is authorised to issue notes with face values of up to ₹10,000 and coins up to ₹1,000 rupees.

New ₹500 and ₹2,000 notes were issued on 8 November 2016. The old series of ₹1,000 and ₹500 notes were banned on 8 November 2016, and are no longer in use.

Earlier ₹1,000 notes have been discarded by the RBI.

On 19 May 2023 the Reserve Bank of India announced the discontinuation of the Rs 2,000 denomination banknotes from circulation.

This decision follows the cessation of its printing in 2018-19 due to the ample availability of other denominations and the note's limited use in transactions. This move aligns with the RBI's "Clean Note Policy", addressing the notes nearing the end of their lifespan and maintaining currency efficiency.

=== Bankers' bank ===
Reserve Bank of India also works as a central bank where commercial banks are account holders and can deposit money. RBI maintains banking accounts of all scheduled banks. Commercial banks create credit. It is the duty of the RBI to control the credit through the CRR, repo rate, and open market operations. As the bankers' bank, the RBI facilitates the clearing of cheques between the commercial banks and helps the inter-bank transfer of funds. It can grant financial accommodation to schedule banks. It acts as the lender of the last resort by providing emergency advances to the banks.

=== Financial Intelligence ===
The RBI routinely shares financial intelligence (FININT) with the Economic Intelligence Council (EIC), Regional Economic Intelligence Committee (REIC), Financial Intelligence Unit (FIU) and other agencies of the Indian Intelligence Community to counter the Money laundering, terrorism financing and secure the national economic security. The RBI Governor is a member of the Strategic Policy Group (SPG) which is an apex governmental policy making body under the National Security Council Secretariat (NSCS), chaired by the National Security Advisor (NSA). The RBI Governor collaborates within this group to assist the NSA in strategic planning, addressing critical cross-sector security challenges and provides vital economic intelligence (ECOINT), financial risk assessments, and policy inputs necessary for safeguarding the country's economic security, managing external resource vulnerabilities, and mitigating system-level financial risks.

=== Detection of fake currency ===
On 22 January 2014; RBI gave a press release stating that after 31 March 2014, it will completely withdraw from circulation of all banknotes issued prior to 2005. From 1 April 2014, the public will be required to approach banks for exchanging these notes. Banks will provide exchange facility for these notes until further communication. The reserve bank has also clarified that the notes issued before 2005 will continue to be legal tender. This would mean that banks are required to exchange the notes for their customers as well as for non-customers. After 1 July 2014, to exchange more than 15 pieces of '500 and '1000 notes, non-customers must furnish proof of identity and residence as well as show aadhar to the bank branch in order to exchange the notes.

This move from the reserve bank is expected to unearth black money held in cash. As the new currency notes have added increased security features, they would help in curbing the menace of fake currency.

=== Developmental role ===
The central bank has to perform a wide range of promotional functions to support national objectives and industries. The RBI faces a lot of inter-sectoral and local inflation-related problems. Some of these problems are results of the dominant part of the public sector.

Key tools in this effort include Priority Sector Lending such as agriculture, micro and small enterprises (MSE), housing and education. RBI work towards strengthening and supporting small local banks and encourage banks to open branches in rural areas to include large section of society in banking net.

=== Custodian to foreign exchange ===
The Reserve Bank has custody of the country's reserves of international currency, and this enables the Reserve Bank to deal with crisis connected with adverse balance of payments position.

=== CSD for G-Sec (government securities) ===
Public Debt Office (PDO) acts as CSD (Central Securities Depository) for G-Sec.

=== MIFOR (Mumbai interbank forward offer rate) ===
With LIBOR cessation in 2021, RBI is set to replace MIFOR with a new benchmark. MIFOR has LIBOR as one of the components and used in interest rate swap (IRS) markets.

== Policy rates and reserve ratios ==
Rates as of 9 April 2025
Policy rates
Policy repo rate	6.0%
Reverse repo rate	3.35%
Marginal standing facility rate	6.25%
Bank rate	6.25%
Reserve ratios
Cash reserve ratio (CRR)	4.0%
Statutory liquidity ratio (SLR)	18.00%
Lending and deposit rates
Base rate	8.85%–10.10%
Marginal cost of funds-based overnight lending rate (MCLR)	7.95%–8.35%
Savings deposit rate	2.70%–3.00%
Term deposit rate for > 1 year	6.00%–7.25%

=== Repo rate ===
Repo (repurchase) rate also known as the benchmark interest rate is the rate at which the RBI lends money to the commercial banks for a short-term (a maximum of 90 days). When the repo rate increases, borrowing from RBI becomes more expensive. If RBI wants to make it more expensive for the banks to borrow money, it increases the repo rate similarly, if it wants to make it cheaper for banks to borrow money it reduces the repo rate. If the repo rate is increased, banks can't carry out their business at a profit whereas the very opposite happens when the repo rate is cut down. Generally, repo rates are cut down whenever the country needs to progress in banking and economy.

If banks want to borrow money (for short term, usually overnight) from RBI then banks have to charge this interest rate. Banks have to pledge government securities as collateral. This kind of deal happens through a re-purchase agreement. If a bank wants to borrow, it has to provide government securities at least worth ₹ 1 billion (could be more because of margin requirement which is 5%–10% of loan amount) and agree to repurchase them at ₹1.07 billion (US$11 million) at the end of borrowing period. So the bank has paid ₹65 million (US$690,000) as interest. This is the reason it is called repo rate.

The government securities which are provided by banks as collateral can not come from SLR quota (otherwise the SLR will go below 19.5% of NDTL and attract penalties).

To curb inflation, the RBI increases repo rate which will make borrowing costs for banks. Banks will pass this increased cost to their customers which make borrowing costly in the whole economy. Fewer people will apply for loans and aggregate demand will be reduced. This will result in inflation coming down. The RBI does the opposite to fight deflation. When the RBI reduces the repo rate, banks are not legally required to reduce their own base rate.

=== Reverse repo rate (RRR) ===
As the name suggest, reverse repo rate is just the opposite of repo rate. Reverse repo rate is the short-term borrowing rate in which commercial bank park their surplus in RBI. The reserve bank uses this tool when it feels there is too much money floating in the banking system. An increase in the reverse repo rate means that the banks will get a higher rate of interest from RBI. As a result, banks prefer to lend their money to RBI which is always safe instead of lending it to others (people, companies, etc.) which is always risky.

Repo rate signifies the rate at which liquidity is injected into the banking system by RBI, whereas reverse repo rate signifies the rate at which the central bank absorbs liquidity from the banks. Currently, reverse repo rate is 3.35%.

=== Statutory liquidity ratio (SLR) ===
Apart from the CRR, banks are required to maintain liquid assets in the form of gold, cash and approved securities. Higher liquidity ratio forces commercial banks to maintain a larger proportion of their resources in liquid form and thus reduces their capacity to grant loans and advances, thus it is an anti-inflationary impact. A higher liquidity ratio diverts the bank funds from loans and advances to investment in government and approved securities.

In well-developed economies, central banks use open market operations—buying and selling of eligible securities by the central bank in the money market—to influence the volume of cash reserves with commercial banks and thus influence the volume of loans and advances they can make to the commercial and industrial sectors. In the open money market, government securities are traded at market-related rates of interest. The RBI is resorting increasing to open market operations in recent years. Generally, the RBI uses:

1. Minimum margins for lending against specific securities.
2. A ceiling on the amounts of credit for certain purposes.
3. The discriminatory rate of interest charged on certain types of advances.

Direct credit controls in India are of three types:

1. Part of the interest rate structure, i.e., on small savings and provident funds, are administratively set.
2. Banks are mandatory required to keep 18% of their NDTL (net demand and time liabilities) in the form of liquid assets.
3. Banks are required to lend to the priority sectors to the extent of 40% of their advances.

The share of net demand and time liabilities that banks must maintain in safe and liquid assets, such as government securities, cash, and gold. Here it would be pertinent to mention the gold swap of July 2014. The present SLR is 18.00%.

=== Bank rate ===
Bank rate is defined in Section 49 of the RBI Act of 1934 as the 'standard rate at which RBI is prepared to buy or rediscount bills of exchange or other commercial papers eligible for purchase'. When banks want to borrow long term funds from the RBI, it is the interest rate which the RBI charges to them. It is currently set to 6.50%. The bank rate is not used to control money supply, but penal rates continue to be linked to the bank rate. If a bank fails to meet SLR or CRR requirements then the RBI will impose a penalty of 300 basis points above bank rate.

=== Liquidity adjustment facility (LAF) ===
Liquidity adjustment facility was introduced in 2000. LAF is a facility provided by the Reserve Bank of India to scheduled commercial banks to avail of liquidity in case of need or to park excess funds with the RBI on an overnight basis against the collateral of government securities.

RBI accepts applications for a minimum amount of ₹5 crore (US$530,000) and in multiples of ₹ 50 million thereafter.

=== Cash reserve ratio (CRR) ===
CRR refers to the ratio of bank's cash reserve balances with RBI with reference to the bank's net demand and time liabilities to ensure the liquidity and solvency of the scheduled banks. The share of net demand and time liabilities that banks must maintain as cash with the RBI. The RBI has set CRR at 4.0% A 1% change in CRR affects the economy by ₹1.37 trillion. An increase draw this amount from the economy, while a decrease injects this amount into the economy. So if a bank has ₹2 billion (US$21 million) of NDTL then it has to keep ₹80 million (US$850,000) in cash with RBI. RBI pays no interest on CRR.

=== Open market operation (OMO) ===
Open market operation is the activity of buying and selling of government securities in open market to control the supply of money in banking system. When there is excess supply of money, central bank sells government securities thereby sucking out excess liquidity. Similarly, when liquidity is tight, RBI will buy government securities and thereby inject money supply into the economy.

On 23 March 2020, Reserve Bank of India infused ₹1 trillion (short scale) through term repo auction, a massive OMOs (open market operations) purchase of government securities. The Reserve Bank is monitoring the financial market conditions and liquidity situation in the economy as COVID-19 pandemic in India fears of a recession.

=== Marginal standing facility (MSF) ===
This scheme was introduced in May 2011 and all the scheduled commercial bank can participate in this scheme. Banks can borrow up to 2.5% per cent of their respective net demand and time liabilities. The RBI receives application under this facility for a minimum amount of ₹ 10 million and in multiples of ₹ 10 million thereafter.

The important difference from repo rate is that bank can pledge government securities from its SLR quota (up to one per cent). So even if SLR goes below 20.5% by pledging SLR quota securities under MSF, the bank will not have to pay any penalty. The marginal standing facility rate currently stands at 4.25%.

== Qualitative tools ==
=== Margin requirements ===
Loan-to-value (LTV) is the ratio of loan amount to the actual value of asset purchased.

The RBI regulates this ratio so as to control the amount a bank can lend to its customers. For example, an individual wants to buy a car using borrowed money and the car's value is ₹1 million. If the LTV is set to 70% he can borrow a maximum of ₹700,000.

The RBI can decrease or increase to curb inflation or deflation respectively.

=== Moral suasion ===
Under this measure, the RBI try to persuade banks through meetings, conferences, media specific things under certain economic trends. For example, when the RBI reduces repo rate, it asks banks to reduce their base rate as well. Another example of this measure is to ask banks to reduce their non-performing assets.

== Demonetisation ==
=== 2016 demonetisation ===
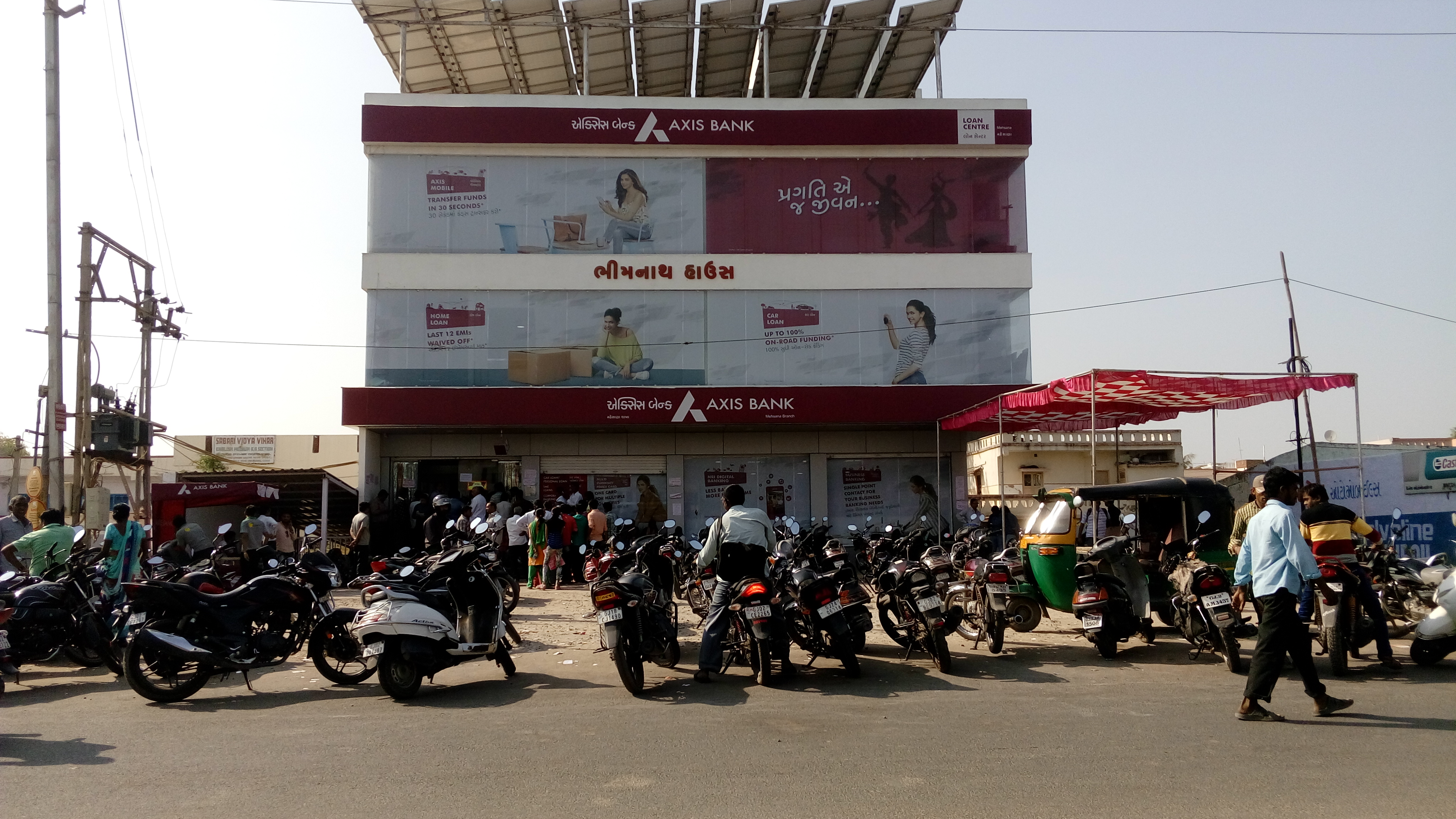
People gathered at ATM of Axis Bank in Mehsana, Gujarat to withdraw cash following deposit of demonetised currency notes in bank on 15 November 2016.

On 8 November 2016, the Government of India announced the demonetisation of all ₹ 500 and ₹ 1,000 banknotes of the Mahatma Gandhi Series despite being warned by the Reserve Bank of India (RBI). The government claimed that the action would curtail the shadow economy and crack down on the use of illicit and counterfeit cash to fund illegal activity and terrorism.

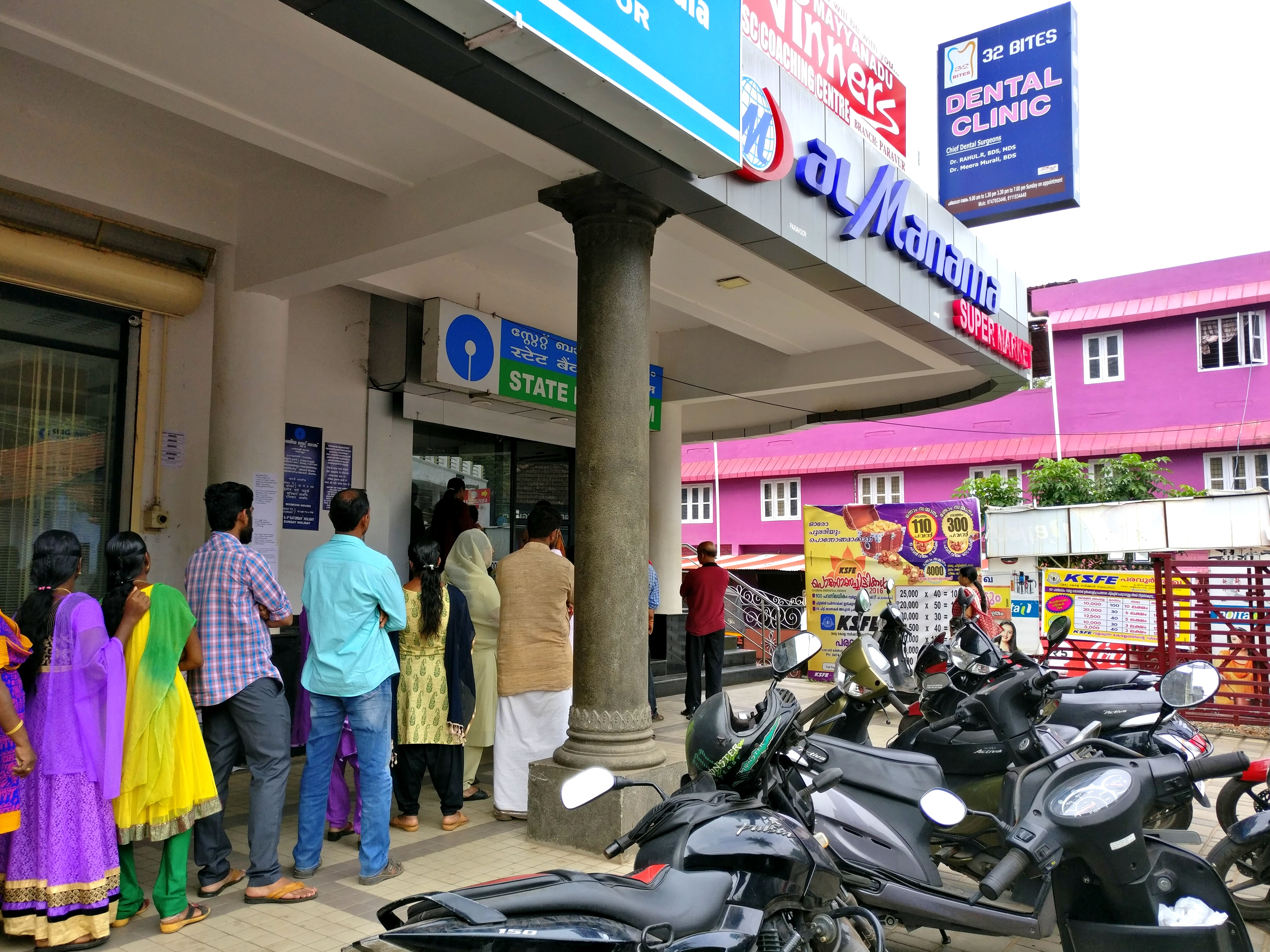
Long queue in front of SBI ATM at Paravur near the city of Kollam in Kerala, 19 November 2016

The Reserve Bank of India laid down a detailed procedure for the exchange of the demonetised banknotes with new ₹ 500 and ₹ 2,000 banknotes of the Mahatma Gandhi New Series and ₹ 100 banknotes of the preceding Mahatma Gandhi Series. The key points were:

- Citizens had until 30 December 2016 to tender their old banknotes at any office of the RBI or any bank branch and credit the value into their respective bank accounts.
- Cash withdrawals from bank accounts were restricted to ₹10,000 (US$110) per day and ₹20,000 (US$210) per week per account from 10 to 13 November 2016. This limit was increased to ₹24,000 (US$260) per week from 14 November.
- For immediate cash needs, the old banknotes could be exchanged for the new ₹500 and ₹2,000 banknotes as well as ₹100 banknotes over the counter of bank branches by filling up a requisition form along with a valid ID proof. It was announced that this facility would be available until 30 December 2016.
  - Initially, the limit was fixed at ₹4,000 (US$43) per person from 8 to 13 November 2016.
  - This limit was increased to ₹4,500 (US$48) per person from 14 to 17 November 2016.
  - The limit was reduced to ₹2,000 (US$21) per person from 18 November 2016.
  - All exchange of banknotes was abruptly stopped from 25 November 2016.
- Initially, all ATMs were dispensing banknotes of only ₹ 50 and ₹100 denominations and cash withdrawals from ATMs were restricted to ₹2,000 (US$21) per day. From 14 November onwards, ATMs were recalibrated to dispense new ₹500 and ₹2,000 notes and to allow a maximum withdrawal of ₹2,500 (US$27) per day, while other ATMs dispensing banknotes of only ₹50 and ₹100 denominations will allow a maximum withdrawal of ₹2,000 (US$21) per day.

However, exceptions were given to petrol, CNG and gas stations, government hospitals, railway and airline booking counters, state-government recognised dairies and ration stores, and crematoriums to accept the old ₹500 and ₹1,000 banknotes until 11 November 2016, which was later extended to 14 November 2016 and once again to 24 November 2016. International airports were also instructed to facilitate an exchange of notes amounting to a total value of ₹5,000 (US$53) for foreign tourists and outbound passengers.

Under the revised guidelines issued on 17 November 2016, families were allowed to withdraw ₹250,000 (US$2,700) for wedding expenses from one account provided it was KYC compliant. The rules were also changed for farmers who are permitted to withdraw ₹25,000 (US$270) per week from their accounts against crop loan.

=== Cash crunch and demerits ===
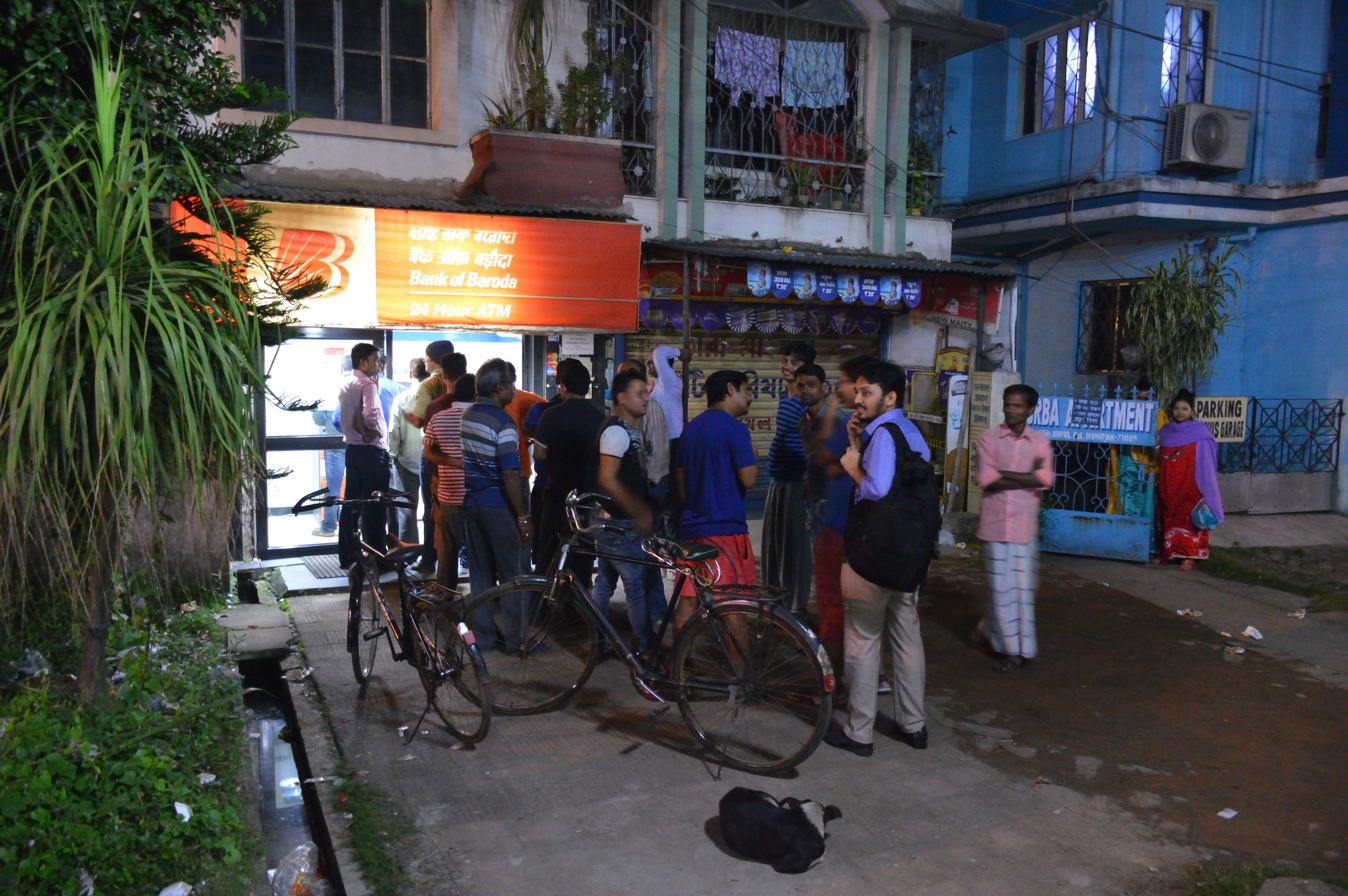
Queue at a Bank of Baroda's ATM for ₹100 banknotes in Howrah, on 8 November 2016, 22:23 (IST)

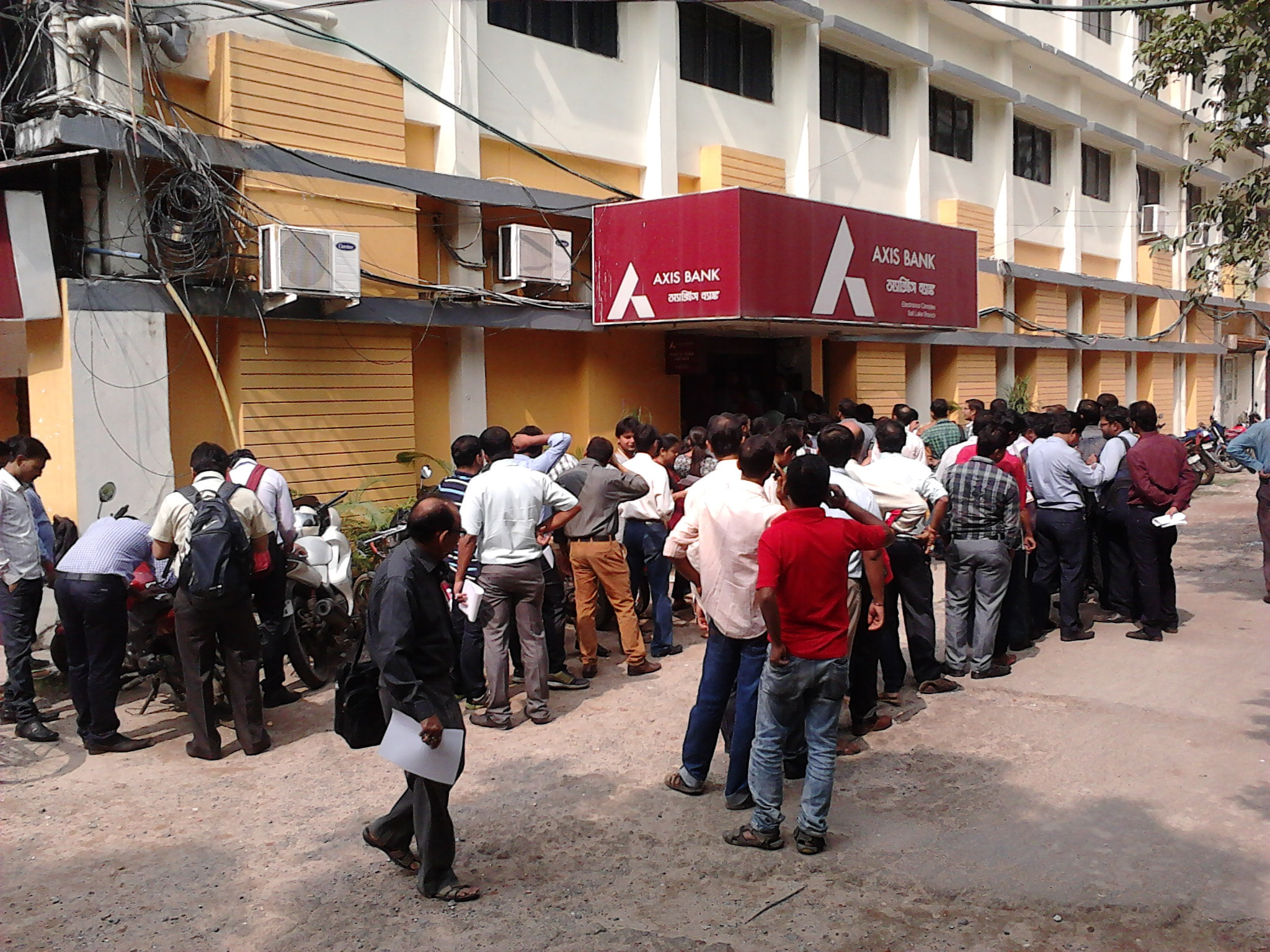
People queue outside Axis Bank to deposit and exchange old ₹500 and ₹1,000 banknotes in Kolkata on 10 November 2016

The scarcity of cash due to demonetisation led to chaos, and most people holding old banknotes faced difficulties exchanging them due to endless lines outside banks and ATMs across India, which became a daily routine for millions of people waiting to deposit or exchange the ₹500 and ₹1,000 banknotes since 9 November. ATMs were running out of cash after a few hours of being functional, and around half the ATMs in the country were non-functional. Sporadic violence was reported in New Delhi, but there were no reports of any grievous injury, people attacked bank premises and ATMs, and a ration shop was looted in Madhya Pradesh after the shop owner refused to accept ₹500 banknotes.

=== Merits ===
- It gave the country a ₹5 trillion advantage as there was a huge spike in country's tax base and addition of 100,000 more pan card holders.
- There was a very big spike in digital transaction even small town and cities people adopted paying digitally for goods and services leading to sustained growth of non-cash payments.

== Criticism ==
In July 2015, under governor Raghuram Rajan, the RBI began an asset quality review that required banks to recognise loans they had been restructuring or carrying as performing. Rajan later said the bad loans uncovered were "at least two or three times" what he had expected; gross non-performing assets of all banks rose from about ₹3.23 lakh crore (equivalent to ₹5.3 trillion or US$57 billion in 2026) in March 2015 to over ₹10.37 lakh crore (equivalent to ₹15 trillion or US$160 billion in 2026) in March 2018. Critics have termed the episode a "regulatory failure" in supervising India's banking industry.

However, governor Rajan strongly countered critics by arguing that the Asset Quality Review (AQR) did not create the bad loans; it merely forced banks to lift the veil on them. He likened the AQR to an "anesthetic that allows the bank to perform extensive necessary surgery". The government (via subsequent Parliament submissions and Economic Surveys) shifted the blame upstream. They countered that the root cause was the indiscriminate and aggressive lending practices between 2006 and 2012, coupled with project delays, cost overruns, and corporate over-leveraging.

The RBI has also been criticised for alleged supervisory failures in individual lenders, including the collapse of Infrastructure Leasing & Financial Services in 2018, the Punjab National Bank Scam involving Nirav Modi, fraud at Punjab and Maharashtra Co-operative Bank in 2019, and Yes Bank in 2020..

However, the RBI and the government countered that PNB officials deliberately kept fraudulent transactions outside the core banking system to evade audit loops. Furthermore, the RBI had issued circulars as early as 2016 warning banks to link SWIFT to their core software—a directive PNB failed to implement.

Joy Thomas (aka Junaid Khan), former MD of the PMC bank admitted the exposure of the bank to the troubled realty company Housing Development and Infrastructure Limited (HDIL) and also stated that the company had been violating the RBI rules for 5–6 years now. Of the overall loan book of ₹8,300 crores, PMC bank loans to HDIL stood at ₹6,226 crore, about 73% of total loans of the bank. Later the RBI placed PMC Bank under regulatory directions in September 2019 due to a massive financial fraud involving hidden loans to HDIL, and subsequently amalgamated PMC Bank with Unity Small Finance Bank Ltd (USFBL) on January 25, 2022. A group of PMC Bank depositors challenged the amalgamation. In March 2026, the Bombay High Court upheld the merger of PMC Bank with Unity Small Finance Bank, ruling it protects depositors' interests and ensures full repayment.

Regarding Yes Bank crisis, RBI governor Shaktikanta Das stated that the matter would be resolved swiftly; Ministry of Finance under Finance Minister, Nirmala Sitharaman announced a proposed turnaround plan under which the State Bank of India (SBI) would take a 49% stake in Yes Bank and introduce a new board. On 13 March 2020, the Union Cabinet approved the reconstruction scheme for Yes Bank, stating that within three days of the notification of the scheme, the moratorium would be lifted. During this reconstruction, seven investors infused ₹120 billion (US$1.62 billion) in Yes Bank, and Prashant Kumar was proposed as it new CEO. These investors included SBI, ICICI Bank, HDFC Bank, Axis Bank, Kotak Mahindra Bank, Rakesh Jhunjhunwala, Radhakishan Damani and Azim Premji Trust. The bank came out of the moratorium and resumed full-fledged banking operations on 18 March 2020.

== All India financial institutions separated from Reserve Bank of India ==
Regulatory bodies:

- Export-Import Bank of India
- National Bank for Agriculture and Rural Development
- Small Industries Development Bank of India
- National Housing Bank

== Attempt to caution customers against cryptocurrencies ==
In April 2018, RBI banned banks from supporting crypto transactions after cases of fraud through virtual currencies were reported. However, the Supreme Court struck down the ban in March 2020. Among the reasons cited was that cryptocurrencies were not illegal though unregulated in India.

On June 30, 2025, the RBI directed all banks to use the Financial Fraud Risk Indicator (FRI), a tool developed by the Department of Telecommunications. The FRI flags mobile numbers linked to fraud in real time, helping banks prevent online financial scams.

== Publications ==
A report titled Trend and Progress of Banking in India is published annually, as required by the Banking Regulation Act, 1949. The report sums up trends and developments throughout the financial sector. Starting in April 2014, the Reserve Bank of India publishes bi-monthly policy updates.

== Committees set up by RBI ==
=== KV Kamath Committee ===
In August 2020, RBI set up a five membered Committee under the chairmanship of KV Kamath, the former CEO of the ICICI bank in order to make recommendations on the norm for resolution of COVID-19 related stressed loans. In order to restructure the loans up to ₹150 billion, the expert Committee was tasked with coming up with a sector specific plan for successful resolution of the stressed loans. The parameters were to include aspects related to leverage, liquidity and debt serviceability.

== Training academies ==
- Reserve Bank Staff College, Chennai
- Reserve Bank of India Academy, Mumbai
- Reserve Bank of India College of Agricultural Banking, Pune

The 3 training colleges of the Reserve Bank of India, train the officers of the Reserve Bank of India, and the banking industry.

== Research units ==
- National Institute of Bank Management
- Institute for Development and Research in Banking Technology
- Indira Gandhi Institute of Development Research
- Indian Institute of Bank Management

== Subsidiaries ==
=== Indira Gandhi Institute of Development Research ===
Indira Gandhi Institute of Development Research is an advanced research institution established by the RBI and a deemed to be university

=== Bharatiya Reserve Bank Note Mudran ===
BRBNM was established by RBI on 3 February 1995 to enable RBI to bridge the gap between maintain, demand and supply of Indian rupee notes in the country.

=== Deposit Insurance and Credit Guarantee Corporation ===
Deposit Insurance and Credit Guarantee Corporation was established by RBI for the purpose of providing insurance of deposits and guaranteeing of credit facilities to all Indian banks.

=== Reserve Bank of India Information Technology ===
It has been set up by RBI to serve its information technology and cybersecurity needs and to improve the cyber resilience of the Indian banking industry.

On Nov 7, 2023 RBI published Master Direction on Information Technology Governance, Risk, Controls and Assurance Practices with an objective to tighten the governance framework for technology within banking segment.

=== Indian Financial Technology and Allied Services ===
Indian Financial Technology and Allied Services was established by RBI in February 2015, mandated to design, deploy and support IT-related services to all Banks and Financial Institutions in the country and also to the Reserve Bank of India. It manages and operates the Financial messaging platform (SFMS) that comprises Real-Time Gross Settlement and National Electronic Funds Transfer. INFINET is also managed by IFTAS. IFTAS has taken over the Indian FInancial NETwork (INFINET), Structured Financial Messaging System (SFMS) and the Indian Banking Community Cloud (IBCC) from the IDRBT, effective 1 April 2016.

=== Reserve Bank of India Innovation Hub ===
Shaktikanta Das inaugurated the Reserve Bank Innovation Hub (RBIH) on 24 March 2022 in Bengaluru as Section-8 company under Companies Act, 2013, with an initial investment of ₹100 crore to encourage and nurture financial innovation sustainably through an institutional set-up. RBIH meant to create an ecosystem that focuses on promoting access to financial services and products for the low-income groups in India. It will also help bring world class innovation to the financial sector. RBIH is to help in convergence among various stakeholders from BFSI sector, start-up ecosystem, regulators and academia in the financial innovation space. RBIH is working on the blueprint of Digital Rupee. Through the LF Decentralized Trust, the RBI is utilizing Linux Foundation's projects to build the Digital Rupee.

== International collaboration ==
=== Project Nexus ===
The Bank for International Settlements (BIS) signed an agreement with Central Bank of Malaysia, Bank of Thailand, Bangko Sentral ng Pilipinas, Monetary Authority of Singapore, and the Reserve Bank of India on 30 June 2024 as founding member of Project Nexus, a multilateral international initiative to enable retail cross-border payments. Bank Indonesia involved as a special observer. The platform, which is expected to go live by 2026, will interlink domestic fast payment systems of the member countries.

== In popular culture ==
- In the film Governor (2026), the RBI Governor was portrayed by Manoj Bajpayee as A. Ramanan, inspired by S. Venkitaramanan, the 18th Governor of the RBI.

== See also ==
- Inflation in India
- Financial risk management
- Risk management
- Consumer leverage ratio
- Core inflation
- Open market operation
- Dot-com bubble
- 2008 financial crisis
- Free banking
- Gold standard
- Government debt
- Digital rupee
- Cost-of-living index
- Wholesale price index
- Consumer price index
- Sovereign Gold Bond
- Outline of economics
- List of central banks
- List of financial supervisory authorities by country
- Exchange rate history of the Indian rupee
- Governor of the Reserve Bank of India
- Deputy Governor of the Reserve Bank of India
