= Security Printing and Minting Corporation of India =

Public Sector

Security Printing and Minting Corporation of India Ltd
- Type: Statutory body
- Industry: Government Documents; Government Security Products; Currency; Coins
- Founded: 10 February 2006; 20 years ago
- Headquarters: Jawahar Vyapar Bhawan, Janpath, New Delhi
- Area served: India
- Key people: CMD
- Products: Currency Notes; Bank Notes; Non-Judicial Stamp Papers; Security Products; Circulation & Commemorative Coins; Security Ink
- Revenue: ▲₹4,714.8 crore (US$490 million) (2023-24)
- Operating income: ▲₹1,384.84 crore (US$140 million) (2024)
- Net income: ▲₹911.04 crore (US$95 million) (2024)
- Total assets: ▲₹9,639.90 crore (US$1.0 billion) (2024)
- Owner: Ministry of Finance, Government of India
- Number of employees: 5,752 (2024)
- Subsidiaries: Bank Note Paper Mill India
- Website: spmcil.com

The Security Printing & Minting Corporation of India Ltd. (SPMCIL) is an organization under the Coin and Currency Division of the Department of Economic Affairs, Ministry of Finance. It is responsible for conducting printing and minting activities for the Government of India. It is under the ownership of the Ministry of Finance, Government of India. It was incorporated on 13 January 2006 with its registered office at New Delhi. It is engaged in the manufacture / production of currency and banknotes, security paper, non-judicial stamp papers, postage stamps and stationery, travel document viz., passport and visa, security certificates, cheques, bonds, warrants, special certificates with security features, security inks, circulation and commemorative coins, medallions, refining of gold, silver and assay of precious metals, etc.

The corporation was formed in 2006 due to the consolidation and corporatization of currency presses, security presses, paper mills, and mints functioning under the Ministry of Finance. It contains nine units, four mints, four presses, and a paper mill.

== History ==
The corporation was incorporated by taking over two security presses at Nashik and Hyderabad, two currency note presses at Dewas and Nashik, four mints at Mumbai, Kolkata, Hyderabad and Noida and one security paper mill at Narmadapuram which were working under the direct administrative control of the Ministry of Finance and the Department of Economic Affairs. In its third report dated 23 December 2000, the Expenditure Reforms Commission gave nine recommendations concerning mints and presses and suggested exploring the option of placing India Security Press, Nashik, and four India Government Mints under a corporate body. The commission also recommended that the government explore the feasibility of the Department of Posts taking over the Security Printing Press at Hyderabad. The Commission further recommended for the two currency note presses at Dewas and Nashik to be transferred to the control of Bharatiya Reserve Bank Note Mundran Private Limited, setting up of a new security paper mill by the Reserve Bank of India (RBI) and phasing out or privatization of Security Paper Mill, Narmadapuram.

Neither the RBI nor the Department of Posts agreed to take over the security presses as per the recommendations of the Expenditure Reforms Commission. The feasibility of hiving off the security paper mill at Hoshangabad could not fructify due to operational and logistic constraints. On subsequent review of functions and performance of the Units, it was realized that the main constraints in the existing system of keeping these units as government entities were low productivity, obsolete technology, outdated financial systems and procedures, and delays in responding technologically to the challenges of counterfeiting. All these factors, in combination, resulted in inefficient capacity utilization and a consequential higher cost of production.

=== Corporatisation ===
Industrial Finance Corporation of India (IFCI) Limited was appointed as a consultant to study the working of the nine units and present a feasibility report for their corporatization. Accordingly, it was decided to form a wholly owned corporation by taking over all nine security presses/mints/security paper mills. The Union Cabinet, in its meeting held on 2 September 2005, approved the formation of a wholly owned corporation, namely, the Security Printing and Minting Corporation of India Limited (SPMCIL). The corporation was incorporated under the Companies Act on 13 January 2006.

== Organisation structure ==
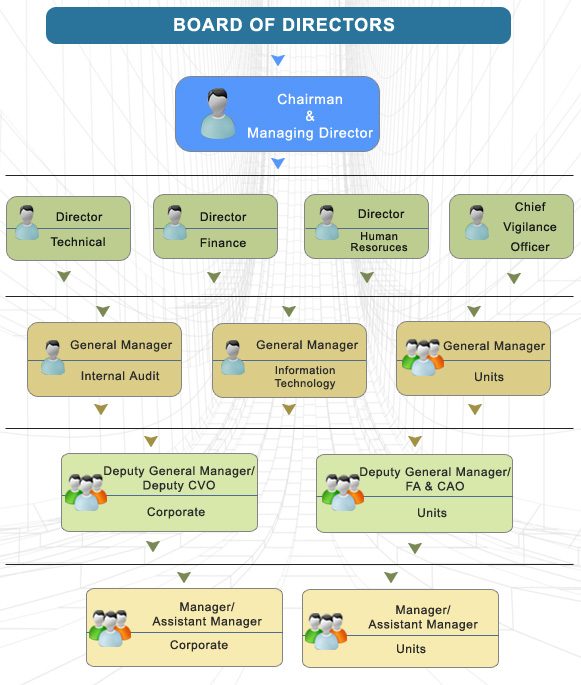
Corporate Structure of SPMCIL

SPMCIL is headed by a board of directors, presided over by the Chairman and Managing Director. The other board members include three functional directors who head the technical, finance, and human resources departments. Apart from the four functional directors, three directors are Government nominee directors, and the end-user representatives, consisting of Reserve Bank of India, Ministry of External Affairs, and Department of Post, each one of them has one nominee as Director. Additionally, two independent directors are nominated by the Ministry of Finance. The board also commissions a Chief Vigilance Officer (CVO) who heads the organization's internal vigilance department. Each unit of SPMCIL is headed by a Chief General Manager/General Manager HOD who functions under the control and direction of the Head office.

=== Human Resource ===
The Human Resource Department handles administration, establishment, legal, official language, training, personnel, and industrial relations.

=== Finance and Accounts ===
The finance department handles accounts, taxation, internal audits, costing, budgeting, capital investments, corporate finance, coordination with auditors, the company secretariat, etc.

== Units ==
SPMCIL broadly operates through four production verticals, i.e., currency printing presses, security printing presses, security paper mill, and the Indian Government mints.

=== Currency printing presses ===
SPMCIL consists of two currency printing presses: the Currency Note Press (CNP) in Nashik and the Bank Note Press (BNP) in Dewas. New production lines are also set up in Mysore and Salboni. The two units are engaged in the production of banknotes for India as well as a few foreign countries, including Iraq, Nepal, Sri Lanka, Myanmar, and Bhutan. More than 40% of Currency Notes circulated in India are printed by the two units. These units are equipped with designing, engraving, complete Pre-printing and Offset facilities, Intaglio Printing machines, Numbering & Finishing machines, etc.

Currency is also printed by the two presses of Bharatiya Reserve Bank Note Mudran Private Limited, a wholly owned subsidiary of Reserve Bank of India. BNP also has an ink factory that produces ink for security printing in Dewas Bank Note Press (BNP) unit.

=== Security printing presses ===
There are two Security printing presses of SPMCIL, namely the India Security Press (ISP) at Nashik and the Security Printing Press (SPP) at Hyderabad. These presses print the 100% requirement of passports and other travel documents, non-judicial stamp papers, cheques, bonds, warrants, postal stamps, postal stationery, and other security products. The Security Printing Presses have the capability of incorporating security features like chemically reactive elements, various Guilloche patterns, micro lettering, designs with UV inks, bi-fluorescent inks, optical variable inks, micro-perforation, adhesive/glue, embossing, die-cutting, and personalization, etc.

=== Mints ===
SPMCIL comprises four units of India Government Mint located in the cities of Mumbai, Kolkata, Hyderabad, and Noida. These mints produce circulation coins, commemorative coins, medallions and bullion, as required by the Government of India.

=== Paper mill ===
Security Paper Mill was established in 1968 at Narmadapuram, Madhya Pradesh. It produces papers for banknotes, non–judicial stamps, and passport paper.
