= India Security Press =

Government printing press

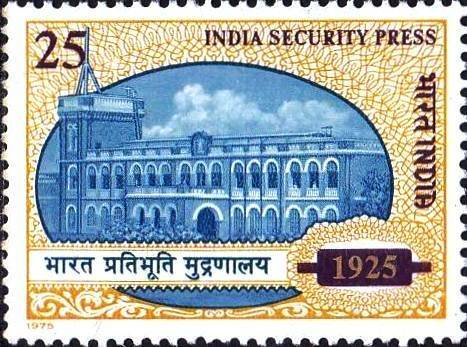
Stamp of India - 1975 on the occasion of 50th Anniviversary of India Security Press depicting India Security Press Building.

The India Security Press is a government press is a subsidiary of the Security Printing & Minting Corporation of India Limited (SPMCIL), a public undertaking of the Indian government. The company is charged with the task of printing passports, visas, postage stamps, post cards, inland letters, envelopes, non-postal adhesives, court fees, fiscal, and Hundi stamps in the country.

The press is located near Nashik city in Maharashtra state of India.
