= Cluster Innovation Centre =

Constituent Center of Delhi University

Cluster Innovation Centre, University of Delhi (DU CIC)
- Motto in English: Evolving Senses, Dissolving Boundaries
- Type: Public
- Established: 2011
- Founder: Prof. Dinesh Singh
- Parent institution: University of Delhi
- Accreditation: UGC
- Endowment: ₹18 crores (2022-23)
- Director: Shobha Bagai
- Faculty: 20+
- Undergraduates: 350+
- Postgraduates: 40+
- Doctoral students: 15+
- Location: North Campus, Delhi University, Delhi; 28°41′27.5274″N 77°12′51.1054″E
- Campus: 67 acres (27 ha); Urban
- Acronym: DU CIC
- Website: cic.du.ac.in

The Cluster Innovation Centre (DU CIC) pronounced [sɐ̃kʊlɐ nɐʋɐpɾɐʋɐɾt̪ɐnɐ kẽd̪ɾɐ] is a Government of India-funded center established under the aegis of the University of Delhi. It was founded in 2011 by Prof. Dinesh Singh, the then Vice Chancellor of the University of Delhi, and introduced Innovation as a credit-based course for the first time in India.

== Establishment ==
The Cluster Innovation Centre was conceptualized to foster innovation and connect academic research with practical applications. It was established during the tenure of Prof. Dinesh Singh, then Vice Chancellor of the University of Delhi. The National Innovation Council proposed the development of 20 University Innovation Centres across the country, with CIC serving as the prototype for this initiative.

== Objectives ==
CIC aims to develop a culture of innovation within the academic system and to connect research with societal needs. Its primary objectives include promoting innovative degree programs, educating students and faculty through innovation-focused schemes, supporting application-oriented research, and facilitating collaborations with industries, academia, and other stakeholders. It also focuses on commercializing innovations to make them accessible to end users, addressing real-world problems through student projects, and developing affordable and sustainable innovations that benefit a broad audience.

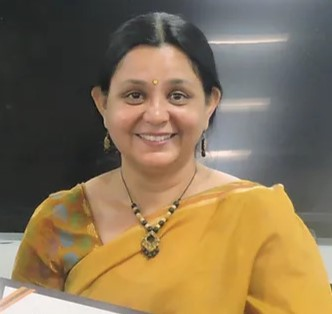
Prof. Shobha Bagai, Director, CIC

== Academic Programs ==
CIC offers interdisciplinary academic programs spanning undergraduate, postgraduate, and doctoral levels.

=== Undergraduate Programs ===
The Bachelor of Technology (B.Tech.) in Information Technology and Mathematical Innovations is a four-year program that integrates mathematics and information technology to cultivate an innovation-driven mindset. Students in this program can earn a minor degree in fields such as electronics, management, or computational biology.

The Bachelor of Arts (Honours) in Humanities and Social Sciences, offered under the "Meta College" concept, is another four-year interdisciplinary program. It enables students to design their degree by majoring in fields like environmental science, tourism, geography, literature, media and communication studies, natural sciences, or psychology. This program encourages projects addressing societal issues, often in collaboration with organizations like the Delhi Jal Board, Delhi Police, National Association of the Deaf, and other non-governmental organizations.

=== Postgraduate Program ===
The Master of Science (M.Sc) in Mathematics Education is a two-year program jointly offered by the University of Delhi and Jamia Millia Islamia. This program aims to innovate mathematics pedagogy by integrating interdisciplinary methods, such as storytelling, projects, and participatory learning, with a focus on using technology to enhance education.

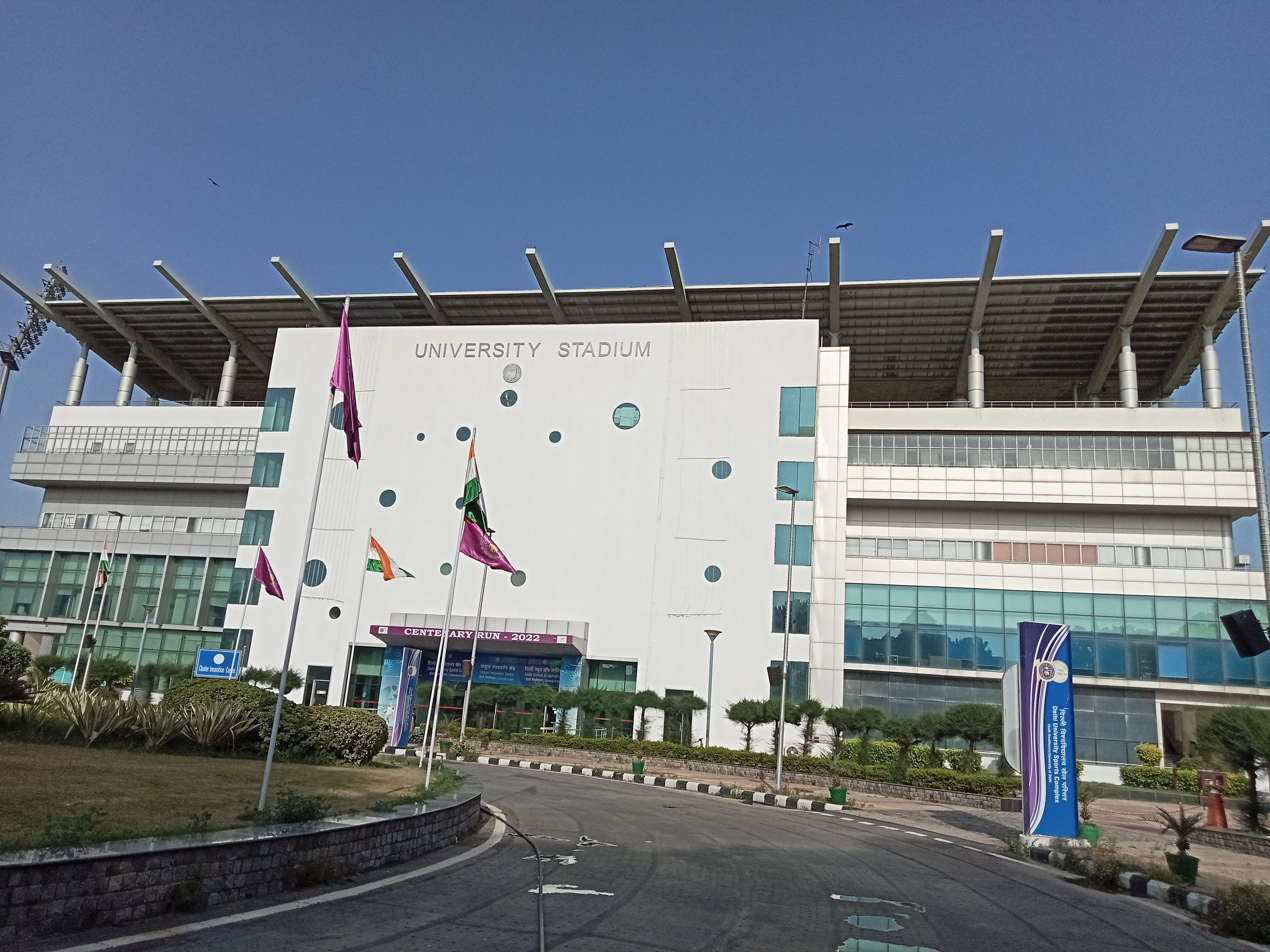
The academic building of the Cluster Innovation Centre pictured on an autumn afternoon

=== Doctoral Research ===
CIC offers Ph.D. Programs under the Faculty of Technology with an interdisciplinary approach. Research areas include mathematics, information technology, computer science, physics, computational biology, nanotechnology, environmental sciences, humanities and social sciences, media and communication studies, and psychology.

== Admissions ==
Before 2022, Delhi University conducted a Delhi University Entrance Test (DUET) for admission into the Cluster Innovation Centre.

In the present day, admissions to CIC’s programs are conducted through the Common University Entrance Test (CUET) for undergraduate and postgraduate courses. Ph.D. admissions are based on the National Eligibility Test (NET) scores conducted by the National Testing Agency (NTA).

== Campus ==
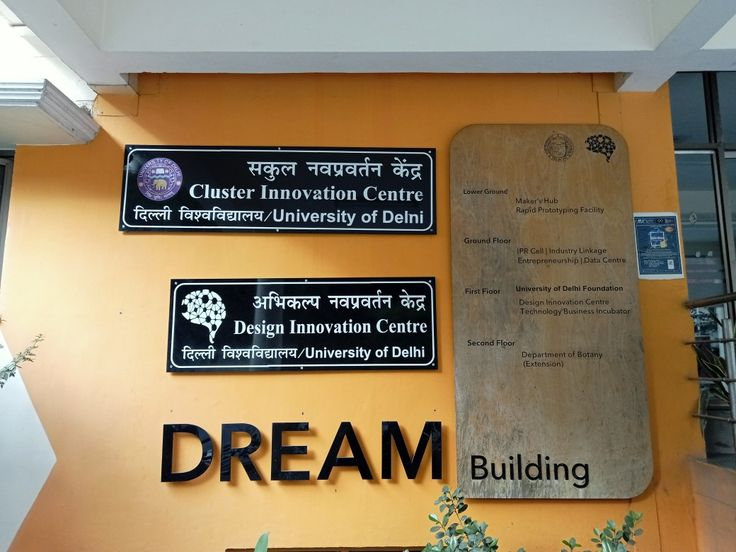
DREAM Building, University of Delhi, which hosts the Design Innovation Centre

The Cluster Innovation Centre is currently located inside the University Stadium building of the University of Delhi. This stadium is located inside the Delhi University Sports Complex, that in-turn is adjoint to the Viceregal Lodge (Vice Chancellor's Office) and Faculty of Science of the University's North Campus. The campus area of this block is 67 acres (27 ha). The campus is connected to the Delhi Metro through Vishwavidyalaya metro station of Yellow Line.

=== Design Innovation Centre (DIC) ===
CIC administers a Design Innovation Centre (DIC), established under the Ministry of MSME. DIC operates within the framework proposed by the National Innovation Council, which envisioned the establishment of similar design innovation centres in prominent educational institutions like IIT Delhi, IIT Bombay, IIT Guwahati, and IISc Bangalore. These centres operate on a "Hub and Spoke" model, promoting collaboration among academia, industry, and society to develop impactful innovations. The centre includes facilities such as a Technology Business Incubator, which provides lab access, workshops, and mentorship to startups in a PPP model.

The DIC operates within the framework proposed by the National Innovation Council, which envisioned the establishment of similar design innovation centres in prominent educational institutions like IIT Delhi, IIT Bombay, IIT Guwahati, and IISc Bangalore. These centres, following a 'Hub and Spoke' model, are designed to bring together academia, industry, and society to identify and develop impactful innovations.
