= Dinesh Singh (academic) =

Indian academic

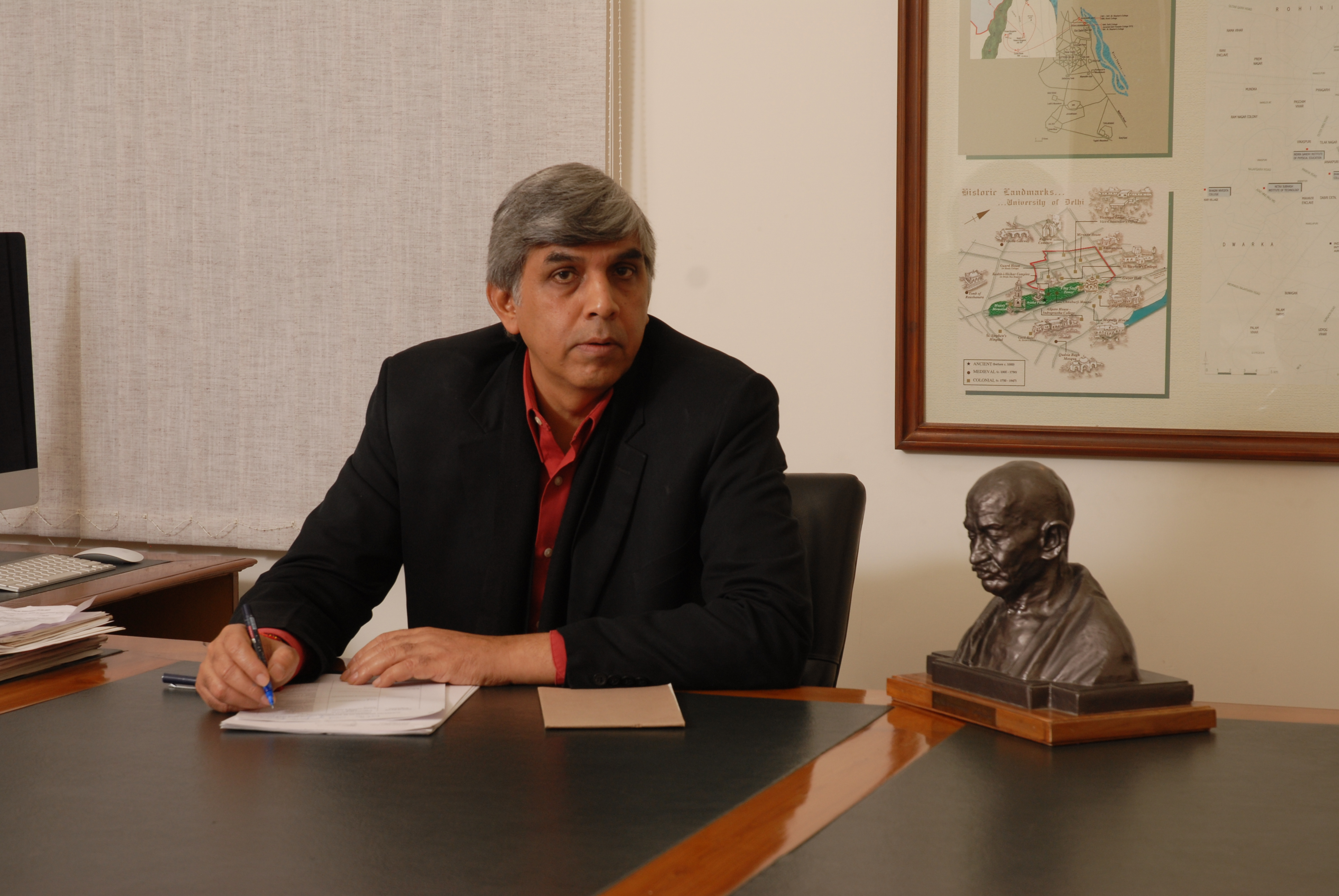

Vice-Chancellor of the University of Delhi
- In office 29 October 2010 – 2015
- Preceded by: Deepak Pantal
- Succeeded by: Yogesh Kumar Tyagi

Personal details
- Education: St. Stephen's College; Imperial College London
- Awards: Padma Shri (2014)

Professor Dinesh Singh, chancellor K.R. Mangalam University is an Indian professor of mathematics. He served as the 21st Vice-Chancellor of the University of Delhi, is a distinguished fellow of Hackspace at Imperial College London, and has been an adjunct professor of Mathematics at the University of Houston. For his services to the nation he was conferred with the Padma Shri which is the fourth highest civilian award awarded by the Republic of India.

== Early life and background ==
Singh was born to Professor Udita Narayana Singh, former vice-chancellor of the University of Allahabad and pro vice-chancellor of the University of Delhi.

Singh earned his B.Sc. Hons (Maths) in 1975 and M.A. (Maths) in 1977 from St. Stephen's College, followed by M.Phil (Maths) in 1978 from the University of Delhi. He did a PhD in Math from Imperial College London in 1981. He holds numerous honorary doctorates some of them being awarded by University of Edinburgh, National Institute of Technology, Kurukshetra, University College Cork, Ireland, and University of Houston.

== Career ==
Singh started his career as lecturer at St. Stephen's College, University of Delhi, in 1981. Thereafter he joined the Department of Mathematics, University of Delhi, in 1987. He was head of the Department of Mathematics at the University of Delhi from December 2004 to September 2005. He served the University of Delhi as a director, South Campus from 2005-2010. He officiated briefly as pro vice chancellor, University of Delhi, before being appointed vice chancellor on 29 October 2010. His area of specialization includes functional analysis, operator theory, and harmonic analysis. He is an adjunct professor at the University of Houston and has also taught at the Indian Institute of Technology Delhi, Indian Statistical Institute, Delhi. He is a recipient of Padma Shri, the fourth highest civilian honour awarded by the Republic of India. He is noted for being instrumental in setting up of Cluster Innovation Centre at University of Delhi, an inter-disciplinary, first of its kind research center particularly promoting undergraduate research. He also popularized the concept of innovation as credit.

== Awards and distinctions ==
- Padma Shri – India's fourth highest civilian award by the President of India "in recognition of distinguished service in the field of Literature and Education", 2014
- Career Award in Mathematics of the University Grants Commission, 1994.
- The AMU Prize of the Indian Mathematical Society, 1989.
- The Inlaks Scholarship to pursue the Ph.D. degree at the Imperial College, 1978.
- Mukarji-Ram Behari Mathematics Prize of St. Stephen’s College for the Best Pass in M.A., 1977.
- Best Undergraduate in Mathematics prize of St. Stephen’s College, 1974.
- Member, Scientific Advisory Committee to the Union Cabinet, Govt. of India
- Member, Jnanpith Award Jury Selection Board-one of the highest literary prizes in India
- Elected President, Mathematical Sciences Section, Indian Science Congress Association, 2012-13
- Elected Vice President, Ramanujan Mathematical Society, 2013-15

== Controversies ==
Singh's tenure was marked by frequent friction with the Democratic Teachers' Front (DTF) controlled Delhi University Teachers Association (DUTA). Critics, including DUTA leadership and college principals, described his administration as "feudal" and "autocratic," citing a lack of consultation in decision-making.

DUTA released a 'White Paper' alleging financial irregularities, specifically regarding the diversion of funds intended for OBC students for purchase of laptops or flagging off 'Gyanodaya Express’. The Ministry of Human Resource Development (MHRD) issued a show-cause notice regarding these charges, which Singh contested. While the government ultimately decided not to process his reply due to his tenure ending, the MHRD later attempted to place Singh on "forced leave" weeks before his term expired. The Visitor (President Pranab Mukherjee) reportedly intervened to stop the forced leave but directed Singh not to continue beyond his term.

Conversely, a group of prominent academics, including former heads of the CSIR and Indian National Science Academy and academics from JNU, Jamia, BHU and former DU vice chancellors, publicly backed Singh, arguing that the government's interference compromised the university's autonomy.

Singh was the primary architect of the controversial Four Year Undergraduate Programme (FYUP). The reform faced severe opposition from students and teachers and was ultimately scrapped by the University Grants Commission (UGC) in 2014. Singh briefly resigned following the rollback but later retracted his resignation.
