= List of vice-chancellors of the University of Delhi =

The vice-chancellor of the executive head of the University of Delhi. The current Vice-Chancellor of University of Delhi is Yogesh Singh as per 2026. The vice-chancellors of DU are as follows.

Chronological List of Vice Chancellors of University of Delhi
No.	Picture	Name	Term of Office
1		Hari Singh Gaur	1922-26
2		Moti Sagar	1926-30
3		Sir Abdur Rahman	1930-34
4		Ram Kishor	1934-38
5		Maurice Gwyer	1938-50
6		S.N. Sen	1950-53
7		G. S. Mahajan	1953-57
8		V.K.R.V. Rao	1957-60
9		N.K. Sidhant	1960-61
10		C. D. Deshmukh	1962-67
11		B. N. Ganguly	1967-69
12		K. N. Raj	1969-70
13		Sarup Singh	1971-74
14		R.C. Mehrotra	1974-79
15		U. N. Singh	1979-80
16		Gurbakhsh Singh	1980-85
17		Moonis Raza	1985-90
18		Upendra Baxi	1990-94
19		V.R. Mehta	1995-2000
20		Deepak Nayyar	2000-2005
21		Deepak Pantal	2005-2010
22		Dinesh Singh	2010-2015
23		Yogesh Kumar Tyagi	2016-2020
23		Yogesh Singh	2021-present

== See also ==
University of Delhi
