= Techspardha =

Techspardha, NIT Kurukshetra
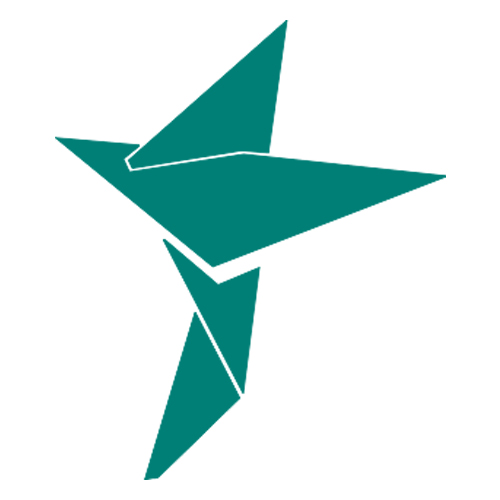
- Techspardha
- Genre: Techno-management festival
- Venue: National Institute of Technology, Kurukshetra
- Locations: Kurukshetra, India
- Coordinates: 29°56′57.3″N 76°48′57.0″E
- Founded: 1995
- Organiser: Student community of NIT Kurukshetra
- Filing status: Non-Profit Student Organisation
- Sponsor: NIT Kurukshetra
- Prize money: ₹5,00,000
- Website: www.techspardha.org

Techspardha is the annual techno-managerial festival of National Institute of Technology, Kurukshetra. It started in 1995 as "Technospect" (later changed to Literati). The year 2013 marked the Golden Jubilee of NIT Kurukshetra, thus it was renamed as Techspardha. Etymologically, the word 'Techspardha' is composed of two words: 'Tech' in English (as a contraction of technology) and 'Spardha' in Hindi (meaning competition). Techspardha hosts a variety of events that include competitions, exhibitions, guest lectures as well as workshops.

== Events & Activities ==
Students are provided with an opportunity to showcase their skills and talents in a wide spectrum of events which test not only the technical know-how, but also managerial and soft skills. The events are aimed to encourage students to come out of textbooks and apply their knowledge in a real-life setup.

=== Managerial events ===
In Wars of Entrepreneurs, teams of 4 compete in this fierce battle to emerge as the ultimate marketing maestros. The Participants are judged on the basis of uniqueness of idea, financial assessment of proposal and presentation skills.
Alphaquest involves publicity of a product in various ways.

=== Technical events ===
Robowars is a game of style, control, damage and aggression with the robots pit against each other in a deadly combat. The last robot standing in this elimination based event takes away the prize.
Vidhwaan asks the participants to present the power system design of India. It provides a deep understanding of the concepts of power systems to the participants.
Excalibur is a software product development competition where the participants are required to pick up a daily life problem and present its solution through software.
Build Em All is a design event in which participant have to design any structure as per the problem statement with the help of pop sticks, glue and threads.
Productathon is a hardware/software product development competition to accomplish the major ongoing problems in this world and to enhance the recent advancement in the world of technology.

=== Paper presentations ===
Electrovista and Microsearch asks participants to research and present any upcoming idea/innovation in the fields of Electrical and Electronics. It gives a chance to enhance their knowledge as well as presentation skills.
In Technova, participants are encouraged to research and present any upcoming idea/innovation/algorithm in the field of Computers.
Civiera is a paper presentation event on the theme basis like Resource Optimization, Productivity Maximization etc.

=== Quiz events ===
Brainstorm is a general trivia quiz for polymaths on a wide range of topics like sports, food, politics, inventions, world events etc.
Mastishk is known to be the toughest aptitude test series of Techspardha. Several rounds of mind wobbling quizzes and puzzles are held to decide the winner. CV Quiz

=== Others ===
Mr. Aristotle is an event which tests the managerial skills of the participants. Several grueling rounds like aptitude testing, group discussion, personal interview are conducted to unearth the next Aristotle.
Junkyard Wars caters to all those ranchos who have a penchant for breaking up stuff and reassembling it into something awesome just with random junk.
Roll-a-coster asks the students to design a groovy and innovative ride for a ½" inch metal ball, consisting of loops, turns and spirals, similar to an actual roller coaster.
Contraption tests your mechanical ingenuity and creative skills, requires participants to implement a series of mind boggling energy conversations with routine stuff.
Micrologic where in teams have to present a microcontroller based working model on any innovative and novel idea. The teams will be judged on the basis of peripherals of microcontroller used, uniqueness of idea and usefulness.
Big Fight is the event for those who know how to fight with words, provides an opportunity to all the debaters to come forward and assert their views on a wide spectrum of topics.
E-Modeling is an event to test the aptitude of participants in the field of digital circuits. This fiercely competitive event has a history of its winners going on to become very successful in the field of electronics.

=== Exhibitions ===
Exhibitions provide an ideal platform to reduce the gap between the technology in today’s world and the common man in India. Every year Exhibition has mesmerized people by presenting technological avant-garde in the world. It helps young minds to broaden their vision and to update their tech know-how.

=== Guest Lectures ===
Lectures is one of the most distinguished parts of the fest. The series has been continuously striving to impart knowledge and profound experience to one of the largest gathering across the continent. The sheer volume of knowledge and ideas that are spread through the series is immense and unimaginable. The platform provides the opportunity of interacting with eminent personalities and share ideas and interests.
