= All India Council for Technical Education =

Indian statutory body

- Abbreviation: AICTE
- Formation: November 1945; 81 years ago
- Headquarters: New Delhi
- Location: Thiruvananthapuram, Kolkata, Chennai, Kanpur, Mumbai, Vadodara, Chandigarh, Guwahati, Bhopal, Bengaluru, Hyderabad, Gurugram
- Chairman: Yogesh Singh (additional charge)
- Main organ: Council
- Affiliations: Department of Higher Education, Ministry of Education
- Budget: ₹420 crore (US$45 million) (FY2022–23 est.)
- Website: www.aicte-india.org

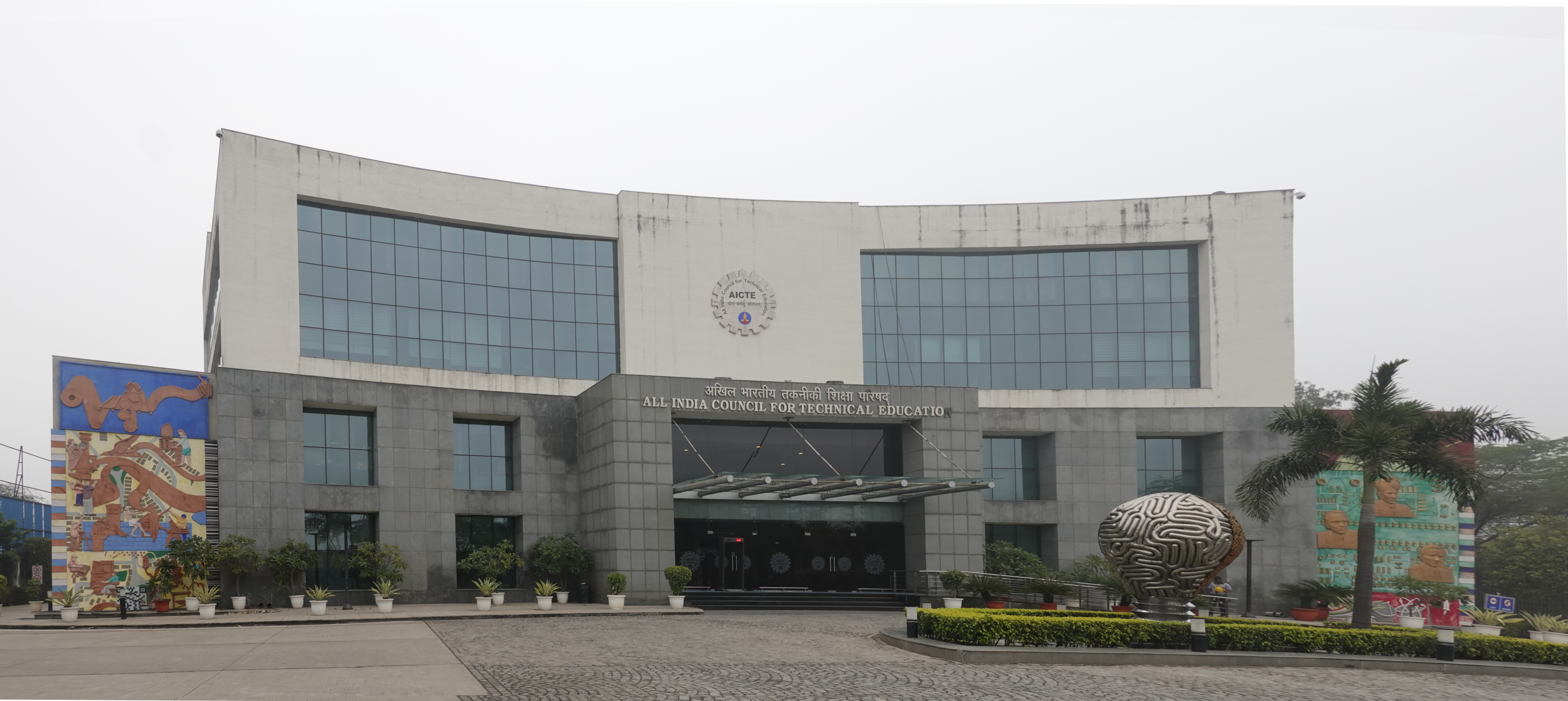
AICTE Headquarters, New Delhi

The All India Council for Technical Education (AICTE) is a statutory national-level council for technical education, under the Department of Higher Education. Established in November 1945 first as an advisory body, which was given statutory status by an Act of Parliament in 1987, the AICTE is responsible for proper planning and coordinated development of the graduate and postgraduate education in technical education and management education system in India.

It is assisted by 10 Statutory Boards of Studies, namely, UG Studies in Eng. & Tech., PG and Research in Eng. and Tech., Management Studies, Vocational Education, Technical Education, Pharmaceutical Education, Architecture, Hotel Management and Catering Technology, Information Technology, Town and Country Planning. The AICTE has its new headquarters building in Delhi on the Nelson Mandela Road, Vasant Kunj, New Delhi, 110067, which has the offices of the chairman, vice-chairman and member secretary. The AICTE has regional offices at Kanpur, Chandigarh, Gurugram, Mumbai, Bhopal, Vadodara, Kolkata, Guwahati, Bengaluru, Hyderabad, Chennai and Thiruvananthapuram.

In its 25 April 2013 judgment, the Supreme Court of India said "as per provisions of the AICTE Act and University Grants Commission (UGC) Act, the council has no authority which empowers it to issue or enforce any sanctions on colleges affiliated with the universities as its role is to provide only guidance and recommendations." Subsequently, the AICTE was getting approval from the Supreme Court to regulate technical colleges on a year to year basis till January 2016, when AICTE got blanket approval for publishing the Approval Process Handbook and approve technical colleges including management for the session 2016-17 and in all future sessions."

== Objectives ==
According to the All India Council for Technical Education, 1987, the AICTE is vested with statutory authority for planning, formulation and maintenance of norms and standards, quality assurance through school accreditation, funding in priority areas, monitoring and evaluation, maintaining parity of certification and awards and ensuring coordinated and integrated development and management of technical education in the country. In the words of the Act itself:

To provide for establishment of an All India council for Technical Education with a view to the proper planning and co-ordinated development of the technical education system throughout the country, the promotion of qualitative improvement of such education in relation to planned quantitative growth and the regulation and proper maintenance of norms and standards in the technical education system and for matters connected therewith.

== AICTE bureaus ==
The AICTE is composed of the e-Governance, Approval, Planning and Coordination, Academic, University, Administration, Finance, and Research, Institutional and Faculty Development Bureaus. There are 10 additional Board Studies dealing with technician, vocational, undergraduate engineering, postgraduate engineering and research, architecture, town and country planning, pharmacy, management, applied arts and crafts, hotel management and catering technology education. For each bureau, adviser is the bureau head who is assisted by technical officers and other supporting staff. The multidiscipline technical officer and staff of the Council are on deputation (the tenure staff uses their addresses ending in aicteindia.co.in) or on contract from government departments, University Grants Commission, academic institutions, etc.

== Increase in approved institutions ==
Growth of Technical Institutions in the Country

Year	Engineering	Management	MCA	Pharmacy	Architecture	HMCT	Total
2006–07	1511	1132	1003	665	116	64	4491
2007–08	1668	1149	1017	854	116	81	4885
2008–09	2388	1523	1095	1021	116	87	6230
2009–10	2972	1940	1169	1081	106	93	7361
2010–11	3222	2262	1198	1114	108	100	8004
2011–12	3393	2385	1228	1137	116	102	8361
2012–13	3495	2450	1241	1145	126	105	8562
2013–14	3384	2450	1241	1031	105	81	8562
2014–15	3392	2450	1241	1025	114	77	8562
2015–16	3364	2450	1241	1027	117	77	8562
2016–17	3288	2450	1241	1034	115	74	

Growth of Seats in different Programs in Technical Institutions

Year	Engineering	Management	MCA	Pharmacy	Architecture	HMCT	Total
2005–06	499697	–	–	32708	4379	4435	541219
2006–07	550986	94704	56805	39517	4543	4242	750797
2007–08	653290	121867	70513	52334	4543	5275	907822
2008–09	841018	149555	73995	64211	4543	5794	1139116
2009–10	1071896	179561	78293	68537	4133	6387	1408807
2010–11	1314594	277811	87216	98746	4991	7393	1790751
2011–12	1485894	352571	92216	102746	5491	7693	2046611
2012–13	1761976	385008	100700	121652	5996	8401	2236743

== Reforms ==
In 2016, three important initiatives were taken up by AICTE. First one was a responsibility given by MHRD (former name of MOE) to evolve a national MOOCs platform SWAYAM. Second one is that of launching a Smart India Hackathon-2017 challenging the young bright talented students of technical colleges to solve the 598 problems of 29 different Government departments. Third one is that of launching of an AICTE's Student Start up Policy by Hon. President on 16 Nov, during visitors conference from rashtrapati Bhavan. In 2009, the Union Minister of Education formally communicated his intentions of closing down AICTE and related body, the University Grants Commission (UGC). This later led to reforms in the way the AICTE approves institutes, and to establishing the National Board of Accreditation (NBA) as an independent body.

On 6 June 2017, Prime Minister Narendra Modi announced that the AICTE along with the University Grants Commission would be scrapped and replaced by a new body called Higher Education Empowerment Regulation Agency (HEERA). The intent was to simplify the excessive regulations that exist due to both these bodies. According to the draft of law backed on the ideas of NITI Aayog and the Prime Minister Office, the National Council for Teacher Education was also planned to be subsumed by HEERA.

== See also ==
- Regional accreditation
- Education in India
- DOEACC
- Science and technology in India
- Indian Institute of Technology
