= C. D. Deshmukh =

Indian politician

Sir C. D. Deshmukh CIE ICS
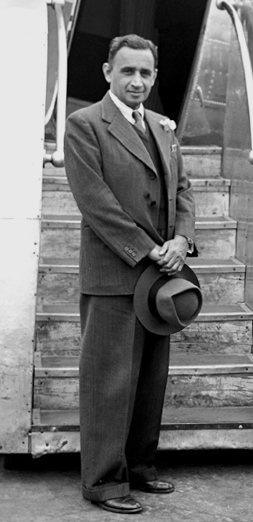
- Deshmukh at Palam Airport in 1952

10th Vice Chancellor of University of Delhi
- In office 1962 - 1967
- Preceded by: N.K. Sidhant
- Succeeded by: B.N. Ganguly

Chairman of University Grants Commission
- In office 1956 - 1961
- Preceded by: Pt. H.N. Kunzru
- Succeeded by: Dr. V.S. Krishna

4th Minister of Finance
- In office 29 May 1950- 24 July 1956
- Prime Minister: Jawaharlal Nehru
- Preceded by: John Mathai
- Succeeded by: T. T. Krishnamachari

Member of Parliament, Lok Sabha
- In office 1952 - 1957
- Preceded by: position established
- Succeeded by: Rajaram Balkrishna Raut
- Constituency: Kolaba

3rd Governor of Reserve Bank of India
- In office 11 August 1943 - 30 June 1949
- Preceded by: Sir James Braid Taylor
- Succeeded by: Sir Benegal Rama Rau

Personal details
- Born: 14 January 1896 Nate, Bombay Presidency, British India
- Died: 2 October 1982 (aged 86) Hyderabad, Andhra Pradesh (now Telangana), India
- Spouses: Rosina A. Wilcox (m. 1919; died 1949) Durgabai Gummidithala (m. 1953; died 1981)
- Children: 1 (daughter)
- Education: University of Cambridge
- Awards: Padma Vibushan (1975); Ramon Magsaysay Award (1959); Companion of the Order of the Indian Empire (1937)

Sir Chintaman Dwarakanath Deshmukh CIE ICS (14 January 1896 – 2 October 1982) was an Indian civil servant and the first Indian to be appointed the Governor of the Reserve Bank of India in 1943 by the British Raj authorities. He subsequently served as the Finance Minister in the Union Cabinet (1950–1956). It was during this time that he also became a founding member of the Governing Body of NCAER, the National Council of Applied Economic Research in New Delhi, India's first independent economic policy institute established in 1956 at the behest of Prime Minister Jawaharlal Nehru. After resignation from Union Cabinet he worked as Chairman of UGC (1956–1961). He served as Vice-Chancellor of University of Delhi (1962–67). He was also President of Indian Statistical Institute from 1945 to 1964, Honorary Chairman of National Book Trust (1957–60).

He founded India International Center in 1959 and served as Lifetime President of it. He was also chairman of Indian Institute of Public Administration.

== Early life and education ==
Chintaman Deshmukh was born to Dwarakanath Raje-Deshmukh, a lawyer and Bhagirathibai Raje-Deshmukh (née Sule-Mahagaonkar family) on 14 January 1896 in Nategaon, near Fort Raigad, Maharashtra in a Chandraseniya Kayastha Prabhu (CKP) family. He was schooled at Roha and Tala and at the Elphinstone High School, Bombay. In 1912, Deshmukh passed the Matriculation Examination of the University of Bombay with record marks and secured the first Jagannath Shankarseth Scholarship in Sanskrit. In 1915 he went to England and graduated with a degree in Natural Sciences Tripos from Jesus College, Cambridge in 1917. He was awarded the Frank Smart Prize in Botany and was also president of the Majlis Society. In 1918 he sat for, and stood first in the Indian Civil Service Examination, then held only in London.

== Civil service career ==
Deshmukh returned to India in 1920 and worked in the Central Provinces and Berar where he went on to hold several posts including as undersecretary to the government, Deputy Commissioner and Settlement Officer and as secretary to the Secretary-General at the Second Round Table Conference of 1931, later becoming secretary to the finance and public works department. He also served briefly as Joint Secretary to Government of India in the departments of education and health and was Custodian of Enemy Property.

== At the Reserve Bank of India ==
Deshmukh joined the Reserve Bank of India in 1939 and served successively as its Secretary to the Board, Deputy Governor and the Governor. He was appointed Governor of the Reserve Bank of India in August 1943 and is one of the eight Deputy Governors of the Bank who have gone on to become its Governor. As Governor, Deshmukh helped establish the Industrial Finance Corporation and focused on the promotion of rural credit. Deshmukh's tenure saw the RBI begin a Research and Statistics department, the demonetisation of bank notes of ₹ 500 and above, the ceasing of the RBI's role as the central banks of Burma and State Bank of Pakistan and the enactment of the Banking Companies Act, 1949 that laid down the framework for regulation of India's banking sector. The RBI was nationalised on 1 January 1949 through the RBI Act, 1948. Deshmukh opposed this proposal for nationalisation but agreed to continue as the chairman of the board of directors presiding over the transition of the bank from a private to a nationalised institution. In July 1949 Benegal Rama Rau succeeded Deshmukh as the Governor of the RBI.

== Bretton Woods Conference ==
Deshmukh was a member of a five-member delegation representing India at the Bretton Woods Conference that established the International Monetary Fund (IMF) and International Bank for Reconstruction and Development (IBRD). On the issue of quotas, Deshmukh suggested that India walk out of the conference since the original hierarchy would have excluded India from being automatically represented through an executive director at the IMF. The delegation also succeeded in bringing the issues of poverty and development into the agenda of the IBRD. It is said that John Maynard Keynes was so impressed by the "dignity, ability and reasonableness" of Deshmukh that he recommended Deshmukh head the IMF as its first managing director a suggestion that was however rejected by the United States.

He was a member of the Board of Governors of both of these institutions from 1946 to 1956. In 1950, he was elected Chairman of the Joint Annual Meeting of the Boards of Governors of these institutions at its Paris Conference.

== Deshmukh Award ==
Following Partition, the division of income tax revenue and jute export duty between the Union government and the states of India had to be decided based on the changed geographical realities. The Government of India appointed Deshmukh to resolve this matter pending the establishment of a Finance Commission. The Deshmukh Award, which was effected in 1950, factored in population in deciding the division of revenue and recommended grants in aid for various states and remained in force until April 1952.

== Union Finance Minister ==
Deshmukh was one of five members of the Planning Commission when it was constituted in 1950 by a cabinet resolution. Deshmukh succeeded John Mathai as the Union Finance Minister in 1950 after Mathai resigned in protest over the transfer of certain powers to the Planning Commission. As Finance Minister, Deshmukh continued to remain a member of the Planning Commission. His successors as Finance Minister were also made members of the Commission thus establishing a convention of the Finance Minister being an ex officio member of the Commission. Deshmukh's term as Finance Minister covered the period of the First Five Year Plan. He employed deficit financing as a key tool in bringing about planned investment but inflation and revenue deficits became major challenges during this period. Deshmukh was also chairman of a panel of economists that recommended the proposed Second Five Year Plan with its capital intensive model of development. He envisioned a significant role for the village and cottage industries in curbing unemployment and inflation caused by deficit financing and got the Congress Working Committee to approve the draft plan.

Deshmukh's first budget of 1951-52 proposed an overall rise in taxes. The following year he presented an interim budget for 1952-53 and a full budget in the first elected Parliament of India to which he was elected from the Kolaba constituency of Bombay State. In 1952 Deshmukh invited Paul Appleby to study Indian administration and Appleby's reports led to the establishment of the Organisation and Management Organisation in the Government of India and the establishment of the Indian Institute of Public Administration of which Deshmukh later became vice president and chairman. In 1955, the State Bank of India was formed through the nationalisation and amalgamation of the Imperial Bank with several smaller banks. This was undertaken on the recommendation of the All-India Rural Credit Survey Committee although Deshmukh had been opposed to plans for nationalising the bank when he was the RBI Governor. The nationalisation of insurance companies and the formation of the Life Insurance Corporation of India was accomplished by him through the Life Insurance Corporation of India Act, 1956. He resigned over the proposal of the Government of India to move a bill in Parliament bifurcating Bombay State into Gujarat and Maharashtra while designating the City of Bombay a Union Territory. Deshmukh's tenure - during which he delivered six budgets and an interim budget - is noted for the effective management of the Indian economy and its steady growth which saw the economy recover from the impacts of the events of the 1940s.

== Later career ==
Shortly after his resignation from the Cabinet, Deshmukh was appointed Chairman of India's University Grants Commission in 1956, a post he held until 1961. Deshmukh, who was the first chairman of the commission after it became a statutory body, played a key role in the development of university libraries during his tenure. He was also the founding chairman of the National Book Trust which was inaugurated in 1957 with the aim of making available books priced moderately to the general public and libraries. From 1962 - 1967, Deshmukh served as the tenth Vice Chancellor of the University of Delhi. He invited the Ford Foundation to survey and finance the upgradation of the Delhi University Library through a grant of US$ 1 million.

Deshmukh contested the Indian presidential election of 1969 as a candidate of the Swatantra Party and the Jana Sangh and won the third-highest number of first preference votes.

== Personal life ==
Deshmukh married Rosina Arthur Wilcox in 1920 with whom he had a daughter, Primrose. After Rosina's death in 1949, Deshmukh married Durgabai in 1953 and they were married until her death in 1981. Chintaman and I is her memoir published in 1980.

In 1974, he published his autobiography The Course of My Life.

Deshmukh died in Hyderabad on 2 October 1982.

== Awards ==
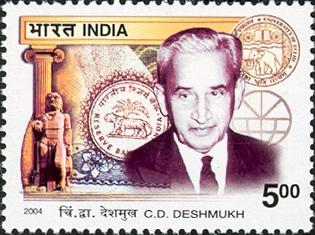
Deshmukh on a 2004 stamp of India

Deshmukh was appointed a Companion of the Order of the Indian Empire in 1937, and conferred a knighthood in 1944.

He was awarded an honorary Doctor of Science by the University of Calcutta in 1957 and an honorary Doctor of Literature by the Panjab University in 1959.

In 1959, Deshmukh was a co-recipient (along with Jose Aguilar of the Philippines) of the Ramon Magsaysay Award for distinguished Government Service. Jesus College, Cambridge, Deshmukh's alma mater, elected him its Honorary Fellow in 1952 in recognition of his distinguished contribution in the areas of Indian and international finance and administration.

In 1975, Sir Chintaman and Durgabai Deshmukh were awarded the Padma Vibhushan.

== Legacy ==
The Reserve Bank of India organises the annual lecture series called 'Chintaman Deshmukh Memorial Lectures', since 1984. The National Council of Applied Economic Research also conducts the annual C.D. Deshmukh Memorial Lecture since 2013.

The Thane Municipal Corporation established the Chintamanrao Deshmukh Institute for Administrative Careers in 1987, to prepare the youth to enter the civil services. A road in the Tilakwadi area of the city of Belgaum has been named as 'C. D. Deshmukh Road'. The India International Centre in New Delhi has an auditorium named after Deshmukh.

In 2004, a commemorative postage stamp was released in his honour.

The National Insurance Academy organises the annual seminar called "CD Deshmukh Memorial Seminar" since the last 22 years.
