= Shyamala Gopinath =

Indian banker

Chairperson of HDFC Bank
- In office 2 January 2015 – 2 July 2021
- Preceded by: C.M. Vasudev
- Succeeded by: Atanu Chakraborty

Deputy Governor of Reserve Bank of India
- In office 21 September 2004 – 20 June 2011
- Governor: Y. V. Reddy; Duvvuri Subbarao
- Preceded by: Vepa Kamesam
- Succeeded by: Harun Rashid Khan

Personal details
- Born: 20 June 1949 (age 77) India
- Education: (MCom) University of Mysore

Shyamala Gopinath (born 20 June 1949) is an Indian banker and former chairperson of HDFC Bank. She previously served as a deputy governor of the Reserve Bank of India (RBI), for seven years.

She was actively involved in managing India's balance of payments crisis in 1991 that led to the first round of economic liberalization. Making the returns of small saving schemes market-linked was one of the most significant recommendations made by the Shyamala Gopinath panel, constituted on 8 July 2010. Finally, the Government of India in February 2016 notified that instead of annual resetting of interest rates for the next financial year, the interest rates from now on will be reset every quarter based on the G-Sec yields of the previous quarter. She had earlier assisted the second Narasimhan committee on banking sector reforms.

A Certified Associate of the Indian Institute of Banking and Finance (1974), she has completed master's degree in commerce from University of Mysore (1980).

Shyamala Gopinath was honored 'Lifetime Achievement Award' at the ETPrime Women Leadership Awards in 2023.

== Early life ==
During her school days, Shyamala Gopinath wanted to study Mathematics and become a Teacher. However, her ambitions changed after selecting Commerce stream. Incidentally, she had opted Commerce as a subject to avoid studying History. She was among the few women students to post-graduate in Commerce from University of Mysore in 1970. After her post-graduate degree, she had decided on a career in Commercial Banking and joined Bank of Baroda but at her father's insistence, she appeared for RBI competitive examination and even topped it.

== Career in RBI ==
Shyamala Gopinath joined the RBI as an officer in April 1972. During 1972-1996, she rose through the ranks to become Chief General Manager in 1996, a position she held until 2001. Starting June 2001, she was on deputation as Senior Financial Expert at IMF where she worked in the then Monetary Affairs and Exchange Department - Financial Institutions Division. She was responsible for the Accompanying Document to the Guidelines on Foreign exchange reserve management detailing country practices. During July 2003 to September 2004, as Executive Director of RBI, she was responsible for the Bank Regulation and Supervision department till February 2004, among others. She was elevated to the position of Deputy Governor in September 2004. During her tenure, she was involved in reforms in forex regulations and market development. She served in this position until June 2011 during which she handled various areas ranging from financial stability, debt management, and foreign exchange reserves management, to management of capital account, financial market regulation, supervision of non-banking finance companies, payments and settlements systems, RBI accounts and the RBI balance sheet.

== Legacy ==
Gopinath was known to be a low profile and compassionate Deputy Governor of the RBI. Liquidity management and regulation was her forte and is known to have handled crises including the Kargil conflict of 1999, managing liquidity during the India Millennium Bond redemption in 2000, and the bankruptcy of Lehman brothers in 2008.

== Role as HDFC Bank Chairperson ==
With effect from 2 January 2015, Shyamala Gopinath assumed charge as part-time Non-Executive Chairperson of HDFC Bank for a period of 3 years. She is a member of Audit Committee (Chairperson), Nomination and Remuneration Committee, Risk Policy and Monitoring Committee, Customer Service Committee (Chairperson) and Fraud Monitoring Committee (Chairperson) at the bank.

== Other Important positions ==
- She served on the Boards of State Bank of India Exim bank and National Housing Bank as nominee of Reserve Bank of India during her stint as Deputy Governor, RBI.
- She is Chairperson of the Corporate Bonds and Securitization Advisory Committee of SEBI since July 2011.
- She is a Non-Executive Independent Director of Tata Elxsi Limited since 18 August 2011.
- She served as a Chairperson of the Advisory Board on Bank Commercial and Financial Frauds of the Central Vigilance Commission from 26 March 2012 to 26 March 2014.
- She served as a Chairperson of the Clearing Corporation of India Limited from 25 July 2012 to 25 July 2015.
- She served as a part-time Non Official Independent Director of GAIL (India) Limited from 29 February 2012 to 28 February 2015.
- She served as an Independent Director of E.I.D. - Parry (India) Limited from 30 January 2014 to 5 August 2015.
- She served as an Independent Director of Indian Oil Corporation Limited from 29 March 2012 to 25 June 2015.
- She served as an Independent Director at National Stock Exchange of India Ltd., from January 2012 to February 2014. This raised the question of conflict of interest.
- She was appointed as Independent Non-Executive on the Global Advisory Council of Ernst and Young in September 2011.
- She was appointed as Independent director on the Board of BASF India Limited in 2019.
- She is the Chairperson of Indian Institute of Management Raipur.

== Speeches ==
Shyamala Gopinath has given speeches in international and domestic fora. The topics range from approach to capital account management, centrality of banks in the financial system, macro prudential approach to regulation, over-the-counter derivative markets in India, pursuit of complete markets, changing dynamics of legal risks in the financial sector, technology in banks, retail payment systems and lessons for financial policy-making, among others.

== Interests ==
Gopinath has often expressed her keen interest in Carnatic Music, though she never aspired to be a singer.
