= Atanu Chakraborty =

Former Chairman of HDFC Bank

Former Chairperson of HDFC Bank
- In office 3 July 2021 – March 18 2026
- Preceded by: Shyamala Gopinath
- Succeeded by: Keki Mistry

Economic Affairs Secretary of India
- In office July 2019 – April 2020
- Appointed by: Appointments Committee of the Cabinet
- Preceded by: Subhash Chandra Garg
- Succeeded by: Ajay Seth

Personal details
- Born: 5 April 1960 (age 66)
- Education: NIT Kurukshetra; University of Hull; ICFAI Business School Hyderabad
- Occupation: Civil Servant

Atanu Chakraborty (born 5 April 1960) is a retired 1985 batch IAS officer of the Gujarat cadre, who served as the Chairman of HDFC Bank until 18th March 2026. He was appointed by the Reserve Bank of India in April 2021. He previously served as the Economic Affairs Secretary in Ministry of Finance Government of India until his retirement in April 2020. His participation in the economic policy making for India included Budget formulation, its passage in Parliament as well as fiscal management.

== Education ==
He holds a degree BTech in Electronics and Communication engineering from the National Institute of Technology, Kurukshetra. He completed his post-graduate diploma in business finance (ICFAI, Hyderabad) and an MBA from the University of Hull, United Kingdom.

== Career ==
Atanu Chakraborty is a retired 1985-batch Indian Administrative Service officer belonging to the Gujarat cadre and has served in various positions for both the Government of India and the Government of Gujarat. He has held positions in the Ministries of Finance, Ports, Industries, Petroleum and Natural Gas, Labour, and Home. He also served on the Boards of state-owned enterprises.

In the Government of Gujarat, Chakraborty served as the Additional Chief Secretary of Industries and as Principal Secretary of the Finance Department.

He was the chief executive of GSPC Group of companies, Gujarat State Fertilizers & Chemicals Limited (GSFC), GSFS Limited, and the Vice Chairman & CEO of Gujarat Maritime Board. He was also the CEO of Gujarat Alkalis and Chemicals Ltd (GACL). He has held the office of chief executive officer of Gujarat Infrastructure Development Board. This organisation manages the preparation and bidding of infrastructure projects, including preparing risks, sharing templates within the state of Gujarat. He also served as the chairperson of National Infrastructure and Investment Fund (NIIF). Chakraborty has held positions in the Ministry of Finance, Government of India. He held the posts of Secretary, DIPAM, and Secretary, Department of Economic Affairs. Chakraborty managed economic policy, tax policy, and budget management for the state of Gujarat as Secretary to the Government of Gujarat.

Chakraborty was an Independent Chairman on the Board of Yubi, formerly known as CredAvenue. He also Chairs the Boards of HDFC Bank Ltd, BAE (India) System Ltd.

Atanu Chakraborty has served as India’s alternate Governor on the Board of World Bank. He was also a Member of the Central Board of Directors of the Reserve Bank of India.

Atanu Chakraborty was appointed as the Union Economic Affairs Secretary by the Appointments Committee of the Cabinet (ACC) in July 2019. He was preceded by Subhash Chandra Garg.

He has served as Secretary of the Department of Investment and Public Asset Management (DIPAM) in the Ministry of Finance (India) where he handled divestment of state-owned enterprises.

Chakraborty has served as the Director General of Directorate General of Hydrocarbons (DGH) in the Ministry of Petroleum.

He also served as Managing Director of Gujarat State Financial Services Ltd.

Chakraborty was the MD of Gujarat State Petroleum Corporation, an Indian Oil & Gas company.

== Publications ==
1. BOT Law in the State of Gujarat; India Infrastructure Report 2000; Oxford University Press.
2. Status of Gas in India’s Fuel Basket; Economic & Political Weekly, Vol.40, Issue no 14, 02 April 2005.
3. Project Preparation – Cindrella of PSP (Private Sector Participation); India Infrastructure Report 2001; Oxford University Press.
4. Tariff Setting in Gas Transmission; India Infrastructure Report 2004; Oxford University Press.
5. Management of Contingent liabilities in Public Finances; Administrator, Volume 54, November 2013, Number 4, Lal Bahadur Shastri National Academy of Administration.
