= Sanjiv N. Sahai =

Independent Director of Bajaj Finserv

Sanjiv N Sahai, IAS (Retd.)
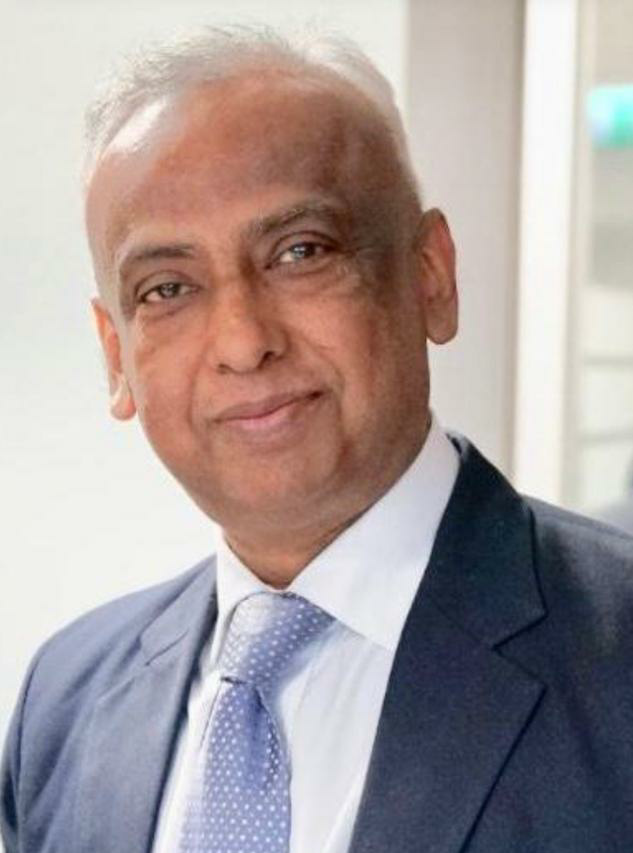

Independent Director of Bajaj Finserv
- Incumbent
- Assumed office 1 March 2025
- Appointed by: Board of directors of Bajaj Finserv

Power Secretary of India
- In office 2019–2021
- Appointed by: Appointments Committee of the Cabinet
- Preceded by: Subhash Chandra Garg
- Succeeded by: Alok Kumar

Additional Power Secretary of India
- In office March 2018 – July 2019

Principal Secretary of Finance, Home Planning of Government of Delhi
- In office March 2018 – December 2014

Personal details
- Born: 14 January 1961 (age 65) Bhagalpur, Bihar, India
- Education: (M.A.) Hindu College, Delhi; Delhi University (Master of Public Policy in Public Policy and Finance)Princeton University
- Occupation: retired IAS Officer

Sanjiv N. Sahai (born 14 January 1961) is a retired Indian Administrative Service officer of 1986 batch of Arunachal Pradesh-Goa-Mizoram and Union Territories cadre who is currently serving as the Independent Director of Bajaj Finserv since March 1, 2025 and before that he served as the Power Secretary of India.

== Early life ==
Sanjiv N. Sahai was born in Bhagalpur, Bihar. He spent his childhood in Jamshedpur, Jharkhand where he attended Loyola School. He moved to New Delhi to study history at Hindu College, Delhi. He has a master's degree in public policy from Princeton University, where he focused on economic policy.

He was a Robert McNamara fellow at Princeton University, and a recipient of the Joint Japan World Bank Fellowship.

== Career ==
Sanjiv Sahai started his career with Tata Group, and went on to join the Indian Administrative Service (IAS) in 1986. He served in a range of positions, including five years in the Prime Minister's Office, where he was worked closely on road and transport infrastructure. In 2004, he was also the chairman and managing director of Delhi Transport Corporation, while serving as the Secretary-cum-Commissioner of Transport for the Delhi Government. Later in 2005, he was appointed as the chairman of the Chandigarh Housing Board by the Union Ministry of Home Affairs.

In 2007 he was nominated by the Infrastructure Development Finance Company (IDFC) as managing director and CEO of the Delhi Integrated Multi-Modal Transit System (DIMTS), an urban transport and infrastructure development company with equal equity from the Government of Delhi (GNCTD) and the IDFC Foundation.

In 2015, Sahai was appointed Finance Secretary and Home Secretary in the Government of Delhi, where he led the team tasked with formulating the budget. His tenure as Home Secretary was marked by stand off between the Aam Aadmi Party Government and the Lieutenant Governor of Delhi over policing and justice affairs.

In May 2018, Sahai was posted as additional secretary to the Government of India in the Ministry of Power.

On 1 November 2019, Sahai became secretary to the Government of India in the Ministry of Power and served there till 31 January 2021.

After his retirement as secretary, Sahai was appointed as director of the Nehru Memorial Museum & Library in March 2022 where he served till March 2025.

He is currently serving as the Independent Director of Bajaj Finserv since March 1, 2025.

== Awards ==
- Governor's gold medal for outstanding service in Arunachal Pradesh
- Asia Pacific HRM Congress Awards’ CEO with HR Orientation Award 2013 by Institute of Public Enterprises (IPE)
