= Yogesh Kumar Tyagi =

Indian academic

22nd Vice Chancellor 2016-2021 University of Delhi
- In office 10 March 2016 – 09 March 2021
- Preceded by: Dinesh Singh
- Succeeded by: Yogesh Singh

Yogesh Kumar Tyagi is an Indian academic who served as the 22nd vice-chancellor of the University of Delhi from March 2016 to March 2021. He also served as dean of the Faculty of Legal Studies at the South Asian University, where he was involved in establishing a department for international law. Tyagi has authored articles in international academic journals, including a study on the United Nations Human Rights Committee published by Cambridge University Press.

== Education ==
Tyagi earned his Master of Laws (LL.M.) from Columbia Law School in New York, and later obtained a Master of Philosophy (MPhil) and a Doctor of Philosophy (PhD) from Jawaharlal Nehru University (JNU) in New Delhi.

== Career ==
Tyagi was a professor of international law at Jawaharlal Nehru University, and was a member of both the Institut de Droit International and the Law Commission of India. He later served as vice-chancellor of the University of Delhi from March 2016 to March 2021.
