= Yogesh Singh =

Indian academic and university administrator

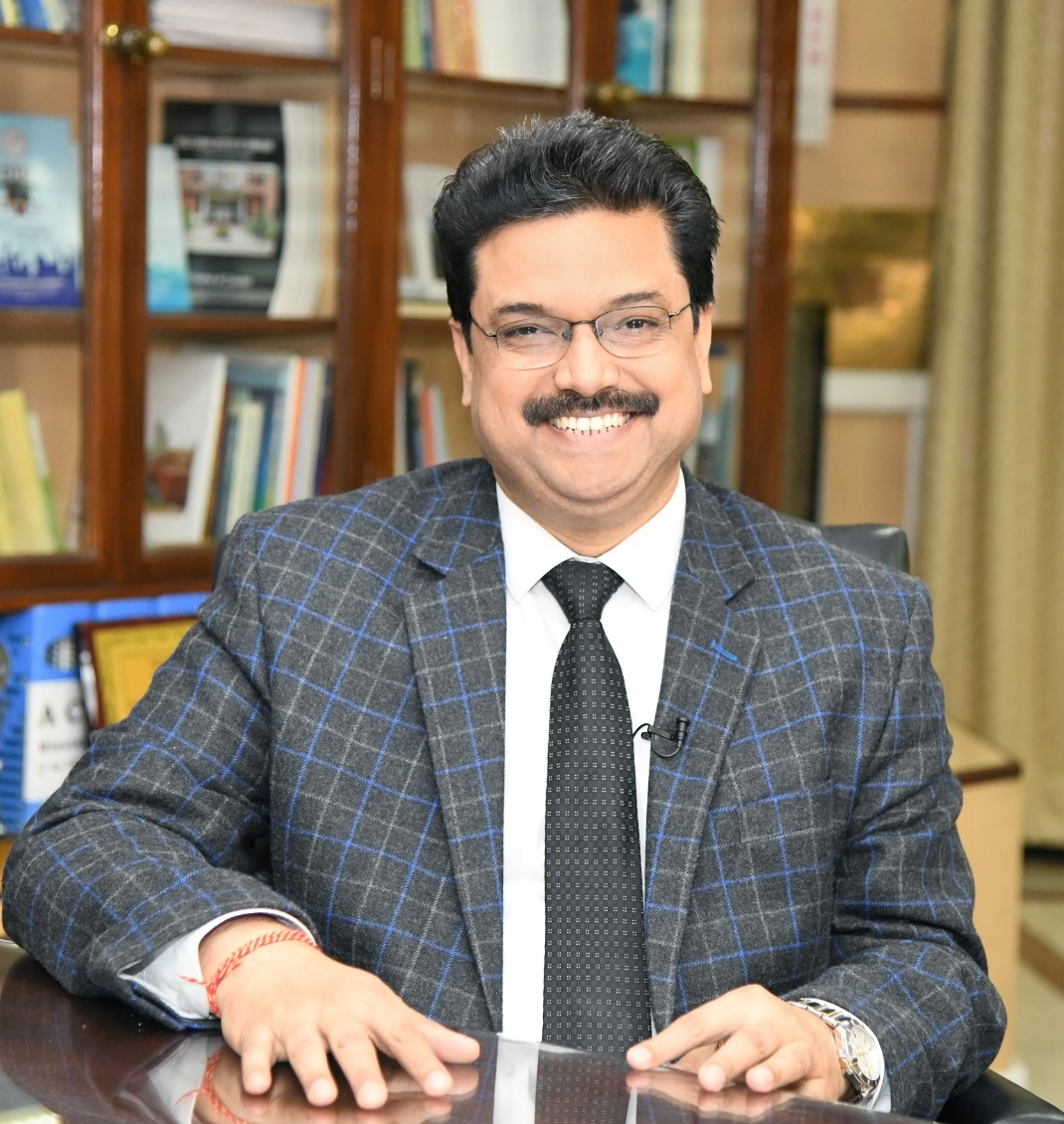
- Singh in 2015

23rd Vice-Chancellor of the University of Delhi
- Incumbent
- Assumed office 8 October 2021
- Preceded by: Yogesh Kumar Tyagi

Personal details
- Born: 13 April 1966 Aligarh, Uttar Pradesh, India
- Education: National Institute of Technology, Kurukshetra
- Website: University of Delhi

Yogesh Singh (born 13 April 1966) is an Indian academic, researcher and university administrator serving as the 23rd Vice-Chancellor of the University of Delhi. He assumed office on 8 October 2021 and commenced a second consecutive five-year term on 8 October 2026, following his reappointment by the President of India in her capacity as Visitor of the university. The reappointment followed an amendment to the university's statutes in 2023 permitting a Vice-Chancellor to serve a second consecutive term.

Before joining Delhi University, Singh served as Vice-Chancellor of Delhi Technological University and The Maharaja Sayajirao University of Baroda, Director of Netaji Subhas Institute of Technology, and Dean of Information Technology at Guru Gobind Singh Indraprastha University. His academic qualifications include a Master of Technology degree in Electronics and Communication Engineering and a Ph.D. in Computer Engineering from the National Institute of Technology, Kurukshetra. His principal research interests include software engineering.

During his vice-chancellorship, Delhi University implemented major provisions of the National Education Policy 2020, introduced the Undergraduate Curriculum Framework 2022 and four-year undergraduate programmes, and adopted the Common University Entrance Test for undergraduate admissions. His tenure has also included academic restructuring, institutional development and university infrastructure expansion.

In December 2025, Singh was entrusted with the additional charge of Chairman of the All India Council for Technical Education (AICTE), alongside his responsibilities at Delhi University. His academic and administrative career has included leadership roles in engineering education, curriculum development, university governance, institutional accreditation and national-level higher education administration.

== Education and research ==
Yogesh Singh earned his Master of Technology (M.Tech.) degree in Electronics and Communication Engineering and his Doctor of Philosophy (Ph.D.) degree in Computer Engineering from the National Institute of Technology, Kurukshetra, Haryana, India.

His principal area of academic research is software engineering. According to his official University of Delhi biography, he has supervised 23 doctoral researchers and has authored or co-authored more than 250 publications in national and international journals and conference proceedings.

His academic books include Software Testing (Cambridge University Press, 2011), a book on software engineering published by New Age International (2002), and Object-Oriented Software Engineering (PHI Learning, 2012).

In 2010, Singh received the Best Research Award in Engineering and Technology from Guru Gobind Singh Indraprastha University.

He also participated in the Yale-India Leadership Programme at Yale University in 2011.

== Career and professional activities ==
Yogesh Singh has held senior academic and administrative positions at several Indian universities and national educational institutions. His career has included appointments as Dean, Director and Vice-Chancellor, as well as responsibilities in bodies concerned with higher education, technical education and institutional accreditation.

=== Guru Gobind Singh Indraprastha University ===
Singh became a professor of computer engineering at Guru Gobind Singh Indraprastha University, Delhi, at the age of 35. He subsequently held several academic and administrative responsibilities at the institution.

From 2001 to 2006, he served as Dean of the University School of Information Technology and held responsibilities associated with engineering and technology education. He also served as Dean of the University School of Engineering and Technology during this period.

His other administrative appointments included University Proctor (2001–2006), Chief Warden (2001–2009), Director of Students' Welfare (2006–2009) and Controller of Examinations (2006–2011).

These responsibilities preceded his appointment as Vice-Chancellor of The Maharaja Sayajirao University of Baroda in 2011.

=== The Maharaja Sayajirao University of Baroda ===
Singh served as the 16th Vice-Chancellor of The Maharaja Sayajirao University of Baroda, Gujarat, from 7 July 2011 to 29 December 2014. He assumed office at the age of 45. The Government of Gujarat subsequently granted him a second term, which continued until December 2014.

During his tenure, the university undertook developments in academic administration, digital infrastructure and institutional management. Its institutional records describe initiatives involving high-speed internet connectivity, campus Wi-Fi facilities, digital student lifecycle management, administrative workflow systems and human resource management systems.

Other institutional developments recorded during his vice-chancellorship concerned infrastructure improvement, academic administration and strengthening linkages with industry.

Singh also held responsibilities in technical education regulation during this period. From December 2011 to May 2014, he served as Chairman of the Central Regional Committee of the All India Council for Technical Education (AICTE), based in Bhopal. The committee covered Madhya Pradesh, Chhattisgarh and Gujarat.

In May 2013, Singh was appointed an independent director of Gujarat State Petronet Limited, a Gujarat government undertaking. He subsequently served as an independent director of Gujarat State Petroleum Corporation Limited from March 2015.

=== Netaji Subhas Institute of Technology ===
Following his tenure at Baroda, Singh was appointed Director of Netaji Subhas Institute of Technology (NSIT), Delhi, on 31 December 2014. The institution subsequently became Netaji Subhas University of Technology.

The university's official record of former directors lists his tenure from 31 December 2014 to 24 July 2017.

During his association with NSIT, Singh was also entrusted with responsibilities at Delhi Technological University, resulting in overlapping administrative appointments at the two institutions.

=== Delhi Technological University ===
In September 2015, Singh was entrusted with additional charge as Vice-Chancellor of Delhi Technological University (DTU). He subsequently became its third Vice-Chancellor, serving a regular term from 14 July 2016 to 13 July 2021.

He was granted a second term in 2021 and continued as Vice-Chancellor until 7 October 2021, immediately before assuming office at the University of Delhi.

His appointment at DTU followed several years of administrative experience in university governance, engineering education and technical institutions.

=== University of Delhi ===
Singh was appointed the 23rd Vice-Chancellor of the University of Delhi in September 2021. He formally assumed office on 8 October 2021, succeeding Yogesh Kumar Tyagi.

His appointment coincided with preparations for the university's centenary celebrations and the implementation of reforms associated with the National Education Policy 2020.

During his first term, Delhi University introduced the Undergraduate Curriculum Framework 2022 and implemented the four-year undergraduate programme. These reforms included restructuring of degree programmes, multidisciplinary learning opportunities, skill-based courses, revised curricula and greater flexibility in academic pathways.

In 2022, the university also adopted the Common University Entrance Test (CUET) for undergraduate admissions, replacing its earlier system based primarily on Class XII examination marks. The transition was accompanied by the introduction of the Common Seat Allocation System for undergraduate admissions.

The university also introduced Bachelor of Technology programmes in Computer Science and Engineering, Electrical Engineering, and Electronics and Communication Engineering during this period.

In August 2025, Delhi University received an A++ grade from the National Assessment and Accreditation Council (NAAC), with a cumulative grade point average of 3.55 in its second accreditation cycle. Singh attributed the result to the collective contributions of faculty members, students, non-teaching employees, alumni and other stakeholders.

The university also pursued institutional expansion, infrastructure development, academic restructuring and the establishment of new academic centres during Singh's first term.

==== Second term as Vice-Chancellor ====
In July 2026, Singh was reappointed as Vice-Chancellor of the University of Delhi for a second consecutive term of five years. The reappointment was approved by the President of India, acting in her capacity as Visitor of the university, under Statute 11-F of the university's statutes.

The decision was communicated through a letter from the Ministry of Education, Department of Higher Education, bearing reference number F.No. 2-8/2026-CU.II and dated 2 July 2026.

The Registrar of the University of Delhi subsequently issued an official notification on 7 July 2026 confirming that Singh's second term would begin on 8 October 2026.

The reappointment followed an amendment to the university's statutes approved by the Union government in 2023. The amendment modified Statute 11-F(4), making an incumbent Vice-Chancellor eligible for reappointment for another five-year term.

Before the statutory amendment, an incumbent Vice-Chancellor seeking another term was required to participate in a fresh selection process. The change allowed reappointment for a second consecutive term.

Singh became the first Vice-Chancellor of Delhi University to receive a second consecutive five-year term through the amended reappointment provision.

His second term commenced on 8 October 2026. The reappointment followed his first five-year tenure, during which the university had implemented major provisions of the National Education Policy 2020, introduced the four-year undergraduate curriculum, adopted CUET-based admissions and undertaken institutional restructuring.

=== National-level educational and professional responsibilities ===
In addition to his appointments at universities, Singh has served on several academic, regulatory and governing bodies concerned with higher and technical education in India.

He has served as a member of the General Council of the National Assessment and Accreditation Council and the Governing Council of the Association of Indian Universities. He became a member of the Executive Committee of NAAC with effect from 3 October 2019.

Singh has also served as Chairman of the Governing Board of the Information and Library Network Centre (INFLIBNET), an autonomous inter-university centre of the University Grants Commission, based in Gandhinagar, Gujarat.

He has held responsibilities associated with the National Council for Teacher Education (NCTE). In August 2023, he was entrusted with additional charge as Director of the School of Planning and Architecture, Delhi.

In December 2025, the Ministry of Education entrusted Singh with the additional charge of Chairman of the All India Council for Technical Education, following the completion of the tenure of T. G. Sitharam. The appointment was made until the selection of a regular Chairman or further government orders.

His professional appointments have therefore included responsibilities in university administration, engineering education, curriculum development, institutional accreditation and national technical education governance.

== Public speeches and reception ==
Yogesh Singh has delivered public addresses at university convocations, academic conferences, research seminars, literary festivals, institutional celebrations and educational forums. His speeches have addressed higher education reform, research and innovation, technological development, Indian knowledge traditions, literature, cultural heritage, constitutional values and national development. The University of Delhi maintains an official archive of his recorded speeches and messages.

=== Higher education, academic excellence and research ===
Singh has emphasised the importance of research, academic standards and institutional development in higher education. In an interview with The Indian Express in November 2022, he discussed the introduction of the four-year undergraduate programme, reforms in university admissions and the need to strengthen research culture among teachers. He also expressed the aspiration that Delhi University should improve its position among internationally ranked universities.

His statements on higher education have also addressed the relationship between curriculum flexibility, multidisciplinary learning, academic inquiry and students' professional development. In discussing the Common University Entrance Test, Singh presented the reform as a means of addressing differences between school examination boards and providing a more standardised basis for admissions.

As Vice-Chancellor, Singh has delivered addresses at successive annual convocations of the University of Delhi, including its 98th, 99th, 100th, 101st and 102nd convocations. These ceremonial addresses form part of the university's official record of academic and institutional activities.

=== Education, innovation and Viksit Bharat 2047 ===
Singh has discussed the relationship between education, technological advancement, entrepreneurship and national development. His recorded public engagements include the programme Sankalp: Viksit Bharat@2047, held in February 2024, which addressed the long-term national development objective associated with 2047.

During an interaction with students at Hansraj College in April 2026, Singh described education as an instrument of social transformation and emphasised the importance of research, innovation and entrepreneurship. He encouraged students to develop their capabilities and consider their contributions to India's future development.

His educational views have also addressed the use of emerging technologies and the relationship between technological skills and broader intellectual development.

=== Indian knowledge traditions and cultural heritage ===
Singh has participated in academic discussions concerning Indian philosophy, classical texts, cultural history and the place of traditional knowledge within contemporary education.

His official speech archive includes addresses on the relevance of the Bhagavad Gita to the Indian legal system and programmes examining India's civilisational heritage and community governance. He has also participated in events concerning the integration of philosophical and ethical traditions into educational discussion.

In November 2025, Singh addressed several programmes commemorating 150 years of Vande Mataram. His recorded engagements have also included book releases, discussions of India's freedom struggle and academic programmes concerned with literature and cultural traditions.

=== Science, technology and interdisciplinary research ===
Singh has participated in conferences addressing scientific research, artificial intelligence, technological innovation and interdisciplinary scholarship.

His recorded addresses include the International Conference on Artificial Intelligence and Knowledge Management in June 2024, an international conference on nuclear physics and applications in October 2024 and the national conference Fungi for Bharat in November 2025.

In public interviews, he has connected research activity with the broader responsibilities of universities, including the development of knowledge, technological capabilities and opportunities for innovation.

=== Literature, intellectual development and international engagement ===
Singh addressed the inaugural and valedictory sessions of the Delhi University Literature Festival in February 2026. The festival brought together participants from literature, journalism, scholarship and cultural fields.

His recorded academic engagements also include programmes concerning literary traditions, historical memory and international academic relations. On 20 February 2026, he participated in a lecture titled Bridging Continents: Croatia and India in a Connected World.

Other recorded addresses have concerned environmental sustainability, women's participation in public life, constitutional values and civic responsibilities. These include academic programmes marking Constitution Day and conferences addressing environmental and social issues.

=== Remarks on extremism and academic responsibility ===
On 28 September 2025, Singh delivered an address at the Bharat Manthan 2025 programme, Naxal Mukt Bharat: Ending Red Terror Under Modi's Leadership, held at Vigyan Bhawan, New Delhi. The event was organised by the Dr Syama Prasad Mookerjee Research Foundation in partnership with the Association of Indian Universities.

In his speech, Singh expressed concern about what he described as the influence of "urban Naxalism" within universities. He called upon teachers and educational institutions to challenge extremist political ideologies and discussed the responsibilities of academic institutions in shaping students' intellectual development. He also criticised certain forms of campus activism and referred to the activities of particular student movements and academics.

The remarks attracted criticism from student organisations, academics and civil liberties groups. The People's Union for Civil Liberties argued that the speech risked discouraging legitimate dissent and undermining academic freedom. Student organisations, including the All India Students' Association, organised protests and objected to the characterisation of campus political activity.

The speech also received a supportive response in a subscriber-contributed opinion article by academic Hitesh Raviya, titled Professors Shaping Nations, Not Polluting Minds, published in ThePrint on 10 October 2025. Raviya defended Singh's remarks, interpreting them as an appeal for intellectual responsibility and opposition to ideological indoctrination rather than a rejection of academic freedom. He argued that universities should combine freedom of thought with responsibility towards society and national development. The article appeared in ThePrint's subscriber-contribution section, which publishes reader opinions without editorial fact-checking.

The responses to Singh's address formed part of a broader public debate concerning extremism, political activism, academic freedom and the responsibilities of universities.

=== Selected speeches and recorded addresses ===
The following is a chronological list of recorded or documented addresses attributed to Singh. The University of Delhi also maintains a collection of the Vice-Chancellor's speeches and messages.

==== 2013 ====
- 23 Mar 2013: Women and Leadership Symposium — MSU Baroda.

==== 2017 ====
- 2 Aug 2017: Orientation Address to Newly Admitted Students — DTU.
- 15 Aug 2017: 71st Independence Day Address — DTU.
- 1 Sep 2017: Orientation Address to Newly Joined Assistant Professors — DTU.
- 15 Dec 2017: 4th Convocation — Vice-Chancellor’s Report / Address — DTU.

==== 2018 ====
- 26 Jan 2018: 69th Republic Day Address — DTU.
- 2 Aug 2018: Orientation Programme Address — DTU.
- 15 Aug 2018: 72nd Independence Day Address — DTU.

==== 2019 ====
- 26 Jan 2019: Republic Day Address — DTU.
- 2 Aug 2019: Orientation Programme Address — DTU.
- 15 Aug 2019: 73rd Independence Day Address — DTU.
- 13 Dec 2019: 6th Convocation Address — DTU.

==== 2020 ====
- 23 Jan 2020: YUVAAN 2020 Literature & Film Festival — Inaugural Address — DTU.
- 24 Dec 2020: 7th Convocation Address — DTU.

==== 2021 ====
- 26 Oct 2021: Vigilance Awareness Week Address — University of Delhi.
- 9 Dec 2021: DU e-Library Launch Address — University of Delhi.

==== 2022 ====
- 26 Jan 2022: Republic Day Address — University of Delhi.
- 30 Jan 2022: Martyrs’ Day Address — Gandhi Bhawan — University of Delhi.
- 24 Feb 2022: Lecture: Swadhinata Se Swatantrata Ki Ore — University of Delhi.
- 26 Feb 2022: 98th Annual Convocation Address — University of Delhi.
- 24 Mar 2022: Martyrdom of Shaheed Bhagat Singh & Associates — University of Delhi.
- 1 May 2022: Centenary Celebrations Inaugural Address — University of Delhi.
- 13 May 2022: Release of Works on Bharat-2047: Samuhik Sankalpana — University of Delhi.
- 19 May 2022: Inaugural Address: Swaraj Se Nav-Bharat Tak — University of Delhi.
- 20–21 May 2022: International Symposium: Swaraj Se Nav-Bharat Tak Bharat Ke Vicharon Ka Punravalokan — University of Delhi.
- 21 Jun 2022: Yoga Week / International Day of Yoga Address — University of Delhi.
- 22 Jun 2022: International Yoga Day — with Swami Ramdev — University of Delhi.
- 5 Jul 2022: Discussion on Modi@20: Dreams Meet Delivery — S. Jaishankar — University of Delhi.
- 20 Jul 2022: Discussion on Modi@20: Dreams Meet Delivery — Uday Mahurkar — University of Delhi.
- 10 Nov 2022: Inaugural Address at International Conference — University of Delhi.
- 13 Nov 2022: Workshop-cum-Book Discussion on Independence & Partition of India — University of Delhi.
- 18 Nov 2022: DU Centenary Run Address — University of Delhi.
- 25 Nov 2022: National Seminar: Footprints of Women in Making of Bharat — University of Delhi.
- 25 Nov 2022: Lecture: Working and Living Together in Kashmir under Sultan Zain-ul-Abidin — University of Delhi.

==== 2023 ====
- 26 Jan 2023: 74th Republic Day Address — University of Delhi.
- 25 Feb 2023: 99th Annual Convocation Address — University of Delhi.
- 22 Mar 2023: Special Lecture on G20 & Annual Award Ceremony — University of Delhi.
- 21 Apr 2023: Centenary Alumni Meet Address — University of Delhi.
- 15 Jun 2023: Centenary Year Meet of Former Faculty — Presidential Address — University of Delhi.
- 30 Jun 2023: Valedictory Ceremony of DU Centenary Celebrations — University of Delhi.
- 29 Sep 2023: JST Sakura Science Indian Universities Program — Closing Address — University of Delhi / Japan.

==== 2024 ====
- 26 Jan 2024: Republic Day Address — University of Delhi.
- 19 Feb 2024: Sankalp: Viksit Bharat @2047 — University of Delhi.
- 24 Feb 2024: 100th Annual Convocation Address — University of Delhi.
- 1 Mar 2024: 66th Annual Flower Show Address — University of Delhi.
- 7 Mar 2024: Viksit Bharat Ambassador Nari Shakti Conclave — University of Delhi.
- 20 Apr 2024: NCWEB Bharat Manthan — University of Delhi.
- 30 Apr 2024: Conference on Climate Impact: Climate & Sustainability — University of Delhi.
- 2 May 2024: Awareness Campaign on Three New Criminal Laws — University of Delhi.
- 8 May 2024: Book Release Function Address — University of Delhi.
- 16 May 2024: Discussion on We and the World Around — University of Delhi.
- 21 Jun 2024: International Yoga Day Address — University of Delhi.
- 21 Jun 2024: International Conference on Artificial Intelligence & Knowledge Management — University of Delhi.
- 1 Jul 2024: FMS Batch 2024–2026 Inaugural Address — Faculty of Management Studies, DU.
- 1 Jul 2024: Seminar: Implementation of New Criminal Laws — The Way Forward — University of Delhi.
- 14 Aug 2024: Vibhajan Vibhishika Smriti Diwas — University of Delhi.
- 15 Aug 2024: 78th Independence Day Address — University of Delhi.
- 7 Oct 2024: "Golden Day / Swarn Din" Address — University of Delhi.
- 21–25 Oct 2024: International Conference on Nuclear Physics and Applications — University of Delhi.
- 2024 — date to verify: Integrating Bhagavad Gita’s Values in Modern Education and Management — University of Delhi.
- 26 Nov 2024: Banaye Jeevan Pranvan — Book Release Address — University of Delhi.
- 26 Dec 2024: Veer Bal Diwas Address — University of Delhi.

==== 2025 ====
- 4 Jan 2025: Samarpan Samaroh — University of Delhi.
- 9 Jan 2025: International Conference on India’s Foreign Policy — University of Delhi.
- 22 Jan 2025: Laying of the Cornerstone Ceremony — University of Delhi.
- 26 Jan 2025: 76th Republic Day Address — University of Delhi.
- 22 Feb 2025: 101st Annual Convocation Address — University of Delhi.
- 28 Feb 2025: 67th Annual Flower Show Address — University of Delhi.
- 6 Mar 2025: International Women’s Day Address — University of Delhi.
- 4 Apr 2025: Felicitation Ceremony of Smt. Rekha Gupta — University of Delhi.
- 7 May 2025: Annual Sports Awards Function Address — University of Delhi.
- 1 Jul 2025: FMS Batch 2025–2027 Inaugural Address — Faculty of Management Studies.
- 28 Jul 2025: Ek Bharat – Shreshtha Bharat – Akhand Bharat — University of Delhi.
- 5 Aug 2025: Inauguration Ceremony of New Academic Block — University of Delhi.
- 6 Aug 2025: Lecture on The New World: 21st Century Global Order and India — University of Delhi.
- 15 Aug 2025: 79th Independence Day Address — University of Delhi.
- 21 Aug 2025: Seema-Vimarsh 2025 — University of Delhi.
- 26 Aug 2025: Book Release & Discussion: Mera Bachpan Mere Kandhon Par — University of Delhi.
- 28 Sep 2025: Naxal Mukt Bharat: Why Campuses Are the Targets? — University of Delhi.
- 7 Oct 2025: Faculty of Law Symposium / Hate Speech & Electoral Politics — University of Delhi.
- 15 Oct 2025: New Rules and Procedures for Foreign Students — University of Delhi.
- 13 Nov 2025: Relevance of the Bhagavad Gita in the Indian Legal System — University of Delhi.
- 14 Nov 2025: Bharat’s Civilizational Heritage and Dharma-based Community Governance — University of Delhi.
- 14 Nov 2025: 150 Years of Vande Mataram — University of Delhi.
- 17 Nov 2025: 150 Years of Vande Mataram — Dyal Singh College (Evening) — University of Delhi.
- 18 Nov 2025: Popular Punjabi Culture — University of Delhi.
- 19 Nov 2025: 150 Years of Vande Mataram — IP College — University of Delhi.
- 20 Nov 2025: National Conference: FUNGI for BHARAT — University of Delhi.
- 20 Nov 2025: Bharat Bauddhiks Book-Series Release — University of Delhi.
- 21 Nov 2025: Book Release: 101 Great Revolution Freedom Fighter of India — University of Delhi.
- 24 Nov 2025: One-Day National Conference on Constitution Day — University of Delhi.
- 25 Nov 2025: Cyber Satarkata — Cyber Security Awareness Address — University of Delhi.
- 26 Nov 2025: 150 Years of Vande Mataram — DU archival speech — University of Delhi.

==== 2026 ====
- 26 Jan 2026: 77th Republic Day Address — University of Delhi.
- 12 Feb 2026: Inaugural Address — DU Literature Festival — University of Delhi.
- 14 Feb 2026: Valedictory Address — DU Literature Festival — University of Delhi.
- 20 Feb 2026: Lecture: Bridging Continents: Croatia and India in a Connected World — University of Delhi.
- 28 Feb 2026: 102nd Annual Convocation Address — University of Delhi.
- 15 Aug 2026: 80th Independence Day Address — University of Delhi.
- 5 Oct 2026: World Teachers' Day 2026 Address — Address by Prof. Yogesh Singh at the World Teachers' Day programme organised by Delhi Technological University. Video published on 8 October 2026.
- 24 Sep 2026: India's Contribution to the World: Past, Present and Future — Address at a programme organised by Swadeshi Shodh Sansthan on the occasion of Pandit Deendayal Upadhyaya's birth anniversary.
- 27 Oct 2026: शुभ दीपावली: तमसो मा ज्योतिर्गमय — Deepavali message by Prof. Yogesh Singh, Vice-Chancellor of the University of Delhi.
- 27 Oct 2026: Life and Work of Prof. Yogesh Singh — An interview or recorded conversation concerning his personal life, academic career and professional contributions.
- 20 Nov 2026: VC's Speech – 103rd Annual Convocation — Address by Prof. Yogesh Singh, Vice-Chancellor of the University of Delhi, at the university's 103rd Annual Convocation, held on 20 November 2026. Published by the University of Delhi on its official YouTube channel.
