= National Institute of Technology, Kurukshetra =

Public engineering institute located in Kurukshetra

Coordinates: 29.94906°N 76.817254°E

- Former names: Regional Engineering College, Kurukshetra
- Motto: Shramo Anavarat Chesta Cha (Sanskrit)
- Motto in English: Hard Work and Consistent Efforts
- Type: Public engineering school
- Established: 1963; 63 years ago
- Chairman: Tejaswini Ananth Kumar
- Director: Brahmjit Singh (acting)
- Undergraduates: 3600
- Postgraduates: 1200
- Location: Kurukshetra, Haryana, India
- Campus: Sub-urban
- Website: www.nitkkr.ac.in

National Institute of Technology Kurukshetra (NIT Kurukshetra or NITKKR) is a public technical and research university located in Kurukshetra, Haryana, India. In December 2008, it was accredited with the status of Institute of National Importance (INI). It is one of the 31 National Institutes of Technology established and administered by Government of India. It runs undergraduate and postgraduate in programme Engineering and Doctor of Philosophy programme in Engineering, Sciences and Humanities.

== History ==
The first Prime Minister of independent India, Jawaharlal Nehru, sought to develop India as a leader in science and technology. Between 1959 and 1965, with this vision, the Government founded 14 educational institutions in different regions of India. The system of competitive entry (based on merit) gave access to higher education in these institutions. Such an institution was established in 1963 in Kurukshetra as a joint enterprise of the Government of India and the Government of Punjab, India as the Regional Engineering College, Kurukshetra (REC Kurukshetra). In 2002, all the Regional Engineering Colleges were unified by a common entrance exam. Therefore, REC Kurukshetra was renamed to National Institute of Technology under the NIT Act and was given a Deemed University status.

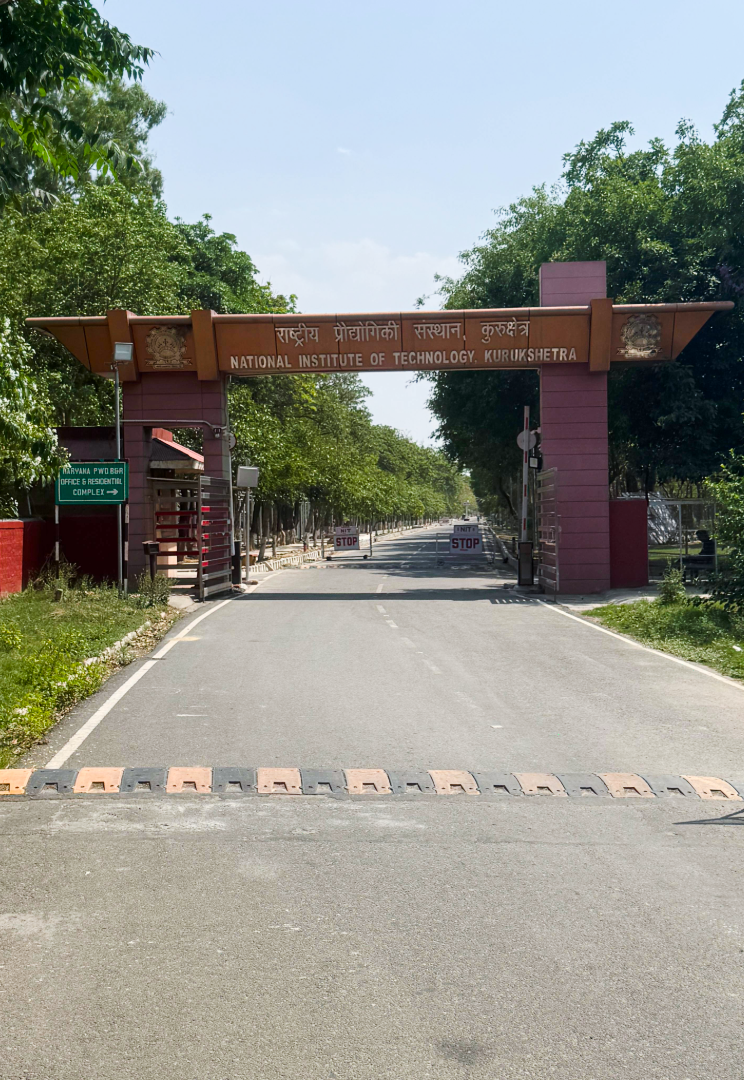
Back gate of NIT Kurukshetra

== Campus ==
=== Hostels ===
There are 15 hostels: 11 for boys and 4 for girls (some apartments are available for married students). The names of the hostels are listed below:

==== Boys ====
- Abhimanyu Bhawan
- Bhishma Bhawan
- Chakradhar Bhawan
- Dronacharya Bhawan
- Eklavya Bhawan
- Fanibhushan Bhawan
- Girivar Bhawan
- Harihar Bhawan
- Indivar Bhawan
- Visveswaraya Mega Boys Hostel
- Vivekananda Bhawan

==== Girls ====
- Alaknanda Bhawan
- Cauvery Bhawan
- Bhagirathi Bhawan
- Kalpana Chawla Mega Girls Hostel

== Academics ==
=== Academic programmes ===
NIT Kurukshetra awards undergraduate B.Tech. in various engineering fields in a four-year programme. It offers postgraduate (PG) M.Tech. degrees in similar engineering fields as well as Physics. The M.Tech. degree is awarded after four semesters (two years) or two semesters for relevant PG diploma holders. Ph.D. research programmes are offered in engineering, sciences, humanities and social sciences as well as computer applications. As of 2006 it also offers an MBA degree.

=== Admissions ===
==== Undergraduate (Bachelor of Technology) ====
Until 2012, admissions were made on the basis of merit in the All India Engineering Entrance Examination. This exam consisted of a section each on Mathematics, Physics and Chemistry. Every year, more than 1,000,000 students appeared for this exam and the acceptance rate was close to 3%.

Starting in 2013, admissions are now made on the basis of the merit list of Joint Entrance Examination. This is a common examination for all the premier universities in India. Under this, the candidates are ranked based on 60% of the marks scored in the test, and 40% of the marks in the grade XII board examinations.

For foreign students, admissions are done through Direct Admission of Students Abroad (DASA) scheme.

==== Postgraduate ====
NIT Kurukshetra accepts applications to the following degrees under the postgraduate course:

- Master of Technology (through GATE score)
- Master of Business Administration (through CAT/JMET score, followed by group discussions and personal interview)
- Master of Computer Application (through NIMCET score)

For M.Tech. admission, seats are first filled up by admitting GATE qualified candidates and then by industry sponsored candidates. Remaining vacant seats are offered to Non-GATE candidates with a minimum of 60% marks (55% for SC candidates) in their qualifying examination. While GATE candidates are eligible for a scholarship of Rs.12400/- per month. Non-GATE candidates are not given any scholarship.

==== Ph.D. ====
Applications on prescribed proforma are invited for admission to Ph.D. (full–time/part–time) programmes.

=== Rankings ===
Engineering rankings

Engineering – India
- NIRF (2023): 58
- NIRF (2024): 81

NITKKR is ranked 81st among the engineering colleges of India by National Institutional Ranking Framework (NIRF) in 2024.

== Student life ==
=== Festivals ===
These are the major festivals that take place at NIT Kurukshetra every year.

- Techspardha: Theme for Techspardha'18 PRIME was "Realm of Possibilities". It is the main technical festival of the institute. Various technology based activities and events are organised and a large number of students participate in such events, thus, adding to the popularity of this Tech-festival.
- Confluence: It is the annual cultural festival of the institute. Many colleges from the state as well as from the other parts of the nation take part in Confluence. It is a three-day event and has been visited by some of the most famous artists and personalities of the county in the past few years. For Confluence’19 the theme is ‘Carnival of Heritage’.

== Notable alumni ==
- Pawan Munjal
- Srini Raju
- Rakesh Bakshi
- S N Subrahmanyan
- Yogesh Singh
- Atanu Chakraborty
- Shatrujeet Singh Kapoor
