= Four Year Undergraduate Programme protests =

The Four Year Undergraduate Programme Row or FYUP Row involved a series of protests by local students and teachers against the implementation of certain controversial reforms and education policies at the University of Delhi. The protests intensified between 2013 and 2014, when a new four-year undergraduate programme was started by the administrative authorities at the university.

In June 2014, following the change of power in the central government from the Congress-led UPA to the BJP-led NDA government, the University Grants Commission (UGC) had sent a legal notice to the management, directing the university to immediately scrap the four-year programme and revert to the earlier three-year undergraduate degree, as it had claimed that it found the four-year programme to be in violation with the National Policy of Education in India.

However, it was reported that a panel in the UGC had once again recommended the programme during the current NDA government regime led by the BJP in 2019. In July 2020, the BJP government announced a new National Educational Policy underlining a four-year undergraduate structure with a choice-based credit system. The policy has been criticised by academics once again.

== Stand-off between Delhi University and the UGC ==
The BJP government's Smriti Irani was the one to have earlier enabled the move to undo the Congress government's FYUP syllabus back in 2014 immediately after she came to power as the then Education Minister. Proponents of the FYUP programme and some other members of the academic fraternity had felt that the UGC's directive to the university to revert to the old structure was a step against its autonomy. One of these proponents of the FYUP who opposed the Irani-led rollback also included BB Bhattacharya, the former vice chancellor of the Jawaharlal Nehru University in Delhi.

The initial proposal for the FYUP had been initiated by the then Congress government's Education Ministry led by Kapil Sibal. The Kapil Sibal–initiated reforms were seen as a move to privatise a public university, as part of the previous Congress-led UPA government's agenda to enable foreign universities to set up campuses in India. They instead stressed upon the need for greater public policy and regulation in the education system.

== The FYUP ==
The programme was structured such that it would be inter-disciplinary, which was not the case in the traditional honours programme. It also provided multiple exit points, which meant students could withdraw from the programme mid-way as well, with a lower diploma or other kind of certificate, after the first or second or third year of the course. The three-year honours programme is discipline-specific, offering a full specialisation in any one academic area from the arts or sciences or commerce stream. The syllabus of the four-year undergraduate programme, on the other hand, consisted of eleven compulsory foundation courses including language, literature and creativity, information technology, business, entrepreneurship and management, science and life, history of science (for visually impaired students), Indian history and culture, building mathematical ability and awareness (for visually impaired students), governance and citizenship, philosophy, psychology, communication and life skills, geographic and socio-economic diversity, environment and public health, and an applied language course (in English, Hindi, Bengali, Arabic, Persian, Punjabi, Sanskrit or Urdu).

According to updates and sources on the university website, these foundation courses were designed with the intention of addressing issues related to economic development, energy, water, urbanisation, rural culture, infrastructure, transport, sanitation, environment, public health, food security, agriculture, education, literacy, ethics, and social justice. The methodology of teaching was meant to inculcate a participatory ethos, with a minimised pressure on reading, and a greater emphasis on presentation skills.

Over and above the foundation course were the applied language courses and the "Discipline (DC) I" and "Discipline (DC) II" courses that would pertain to a student's choice of major and minor specialisations respectively. There were also a set of vocational courses, and finally a course on the "integration of mind, body, and heart", which was to be based on Gandhian philosophy.

== Media Coverage ==
The Times of India maintained a balanced coverage on the protests and initially interviewed members of the student-teacher community as well as later the administrative staff, without taking any stand of its own. The Hindu newspaper and The Hindustan Times opposed the reforms but also criticised the UGC for interfering with the autonomy of the university after the Smriti Irani–led ministry ordered a rollback.
