= 1932 New Year Honours =

British royal recognitions

The 1932 New Year Honours were appointments by King George V to various orders and honours to reward and highlight good works by citizens of the United Kingdom and British Empire. They were announced on 29 December 1931.

The recipients of honours are displayed here as they were styled before their new honour, and arranged by honour, with classes (Knight, Knight Grand Cross, etc.) and then divisions (Military, Civil, etc.) as appropriate.

== United Kingdom and British Empire ==
=== Viscount ===
- The Right Honourable John, Baron Sankey CBE Lord Chancellor since 1929.

=== Baron ===
- Reginald Clifford Allen, Treasurer and Chairman of the Independent Labour Party, 1922–26. For political and public services.
- Lieutenant-Colonel the Right Honourable Wilfrid William Ashley JP DL MP Member of Parliament for Blackpool, 1906–18; for Fylde, 1918-22; and for New Forest and Christchurch since 1922. Parliamentary Secretary to the Ministry of Transport, 1922–23. Under-Secretary of State for War, 1923–24. Minister of Transport, November, 1924 to June, 1929. For political and public services.
- The Right Honourable Walter Edward Guinness DSO Member of Parliament for Bury St. Edmunds, August, 1907 to October, 1931. Under-Secretary of State for War, October, 1922. Financial Secretary to the Treasury, 1923 to January, 1924, and November, 1924 to November, 1925. Minister of Agriculture and Fisheries, November, 1925 to June, 1929. For political and public services.
- The Right Honourable Leifchild Stratten Jones. Member of Parliament for North Westmorland, 1905–10; for the Rushcliffe Division of Nottinghamshire, 1910–18; for the Camborne Division of Cornwall, 1923–24 and 1929–31. For political and public services.
- The Right Honourable Sir William Lowson Mitchell-Thomson Bt KBE MP Member of Parliament for North West Lanark, 1906–10; for North Down, 1910-18; for Maryhill, 1918–22, and for South Croydon since 1923. Parliamentary Secretary to the Ministry of Food, 1920–21, and to the Board of Trade, 1921–22. Postmaster General, 1924–29. For political and public services.

=== Privy Councillor ===
The King appointed the following to His Majesty's Most Honourable Privy Council:

- Major Walter Elliot Elliot MC MP Member of Parliament for Lanark, 1918–23, and for the Kelvingrove Division of Glasgow since 1924. Parliamentary Under-Secretary for Health for Scotland, 1923 to January, 1924, and November, 1924–26. Parliamentary Undersecretary of State for Scotland, 1926–29. Financial Secretary to the Treasury since August, 1931.
- Sir Thomas Walker Hobart Inskip CBE KC JP MP Member of Parliament for Central Bristol, 1918–29, and for the Fareham Division of Hampshire since February, 1931. Solicitor-General, November, 1922 to January, 1924, November, 1924 to March, 1928, and since August, 1931. Attorney-General, 1928–29.
- Colonel Sir Clive Wigram KCB KCVO CSI Private Secretary and Extra Equerry to His Majesty.

=== Baronetcies ===
- Percy Alfred Harris DL MP Member of Parliament for the Harborough Division of Leicestershire, 1916–18, and for South West Bethnal Green since 1922. Deputy Chairman of the London County Council, 1915–16, and still a member. For political and public services.
- Sir Harry Hope JP Member, of Parliament for Buteshire, 1910–18, for West Stirlingshire, 1918–22, and for Forfar, October, 1924 to October, 1931. President of the Scottish Chamber of Agriculture, 1908. For political and public services.
- Arthur Michael Samuel JP MP Member of Parliament for Farnham since 1918. Parliamentary Secretary, Department of Overseas Trade, 1924–27, and Financial Secretary to the Treasury, 1927 to 1929. For political and public services.

=== Knight Bachelor ===
- (Charles) Harold Bellman MBE Managing Director of the Abbey Road Building Society.
- Frederick Henry Berryman, Chairman of the Somerset County Council. Vice-Chairman of the Highways Committee of the County Councils Association.
- Bertram Okeden Bircham MC Solicitor to the Ministry of Labour.
- Charles Henry Blackmore CBE Secretary to the Cabinet of Northern Ireland. Private Secretary to the Prime Minister of Northern Ireland and Clerk of the Privy Council of Northern Ireland.
- George Buckston Browne FRCS FSA Purchased the house at Downe, Kent, where Charles Darwin lived, restored and endowed it and gave it to the British Association in custody for the nation. Has given very generous financial support to Medical Research work.
- Joseph Robert Cahill CMG Commercial Counsellor, His Majesty's Embassy, Paris.
- Henry Hallett Dale CBE FRS FRCP Director-in-Chief of the National Institute for Medical Research, Hampstead. Secretary of the Royal Society since 1925.
- William Darracott JP For political and public services in Kent.
- Patrick Geddes, Emeritus Professor of Botany, St. Andrew's University. Lately Bombay Government Professor of Sociology and Civics, University of Bombay. For services to education.
- William Clarke Hall, Metropolitan Police Court Magistrate, Old Street, and the Senior Magistrate of the Children's Courts in London.
- John Alexander Hammerton, Editor of the Universal Encyclopaedia, Universal History of the World, Peoples of All Nations, etc.
- Richard Hoyle Jackson JP Chairman of the Empire Cotton Growing Corporation. Chairman of Hoyle and Jackson, Limited, Cotton Spinners.
- Arthur Oldham Jennings MBE JP Registrar of the Brighton County Court and District Registry. President of the Association of County Court Registrars since 1920.
- Arthur Palmer Johnson, Lately Clerk to the Hampstead Metropolitan Borough Council. President of the National Association of Local Government Officers since 1924.
- James Knox JP Lord Lieutenant of the County of Lanark.
- Alfred David McAlpine JP For political and public services in North Wales.
- Thomas Wilson McAra JP Secretary to the Newspaper Proprietors Association, Limited.
- Major Patrick Bernard Malone JP Member of Parliament for the South Tottenham Division of Middlesex, 1918–23, and 1924–29. For political and public services.
- James Duncan Millar KC MP Member of Parliament for St Andrews Burghs, 1910; for North East Lanark, 1911–18; for East Fifeshire, 1922–24, and since 1929. For political and public services.
- James Milne CSI General Manager, Great Western Railway.
- Ernest William Morris CBE Until recently House Governor of the London Hospital.
- John FitzGerald Moylan CB CBE Receiver for the Metropolitan Police.
- Major Charles William Mackay Price JP Member of Parliament for Pembrokeshire, 1924–29. For political and public services.
- Ernest Darwin Simon, Member of Parliament for the Withington Division of Manchester 1923-24 and 1929–31. Parliamentary Secretary to the Ministry of Health in the first National Government. For political and public services.
- Halley Stewart JP Founder and Chairman of the Halley Stewart Trust Fund. For benefactions and social and public services.
- Henry Solomon Wellcome FSA Founder of the Wellcome Research Institution. Governing Director of the Wellcome Foundation. Founder of the Wellcome Tropical Research Laboratories, Khartoum. A generous supporter of Medical Research.
- Henry John Arthur Wilkins, President of the Co-operative Wholesale Society, Limited.
- Major Murdoch McKenzie Wood OBE MP Member of Parliament for Central Aberdeenshire 1919–24, and for Banffshire since 1929. Assistant Whip (unpaid) since September, 1931. For political and public services.

Diplomatic Service and Overseas List

- Benjamin Drage. For services in connection with the Imperial Institute and other public services.
- William George Toop Goodman MICE MIEE For public services to the State of South Australia.
- Major John Evelyn Leslie Wrench CMG Secretary of the Overseas League.

British India

- Lieutenant-Colonel Ralph Edwin Hotchkin Griffith CIE of the Political Department, Chief Commissioner and Agent to the Governor-General, North-West Frontier Province.
- Maulvi Rafiuddin Ahmed, Barrister-at-Law JP Minister for Education, Government of Bombay.
- James Cowlishaw Smith CIE Indian Civil Service, lately Member of the Executive Council of the Governor of the United Provinces.
- Justice John Robert Ellis Cunliffe, Puisne Judge of the High Court of Judicature at Rangoon, Burma.
- Justice Syed Wazir Hasan, Chief Judge, Chief Court of Oudh at Lucknow, United Provinces.
- Alfred Alan Lethbridge Parsons CIE Indian Civil Service, Financial Commissioner of Railways.
- Philip Henry Browne CBE Senior Partner, Messrs. Mackinnon Mackenzie & Co., Calcutta, Bengal.
- Muthiah David Devadoss, retired Judge of the High Court of Judicature, Madras.
- Robert Hill Macnair, Indian Civil Service, Judicial Commissioner, Central Provinces.
- Diwan Bahadur Alladi Krishnaswamy Iyer, Advocate-General, Madras.
- Lieutenant-Colonel Stanley Somerset Wreford Paddon CIE Director-General, India Store Department, London.
- Maharaja Sir Ejaz Rasul Khan CSI of Jahangirabad Raj, Barabanki District, United Provinces.
- Sardar Sahibzada Sultan Ahmad Khan, Political Member of Council, Gwalior State.
- Cursetji Nowroji Wadia CIE Mill owner, Bombay.
- William Gourley McKercher, Tea planter, Assam.
- Bepin Behari Ghose, lately Officiating Member of the Executive Council of the Governor of Bengal.

Colonies, Protectorates, etc.

- de Symons Montagu George Honey CMG Governor and Commander-in-Chief of the Colony of Seychelles.
- Don Baron Jayatilaka, Vice Chairman of the Board of Ministers and Leader of the State Council, Island of Ceylon.
- Arthur Selborne Jelf CMG Colonial Secretary, Jamaica.
- George Hunter Pickering, Chief Justice of Zanzibar.

=== The Most Honourable Order of the Bath ===
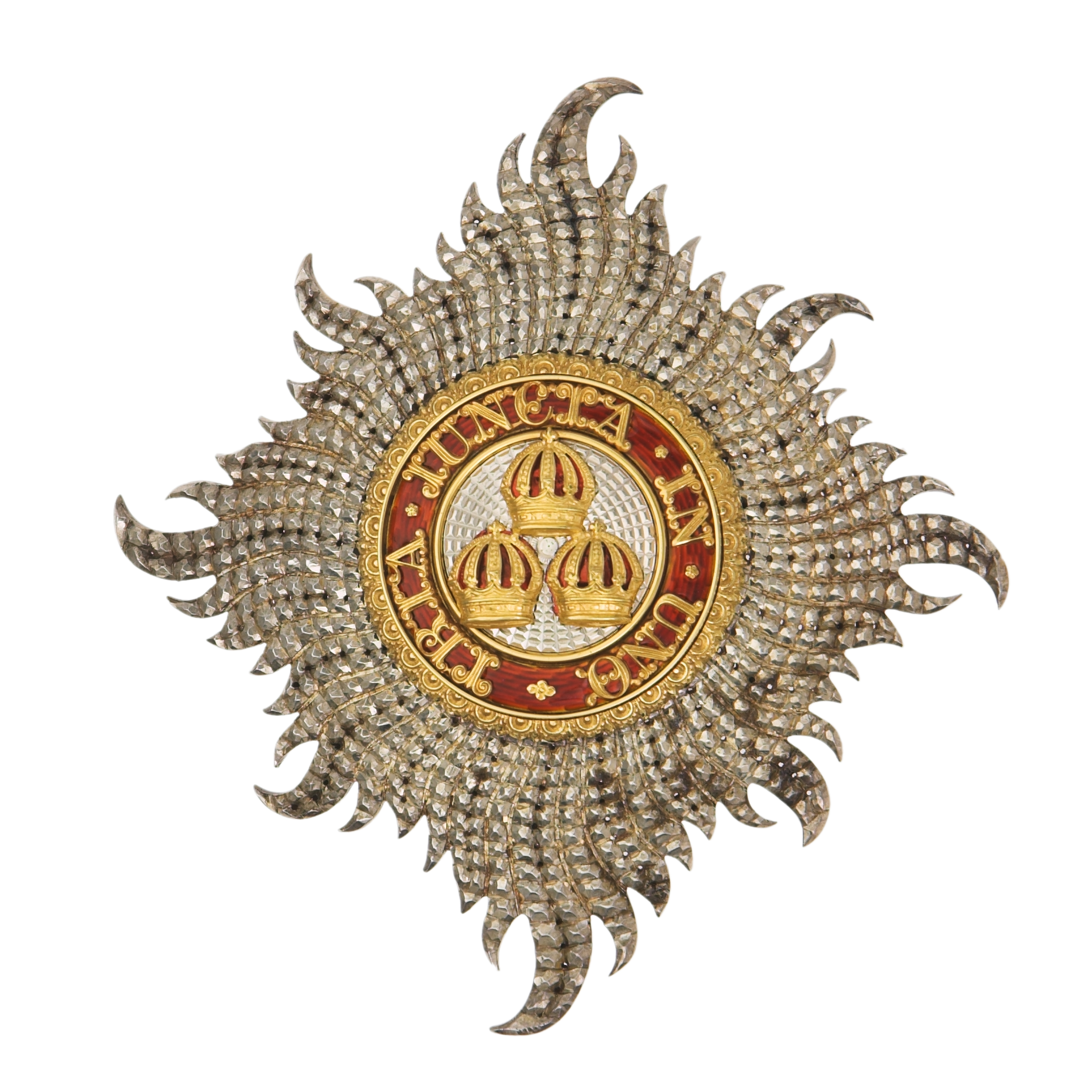
Civil star of the Knight Grand Cross of the Order of the Bath

==== Knight Commander of the Order of the Bath (KCB) ====
Military Division
Royal Navy

- Paymaster Rear-Admiral Henry Wilfred Eldon Manisty CB CMG

Army

- Lieutenant-General Sir John Theodosius Burnett-Stuart KBE CB CMG DSO (late The Rifle Brigade (Prince Consort's Own)), General Officer Commanding The British Troops in Egypt.
- Lieutenant-General James Ronald Edmonstone Charles CB CMG DSO (late Royal Engineers), Master-General of the Ordnance, The War Office.
- Major-General Edward Arthur Fagan CB CSI CMG DSO Retired Pay, late Indian Army. Formerly Commander, Rawalpindi District, India.

Civil Division

- The Honourable Sir Derek William George Keppel GCVO CMG CIE Master of His Majesty's Household and Extra Equerry since 1913.
- (Charles) Patrick Duff CB CVO Principal Private Secretary to the Prime Minister.
- Percy James Grigg, Chairman of the Board of Inland Revenue.
- Sir (Samuel) Findlater Stewart KCIE CSI Permanent Under-Secretary of State for India.

==== Companion of the Order of the Bath (CB) ====
Military Division
Royal Navy

- Rear-Admiral Edward Ratcliffe Garth Russell Evans CB DSO
- Colonel William Wellington Godfrey CMG RM

Army

- Major-General Geoffrey Weston Howard CMG DSO (late The Essex Regiment), Major-General in charge of Administration, Eastern Command.
- Major-General John Kennedy CMG DSO (late The Buffs (East Kent Regiment)). Formerly Commander, 6th (Lucknow) Infantry Brigade, India, now Half Pay List.
- Major-General Maurice Grove Taylor CMG DSO (late Royal Engineers). Formerly Commander, 166th (South Lancashire and Cheshire) Infantry Brigade, now Half Pay List.
- Major-General Sir James Lauderdale Gilbert Burnett of Leys Bt CMG DSO (late The Gordon Highlanders). Commander, 51st (Highland) Division.
- Colonel (temporary Brigadier) Jasper Baker CBE Royal Army Ordnance Corps. Inspector of Army Ordnance Services, The War Office.
- Colonel Bertie Harry Waters-Taylor CBE (late The Prince of Wales's Volunteers (South Lancashire)). Formerly Assistant Quarter-Master-General The British Troops in Egypt, now Retired Pay.
- Major-General Wilkinson Dent CBE DSO Indian Army. Formerly Commander, 5th (Quetta) Infantry Brigade, India, now Unemployed List.
- Colonel (temporary Brigadier) Donald Elphinston Robertson DSO Indian Army. Commander, 8th (Bareilly) Infantry Brigade, India.
- Colonel (temporary Brigadier) Francis Esmond Wingate Venning CBE DSO Indian Army. Commander, Multan Brigade, India.
- Colonel (temporary Brigadier) Arthur Mordaunt Mills DSO Indian Army. Commander, Razmak Brigade, India.

Royal Air Force

- Air Commodore Wilfrid Rhodes Freeman DSO MC

Civil Division

- Colonel John Bickerton McKaig DSO TD ADC Territorial Army.
- Colonel Geoffrey Ronald Codrington DSO OBE TD Territorial Army.
- Honorary Colonel Walter Charles Horsley VD TD Honorary Colonel 28th London Regiment (Artists Rifles).
- Frederic William Charles Dean CBE MIMechE , late Superintendent of the Royal Gun and Carriage Factories, Royal Ordnance Factories.
- The Venerable Archdeacon Walter Kenrick Knight-Adkin OBE RN
- Henry Grattan Bushe CMG Legal Adviser to the Dominions Office and the Colonial Office.
- Gilbert Francis Montriou Campion, Clerk Assistant, House of Commons.
- William Christian, Accountant and Comptroller General of the Customs and Excise.
- Arthur Locke CBE Assistant Secretary, Home Office.
- William Aberdein Middleton OBE Chief Auditor and Secretary, National Insurance Audit Department.

=== The Most Exalted Order of the Star of India ===
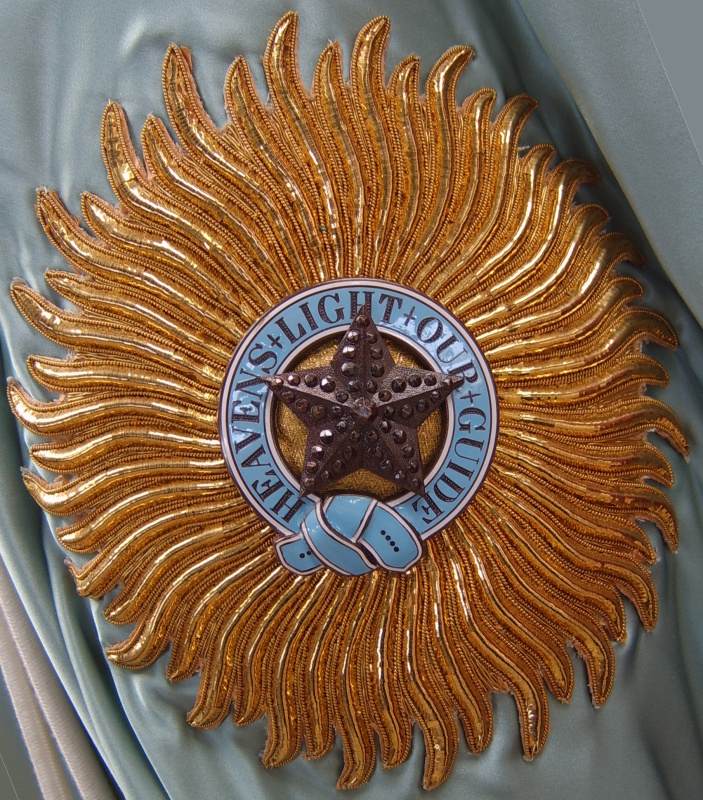
Star of a Knight Grand Commander of the Most Exalted Order of the Star of India.

==== Knight Grand Commander (GCSI) ====
- The Right Honourable William Robert Wellesley, Earl Peel GBE

==== Knight Commander (KCSI) ====
- Sir Brojendra Lal Mitter, Law Member of the Governor-General's Executive Council.
- His Highness Maharaja Mahendra Sir Yadvendra Singh Bahadur KCIE Maharaja of Panna, Central India.
- Major His Highness Raja Narendra Shah CSI Raja of Tehri (Garhwal), United Provinces.
- Sir John Perronet Thompson KCIE CSI Chief Commissioner of Delhi.
- Major-General Sir Leonard Rogers CIE Indian Medical Service (retired), President, India Office Medical Board.

==== Companion (CSI) ====
- Lieutenant-Colonel George Drummond Ogilvie CIE Agent to the Governor-General in Central India.
- John Armstrong Shillidy, Indian Civil Service, Secretary to the Government of India in the Department of Industries and Labour.
- Robert Duncan Bell CIE Indian Civil Service, Chief Secretary to the Government of Bombay in the Revenue Department.
- John Tarlton Whitty CIE Indian Civil Service, Member of the Governor's Executive Council, Bihar and Orissa.
- Henry George Walton, Indian Civil Service, Commissioner, United Provinces.
- Hyde Clarendon Gowan CIE VD Indian Civil Service, Chief Secretary to the Government of the Central Provinces.
- Sir George Anderson CIE Indian Educational Service (retired), lately Director of Public Instruction, Punjab.
- Colonel John Philip Cameron CIE Indian Medical Service, lately Inspector-General of Prisons, Madras.

=== The Most Distinguished Order of Saint Michael and Saint George ===
Star of the Order of Saint Michael and Saint George.

==== Knight Grand Cross of the Order of St Michael and St George (GCMG) ====
- Lieutenant-Colonel Sir Francis Henry Humphrys GCVO KCMG KBE CIE High Commissioner and Commander-in-Chief, Iraq.

==== Knight Commander of the Order of St Michael and St George (KCMG) ====
- Stephen George Tallents CB CMG CBE Secretary of the Empire Marketing Board.
- Sir Thomas Alexander Vans Best KBE CMG Governor and Commander-in-Chief of the Windward Islands.
- Arnold Wienholt Hodson CMG Governor and Commander-in-Chief of the Colony of Sierra Leone.
- Sir James Kingston Fowler KCVO CMG Member of the Colonial Advisory Medical Committee.
- Nevile Meyrick Henderson CMG His Majesty's Envoy Extraordinary and Minister Plenipotentiary at Belgrade.
- Harold Alfred MacMichael CMG DSO Civil Secretary to the Sudan Government.

==== Companion of the Order of St Michael and St George (CMG) ====
- Major Henry Francis Chettle OBE Director of Records, Imperial War Graves Commission.
- Lieutenant-Colonel Ernest Tristram Crutchley CBE Representative in the Commonwealth of Australia of His Majesty's Government in the United Kingdom of Great Britain and Northern Ireland.
- James Walker-Davidson Commissioner; for Railways, State of Queensland.
- Charles William Dixon OBE Assistant Secretary, Dominions Office.
- Crawfurd Wilfred Griffin Eady, Principal Assistant Secretary, Ministry of Labour.
- Charles Fernand Rey, Resident Commissioner, Bechuanaland Protectorate.
- Edwin John Butler CIE FRS Director of the Imperial Mycological Institute.
- Douglas James Jardine. OBE Chief Secretary to the Government, Tanganyika Territory.
- Harry Scott Newlands, Chief Commissioner of Ashanti, Gold Coast.
- Percy Wilbraham Perryman OBE Chief Secretary to the Government, Uganda Protectorate.
- Henry Guy Pilling, Colonial Secretary, British Honduras.
- Ronald Ian Campbell, Counsellor in His Majesty's High Commission at Cairo.
- Arthur Ernest Eastes, one of His Majesty's Consuls-General in China.
- Edward Gascoigne Hogg, lately Technical Expert, Ministry of Finance, Egypt.
- Charles Howard Smith, Counsellor in the Foreign Office.
- John Walter Francis Thelwall MC Commercial Counsellor at His Majesty's Embassy in Berlin.

=== Order of the Indian Empire ===
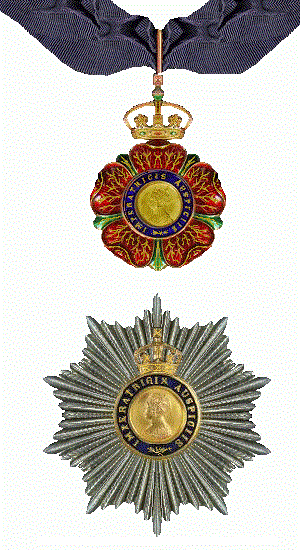
Riband, badge and star of the Knight Grand Commander of the Order of the Indian Empire

==== Knight Grand Commander (GCIE) ====
- His Highness Maharajadhiraja Maharaja Sir Sarup Ram Singh Bahadur KCSI Maharao of Sirohi, Rajputana.
- Major His Highness Nawab Sir Taley Mohammed Khan KCIE KCVO Nawab of Palanpur, Western India States.

==== Knight Commander (KCIE) ====
- Archibald Young Gibbs Campbell CSI CIE CBE VD Indian Civil Service, Member of the Executive Council of the Governor of Madras.
- Evelyn Berkeley Howell CSI CIE of the Political Department, Foreign Secretary to the Government of India in the Foreign and Political Department.
- Sir Osborne Arkell Smith, Managing Governor, Imperial Bank of India, Calcutta.

==== Companion (CIE) ====
- Satish Chandra Gupta, Barrister-at-Law, Secretary to the Government of India in the Legislative Assembly Department.
- Kenneth Samuel Fitze, of the Political Department, Officer on Special Duty at the Round Table Conference on behalf of the Political Department.
- Bijay Kumar Basu, Solicitor, High Court, Calcutta, Bengal.
- Ernest Ferdinand Oppenheim, Indian Civil Service, Commissioner, United Provinces.
- Dugald Stuart Burn, Agent, Great Indian Peninsula Railway, Bombay.
- Ghazanfar Ali Khan OBE Indian Civil Service, Commissioner, Nagpur Division, Central Provinces.
- Harold Graham, Indian Civil Service, Officiating Commissioner, Dacca Division, Bengal.
- Frank Burton Leach, Indian Civil Service, Chief Secretary to the Government of Burma.
- Lieutenant-Colonel Sherman Gordon Venn Ellis DSO Indian Army, Military Accountant-General.
- Harold Argyll Watson, Indian Civil Service, lately Secretary to the Government of Madras in the Finance Department.
- Henry Abraham Gubbay, Chief Engineer and Secretary to the Government of Bihar and Orissa in the Roads and Buildings Branch.
- Alfred Ernest Mathias, Indian Civil Service, President of the Indian Tariff Board.
- John Pierson Bulkeley, Indian Educational Service, Director of Public Instruction, Burma.
- Allan Arbuthnot Lane Roberts, Indian Civil Service, Deputy Commissioner, Punjab.
- John William Smyth, Indian Civil Service, Collector of Bombay.
- Olaf Kirkpatrick Caroe, of the Political Department, Deputy Commissioner, Peshawar, North-West Frontier Province.
- Khan Bahadur Jamshedji Bajanji Vachha, Commissioner of Income Tax, Bombay Presidency.
- Satyendra Nath Roy, Indian Civil Service, Deputy Secretary to the Government of India in the Home Department.
- Arthur Beatson Reid, Indian Civil Service, Deputy Secretary to the Government of India in the Department of Education, Health and Lands.
- Thomas James Young Roxburgh, Indian Civil Service, District and Sessions Judge, Chief Presidency Magistrate, Bengal.
- Lieutenant-Colonel John Morison Indian Medical Service, Director of the King Edward VII Pasteur Institute and Medical Research Institute, Shillong, Assam.
- Theodore James Tasker OBE Indian Civil Service, Director-General and Secretary, Revenue Department (Acting Revenue Member), His Exalted Highness the Nizam's Government, Hyderabad, Deccan.
- Engineer Captain William Arthur Williams, Royal Indian Marine, Manager of the Government Dockyard, Bombay.
- Norman Lindsay Sheldon FIC Chief Inspector of Explosives in India.
- Pherozeshah Jehangir Marzban JP Sheriff of Bombay, and Editor of the Jam-e-Jamshed, Bombay.
- Edward Charles Stuart Baker OBE Indian Police Service (retired).
- Khan Bahadur Saiyid Ahmad Hasan, Chief Secretary, Benares State, United Provinces.

=== The Royal Victorian Order ===
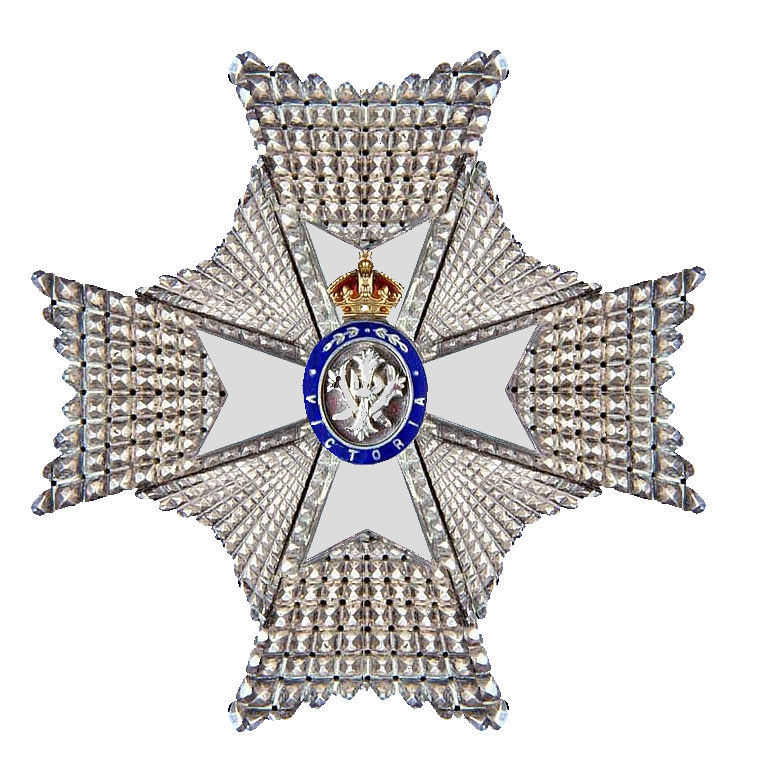
Insignia of a Knight / Dames Commander of the Royal Victorian Order

==== Knight Grand Cross of the Royal Victorian Order (GCVO) ====
- Commander George Louis Victor Henry Serge, Marquess of Milford Haven KCVO RN
- Major-General Simon Joseph, Baron Lovat KT KCMG KCVO CB DSO (Retired).
- Captain Sir Bryan Godfrey Godfrey-Faussett KCVO CMG RN (Retired).

==== Knight Commander of the Royal Victorian Order (KCVO) ====
- The Very Reverend Albert Victor Baillie CVO
- The Honourable Hew Hamilton Dalrymple
- Sir Malcolm Delevingne KCB
- Major-General Charles Edward Corkran CB CMG
- Lieutenant-Colonel Sir Cecil Bingham Levita (Retired) CBE MVO
- John Weir CVO

==== Commander of the Royal Victorian Order (CVO) ====
- Sir (Henry) Walford Davies OBE
- Alban Tabor Austin Dobson CBE
- Marcus Antonius Johnston de Lavis-Trafford MVO OBE
- Harold Graham Vincent.

==== Member of the Royal Victorian Order, 4th class (MVO) ====
- Norman Richard Combe Warwick OBE
- Colin Smith OBE
- Commander Edward Conyngham Denison RN (dated 10 August 1931).
- Lieutenant Commander Leonard Albert William Johnson RN (dated 10 August 1931).

==== Member of the Royal Victorian Order, 5th class (MVO) ====
- Lawrence Edward Tanner FSA

=== The Most Excellent Order of the British Empire ===
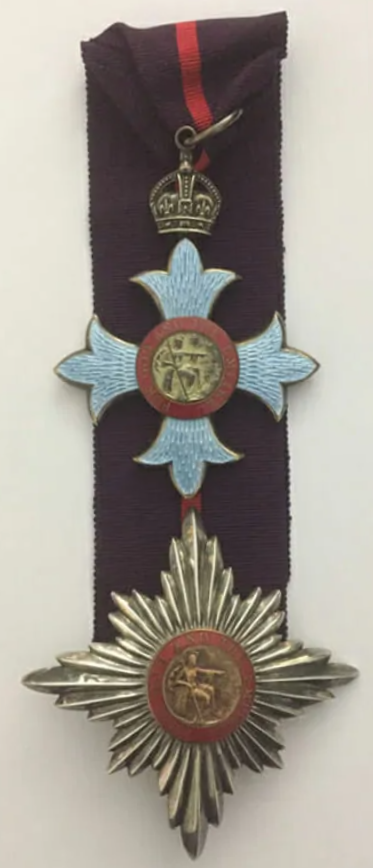
Knight Commander of the Order of the British Empire, insignia 1917–35

==== Dame Grand Cross of the Order of the British Empire (GBE) ====
- Annie, Dowager Viscountess Cowdray. In recognition of her numerous benefactions, particularly in connection with hospitals and the nursing profession.

==== Dame Commander of the Order of the British Empire (DBE) ====
- Margaret Janson Tuke Late Principal, Bedford College for Women.
- Edith Mary Brown LRCP Principal Women's Hospital and Christian Medical College, Ludhiana, Punjab.

Honorary Dame Commander

- Her Majesty Queen Salote Tubou, Queen of Tonga.

==== Knight Commander of the Order of the British Empire (KBE) ====
Civil Division

- Augustus Moore Daniel Director of the National Gallery.
- Frederick Norton Kay Menzies FRCPE FRSE Chief Medical Officer of the London County Council.

Diplomatic Service and Overseas List

- Frederick William Maze, Inspector General of Chinese Maritime Customs.

Colonies, Protectorates, etc.

- Walter James Young CBE Chairman of the State Advisory Committee on Public Finances, 1930–1931, State of South Australia. For public services to that State.
- John Scott CMG Colonial Secretary, Straits Settlements.

==== Commander of the Order of the British Empire (CBE) ====
Civil Division

- Frederick John Alban, General Secretary and Comptroller, King Edward VII Welsh National Memorial Association.
- Harriette Chick A distinguished scientific worker in bacteriology and biochemistry. For services to the Medical Research Council in connection with research on vitamins and the science of nutrition. A member of the staff of the Lister Institute.
- Captain Thomas Harvey JP DL Chairman of the Falkirk Local Employment Committee. Chairman of the Stirlingshire County Council. Honorary Secretary of the Lord Roberts Memorial Workshops in Scotland.
- Herbert Henry Humphries MInstCE City Engineer and Surveyor, Birmingham.
- Lieutenant-Colonel Herbert Patrick Hunter OBE DL Chief Constable of Staffordshire.
- Joseph Jones JP General Secretary of the Yorkshire Mine Workers Association since 1924;. For political and public services.
- George Kenneth Menzies, Secretary to the Royal Society of Arts.
- Lieutenant-Colonel John Malcolm Mitchell OBE MC Secretary, Carnegie United Kingdom Trust.
- Reginald Joseph Mitchell AMICE FRAeS Director and Chief Designer, Supermarine Aviation Works (Vickers) Limited. For services in connection with the Schneider Trophy Contest.
- Harold Moore OBE FIC FInstP Director of Metallurgical Research, War Office.
- Enoch Morrell JP President of the South Wales Miners' Federation.
- Annie McWillie Peterkin. Superintendent of the Queen's Institute of District Nursing.
- Hugh Douglas Roberts, Inspector of Audit for Northern England, Ministry of Health.
- George Leighton Seager, Ex-Chairman of the Cardiff and Bristol Channel Shipowners Association. For public services.
- Marshall King Smith OBE Secretary of Trinity House.
- Henry Edward Stilgoe MInstCE Chief Engineer, Metropolitan Water Board.
- Hubert Digby Watson CIE Treasurer of the Save the Children Fund.
- Charles Weatherill, Assistant Secretary and Acting Deputy Secretary, Department of Agriculture for Scotland.

Diplomatic Service and Overseas List

- Robert Edward Hartwell Baily OBE Governor of Kassala Province, Sudan.
- Julius Basil Browne, Majesty's Consul at Madeira.
- Richard Massie Graves. Assistant Director-General, European Departments Egyptian Ministry of the Interior.

British India

- Frederick Douglas Bartley, Indian Police Service, Deputy Commissioner of Police, Calcutta, Bengal.
- Raymond Eustace Grant Govan, of Messrs. Govan Bros., Merchants, Delhi.

Colonies, Protectorates, etc.

- William Ball Slade. For services to agriculture and for other public and philanthropic services in the State of Queensland.
- Ralph Stuart Bond, Honorary Treasurer of the Royal Empire Society.
- George Vickery Owen Bulkeley, Port Manager at Kilindini, Kenya.
- Major Thomas John Hallinan OBE Inspector-General of Health Services, Ministry of the Interior, Iraq.
- Major William Hudson OBE MC Postmaster-General, Palestine.
- Victor Alexander Lowinger, Surveyor-General, Straits Settlements and Federated Malay States.
- James Moffat Thomson, Secretary for Native Affairs, Northern Rhodesia.

==== Officer of the Order of the British Empire (OBE) ====
Military Division
Royal Navy

- Paymaster Captain Robert Townsend Johnson RN (Retired).
- Commander John Duncan Campbell DSC RN (Retired).
- Chaplain and Instructor-Commander William Henry Goudge RN
- Surgeon Lieutenant-Commander (D) Andrew Lawrey RN
- Captain Peter Archibald Murchie RD RNR

Army

- Major John Reginald Manning Cave VD Barbados Volunteer Force.
- Captain (local Major) John McAdam Cunningham MC The Gordon Highlanders, Officer Commanding 4th (Uganda) Battalion, The King's African Rifles.
- Lieutenant-Colonel Guy Muloch Pilkington Hornidge MC VD Officer Commanding State Troops, Perak, Federated Malay States Volunteer Force.
- Captain Thomas Kerr MC The Argyll and Sutherland Highlanders (Princess Louise's), Attached Sudan Defence Force.
- Major (Commissary) Robert Mackie, Retired List, late Indian Corps of Clerks (British Wing), late Chief Clerk, Headquarters, Southern Command, Poona, India.

Civil Division

- John Allcock, Treasurer and Controller, Cardiff.
- William Joseph Allen, Commercial Manager, Naval Canteen Service, Navy, Army and Air Force Institutes.
- Hilda Elizabeth Blattner. Assistant Editor of the Publications of the Empire Parliamentary Association.
- George Brander, procurator Fiscal of Fifeshire.
- Herbert William Bromby, Deputy Chief Inspector (Insurance), Ministry of Health.
- James Robinson Bull, Principal Clerk, Companies (Winding Up) Department, Supreme Court of Judicature.
- Frederick Charles Bunn, Establishment Officer, Ministry of Transport.
- Arthur Frederick Travers Campbell, Superintending Executive Officer, India Office.
- Frederick. William Cary, Expense Accounts Officer, H.M. Dockyard, Portsmouth.
- Captain Bertram Sydney Cohen MIEE FInstP Staff Engineer, Research Section, General Post Office.
- Thomas William Condon, Joint Chairman of the Port of London Registration Committee.
- Robert Martin.Cowley, President of the National Federation of Retail. Fruiterers, Florists and Fishmongers. A member of the Horticultural Advisory Council and the National Mark Fruit Trade Committee of the Ministry of Agriculture and Fisheries.
- Frederick Davey Late Director of Accounts, Ministry of Labour.
- Idris Davies JP Chairman of the Brecon County Council of the District Education Committee and of the County School Governors. Secretary of the Breconshire Association of Friendly Societies since 1912, First Chairman of the Brecon and Radnor Divisional Labour Party. For political and public services.
- Margaret Bridget Duffey. (Sister Mary Immaculate, C.P.) Principal of St. Joseph's College, Bradford.
- Jeannie Lillie Gibbin JP For many years a Poor Law Guardian in Newcastle upon Tyne. A member of the City Council.
- Frederick John Harwood Accountant, War Office.
- Thomas Galway Houston JP For forty-seven years Head-Master of Coleraine Academical Institution. A Senator of Queen's University, Belfast.
- Cicely Howland. Clerk in His Majesty's Private Secretary's Office.
- John Patrick Kelly, Deputy Chief Inspector, Board of Customs and Excise.
- George Ernest Kendall MBE FRIBA Architect to the Board of Education.
- Claude Reynolds Leak ISO Principal, Ministry of Pensions.
- Captain Harold Bowerman Pope. Principal Officer, Mercantile Marine Survey Service, Board of Trade.
- Alpheus Smith, Senior Inspector of Taxes, Board of Inland Revenue.
- Colonel Joseph Spain TD FRIBA Valuation Officer, West Riding County Council.
- Benjamin Waite District Manager, Post Office Telephones, South Wales District, General Post Office.
- George Walker Smith Walker, Deputy Commandant of the City of Aberdeen Special Constabulary.
- Arthur Harold Ward, Inspector of Official Receivers in Bankruptcy, Board of Trade.
- Arthur Whitley, Finance Officer, Home Office.
- Robert Rolfe Williams, Director of Education, Rhondda Local Education Authority.

Diplomatic Service and Overseas List

- Leonard Bennett Bayley MBE Superintendent of the Line, Sudan Government Railways.
- Herbert Winterbotham Holmden, President of the British Chamber of Commerce at Valparaiso.
- Major Charles Wilberforce Maclean DSO His Majesty's Consul at Florence.
- The Reverend George Elderkin Mooney MBE Honorary Chaplain to His Majesty's Legation at Oslo.

Colonies, Protectorates, etc.

- Florence Chatfield, Superintendent of the Diamantina Hospital for Chronic Diseases, State of Queensland.
- Arthur Albert Jones, Member of the Retail Grocers Advisory Sub-Committee of the Empire Marketing Board.
- Rose Stephens, For public and philanthropic services in the State of Tasmania.
- John Glover-Addo Lately Municipal Member for Accra, Legislative Council of the Gold Coast Colony. For public services.
- Charles Cuthbert Aston, Administrative Inspector, Ministry of the Interior, Iraq.
- Thomas Edwin Percival Baynes, Treasurer, Dominica, Leeward Islands.
- Commander Henry Biron RD RNR (Retired), Captain of the Port, Gibraltar.
- Matthew Fortescue Brickdale. For services in the relief of sufferers from the recent hurricane in Mauritius.
- Katharine Cook MBE For social welfare services in the Uganda Protectorate.
- Frans Robert Dragten KC For services in connection with the recent hurricane in British Honduras.
- Arthur Harker For services to the Committee for Research in the Dependencies of the Falkland Islands (Discovery Committee).
- Lieutenant-Colonel Oscar Charles Heidenstam, Inspector-General of Police and Commandant of Local Forces, Barbados.
- Ethelbert Bernard Hosking, District Officer, Kenya.
- Francis Alexander Innes West African Medical Staff, Medical Officer of Health, Gambia.
- Alec Seath Kirkbride MC Assistant British Resident, Trans-Jordan.
- Robert Brown Mackie, Comptroller of Customs, Sierra Leone.
- Charles Henry Joseph Sheppard MBE Assistant Commandant of Police, Somaliland Protectorate. For services as Inspector of Police, Ministry of the Interior, Iraq.
- Percy Claude Wight, Mayor of Georgetown and Member of the Legislative Council of British Guiana. For public services.
- Robert Withycombe MBE Director, Electricity Department, Zanzibar.
- Austin Woodeson FRIBA Chief Architect, Public Works Department, Ceylon.

British India

- Francis Hubert du Heaume, Indian Police Service, District Officer, Frontier Constabulary, North West Frontier Province.
- George Freeman Murray Forbes MC Indian Police Service, Officiating District Superintendent of Police, Madras.
- Lieutenant-Colonel Khan Bahadur Dinshah Dosabhai Khambata VD Honorary Magistrate, Poona, Bombay.
- Captain Lewis Eric MacGregor, 10/12th Frontier Force Regiment, Assistant Commandant, Burma Military Police, Burma.
- Stanley Desmond Rieley MRCS Indian Medical Department, Superintendent, Central Jail, Mach, Baluchistan.
- Major Douglas Gordon Pigou Mansel Shewen, Indian Army, Private Secretary to the Governor of Assam.

==== Member of the Order of the British Empire (MBE) ====
Military Division
Royal Navy

- Electrical Lieutenant-Commander George William Hows RN
- Paymaster Lieutenant (W) William Chapman Greet MSM RN
- Commissioned Mechanician Abraham Davidson RN

Army

- Captain Keith Ernest Burton, Officer Commanding, Dominica Defence Force, Leeward Islands.

Civil Division

- Ernest Charles Adams, Senior Executive Officer, Export Credits Guarantee Department.
- Herbert Harry Adams Senior Accounts Officer (acting), Air Ministry.
- Joseph Steven Andrews Senior Intelligence Officer, Department of Overseas Trade.
- Herbert Bassett, Superintendent; Coventry City Police.
- William Newton Booth AMICE MIMechE Assistant Mechanical Engineer, Royal Ordnance Factories, Woolwich.
- Ella Agnes-Mary Bowen. Chairman of the Children's Sub-Committee of the Paddington and St. Marylebone War Pensions Committee.
- Cecil Tom Browne, Senior Staff Officer Patent Office, Board of Trade.
- David John Charles, First Class Officer, Ministry of Labour.
- William Fellowes Corby, Clerk to the Raunds Urban District Council.
- Walter Wallace Daniel Dale MIMechE Engineering Assistant to the Director of Dockyards, Admiralty.
- James Davies, Superintendent, Glamorgan County Constabulary.
- John Richard Dodd, Chief Superintendent of Constabulary and Deputy Chief Constable of Cheshire.
- Major Hubert Housby Dryland. Clerk and Steward, North Riding Mental Hospital, York.
- George Elmslie, Staff Officer (Taxes), Board of Inland Revenue.
- James Fogg, Juvenile Employment Officer under the Liverpool Education Authority.
- Ethel Forman, Chairman of the Children's Sub-Committee of the Nottingham and District War Pensions Committee.
- Ellen Elizabeth Gardner. Matron of the Durham County Mental Hospital.
- Winifred Aspinall Given. Lately Directress of the Clinic at Singapore for the wives and families of Asiatic workmen.
- Frank Goldsworthy, Civil Assistant to the Medical Director General of the Navy.
- Francis Edward Gordon, Lately Waterguard Superintendent, First Class, Board of Customs and Excise.
- Mary Caroline Gorham. For many years Organising Secretary of the Duxhurst Homes for Inebriate Women and the Home for Children at Duxhurst. A devoted worker among the poor of Tonbridge.
- Edward Arthur Grenfell, Headmaster of the Devon and Exeter Central School for boys.
- Isabel Hayward, Children's Officer, Special Grants Committee, Ministry of Pensions.
- Christopher Lawrence Hicks, Superintendent, Metropolitan Police.
- Herbert Hinton, Second Class Clerk, Central Office, Royal Courts of Justice.
- John James Jackson, Superintendent of Stores, Board of Customs and Excise.
- Edith Murray Keate. Lately Assistant in the Naval Branch, Historical Section, Committee of Imperial Defence.
- Eva Fanny King, Higher Clerical Officer, India Office.
- Donald Macadie, Staff Officer, Stores Department, General Post Office.
- John Macdonald, Pipe Major. In recognition of his services to piping in Scotland.
- Elsie Jane Mair. Lately teacher in the Portknockie Public School, Banffshire.
- Albert Miller, Head of Section, H.M. Office of Works.
- George Morgan, Grade II Superintending Clerk, Supply Reserve Depot, War Office.
- James Latimer Morgan, Senior Staff Officer, Ministry of Agriculture and Fisheries.
- Thomas Henry Morrow, Higher Clerical Officer, Board of Inland Revenue.
- Arthur William Moss, Higher Executive Officer, Ministry of Pensions.
- George Robert Nicholls, Superintendent, Criminal Investigation Department, Metropolitan Police.
- Mildred Nicoll. Confidential Shorthand writer to the Secretary-of-State for War.
- Adelina O'Hara. Clerk, Empire Forestry Association.
- John Low Palmer, Higher Clerical Officer, Ministry of Transport.
- Herbert Polman, Staff Officer, Ministry of Health.
- John Raffan JP Chairman of the Stirling & Clackmannan War Pensions Committee.
- Annice Jane Richardson. Matron at the Warneford, Oxford, Mental Hospital.
- Major Andrew Robbie VD JP Superintendent, City of Edinburgh Special Constabulary.
- William Charles Roberts, Staff Officer, H.M. Treasury.
- Major Andrew Rugg VD JP Clerk in the Sheriff Clerk Service at Wick.
- Euphemia Maria Russell (Sister Mary Agnes). A Sister of Mercy in the Providence (Row) Night Refuge and Home. Formerly Head Mistress of the Catholic School, Crispin Street.
- William George Ryde, Staff Officer, H.M. Office of Works.
- Ida Samuel JP Chairman of tte Stepney Juvenile Advisory Committee.
- John Frederick Randall Stainer, Chief Examiner, Passport. Department, Foreign Office.
- William John Steward, Manager of the Ministry of Labour Training Centre at Clay-don, Suffolk.
- Harriet Louisa Tilney. Headmistress of the Cromer Infants School.
- John Thomas Watkins. Vice-Chairman of the Manchester Local Employment Committee.
- Alderman Frederick John Welch JP Chairman of the Westminster, Kensington and Chelsea War Pensions Committee.
- Jane Young Wilson. Clerical Officer, Office of H.M. Divisional. Inspector of Mines, Edinburgh.
- Elizabeth Winfield. Headmistress of the Kirkstall Road Council Girls School, Leeds. A past President of the National Association of Head Teachers.

Diplomatic Service and Overseas List

- Cecil Albert Brittlebank, British Vice-Consul at Essen.
- Alfred Thomas Cox, Archivist at His Majesty's Legation at Peking.
- Lieutenant-Colonel Francis Reginald Hull, formerly British Vice Consul at Ilheus.
- Alexander Stanley Nolan, British Vice-Consul at Rosario.
- David James Ross, Assistant Controller of the Sudan Postal Service.
- Sidney Simmonds, Commercial Secretary, Grade III, at His Majesty's Embassy at Moscow.
- Harold William Speck, Archivist at His Majesty's Legation at Lima.
- Frederick Wakeham, British Consular Agent at Beni Suef.

Colonies, Protectorates, etc.

- Thomas Edward Metcalfe, Member of the Retail Fruiterers Advisory Sub-Committee of the Empire Marketing Board.
- Dora Alice Parr. For services in connection with the entertainment of oversea visitors.
- Emily Bond, Matron, General Hospital, Colombo, Ceylon.
- Cecil John Colvin, Assistant Engineer, Irrigation, Ministry of Economics and Communications, Iraq.
- John Concannon, lately Senior Prison Superintendent, Gold Coast.
- Mathew Costelloe, lately Detective Inspector of Constabulary, Colony of Trinidad and Tobago.
- Ann Katherine Creasy. For social welfare services in Hong Kong.
- Hubert Augustus Davis, lately Superintendent, Leper Asylum, Barbados.
- Joseph Augustus de Suze. For services to education in the Colony of Trinidad and Tobago.
- Oriel St. Arnaud Duke MM Inspector of Police, Dominica, Leeward Islands.
- Seewoosunkur Ghoorun, Inspector of Police, Mauritius.
- Thomas Hamilton, Officer-in-Charge, Criminal Investigation Department, Northern Rhodesia.
- Elizabeth Letitia Kemsley, Senior Health Visitor, Tanganyika Territory.
- John Edward Lesslar, lately Senior Deputy Pathologist, Institute for Medical Research, Federated Malay States.
- Charles Feebor Loxley, Nominated Unofficial Member of the Legislative Council of Sierra Leone. For public services.
- Monrad Sigfrid Metzgen, Internal Revenue Officer, British Honduras. For services in connection with the recent hurricane.
- John Beaumont Darnley Osbourne, Chief Clerk, Treasury, Saint Lucia, Windward Islands.
- George Percy Osmond. For services in connection with the repatriation of distressed West Indians.
- Marian Frances Brutton Tyrrell. For social welfare services in Ceylon.
- Ethel Weaver, Matron, Cunningham Hospital, Saint Christopher and Nevis, Leeward Islands.

British India

- Behram Dinshaw Asli, Indian Trade Publicity Officer, London.
- M. R., Ry. Rao Bahadur Nandanur Harihara Ayyar Jagadisa Ayyar Avargal, Madras Police Service, Deputy Superintendent of Police, Madras.
- Babu Kanai Lai Banerjee, Zamindar, Telinipara, Honorary Magistrate, Serampore Bench, and Vice-Chairman, Bhadreswar Municipality, Bengal.
- Khan Bahadur Maulvi Abdul Ghana, Advocate, Karnal, Punjab.
- Frederic Harding, Cabinet Maker; Central Public Works Department, New Delhi.
- William Larner, Indian State Railways, Station Master, Mach, North-Western Railway, Baluchistan.
- Cecil George Murphy, United Provinces Police Service, Deputy Superintendent of Police, Criminal Investigation Department, Special Branch, United Provinces.
- Alexander Edward Simpson, Indian Customs Department, Calcutta, Bengal.
- Frank Spencer, Officer Supervisor, General Staff Branch, Army Headquarters.
- John Stephen Wiltshire, Sub-divisional Officer, Myahaung, Henzada District, Burma.

Honorary Members

- Sheikh Hussam Eddin Jarallah, Inspector of Education, Palestine.

=== Members of the Order of the Companions of Honour (CH) ===
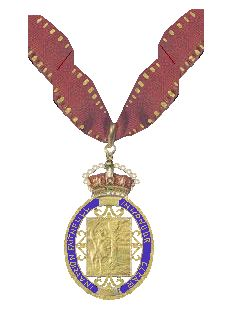
The riband and badge of the "Companions of Honour"

- John Buchan MP For public, educational and literary services.

=== Kaisar-i-Hind Medal ===
First Class

- The Right Honourable John Henry Whitley JP late Chairman of the Royal Commission on Labour in India.
- Margaret Georgina Arbuthnot, Secretary of the Society for the Protection of Children in India, Bengal.
- Deaconess Beatrice Creighton, Madras.
- Ellen Jane Cullen, Hathras, United Provinces.
- Jessie Phandora Simpson, Lady Superintendent, Good Samaritan Hospital, Jhelum, Punjab.
- Louisa Wathen, Honorary Secretary, Indian Red Cross Society, Provincial Branch, Madras.
- Thyra Weir, wife of Lieutenant-Colonel J. L. R. Weir, Political Officer in Sikkim.
- Evelyn James Bunbury MC JP General Manager of Messrs. Forbes, Forbes, Campbell and Company Limited, Bombay.
- The Reverend Joseph Ferguson McFadyen lately Vice-Chancellor, Nagpur University, Central Provinces.
- William Nunan Police Surgeon and Professor of Medical Jurisprudence, Grant Medical College, Bombay.
- The Reverend Father Auguste Sellos, Roman Catholic Missionary, Burma.

=== British Empire Medal (BEM) ===
Military Division
For Meritorious Service

- Sol Talim (Sergeant-Major) Gebraski Kedanb, Eastern Arab Corps, Sudan Defence Force.
- Bash Shawish (Company Sergeant-Major) Ali Hassan, Camel Corps, Sudan Defence Force.
- Sol Tayin (Quartermaster-Sergeant) Ahmed Salama, Camel Corps, Sudan Defence Force.
- Bash Shavish (Company Sergeant-Major) Allagabu Surur, Equatorial Corps, Sudan Defence Force.

Civil Division
For Gallantry

- Yehia el Imam. Police Constable, Khartoum Province Police. For an act of conspicuous courage. Citation: "This Constable, having failed to kill with his baton a rabid dog when it was attacking a man, strangled it with his hands, being severely bitten in the struggle. There is no doubt that by his prompt action and bravery he saved many from infection."
- Baldev Singh. Sub-Inspector of Police, Punjab. "This officer displayed great bravery in organising and leading an attack under fire on a dangerous gang of offenders in the Ferozepore district in June last. In July he narrowly escaped death in a successful raid on a house occupied by persons in unlawful possession of arms."
- Bhim Singh. Sub-Inspector of Police, Punjab. Citation: "For great courage and a total disregard of danger in effecting the capture of a native of the Jullundur district who had shot two persons dead and had attacked another."

For Meritorious Service

- Edward Bellamy. Class I Chief Officer, Wandsworth Prison.
- Sydney William Hulland. Principal Officer in the Prison Service.
- Alfred Leslie Layland. Head Gardener and Caretaker, Imperial War Graves Commission, France.
- Harold Luxton, Head Gardener and Caretaker, Imperial War Graves Commission, France.
- Walter Middleton. Class I Chief Officer, Pentonville Prison.
- Charles Poupart, Chief Inspector, Metropolitan Special Constabulary Reserve.
- James Robinson. For services on the occasion of an accident in a boiler house at Preston.
- George Henry Sharpies. For services on the occasion of an accident in a boiler house at Preston.
- Ali Effendi Hussein. Officer in charge of Police, Port Sudan.
- Fadl el Mula Ahmed. Head lineman, Sudan Posts and Telegraphs Department.
- Ibrahim-el Hajj. Dispensary doctor, Sudan Medical Service.
- Ibrahim Ramadan. Bash Shawish, Bahr el Ghazal Province Police, Sudan.
- Isa Faris. Muawim of Arabs, Kassala Province, Sudan.
- Mursi Gibril. Bash farrash, Government Building, Khartoum.
- Ramadan Effendi Mohammed Omara. Chargeman, Sudan Government Steamers.
- Sayed Atiyeh. Dispensary doctor, Sudan Medical Service.
- Alfred James Bailey, Charge Sergeant, Police, Madras.
- Oswald Joseph Bosen, Charge Sergeant, Police, Madras.
- Thomas Henry Horlock. Reserve Inspector of Police, Raipur, Central Provinces, India.
- Christopher Denny James Winter. Sergeant, Indian Army Service Corps.
- Kuppuswami Nayudu. Havildar Major, Guntur Reserve Police, Madras.
- Raghu Lakshman, Liftman, Civil Secretariat, Bombay.
- Ralph Hubert Eyles, British Honduras. For services rendered after the recent earthquake disaster.
- Richard Brindley Woods. British Honduras. For services rendered after the recent earthquake disaster.
- Hitam bin Mayat, Sub-Inspector (retired), Federated Malay States Police.

=== Air Force Cross ===
- Flight Lieutenant William Evelyn Patrick Johnson.
- Flying Officer Peter Dicken Cracroft.

=== Air Force Medal ===
- Sergeant (Pilot) Thomas Arthur Newton.

=== King's Police Medal (KPM) ===
For Gallantry
England and Wales

- Matthias Farthing, Sergeant, Wiltshire Constabulary.
- Harry Claud Vivian Barwick, Constable, Metropolitan Police Force.
- Arthur James Giles, Constable, City of London Police Force.
- Ernest Edward England, Constable, Wiltshire Constabulary.
- Harry Boasman, Constable, Hull City Police J Force.

Isle of Man

- Philip Henry Watterson, Sergeant, Isle of Man Constabulary.

Australia

- Francis Fahey, Sergeant, Queensland Police Force.

New Zealand

- Frederick Arthur Horace Baker, Constable, New Zealand Police Force.
- Walter Sydney Hammond, Constable, New Zealand Police Force.

Union of South Africa

- Gert Stephanus Burgers, Constable, South African Police Force.

British India

- Desamanikkam Rengaswami Srinivasa Ayyangar, Sub-Inspector, Madras Police.
- Narasimhachari Krishnamachari, Sub-Inspector, Madras Police.
- Quadir Muhiuddin, Head Constable, Madras Police.
- Vijayan Servai, Constable, Madras Police.
- Challa Audayya, Constable, Madras Police.
- Soma Adar, Constable, Bombay Police.
- Bhimaji Ramji Gund, Constable, Bombay Police.
- Alexander William Brotherston, Inspector, Bombay Police.
- Lakman Raoji Kolekar, Sub-Inspector, Bombay Police.
- Jan Gul Khan Gul Head Constable, Bombay Police.
- Dashratha Govinda Gavane, Head Constable, Bombay Police.
- Mahmadkhan Gawas Khan, Sub-Inspector, Bombay Police.
- James Arthur Knappett, Inspector, Bombay Police.
- Abbas Ali Mean, Sub-Inspector, Bengal Police.
- Frederick Brown, Inspector, Bengal Police.
- William Lewis, Sergeant, Bengal Police.
- Siddique Dewan, Sub-Inspector, Bengal Police.
- Rai Sahib Pandit Shambhu Nath, Officiating Inspector, United Provinces Police.
- Bhurey Singh, Constable, United Provinces Police.
- Dalip Singh Foot Constable, Punjab Police.
- Umar Din, Foot Constable, Punjab Police.
- Kabir-ul-Haq, Sub-Inspector, Punjab Police.
- Kharak Singh, Inspector, Punjab Police.
- Narindar Singh, Sub-Inspector, Punjab Police.
- Subedar Dhojbir Sunwar, Burma Military Police.
- Jemadar Thuom Chin, IDSM, Burma Military Police.
- Jemadar Padam Singh Rai, Reserve Battalion, Burma Military Police.
- Anup Narayan Kuar, Inspector, Bihar and Orissa Police.
- Ali Hasain, Sub-Inspector, Bihar and Orissa Police.
- Ranu Misra, Constable, Bihar and Orissa Police.
- Gul Khan, Sub-Inspector, North-West Frontier Province Police.
- Tajuddin, Assistant Sub-Inspector, North-West Frontier Province Police.
- Nur Akbar, Head Constable, North-West Frontier Province Police.
- Issa Nongha, Chief Constable, Western India States Agency Police.
- Chand Ram, Constable, Ajmer-Merwara Police.

Colonies, Protectorates and Mandated Territories

- Duncan William Macintosh, Inspector of Police, Straits Settlements.
- Lydmar William Charles Byrde, Inspector of Police, Straits Settlements.
- Frank Farquharson, Inspector of Police, Straits Settlements.
- Giam Ah Long, Sub-Inspector of Police, Straits Settlements.
- Hashim bin Mat, Detective Police Constable, Straits Settlements.
- Ibrahim bin Abdul Karim, Detective Police Constable, Straits Settlements.
- Ramasamy Suppiah, Detective Police Constable, Straits Settlements.
- Tibo Moshi, Escort Police Sergeant, Gold Coast.

His Majesty has also graciously consented to the King's Police Medal being handed.to the next-of-kin of the deceased officers whose names appear below, and who would have received the decoration had they survived:

- William Edward Harvey Brackstone, Sergeant, Bombay Police.
- Ram Gopal, Naik, United Provinces Police.
- Karam Dad, Foot Constable, Punjab Police.

For Distinguished Service
England and Wales

- George Thomas Knight MBE Chief Constable of Hertfordshire.
- Edward Williams, Chief Constable of Caernarvonshire.
- Richard Ogle, Chief Constable, Gateshead Borough Police Force.
- Edwin Weatherhogg, Chief Constable, Rotherham Borough Police Force.
- Robert Potter, Assistant Chief Constable, Manchester City Police Force.
- Henry John Martin MBE Superintendent, Metropolitan Police Force.
- William Thomas Brooks, Superintendent and Deputy Chief Constable, Wiltshire Constabulary.
- William Drakeley, Superintendent and Deputy Chief Constable, Warwickshire Constabulary.
- Walter Edwin Neate, Superintendent, Nottinghamshire Constabulary.
- John Murray Learmont, Chief Superintendent, Liverpool City Police Force.
- John James Peake, Chief Superintendent, Sheffield City Police Force.
- James Berrett, lately Chief Inspector (Criminal Investigation Department), Metropolitan Police Force.
- Herbert Burrows, Fire Superintendent, Newcastle upon Tyne Fire Brigade.
- William Gooch, Superintendent, Burton-on-Trent Fire Brigade.
- Horace Sampson Lyne MBE Chief of the Newport (Monmouthshire) Fire Brigade.

His Majesty has also graciously consented to the King's Police Medal being handed.to the next-of-kin of the deceased officers whose names appear below, and who would have received the decoration had they survived:

- Jayatilleke Nawaratne Mudiyanselage Mudiyanse, Police Constable, Ceylon.

Scotland

- Ewen MacDonald, Superintendent and Deputy Chief Constable, Inverness-shire Constabulary.
- Alexander Cameron, Superintendent, Glasgow City Police Force.
- John Hunter, Superintendent, Glasgow City Police Force.
- Finlay Low, Superintendent, Edinburgh City Police Force.

Southern Rhodesia

- James Fife Douglas, Regimental Sergeant-Major, British South Africa Police.

British India

- U Maung Gale (1), District Superintendent, Burma Police. (bar to the King's Police Medal)
- Arthur Reginald Jakeman, Assistant Superintendent, Madras Police.
- Ambullur Ezekiel David Frederick, Assistant Superintendent, Madras Police.
- Arunachala Mudaliyar Muttayya Mudaliyar Avargal, Inspector, Madras Police.
- Charles Henry Houghton, Sergeant, Madras Police.
- Gerald George Ray, Superintendent, Bombay Police.
- Charles Edward Stuart Fairweather, Superintendent, Bengal Police.
- Rudra Pada Ray, Assistant Sub-Inspector, Bengal Police.
- Bhrigu Nath Tewari, Constable, Bengal Police.
- Monoranjan Bhattacharji, Inspector, Bengal Police.
- Rai Sahib Saurendra Nath Mitra, Officiating Deputy Superintendent, Bengal Police.
- Geoffrey Glennie Field, Superintendent, United Provinces Police.
- Cyril Kenneth Kemp, Officiating Superintendent, United Provinces Police.
- Eric Maxfield Rogers, Officiating Superintendent United Provinces Police.
- J. D. Warburton, Inspector, Punjab Police.
- Captain Terence Seymour Conner 215th Punjab Regiment.
- Archibald Dunbar, Officiating Deputy Inspector-General, Burma Police.
- Captain Frederic Hugh Rust OBE Commandant, Burma Military Police.
- Arthur George Snadden, Deputy Superintendent, Burma Police.
- Isaac Francis Abreu, Deputy Superintendent, Burma Police.
- Bhola Nath Mallik, Assistant Superintendent, Bihar and Orissa Police.
- Alexander Purvis Jack, District Superintendent, Central Provinces Police.
- Brahma Swarup, Circle Inspector, Central Provinces Police.
- Manohar Lai Puri, Deputy Director-General, His Exalted Highness the Nizam's District Police.

Colonies, Protectorates and Mandated Territories

- Nasrullah Subedar, Federated Malay States Police.
- Harold Fairburn, Inspector-General of Police, Straits Settlements.
- William George Porter, Inspector of Police, Straits Settlements.
- Joseph Edward Axisa, Superintendent of Police, Malta.
- Victor Colin Curnock, Superintendent in charge of Criminal Investigation Department, Nyasaland Police.
- Hassan Faiz Idrissi, Assistant Superintendent of Police, Palestine.
- Colonel William Ernest Horatio Bradburn, Inspector-General of Police, British Guiana.
- Lieutenant-Colonel John Wolseley Wilson MC VD Deputy Inspector-General of Constabulary, Trinidad and Tobago.
- Arthur James Bowry, Sergeant-Major, Leeward Islands Police.

=== Imperial Service Medal (ISM) ===
- Kattampalli Kanaran, Selection Grade Warder (retired), Central Jail, Cannanore, Malabar District, Madras.
- Sahebjan Khan, Head Peon (retired), Commissioner's Office, Orissa Division, Bihar and Orissa.
- Mahomad Lai, Bombay District Police, Unarmed Head Constable, Grade II (retired), Bombay.
- Thathula Venkataswami, Selection Grade Warder (retired), Central Jail, Bellary, Madras.

=== Royal Red Cross (RRC) ===
Second Class

- Superintending Sister Florence Mina d'Exeter Jordan.
