= Great Depression in India =

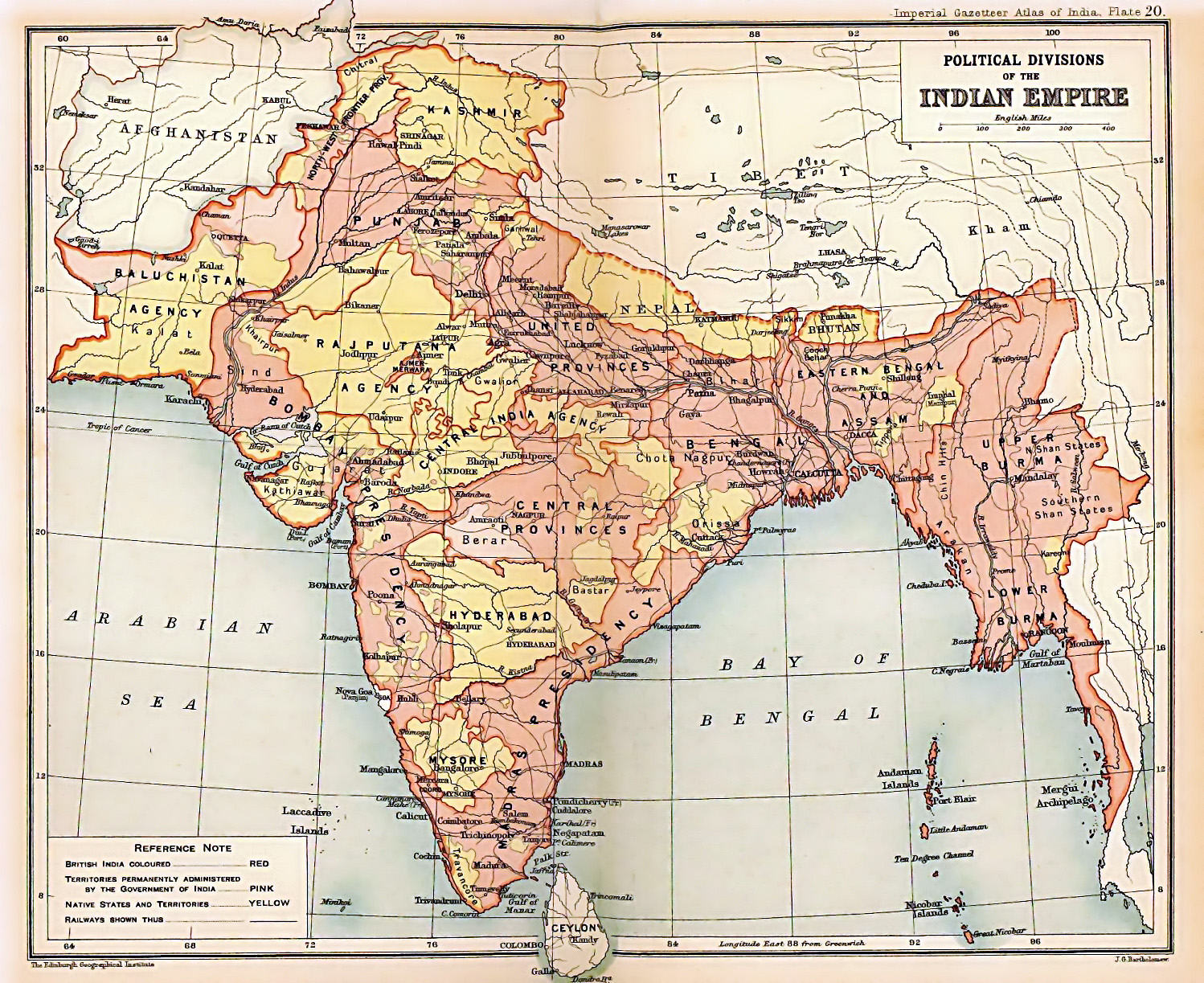
A map of British India in 1909

The Great Depression in India was a period of economic depression in the Indian subcontinent, then under the British Raj. Beginning in 1929 in the United States, the Great Depression soon began to spread to countries around the globe. A financial crisis, combined with protectionist policies adopted by the colonial government resulted in a rapid increase in the price of commodities in British India. During the period 1929–1937, exports and imports in India fell drastically, crippling seaborne international trade in the region; the Indian railway and agricultural sectors were the most affected by the depression. Discontent from farmers resulted in riots and rebellions against colonial rule, while increasing Indian nationalism led to the Salt Satyagraha of 1930, in which Mahatma Gandhi undertook marches to the sea in order to protest against the British salt tax.

The Great Depression, along with the resulting economic policies from the colonial government, worsened already deteriorating Indo-British relations. When the first general elections were held as stipulated in the Government of India Act 1935, anti-British feelings resulted in the pro-independence Indian National Congress winning in most provinces with a very high percentage of the vote share. The extent to which the Great Depression affected the Indian economy has been fiercely contested, with some historians arguing that the economic depression slowed long-term industrial development in India. Revisionist scholars have argued that depression had only a small impact in India's modern secondary sector, as in terms of output, there was no depression in India between 1929 and 1934. However, there were negative impacts on the jute industry, as world demand fell and prices plunged. Local markets in agriculture and small-scale industry showed modest gains.

== Economy of British India ==
Indian economy had been largely agricultural before and during the rule of the British. However, during British rule, there was a major shift from the growth of food grains to the cultivation of cash crops. This change was fostered by the colonial government in order to provide material for the textile mills in England, the most important of them being the cotton mills of Manchester and Lancashire which were supplied with raw cotton produced in India. Since 1858, committees were established to investigate the possibility of cotton cultivation in India to provide raw materials for the mills in Lancashire. New technologies and industries were also introduced in India, albeit on a very small scale compared to developed nations of the world.

The sources of a nation's wealth are agriculture, commerce and manufactures, and sound financial administration. British rule has given India peace; but British administration has not promoted or widened these sources of national wealth in India.

— Romesh Chunder Dutt, India in the Victorian Age: An Economic History of the people, Preface, Pg ix.

Import duties on British goods were reduced following the 1879 famine. In 1882, apart from those on salt and liquor, all other import duties were abolished. Duties on cotton were revived in 1894 only to be removed once again in 1896.

== Problems caused by the gold standard ==
The British government adopted the gold standard in the 1790s. Gold was used to determine the value of the pound sterling throughout the 19th century and the first quarter of the 20th century. The value of the pound sterling depended on the amount of pound sterling needed to purchase a fixed quantity of gold. At the onset of the First World War, the cost of gold was very low and therefore the pound sterling had high value. But during the First World War, the value of the pound fell alarmingly due to rising war expenses (by prompting the government to print more money). At the conclusion of the war, the value of the pound was only a fraction of what it used to be prior to the commencement of the war. It remained low until 1925, when the then Chancellor of the Exchequer of United Kingdom, Winston Churchill, restored it to pre-War levels. As a result, the price of gold fell rapidly. While the rest of Europe purchased large quantities of gold from the United Kingdom, there was little increase in the financial reserves. This dealt a blow to an already deteriorating economy. The British government then began to look to its possessions in India to compensate for the gold that had been sold.

"However, the price of gold in India, on the basis of the exchange rate of the rupee around 1S.6d., was lower than the price prevailing abroad practically throughout; the disparity in prices made the export of the metal profitable, which phenomenon continued for almost a decade. Thus, in 1931-32, there were net exports of 7.7 million ounces, valued at ₹57.98 crores. In the following year, both the quantity and the price rose further, net exports totaling 8.4 million ounces, valued at ₹65.52 crores. In the ten years ended March 1941, total net exports were of the order of 43 million ounces (1337.3 Tons) valued at about ₹375 crores, or an average price of ₹32-12-4 per tola."

== India at the onset of the Depression ==
India was one of the foremost suppliers of raw materials during the First World War. India provided large quantities of iron, steel and other material for the manufacture of arms and armaments. Manufacturing units were gradually established and for the first time, the British Raj adopted a policy of industrialization. India acted both as a supplier as well as a sprawling market for finished British goods in order to sustain Britain's wartime economy.

When the war came to an end, the Montagu-Chelmsford reforms were enacted in order to provide certain concessions to Indians in return for their loyalty to the Empire during the war. In 1923, the British Raj offered government protection to nine industries posing them as a sincere bid to industrialize the economy. However, the measures appeared symbolic and were intended to finance and protect British enterprise as was evident from the fact that all the benefactors were British-run industries. At the onset of the Great Depression, as it had been always, much of India's imports were from the United Kingdom. On the eve of the First World War, India was the British Empire's single largest market with its exports to India at ₹730 million making up over one-sixth of the country's total exports.

During the annual fiscal year 1928–29, the total revenue for the Government of India was ₹1,548 million. The total exports were valued at ₹3,390 million while imports were valued at ₹2,630 million.

== Impact of the Great Depression ==
India suffered badly due to the Great Depression. The price decline from late 1929 to October 1931 was 36 percent compared to 27 percent in the United Kingdom and 26 percent in the United States.

=== Economic policy of the Raj during the Depression ===
During the Depression, the British Raj intensified the existing protectionist economic policies. Because the fall in prices had been higher in India compared to the rest of the world, the price of commodities manufactured in India rose dramatically compared to imports from the United Kingdom and other countries around the globe. Farmers who were cultivating food crops had earlier moved over to cash crop cultivation in large numbers to meet the demands of the mills in the United Kingdom. Now, they were crippled economically as they were unable to sell their products in India due to the high prices; nor could they export the commodities to the United Kingdom which had recently adopted a protective policy prohibiting imports from India. Angus Maddison's historical dataset shows Indian GDP actually rose around 1% from 1929 to 1932, a much better outcome than for most other economies.

Rice, wheat, etc., could be used for private consumption but the cash crops which they now cultivated could not be used for private consumption. As there was little sale of indigenous manufactures and limited exports, commodities accumulated and the flow of cash was restricted. Moreover, imports were severely affected by the Swadeshi movement and the boycott of foreign goods imposed by Indian Freedom Fighters. There was a deficiency of money in many places causing widespread poverty.

In such a condition, the most recommended course of action is the devaluation of currency. Most countries afflicted by the Great Depression such as Australia, New Zealand, Brazil and Denmark reduced the exchange value of their currencies. However, the British Raj rejected the idea. A recommended course of action to increase mobility of cash is rise of government expenditure. However, the Government was less interested in spending than accumulation.

=== International trade ===
International trade decreased a great deal. The imports fell by over 47% while the exports fell by over 49% between 1929 and 1932. Between 1928–29 and 1933–34, exports due to seaborne trade decreased by 55.75% to ₹1.25 billion while imports decreased by 55.51% to ₹2.02 billion.

=== Impact on the Railways ===
Due to a decline in exports and imports, and thereby, in the transportation of goods, the railway revenues decreased exponentially. All the expenses for the years 1930–31 and 1931–32 were paid from the Railway Reserve Fund. There was a decrease of ₹151 million in the railway revenues between 1930 and 1932.

=== Dealing with home charges ===
In British India, apart from existing imports and exports, there was also a particular amount of money which colonial India contributed towards administration, maintenance of the army, war expenses, pensions to retired officers and other expenses accrued by Britain towards maintenance of her colony. These were known as "Home charges" and were paid for almost entirely by India.

The Home charges was made of five components

- Interest payable on Indian debt.
- Divident to shareholders of East India Company
- Interest on the railways
- Civil and military charges.
- Store purchases in England

Due to the drastic collapse of international trade and the very little revenue obtained for it, India could only pay off her home charges by selling off her gold reserves. From 1931–32 to 1934–35, India exported ₹ 2,330 million worth of gold.

== Consequences ==
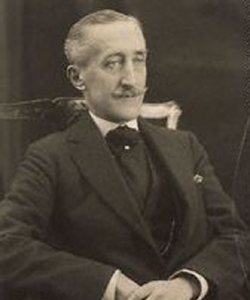
Lord Willingdon, the Viceroy of India, during the Depression

The Great Depression had a devastating impact on Indian farmers. While there was a steady, uninhibited increase in land rent, the value of the agricultural produce had come down to alarming levels. Therefore, having incurred heavy losses, farmers were compelled to sell off gold and silver ornaments in their possession in order to pay the land rent and other taxes.

By 1931, around 1600 ounces of gold were arriving every day at the port of Bombay. This gold intake was transported to the United Kingdom to compensate for the low bullion prices in the country and thereby revitalize the British economy, which was also experiencing a downturn due to the Great Depression|

The Viceroy of India, Lord Willingdon remarked that:

For the first time in history, owing to the economic situation, Indians are disgorging gold. We have sent to London in the past two or three months, 25,000,000 sterling and I hope that the process will continue.

=== Founding of the Reserve Bank of India ===
The policies of the Government of India during the Great Depression resulted in widespread protests all over the country. As the national struggle intensified, the Government of India conceded some of the economic demands of the nationalists, including the establishment of a central bank. Accordingly, the Reserve Bank of India Act was passed in 1934 and a central bank came into being on April 1, 1935, with Sir Osborne Smith as its first Governor. However, when Osborne Smith tried to function independently and indulged in open confrontation with P. J. Grigg, the finance member of the Viceroy's Council, he was removed from office.

== Related events ==
=== Declaration of independence ===
On December 31, 1929, at a session of the Indian National Congress held on the banks of the river Ravi in Lahore, Jawaharlal Nehru unfurled the tricolor and declared that complete independence from British rule would, henceforth, be the goal of the Congress. This was a remarkable shift of policy for the Indian National Congress as it had, till now, been a staunch advocate of dominion status. This declaration also triggered the Civil Disobedience Movement, which commenced with the Salt Satyagraha.

=== Salt Satyagraha ===
The Salt Satyagraha formed the highpoint of the Civil Disobedience Movement. While the heavy salt tax was always a burden to the poor peasant, the widespread poverty during the Great Depression made it even more difficult for the commoner to procure salt. In response to this tax, between March 12, 1930, and April 5, 1930, Mahatma Gandhi marched with over 30,000 followers to the coastal town of Dandi in Gujarat, where they illegally manufactured salt and defied the Government monopoly on salt. Subsequently, similar satyagrahas were organized at Dharasana and Vedaranyam. The Government responded with a massive roundup, but by then, the march and the media coverage had radically moulded international opinion.
