= David Devadoss =

Indian judge (1868–1955)

David Muthaiah Devadoss
- Born: 18 December 1868; Palayamkottai, Tamil Nadu, India
- Died: 11 July 1955 (aged 86); Madras, Tamil Nadu, India
- Occupation: Judge
- Spouse: Masilamani Chellammal

Sir David Muthiah Devadoss (18 December 1868 – 11 July 1955) was an Indian judge of the Madras High Court who served as a member of the Council of State.

== Early life ==
Devadoss was born in Palayamcottah on 18 December 1868 to E. Muthiah Pillai. He studied at the C. M. S. High School, Palayamcottah and the Madras Law College and qualified for the bar from the Inner Temple.

== Career ==
Devadoss enrolled as a vakil of the Madras High Court in 1892 and became a judge in 1921. Upon retirement in 1928, Devadoss was nominated to the Council of State in New Delhi. Devadoss was knighted in the 1932 New Year Honours.

== Personal life ==
Devadoss married Masilamoney Chellammal, the daughter of J.T. Srinivasagen Pillai. She died in 1948. David Devadoss died in Madras on 11 July 1955, at the age of 86. Their children were Seetha, Muthamma, Vedha, and Muthukrishnan. Only Vedha married Raja Rhenius. They had one son, Jayanth Rhenius.
