= William Goudge =

English cricketer and Royal Navy Chaplain

Personal information
- Full name: William Henry Goudge
- Born: 29 October 1877; Highworth, Wiltshire, England
- Died: 31 May 1967 (aged 89); Cheltenham, Gloucestershire, England
- Batting: Right-handed
- Role: Wicket-keeper

Domestic team information
- Years: Team
- 1896–1899: Wiltshire

Career statistics
Competition	First-class
Matches	5
Runs scored	191
Batting average	19.10
100s/50s	–/2
Top score	58
Catches/stumpings	3/–
- Source: Cricinfo, 27 June 2019

William Henry Goudge OBE (29 October 1877 – 31 May 1967) was an English first-class cricketer and Royal Navy chaplain, serving between 1902 and 1931. He also played first-class cricket for the Royal Navy Cricket Club.

== Life and naval career ==
Goudge was born in September 1877 at Highworth, Wiltshire. He was educated at Bath College before accepting a mathematics scholarship to Pembroke College, Oxford. Although awarded his scholarship on the back of his academic achievements in mathematics, he instead studied theology at Pembroke, graduating with a B.A.

He made his debut in minor counties cricket for Wiltshire in the 1896 Minor Counties Championship, and would make 22 appearances for Wiltshire between 1896 and 1899. After graduating from Pembroke, he was appointed as a chaplain in the Royal Navy in September 1902, while in February the following year he was appointed as an instructor.

Following the First World War he played first-class cricket as an opening batsman for the Royal Navy, making his debut against Cambridge University at Fenner's in 1919. He made four further first-class appearances between 1919 and 1923, all against the British Army cricket team at Lord's. He scored 191 runs in his five first-class matches at an average of 19.10, with a high score of 58. He stood as an umpire in the first-class fixture between the Royal Navy and the touring New Zealanders in 1927.

He retired from active service at his own request in December 1931, and the following month he was made an OBE in the 1932 New Year Honours. He died at Cheltenham in May 1967.
