= Grattan Bushe =

British lawyer and colonial governor (1886–1961)

Bushe in 1941

Sir Henry Grattan Bushe, KCMG, CB (1 January 1886 – 23 August 1961) was a British colonial governor and lawyer.

Bushe was born in Trinidad, the son of John Scott Bushe, the Colonial Secretary of Trinidad. An ancestor was the Irish judge Sir Charles Kendal Bushe. Bushe was educated at Aysgarth School and Denstone College. He was called to the bar in 1909, and joined the chambers of Sir Edward Marshall Hall. In 1917, he joined the Colonial Office, becoming Legal Adviser to the Colonial Office and the Dominions Office in 1931.

In 1941, Bushe was appointed Governor of Barbados. The promotion was said to be without precedent, as Bushe was the first colonial governor to be appointed from the Colonial Office legal staff. He retired in 1946.

Bushe was appointed a Companion of the Order of St Michael and St George (CMG) in the 1927 Birthday Honours, a Companion of the Order of the Bath (CB) in the 1932 New Year Honours, and promoted to Knight Commander of the Order of St Michael and St George (KCMG) in the 1936 New Year Honours.
