= 1932 New Year Honours (New Zealand) =

Annual awards for New Zealanders

The 1932 New Year Honours in New Zealand were awards by King George V, announced on 1 January 1932, of the King's Police Medal to two police officers in recognition of their gallantry during the rescue of crew from the steamer Progress, which was wrecked in Ōwhiro Bay, Wellington, on 1 May 1931. The New Zealand government declined to make recommendations for the appointment of New Zealanders to other orders and honours, with prime minister George Forbes saying that the country was preoccupied with the 1931 general election campaign at the time when recommendations were due to be made.

The recipients of honours are displayed here as they were styled before their new honour.

== King's Police Medal ==
For gallantry

- Frederick Arthur Horace Baker – constable, New Zealand Police Force.
- Walter Sydney Hammond – constable, New Zealand Police Force.
