= Edward Baily (cricketer) =

English cricketer

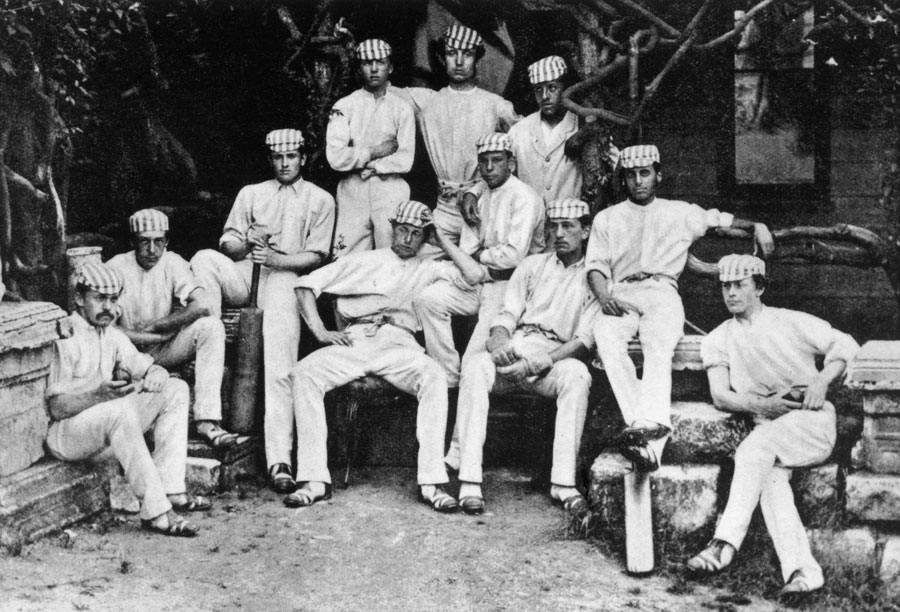
Harrow cricket team of 1869 for the match against Eton. Bailey is in the front row, third from the right.

Edward Peter Baily (St John's Wood, London 18 January 1852 – Tupsley, Herefordshire 21 January 1941) was an English first-class cricketer.

Edward Baily was educated at Harrow and Caius College, Cambridge. He represented Cambridge University (being awarded two blues) in nine matches (1872–1874) and Middlesex in first-class cricket as a right-handed batsman and wicketkeeper.

He became a preparatory school headmaster at Limpsfield in Surrey before retiring in 1906 to Herefordshire.

His son Robert Baily represented Cambridge University and Surrey.
