= Governor Taylor =

Governor Taylor may refer to:

- Alfred A. Taylor (1848–1931), 34th Governor of Tennessee
- David G. P. Taylor (1933–2007), Governor of Montserrat from 1990 to 1993
- Duncan Taylor (diplomat) (born 1958), Governor of the Cayman Islands from 2010 to 2013
- James Braid Taylor (1891–1943), 2nd Governor of the Reserve Bank of India
- John Taylor (South Carolina governor) (1770–1832), 51st Governor of South Carolina
- Leon Rutherford Taylor (1883–1924), Acting Governor of New Jersey from 1913 to 1914
- Robert Love Taylor (1850–1912), 24th Governor of Tennessee, brother of Alfred A. Taylor
- William Robert Taylor (1820–1909), 12th Governor of Wisconsin
- William S. Taylor (Kentucky politician) (1853–1928), 33rd Governor of Kentucky

== See also ==
- William Tailer (1676–1732), Acting Governor of the Province of Massachusetts Bay from 1715 to 1716
- John Tayler (1742–1829), Acting 5th Governor of New York in 1817
