= Newspaper Proprietors Association =

British trade association

The Newspaper Proprietors Association was a London-based trade association.

It opposed proposed legislation in 1908 to restrict the publication of unauthorised military information. In 1912 it was a member of the Admiralty, War Office and Press Committee, the fore-runner of the D-Notice system. Letters, or telegrams, sent to editors asking them not to carry certain stories in the interest of national security were known as "Parkers" after Ernest Parke who was then the representative of the Association on the Committee.

It opposed proposals by the BBC to produce a magazine in 1928.

Some of its records are held in the British National Archives.
