= Robert Baily =

English cricketer

Robert Edward Hartwell Baily
- Born: 6 June 1885
- Died: 19 September 1973
- Occupation: Cricketer

Robert Edward Hartwell Baily CBE (6 June 1885 – 19 September 1973) was an English cricketer of Surrey and Cambridge University. A gentlemen cricketer, Baily played for Surrey and Cambridge between 1904 and 1908. He was also captain of Harrow School's First XI during his time there, as well as his own representative team: REH Baily's XI; he played for Gentlemen of England in 1905 and the Marylebone Cricket Club in 1909. Born in Limpsfield, Surrey, where his father ran a preparatory school, he died in Hereford.

His father, Edward Baily, played first-class cricket for Cambridge University and Middlesex.

On leaving Cambridge, Baily joined the Sudan Political Service and served there 1909–32, including as governor of Kassala Province 1926–32.
