= Osborne Smith =

Indian banker and first governor of the Reserve Bank of India

Sir Osborne Smith KCSI, KCIE
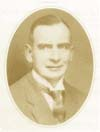

1st Governor of the Reserve Bank of India
- In office 1 April 1935 – 30 June 1937
- Preceded by: Position established
- Succeeded by: James Braid Taylor

Personal details
- Born: 26 December 1876 Campbelltown, Colony of New South Wales
- Died: 30 August 1952 (aged 75) Melbourne, Victoria, Australia
- Profession: Banker

Sir Osborne Arkell Smith, KCSI, KCIE (26 December 1876 – 30 August 1952) was an Australian banker and the first Governor of the Reserve Bank of India, a post he held from 1 April 1935 to 30 June 1937.

== Biography ==
Smith was a professional banker who served for 20 years with the Bank of New South Wales and 10 years with the Commonwealth Bank of Australia. He then came to India in 1926 as Managing Governor of the Imperial Bank of India. He was knighted in March 1929, and was invested with his knighthood by the Governor-General of India, Lord Irwin, at the new Viceroy's House in New Delhi on 27 February 1930. Smith was further appointed a KCIE in the 1932 New Year Honours list and appointed a KCSI in February 1937.

His stewardship of the Imperial Bank won him recognition in banking circles in India. Since his outlook on policy issues like the exchange rates and interest rates differed with that of the Government, he resigned before the completion of his term of office.

Sir Osborne did not sign any Indian rupee notes during his tenure.
