= Frederick John Alban =

Sir Frederick John Alban (11 January 1882 – 2 May 1965) was a chartered accountant, administrator, and writer.

== Biography ==
He was born and grew up in Abergavenny, attending the National School until the age of 12. His parents both died when he was still a child, and he was brought up by a relative whilst his older brothers went out to work.

Soon after a move to Pontypridd at the age of seventeen, he began training in accountancy. He placed first in final examinations of the Institute of Municipal Treasurers and Accountants in 1914, the Institute of Chartered Accountants, and the Society of Incorporated Accountants and Auditors. After working for the United Water Board of Pontypridd and Rhondda for a short time, he was employed by the Welsh National Insurance Commission and the Ministry of Food in Wales. He established the firm Alban & Lamb, chartered accountants, with Norman Ernest Lamb in Newport and Cardiff.

He was President of the Society of Incorporated Accountants in 1947. A critic of nationalisation, he gave a speech to the American Institute of Accountants in Chicago and another to the Charter Institute of Secretaries in Montreal, Quebec, Canada, saying that the process had been "bungled" in the UK and had not done the coal industry any good. He also stated that the creation of the National Health Service meant that "incentive is gone".

== Published works ==
- Rating Accounts and Finance under the Rating and Valuation Act (F. J. Alban, Norman E. Lamb, and F. E. Price, 1925)
- Socialisation in Great Britain and its Effects on the Accountancy Profession (F. J. Alban, 1954).
