= James Kingston Fowler =

British physician

Sir James Kingston Fowler, KCMG, KCVO, FRCP (11 March 1852 – 3 July 1934) was a British physician, noted for his work at Middlesex Hospital and as an expert in diseases of the lungs.

== Early life and education ==
James Kingston Fowler was born at Woburn, Bedfordshire, on 11 March 1852; he was the fifth son of James Fowler and his wife, Frances, daughter of Henry Sargeant of Bedford. He was admitted at King's College, London, in 1870, initially to prepare him for ordination into the priesthood, but he decided to pursue a medical career instead.

At King's, Fowler completed his initial medical training and in 1871 won a Warneford scholarship. He qualified in 1874 as a Member of the Royal College of Surgeons (MRCS), and then spent two years as House Surgeon and Physician at King's College Hospital. In 1876, he gained the diploma of Licentiate of the Royal College of Physicians (LRCP) and then, between 1877 and 1879 was House Physician at Addenbrooke's Hospital in Cambridge. While in Cambridge, he entered Caius College and graduated with his Bachelor of Medicine (MB) degree in 1879 and a Bachelor of Arts (BA) degree in 1880.

== Career ==
After leaving Cambridge, Fowler briefly took up a post as Westminster Hospital, but in 1880 he was elected an assistant physician at the Middlesex Hospital. He was promoted to full physician in 1891, and in 1899 was appointed joint lecturer on the practice of medicine. In 1913, he was promoted to Consulting Physician and Emeritus Lecturer. From 1880, he was also associated with Brompton Hospital and later held posts at the Sanatorium in Midhurst. Fowler was also a member of the Senate of London University, playing a part in its reorganisation in 1900, and was dean of the faculty of medicine there. He was also an examiner for the University of Cambridge and a Censor for the Royal College of Physicians. He was also one of the first members of the colonial advisory medical and sanitary committee formed in 1909, and was chairman of the medical appointments board.

Fowler was principally concerned with diseases of the chest. He edited the Dictionary of Practical Medicine in 1890 and then, with Rickman Godlee, published Diseases of the Lungs in 1898. He also completed a monograph, Pulmonary Tuberculosis, in 1921. He also wrote on emphysema and syphilis of the lungs for Allbutt's System of Medicine in 1898 and 1909.

During World War I, Fowler served with the 3rd London Territorial General Hospital as a consulting physician and the rank of colonel; he was stationed at Rouen and Queen Alexandra Military Hospital in Millbank. His wartime service saw him mentioned in dispatches; he was also appointed a Commander of the Order of St Michael and St George (CMG) in 1919; promotion in that order to Knight Commander (KCMG) followed in 1932, when he retired from his positions in the Colonial Office. He also received the Doctor of Science degree from Sheffield University in 1908, and was appointed a Knight Commander of the Royal Victorian Order for attending on Prince Francis of Teck in 1910.

== Personal life ==
According to G. H. Brown's entry in Munk's Roll, Fowler was "an able, well-equipped teacher. Elegant and distinguished in appearance, he had a wide circle of friends in all walks of life." He never married but was a good friend of John Douglas-Scott-Montagu, 2nd Baron Montagu of Beaulieu; Fowler wrote a history of Beaulieu Abbey in 1911 and lived in retirement at the warden's lodge there. He died on 3 July 1934.
