= Wally Hammond (police officer) =

Wally Hammond KPM
- Born: Walter Sydney Hammond; 2 July 1906; Gravesend, Kent, England
- Died: 13 December 1982 (aged 76); Lower Hutt, New Zealand
- Occupation: Police officer

Walter Sydney Hammond KPM (2 July 1906 – 13 December 1982) was a New Zealand policeman, private detective and bailiff. He was born in Gravesend, Kent, England, on 2 July 1906.

In the 1932 New Year Honours, Hammond was awarded the King's Police Medal, in recognition of his gallantry during the rescue of crew from the steamer Progress, which was wrecked in Ōwhiro Bay, Wellington, on 1 May 1931.
