= Public sector banks in India =

List of all government-owned banks in India

Public Sector Undertakings (Banks) are a major type of government-owned banks in India, where a majority stake (i.e., more than 50%) is held by the Ministry of Finance (India) of the Government of India or State Ministry of Finance of various State Governments of India. The shares of these government-owned-banks are listed on stock exchanges. Their main objective is social welfare.

== History ==
=== Emergence of public sector banks ===
The Central Government entered the banking business with the nationalization of the Imperial Bank of India in 1955. A 60% stake was taken by the Reserve Bank of India and the new bank was named State Bank of India. The seven other state banks became subsidiaries of the new bank in 1959 when the State Bank of India (Subsidiary Banks) Act, 1959 was passed by the Union government.

The next major government intervention in banking took place on 19 July 1969 when the Indira government nationalised an additional 14 major banks. The total deposits in the banks nationalised in 1969 amounted to 50 crores. This move increased the presence of nationalised banks in India, with 84% of the total branches coming under government control.

=== Before the economic liberalisation ===
The share of the bank sector held by the public banks continued to grow through the 1980s, and by 1991 public sector banks accounted for 90% of the banking sector. A year later, in March, 1992, the combined total of branches held by public sector banks was 60,646 across India, and deposits accounted for ₹1,10,000 crore. The majority of these banks was profitable, with only one out of the 21 public sector banks reporting a loss.

=== Liberalisation in the 2000s ===
The nationalised banks reported a combined loss of ₹1160 crores. However, the early 2000s saw a reversal of this trend, such that in 2002-03 a profit of ₹7780 crores by the public sector banks: a trend that continued throughout the decade, with a ₹16856 crore profit in 2008–2009.

=== Mergers ===
The consolidation of SBI-associated banks started first by State Bank of India merging its subsidiary between 2008 and 2017.

- State Bank of Saurashtra was merged into SBI on 13 August 2008.
- State Bank of Indore was merged into SBI on August 27, 2010.
- State Bank of Bikaner & Jaipur, State Bank of Hyderabad, State Bank of Mysore, State Bank of Patiala and State Bank of Travancore, and Bharatiya Mahila Bank were merged with SBI with effect from 1 April 2017.
- Vijaya Bank and Dena Bank were merged into Bank of Baroda in 2018.
- IDBI Bank was categorised as a private bank with effect from January 2019 on account of LIC acquiring the shares from GoI.

On 30 August 2019, Minister of Finance Nirmala Sitharaman announced the government's plan for further consolidation of public sector banks. The mergers took effect from 1 April 2020.

- Allahabad Bank was merged into Indian Bank.
- Oriental Bank of Commerce and United Bank of India were merged into Punjab National Bank.
- Andhra Bank and Corporation Bank were merged into Union Bank of India.
- Syndicate Bank was merged into Canara Bank.

== Public Sector Undertakings (Banks) ==
=== Nationalised Banks ===
Currently there are 12 Nationalised Banks in India (Government Shareholding power is denoted in %, as of 27 May 2026):

- State Bank of India (55.5%)
- Canara Bank (62.93%)
- Bank of Baroda (63.97%)
- Punjab National Bank (70.08%)
- Bank of India (73.38%)
- Indian Bank (73.84%)
- Union Bank of India (74.76%)
- Bank of Maharashtra (73.6%)
- UCO Bank (90.95%)
- Central Bank of India (81.19%)
- Indian Overseas Bank (92.44%)
- Punjab & Sind Bank (93.85%)

=== Regional Rural Banks ===
Regional Rural Banks (RRBs) are government owned scheduled commercial banks of India that operate at the regional level in different states of India. These banks are under the ownership of the Ministry of Finance, Government of India, Sponsored Bank and concerned State Government in the ratio of 50:35:15 respectively. They were created to serve rural areas with basic banking and financial services. However, RRBs also have urban branches.

Andhra Pradesh

- Andhra Pradesh Grameena Bank

Arunachal Pradesh

- Arunachal Pradesh Rural Bank

Assam

- Assam Gramin Bank

Bihar

- Bihar Gramin Bank

Chhattisgarh

- Chhattisgarh Gramin Bank

Gujarat

- Gujarat Gramin Bank

Haryana

- Haryana Gramin Bank

Himachal Pradesh

- Himachal Pradesh Gramin Bank

Jammu and Kashmir

- Jammu and Kashmir Grameen Bank

Jharkhand

- Jharkhand Gramin Bank

Karnataka

- Karnataka Grameena Bank

Kerala

- Kerala Grameena Bank

Madhya Pradesh

- Madhya Pradesh Gramin Bank

Maharashtra

- Maharashtra Gramin Bank

Manipur

- Manipur Rural Bank

Meghalaya

- Meghalaya Rural Bank

Mizoram

- Mizoram Rural Bank

Nagaland

- Nagaland Rural Bank

Odisha

- Odisha Grameen Bank

Puducherry

- Puducherry Grama Bank

Punjab

- Punjab Gramin Bank

Rajasthan

- Rajasthan Gramin Bank

Tamil Nadu

- Tamil Nadu Grama Bank

Telangana

- Telangana Grameena Bank

Tripura

- Tripura Gramin Bank

Uttar Pradesh

- Uttar Pradesh Gramin Bank

Uttarakhand

- Uttarakhand Gramin Bank

West Bengal

- West Bengal Gramin Bank

=== Payments Bank ===
Currently there are 1 Nationalised Payment Banks in India (Government Shareholding power is denoted in %, as of 27 May 2026):

- India Post Payment Bank (100%)

== See also ==
- List of banks in India
