= Utkal Grameen Bank =

Indian regional rural bank

- Type: Regional Rural Bank
- Industry: Banking, Financial services
- Founded: 2012
- Headquarters: Bolangir, India
- Area served: Odisha State
- Key people: Alekha Chandra Beura (Chairman)
- Products: Credit cards, consumer banking, corporate banking, finance and insurance, investment banking, mortgage loans, private banking, wealth management
- Net income: INR 90.15 Million
- Owner: Government of India (50%); Government of Odisha (15%); State Bank of India (35%)
- Number of employees: 1340
- Parent: Ministry of Finance, Government of India.
- Website: www.utkalgrameenbank.co.in

Utkal Grameen Bank (UGB; Odia: ଉତ୍କଳ ଗ୍ରାମୀଣ ବ୍ୟାଙ୍କ) is a Regional Rural Bank established on 1 November 2012 with the merger of Rushikulya Gramya Bank and Utkal Gramya Bank in terms of provisions of Regional Rural Banks Act 1976. The bank is sponsored by State Bank of India & is jointly Owned by the Government of India, Government of Odisha and SBI.It is under the ownership of Ministry of Finance, Government of India.

The shareholders of the Bank are Govt. of India (50%), State Bank of India (35%) and Govt. of Odisha (15%). The Bank is operating in 17 districts of Odisha State with its Head Office at Bolangir. Besides, the bank has seven Regional Offices in western and southern Odisha.

== History ==
The bank was established on 1 November 2012 as an amalgamation of the Rushikulya and Utkal RRBs. At the time of amalgamation, Rushikulya bank had only 87 branches. It subsequently grew to a network of 442 branches, of which 360 are in remote rural areas. Apart from the head office at Bolangir, the bank has opened regional offices at Sambalpur, Bolangir, Bargarh, Bhabanipatana, Rayagada, Phulbani, Jeypore and Berhampur.

Presently, the Bank operates in 17 districts of Western and Southern Odisha, covering 63% of the geographical area and 48% of the total population of Odisha State.

== Performance ==
The bank made a profit of Rs 9.01 Crore in the year 2011–12. The bank had a credit-deposit ratio of 59.5% at the time of amalgamation.

In 2015, Utkal Grameen Bank came First in the ranking of all banks in Odisha on Financial Inclusion parameters, with a score of 75 out of 100, becoming the best bank to handle Government business in the State.

== Board of directors ==
The bank's affairs are conducted by a Board of Directors consisting of the following persons :-

- Sri Suryakanta Dash, Chairman
- Sri Tarakanta Bhakta, Deputy Secretary, Finance Department, Govt of Odisha
- Sri Nirmal Chandra Pattnaik, DGM, RBI
- Sri V Balasubramaniam, DGM, NABARD
- Sri Dhruba Charan Bal, DGM, SBI
- Sri Sanjay Tiwary, DGM, SBI

== See also ==
- Banking in India
- List of banks in India
- Reserve Bank of India
- Regional Rural Bank
- Indian Financial System Code
- List of largest banks
- List of companies of India
- Make in India
- Odisha Gramya Bank
