= Rajasthan Gramin Bank =

Regional Rural Bank in Rajasthan, India

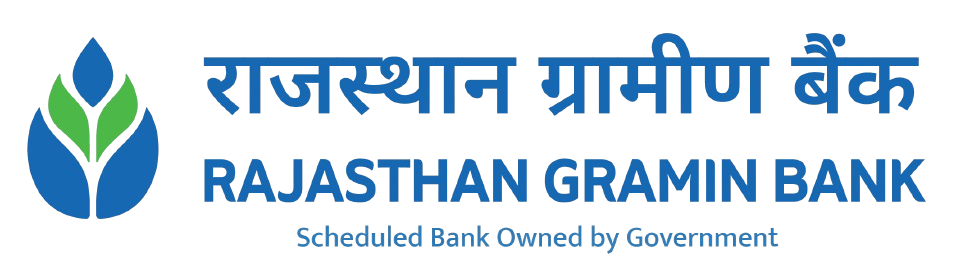
- Native name: राजस्थान ग्रामीण बैंक
- Type: Regional Rural Bank
- Industry: Financial; Regional Rural Banks
- Predecessor: Baroda Rajasthan Kshetriya Gramin Bank Rajasthan Marudhara Gramin Bank
- Founded: May 1, 2025; 16 months ago
- Headquarters: Jaipur Rajasthan, India
- Number of locations: 1596 Branches
- Area served: Rajasthan
- Key people: Shri Mukesh Bhartia (Chairman)
- Products: Retail banking; Corporate banking; Mortgage loans; Private banking; Insurance
- Services: Financial services; Banking
- Owner: Government of India (50%) Government of Rajasthan (15%) State Bank of India (35%)
- Parent: Ministry of Finance, Government of India
- Website: rgb.bank.in; inb.rgb.bank.in

The Rajasthan Gramin Bank (RGB) is an Indian Regional Rural Bank (RRB) in Rajasthan established on 1 May 2025. The bank was formed by the amalgamation of Baroda Rajasthan Kshetriya Gramin Bank and Rajasthan Marudhara Gramin Bank under The "One State, One RRB" policy of government. It currently has 1596 branches in Rajasthan.

It functions under Regional Rural Banks' Act 1976 and is sponsored by State Bank of India.

== History ==
=== Baroda Rajasthan Kshetriya Gramin Bank ===
Baroda Rajasthan Kshetriya Gramin Bank (BRKGB), sponsored by Bank of Baroda, was established by Government of India In exercise of the powers conferred by sub section (1) of section 23A of the Regional Rural Bank Act 1976 (21 of 1976) by issuing Gazette Notification No. F No. 719/2011-RRB dated 01-01-2013, by amalgamating 3 Regional Rural Banks viz. Baroda Rajasthan Gramin Bank Sponsored by Bank of Baroda, Hadoti Gramin Bank Sponsored by Central Bank of India and Rajasthan Gramin Bank, Sponsored by Punjab National Bank. The Head Office of the Bank is at Ajmer and it had 12 Regional Offices.

=== Rajasthan Marudhara Gramin Bank ===
Rajasthan Marudhara Gramin bank (RMGB) was established on April 1, 2014 and headquartered at Jodhpur. The bank was formed by the amalgamation of Marudhara Gramin Bank and Mewar Aanchalik Gramin Bank on 1st April 2014 and a new banking establishment was created known as the Rajasthan Marudhara Gramin Bank under sponsorship of State Bank of Bikaner and Jaipur (now State Bank of India)

== Logo ==
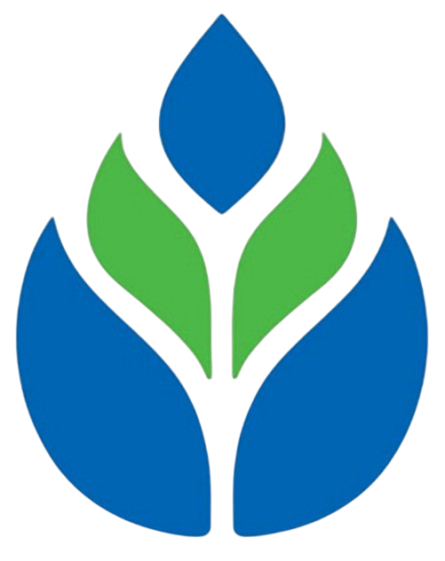
RRB logo used since August 1, 2025

The identity boasts symmetry, stability and craftsmanship.

Key elements include

- Upward Arrow, symbolizing Progress and Growth
- Hands, embodying Nurturing and Care
- Flame, symbolizing enlightentment and warmth

The Regional Rural Bank logo selection process involved a public poll conducted by NABARD in June 2025 to choose a new, common logo for the amalgamated Regional Rural Banks in India, the initiative aimed at creating a unified brand identity for rural banking after the amalgamation of several RRBs. the poll allowed participants to vote on six logo concepts and nine design variations. The initiative was called OneRRBOneLogo reflecting the vision of having a single identity for the RRBs.

== See also ==
- List of banks in India
- Regional rural bank
- Public sector banks in India
- Banking in India
- Reserve Bank of India
- Indian Financial System Code
- Make in India
