= Haryana Gramin Bank =

Regional Rural Bank in Haryana, India

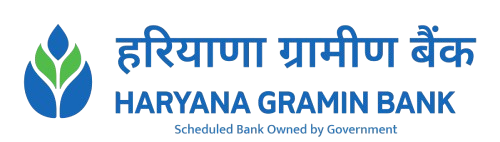
- Native name: हरियाणा ग्रामीण बैंक
- Formerly: Sarva Haryana Gramin Bank (2013–2025)
- Type: Regional Rural Bank
- Industry: Financial; Regional Rural Banks
- Predecessor: Haryana Gramin Bank; Gurgaon Gramin Bank
- Founded: November 29, 2013; 12 years ago
- Headquarters: Rohtak, Haryana, India
- Number of locations: 698 Branches
- Area served: Haryana
- Key people: Sh. Sumant Kumar (Chairman)
- Products: Credit cards, consumer banking, corporate banking, finance and insurance, investment banking, mortgage loans, private banking, private equity, wealth management
- Services: Financial services; Banking
- Owner: Government of India (50%) Government of Haryana (15%) Punjab National Bank (35%)
- Parent: Ministry of Finance, Government of India
- Website: hgb.bank.in

The Haryana Gramin Bank (HGB) is an Indian Regional Rural Bank (RRB) in Haryana established on 2 September 2013. The bank was formed by the amalgamation of Haryana Gramin Bank and Gurgaon Gramin Bank. The amalgamation was formalized via Gazette Notification No. S.O. 3536(E), dated 29.11.2013, issued by the Ministry of Finance, Government of India. With its headquarters in Rohtak, it became the sole Regional Rural Bank (RRB) operating across the state of Haryana. It currently has 698 branches in rural areas of Haryana.

It functions under the Regional Rural Banks' Act of 1976 and is sponsored by Punjab National Bank. According to Notification No. S.O. 4833(E), the Sarva Haryana Gramin Bank has been renamed as Haryana Gramin Bank. On the request of its sponsor, Punjab National Bank (PNB).

== History ==
=== Sarva Haryana Gramin Bank (2013 - 2025) ===
Sarva Haryana Gramin Bank (SHGB) was one of the prominent Regional rural banks in India. According to Notification No. S.O. 3536(E), dated 29.11.2013, issued by the Ministry of Finance, Government of India, the erstwhile Haryana Gramin Bank and Gurgaon Gramin Bank were amalgamated into one entity called Sarva Haryana Gramin Bank (SHGB) , sponsored by Punjab National Bank, having its Head Office at Rohtak, Haryana. SHGB operates in the entire state of Haryana.

On October 23, 2025, Ministry of Finance, Government of India announce the renaming of several Regional Rural Banks (RRBs) to simplify their names and align them with their states. Changes include Sarva Haryana Gramin Bank becoming Haryana Gramin Bank and several others being renamed after requests from their sponsor banks. The functional jurisdiction and operations of these banks remain unchanged.

=== Haryana Gramin Bank (2005-2013) ===
The Haryana Gramin Bank was an RRB in Haryana, established on December 21, 2005, through the amalgamation of Haryana Kshetriya Gramin Bank (established on 02.10.1975), Hisar Sirsa Kshetriya Gramin Bank (established in 1984), and Ambala Kurukshetra Gramin Bank (established in 1985), all sponsored by Punjab National Bank. The Bank was operates in all districts of Haryana with its Head Office at Rohtak.

=== Gurgaon Gramin Bank (1976-2013) ===
The Gurgaon Gramin Bank was an RRB in Haryana, established in 1976, under the provisions of the Regional Rural Banks Act 1976. The bank was sponsored by the Syndicate Bank. Its head office was at Gurgaon.

== See also ==
- Regional rural bank
- List of banks in India
- Public sector banks in India
- Banking in India
- Reserve Bank of India
- Indian Financial System Code
- Make in India
- List of largest banks
- List of companies of India
