= Seeloo =

Village in Jammu and Kashmir, India

Seeloo, also known as Seelu, is a small village in Baramulla district, Jammu and Kashmir, India. The village is situated on the Srinagar-Kupwara national highway and is located on the banks of the Pohru River. Seeloo is made up of the mohallas, Tilwanpora A, Tilwanpora B, Al-umar, Sidiq Colony, Hanjipora, Naikpora, Bhat Mohalla, Hajam Mohalla, Mohalla Mehmood Abad, Sheikh ul Aalam Coloney & Baba Ismaiel coloney and High Land Colony. According to the Indian Census of 2011, the population of Seeloo is 4,400+.

== Facilities ==
Seeloo is Centre of almost fifteen villages. The village has a relatively large market, power station, allopathic and homoeopathic public health centre, Cricket ground and a fire and emergency service station.

As of 2016, a business unit of Jammu and Kashmir Bank (including an ATM) and a branch of Baramulla Central Cooperative bank operated there.

Seeloo is business hub in the area and has various business sectors viz: Automobile sector, Electric sector, restaurants and has all types of shops.

== Education ==
Seeloo has a Government Boys Middle School, Government Girls Middle School and a Government High School as well as some private schools, namely Shah Faisal Memorial school, Rehmat-E-Aalam Educational Trust Seelu . Apart from this, Seeloo has some welfare committees, and they are; Human Welfare Organization (Bait ul Maal) and Aufaaq Board and Civil Society Seeloo.

This village has produced a lot of Doctors, IT professional, Nursing professionals, Professors, Researchers, Engineers etc.
