= Regional Rural Bank =

Government banks at regional level

Regional Rural Banks (RRBs)
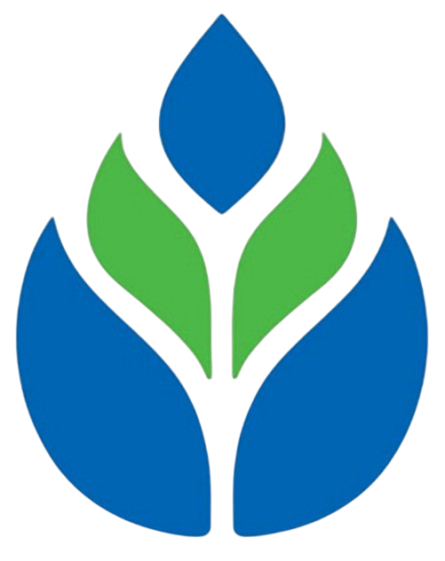
- Type: Government owned banks
- Industry: Banking, financial services
- Founded: 2 October 1975; 51 years ago
- Number of locations: 23078
- Products: Retail banking, corporate banking, investment banking, mortgage loans, wealth management, debit cards, UPI, internet banking, mobile banking, finance and insurance
- Owner: Government of India (50%), nationalised banks (35%), state governments (15%)
- Parent: Ministry of Finance, Government of India

The Regional Rural Banks (RRBs) are government owned scheduled commercial banks of India that operate at the regional level in different states of India. These banks are under the ownership of the Ministry of Finance, Government of India, Sponsored Bank and concerned State Government in the ratio of 50:35:15 respectively. They were created to serve rural areas with basic banking and financial services. However, RRBs also have urban branches.

The Government of India enacted the Regional Rural Banks Act in 1976, which led to the establishment of the first five RRBs on 2 October 1975. The first RRB was Prathama Bank, which was sponsored by Syndicate Bank and had its headquarters in Moradabad, Uttar Pradesh.

The area of operation is limited to the area notified by the government of India covering, and it covers one or more districts in the State. RRBs perform various functions such as providing banking facilities to rural and semi-urban areas, carrying out government operations like disbursement of wages of MGNREGA workers and distribution of pensions, providing para-banking facilities like locker facilities, debit and credit cards, mobile banking, internet banking, and UPI services. There are currently 28 Regional Rural Banks across India; the 'One State-One RRB' strategy, which aims to rationalize costs and streamline operations by consolidating 43 RRBs into 28 banks, it was put into action by the finance ministry from May 1, 2025.

== History ==
Regional rural banks were established under the provisions of an ordinance passed on 26 September 1975 and the RRB Act 1976 to provide sufficient banking and credit facility for agriculture and other rural sectors. As a result, five RRBs were set up on 2 October 1975 on the recommendations of the Narsimhan Committee on Rural Credit, during the tenure of Indira Gandhi's government. The purpose was to include rural areas into the economic mainstream since around 70% of the Indian population was rural.

Prathama Bank, with head office in Moradabad, Uttar Pradesh was the first RRB. It was sponsored by Syndicate Bank and had an authorized capital of Rs. 5 crore. The other four RRBs were Gaur Gramin Bank (sponsored by UCO Bank), Gorakhpur Kshetriya Gramin Bank (sponsored by State Bank of India), Haryana Kshetriya Gramin Bank (sponsored by Punjab National Bank), and Jaipur-Nagaur Anchalik Gramin Bank (sponsored by UCO Bank).

The RRBs were owned by the central government, state government, and the sponsoring bank with 50%, 15%, and 35% shareholding respectively.

== Recapitalization ==
A review of the RRBs in August 2009 by the Union Finance Minister revealed that a large number of RRBs had a low Capital to Risk weighted Assets Ratio (CRAR). A committee was constituted in September 2009 under the chairmanship of K C Chakrabarty, the deputy governor of the Reserve Bank of India (RBI) to analyse the financials of the RRBs and suggest measures, including re-capitalisation to bring the CRAR of RRBs to at least 9% in a sustainable manner by 2012. The committee submitted its report in May 2010.

The committee recommended RRBs to have a CRAR of at least 7% on 31 March 2011 and at least 9% from 31 March 2012 onwards. The recapitalization requirement of Rs 2,200.00 crore for 40 of the 82 RRBs were to be released in two installments in 2010–11 and 2011–12. The remaining 42 RRBs will not require any capital and will be able to maintain CRAR of at least 9% as of 31 March 2012 and thereafter, on their own. A fund of ₹100 crore to be set up for training and capacity building of the RRB staff.

The Government of India approved the recapitalization of the RRBs to improve their CRAR in the following manner:

- Share of central government, that is, ₹1,100 crore will be released as per provisions made by the Department of Expenditure in 2010-11 and 2011–12. However, release of the funds will be contingent on proportionate release of the state government and sponsor bank share.
- A capacity building fund with a corpus of ₹100 crore to be set up by central government with NABARD for training and capacity building of the RRB staff in the institution of NABARD and other reputed institutions. The functioning of the fund will be periodically reviewed by the central government. An action plan will be prepared by NABARD and sent to the government for approval.
- An additional amount of ₹700 crore was set up as a contingency fund to meet the requirement of the weak RRBs, particularly those in the north-eastern and the eastern region.

== Organizational structure ==
=== Amalgamation ===
RRBs periodically go through a process of amalgamation. In January 2013, 25 RRBs were amalgamated into 10 RRBs, totaling 67 RRBs. In March 2016, there were 56 RRBs, covering 525 districts with a network of 14,494 branches. In April 2020, there were 43 RRBs. As of 1 May 2025, there are 28 RRBs covering with a network of 22,966 branches in India.

== Legal significance ==
RRBs are recognized by the law and they have legal significance. The Regional Rural Banks Act, 1976 Act No. 21 of 1976 [9 February 1976.] reads:

For the incorporation, regulation and winding up of Regional Rural Banks with a view to developing the rural economy by providing, for the purpose of development of agriculture, trade, commerce, industry and other productive activities in the rural areas, credit and other facilities, particularly to the small and marginal farmers, agricultural laborers, artisans and small entrepreneurs, and for matters connected therewith and incidental thereto.

== List of RRBs ==
There are 28 regional rural banks in India, as of 1 October 2026.

State	Bank name	Established	Headquarters	Branches	Sponsor bank	Official Website
Andhra Pradesh	Andhra Pradesh Grameena Bank	2025	Guntur, Andhra Pradesh	1,365	Union Bank of India	https://apgb.bank.in
Arunachal Pradesh	Arunachal Pradesh Rural Bank	1983	Itanagar, Arunachal Pradesh	38	State Bank of India	https://aprb.bank.in
Assam	Assam Gramin Bank	2019	Guwahati, Assam	464	Punjab National Bank	https://agvb.bank.in
Bihar	Bihar Gramin Bank	2025	Patna, Bihar	2,885	Punjab National Bank	https://bgb.bank.in
Chhattisgarh	Chhattisgarh Gramin Bank	2013	Raipur, Chhattisgarh	629	State Bank of India	https://cgb.bank.in
Gujarat	Gujarat Gramin Bank	2025	Vadodara, Gujarat	745	Bank of Baroda	https://ggb.bank.in
Haryana	Haryana Gramin Bank	2013	Rohtak, Haryana	698	Punjab National Bank	http://hgb.bank.in
Himachal Pradesh	Himachal Pradesh Gramin Bank	2013	Mandi, Himachal Pradesh	278	Punjab National Bank	https://hpgb.bank.in
Jammu And Kashmir	Jammu and Kashmir Grameen Bank	2025	Jammu, Jammu and Kashmir	330	Jammu & Kashmir Bank	https://jkgrameen.bank.in
Jharkhand	Jharkhand Gramin Bank	2019	Ranchi, Jharkhand	463	State Bank of India	https://jrgbank.bank.in
Karnataka	Karnataka Grameena Bank	2025	Ballari, Karnataka	1,751	Canara Bank	https://karnatakagb.bank.in
Kerala	Kerala Grameena Bank	2013	Malappuram, Kerala	635	Canara Bank	https://kgb.bank.in
Madhya Pradesh	Madhya Pradesh Gramin Bank	2025	Indore, Madhya Pradesh	1,321	Bank of India	https://mpgb.bank.in
Maharashtra	Maharashtra Gramin Bank	2025	Chhatrapati Sambhajinagar, Maharashtra	759	Bank of Maharashtra	https://mahagramin.bank.in
Manipur	Manipur Rural Bank	1981	Imphal, Manipur	28	Punjab National Bank	https://manipurrural.bank.in
Meghalaya	Meghalaya Rural Bank	1981	Shillong, Meghalaya	90	State Bank of India	https://megrb.bank.in
Mizoram	Mizoram Rural Bank	1983	Aizawl, Mizoram	106	State Bank of India	https://mrb.bank.in
Nagaland	Nagaland Rural Bank	1983	Kohima, Nagaland	14	State Bank of India	https://www.nrb.bank.in https://nrb.bank.in
Odisha	Odisha Grameen Bank	2025	Bhubaneswar, Odisha	979	Indian Overseas Bank	https://odishabank.bank.in
Puducherry	Puducherry Grama Bank	2008	Pondicherry, Puducherry	48	Indian Bank	https://pygb.bank.in
Punjab	Punjab Gramin Bank	2019	Kapurthala, Punjab	479	Punjab National Bank	https://pgb.bank.in
Rajasthan	Rajasthan Gramin Bank	2025	Jaipur, Rajasthan	1,596	State Bank of India	https://rgb.bank.in
Tamil Nadu	Tamil Nadu Grama Bank	2019	Salem, Tamil Nadu	704	Indian Bank	https://tngb.bank.in
Telangana	Telangana Grameena Bank	2025	Hyderabad, Telangana	944	State Bank of India	https://tgb.bank.in
Tripura	Tripura Gramin Bank	1976	Agartala, Tripura	149	Punjab National Bank	https://tripuragramin.bank.in
Uttar Pradesh	Uttar Pradesh Gramin Bank	2025	Lucknow, Uttar Pradesh	4,330	Bank of Baroda	https://upgb.bank.in
Uttarakhand	Uttarakhand Gramin Bank	2012	Dehradun, Uttarakhand	290	State Bank of India	https://ukgb.bank.in
West Bengal	West Bengal Gramin Bank	2025	Berhampur,Murshidabad ,West Bengal	960	Punjab National Bank	https://wbgb.bank.in
