= K Moses Chalai =

Secretary in Ministry of Finance of India

K Moses Chalai IAS
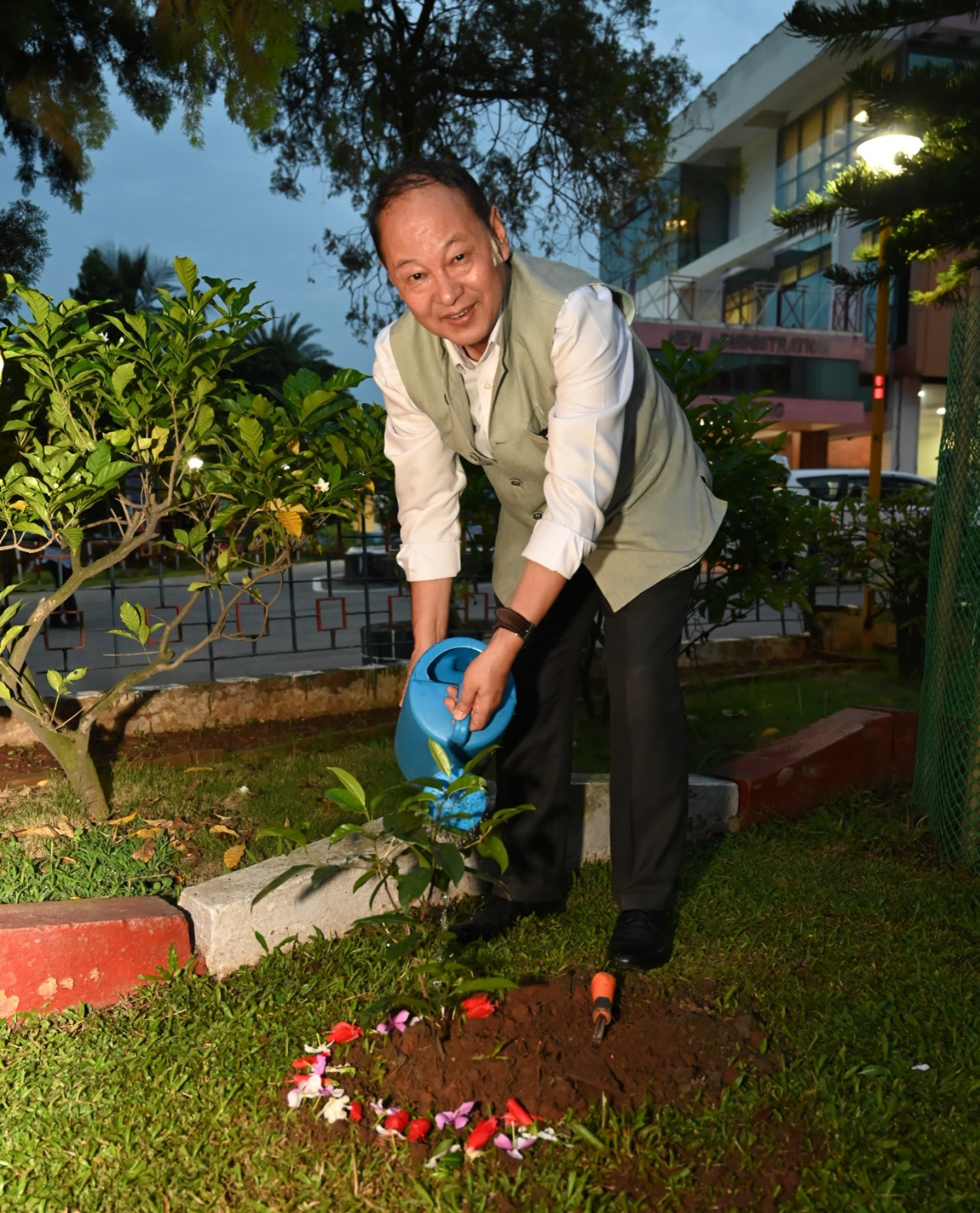

Secretary of Department of Public Enterprises Ministry of Finance of India
- Incumbent
- Assumed office 18 April 2025
- Appointed by: Appointments Committee of the Cabinet
- Preceded by: Ali Raza Rizvi

Secretary of Inter-State Council Secretariat of Ministry of Home Affairs of India
- In office 28 February 2024 – 18 April 2025
- Appointed by: Appointments Committee of the Cabinet
- Preceded by: Vumlunmang Vualnam
- Succeeded by: Ashish Srivastava

Secretary of North Eastern Council Ministry of Development of North Eastern Region
- In office 1 November 2019 – 4 February 2024
- Appointed by: Appointments Committee of the Cabinet
- Preceded by: Ram Muivah
- Succeeded by: Satinder Kumar Bhalla

Additional Secretary of Ministry of Women and Child Development
- In office 31 October 2019 – 22 April 2019
- Appointed by: Appointments Committee of the Cabinet

Personal details
- Born: 1 February 1968 (age 58) Senapati district, Manipur, India
- Education: (B.A.) (M.A.) Kirori Mal College; Delhi University
- Occupation: IAS officer
- Profession: Bureaucrat

K Moses Chalai (born 1 February 1968 ) is a 1990 batch IAS officer from Manipur cadre. He is currently serving as the Secretary of Department of Public Enterprises since April 2025. He hails from Mao Naga Community of Manipur.

== Early life and education ==
K Moses Chalai was born on 1 February 1968 in Senapati district of Manipur, India. He hails from Mao Naga Community, which is a Scheduled Tribe community in Manipur. He completed his Bachelor of Arts and Master of Arts both degrees in political science from Kirori Mal College of Delhi University.

== Civil Service career ==
Moses Chalai is an Indian Administrative Service officer of 1990 batch from the Manipur cadre. He has served in various positions in the Government of Manipur. As the principal secretary, he served in the Cooperative Department at the Agricultural Ministry of the Government of Manipur from 2012 to 2016. Before that, he had served as joint secretary in various ministries of the Government of Manipur, such as joint secretary in the Health and Family Welfare Ministry, and joint secretary in Human Resource Ministry of the state.

He has been on Central Deputation for central government since August 2016, where he first served as the joint secretary in Ministry of Women and Child Development and then as Additional Secretary in the same ministry in 2019.

From 2019 to 2024 he served as the secretary of North Eastern Council in Shillong under the Ministry of Development of North Eastern Region. His tenure in the region saw the implementation of various projects, such as the 5G Application initiative, digital designing, and Animation and Digital Tourism. Initiatives like NETMOS, NESAC projects, and 3D printing technology contributed to the growth of the region. He also played a crucial role in the establishment of the APJ Abdul Kalam Center for Policy Research and Analysis at IIM Shillong. He was also given a farewell ceremony by the council for his contributions. He then served as the Secretary of Inter-State Council in Home Affairs Ministry from 2024 to 2025.

In April 2025 he was appointed as the Secretary of the Department of Public Enterprises.

== See also ==
- Ministry of Finance (India)
- North Eastern Council
- Manipur
- Indian Administrative Service
