= List of banks in India =

This is a list of banks which are considered to be scheduled banks under the second schedule of Reserve Bank of India Act, 1934.

As of 1 August 2025, India's commercial banking sector consists of 12 public sector banks (PSBs), 21 private sector banks (PVBs), 28 regional rural banks (RRBs), 44 foreign banks (FBs), 12 small finance banks (SFBs), 5 payments banks (PBs), 2 local area banks (LABs), and 5 financial institutions. Out of these 128 commercial banks, 124 are classified as scheduled banks and four are classified as non-scheduled banks.

== Commercial banks ==
Top 15 banks in India by total assets
Bank	Total assets in crores (INR)
State Bank of India	7,444,291
HDFC Bank	4,392,417
ICICI Bank	2,642,241
Punjab National Bank	1,873,715
Bank of Baroda	1,839,671
Canara Bank	1,777,792
Axis Bank	1,656,962
Union Bank of India	1,497,882
Bank of India	1,056,425
Indian Bank	895,503
Kotak Mahindra Bank	879,774
IndusInd Bank	554,107
Central Bank of India	481,186
Yes Bank	424,115
Indian Overseas Bank	414,113

=== Public sector banks (PSBs) ===
There are 12 public sector banks in India, as of 1 October 2026.

Name	Established	Headquarters	Government shareholding	Domestic branches	Total assets	Revenues	Official Website	Refs
Bank of Baroda	1908	Vadodara, Gujarat	63.97%	8,650	₹1,971,175 crore (US$210 billion)	₹152,884.14 crore (US$16 billion)	https://bankofbaroda.bank.in	
Bank of India	1906	Mumbai, Maharashtra	73.38%	5,450	₹1,120,713.40 crore (US$120 billion)	₹80,412.44 crore (US$8.6 billion)	https://bankofindia.bank.in	
Bank of Maharashtra	1935	Pune, Maharashtra	73.60%	2,719	₹393,224 crore (US$42 billion)	₹28,401.62 crore (US$3.0 billion)	https://bankofmaharashtra.bank.in	
Canara Bank	1906	Bengaluru, Karnataka	62.93%	10,135	₹1,822,356.78 crore (US$190 billion)	₹152,657.89 crore (US$16 billion)	https://canarabank.bank.in	
Central Bank of India	1911	Mumbai, Maharashtra	81.19%	4,585	₹533,506.19 crore (US$57 billion)	₹39,667.95 crore (US$4.2 billion)	https://centralbank.bank.in	
Indian Bank	1907	Chennai, Tamil Nadu	73.84%	6,005	₹949,690.30 crore (US$100 billion)	₹72,050.88 crore (US$7.7 billion)	https://indianbank.bank.in	
Indian Overseas Bank	1937	Chennai, Tamil Nadu	92.44%	3,450	₹447,541.62 crore (US$48 billion)	₹33,750.31 crore (US$3.6 billion)	https://iob.bank.in	
Punjab and Sind Bank	1908	New Delhi, NCT of Delhi	93.85%	1,820	₹170,734 crore (US$18 billion)	₹13,048.95 crore (US$1.4 billion)	https://punjabandsind.bank.in	
Punjab National Bank	1894	New Delhi, NCT of Delhi	70.08%	10,360	₹1,976,227.84 crore (US$210 billion)	₹140,456.81 crore (US$15 billion)	https://pnb.bank.in	
State Bank of India	1806	Mumbai, Maharashtra	55.50%	23,125	₹7,881,070 crore (US$840 billion)	₹473,378.14 crore (US$51 billion)	https://sbi.bank.in	
UCO Bank	1943	Kolkata, West Bengal	90.95%	3,330	₹378,617.65 crore (US$40 billion)	₹29,473.55 crore (US$3.1 billion)	https://uco.bank.in	
Union Bank of India	1919	Mumbai, Maharashtra	74.76%	8,800	₹1,499,855.67 crore (US$160 billion)	₹129,979.25 crore (US$14 billion)	https://unionbankofindia.bank.in	

=== Private sector banks (PVBs) ===
Private sector banks are banks where the majority of the bank's equity is owned by a private company or a group of individuals. They comply with the central bank guidelines yet have a unique financial system.

There are 21 private sector banks in India, as of 1 October 2026.

Bank name	Established	Headquarters	Branches	Total assets	Revenues	Official Website	Refs
Axis Bank	1993	Mumbai, Maharashtra	6,275	₹1,656,962.61 crore (US$180 billion)	₹137,989 crore (US$15 billion)	https://axis.bank.in	
Bandhan Bank	2015	Kolkata, West Bengal	1,985	₹191,476.29 crore (US$20 billion)	₹21,656 crore (US$2.3 billion)	https://bandhan.bank.in	
CSB Bank	1920	Thrissur, Kerala	872	₹47,836.27 crore (US$5.1 billion)	₹3,450 crore (US$370 million)	https://csb.bank.in	
City Union Bank	1904	Kumbakonam, Tamil Nadu	1000	₹77,623.21 crore (US$8.3 billion)	₹4,839 crore (US$520 million)	https://cityunionbank.bank.in	
DCB Bank	1930	Mumbai, Maharashtra	480	₹76,809.78 crore (US$8.2 billion)	₹3,916 crore (US$420 million)	https://dcb.bank.in	
Dhanlaxmi Bank	1927	Thrissur, Kerala	269	₹17,936.94 crore (US$1.9 billion)	₹1,072 crore (US$110 million)	https://dhan.bank.in	
Federal Bank	1931	Kochi, Kerala	1,650	₹360,151.91 crore (US$38 billion)	₹25,267 crore (US$2.7 billion)	https://federal.bank.in	
HDFC Bank	1994	Mumbai, Maharashtra	9,689	₹4,392,417.42 crore (US$470 billion)	₹205,000 crore (US$22 billion)	https://hdfc.bank.in	
ICICI Bank	1994	Mumbai, Maharashtra	7,608	₹2,642,241.41 crore (US$280 billion)	₹186,178.50 crore (US$20 billion)	https://icici.bank.in	
IDBI Bank	1964	Mumbai, Maharashtra	2,104	₹412,961.90 crore (US$44 billion)	₹24,803 crore (US$2.6 billion)	https://idbi.bank.in	
IDFC First Bank	2015	Mumbai, Maharashtra	1,155	₹393,357 crore (US$42 billion)	₹21,134 crore (US$2.3 billion)	https://idfcfirst.bank.in	
IndusInd Bank	1994	Mumbai, Maharashtra	3,136	₹554,107.11 crore (US$59 billion)	₹28,999 crore (US$3.1 billion)	https://indusind.bank.in	
Jammu & Kashmir Bank	1938	Srinagar, Jammu and Kashmir	1,019	₹169,423.54 crore (US$18 billion)	₹7,166 crore (US$770 million)	https://jkb.bank.in	
Karnataka Bank	1924	Mangaluru, Karnataka	964	₹120,960.45 crore (US$13 billion)	₹6,232 crore (US$670 million)	https://karnatakabank.bank.in	
Karur Vysya Bank	1916	Karur, Tamil Nadu	921	₹119,367.42 crore (US$13 billion)	₹5,470 crore (US$580 million)	https://kvb.bank.in	
Kotak Mahindra Bank	2003	Mumbai, Maharashtra	2148	₹879,774.34 crore (US$94 billion)	₹94,274 crore (US$10 billion)	https://kotak.bank.in	
Nainital Bank	1922	Nainital, Uttarakhand	173	₹9,306 crore (US$990 million)	₹727 crore (US$78 million)	https://nainitalbank.bank.in	
RBL Bank	1943	Mumbai, Maharashtra	628	₹146,772.11 crore (US$16 billion)	₹8,561 crore (US$910 million)	https://rbl.bank.in	
South Indian Bank	1929	Thrissur, Kerala	959	₹124,655.07 crore (US$13 billion)	₹7,305 crore (US$780 million)	https://southindianbank.bank.in	
Tamilnad Mercantile Bank	1921	Thoothukkudi, Tamil Nadu	626	₹66,449.87 crore (US$7.1 billion)	₹3,992 crore (US$430 million)	https://tmb.bank.in	
Yes Bank	2004	Mumbai, Maharashtra	1,255	₹424,115.93 crore (US$45 billion)	₹20,039 crore (US$2.1 billion)	https://yes.bank.in	

=== Regional rural banks (RRBs) ===
There are 28 regional rural banks in India, as of 1 October 2026.

State	Bank name	Established	Headquarters	Branches	Sponsor bank	Official Website
Andhra Pradesh	Andhra Pradesh Grameena Bank	2025	Guntur, Andhra Pradesh	1,351	Union Bank of India	https://apgb.bank.in
Arunachal Pradesh	Arunachal Pradesh Rural Bank	1983	Itanagar, Arunachal Pradesh	34	State Bank of India	https://aprb.bank.in
Assam	Assam Gramin Bank	2019	Guwahati, Assam	473	Punjab National Bank	https://agvb.bank.in
Bihar	Bihar Gramin Bank	2025	Patna, Bihar	2,885	Punjab National Bank	https://bgb.bank.in
Chhattisgarh	Chhattisgarh Gramin Bank	2013	Raipur, Chhattisgarh	626	State Bank of India	https://cgb.bank.in
Gujarat	Gujarat Gramin Bank	2025	Vadodara, Gujarat	744	Bank of Baroda	https://ggb.bank.in
Haryana	Haryana Gramin Bank	2013	Rohtak, Haryana	690	Punjab National Bank	https://hgb.bank.in/
Himachal Pradesh	Himachal Pradesh Gramin Bank	2013	Mandi, Himachal Pradesh	265	Punjab National Bank	https://hpgb.bank.in
Jammu And Kashmir	Jammu and Kashmir Grameen Bank	2025	Jammu, Jammu and Kashmir	330	Jammu & Kashmir Bank	https://jkgrameen.bank.in
Jharkhand	Jharkhand Gramin Bank	2019	Ranchi, Jharkhand	450	State Bank of India	https://jrgbank.bank.in
Karnataka	Karnataka Grameena Bank	2025	Ballari, Karnataka	1,750	Canara Bank	https://karnatakagb.bank.in
Kerala	Kerala Grameena Bank	2013	Malappuram, Kerala	635	Canara Bank	https://kgb.bank.in
Madhya Pradesh	Madhya Pradesh Gramin Bank	2025	Indore, Madhya Pradesh	1,320	Bank of India	https://mpgb.bank.in
Maharashtra	Maharashtra Gramin Bank	2025	Chhatrapati Sambhajinagar, Maharashtra	748	Bank of Maharashtra	https://mahagramin.bank.in
Manipur	Manipur Rural Bank	1981	Imphal, Manipur	28	Punjab National Bank	https://manipurrural.bank.in
Meghalaya	Meghalaya Rural Bank	1981	Shillong, Meghalaya	89	State Bank of India	https://meghalayaruralbank.bank.in
Mizoram	Mizoram Rural Bank	1983	Aizawl, Mizoram	105	State Bank of India	https://mrb.bank.in
Nagaland	Nagaland Rural Bank	1983	Kohima, Nagaland	12	State Bank of India	https://nrb.bank.in
Odisha	Odisha Grameen Bank	2025	Bhubaneswar, Odisha	979	Indian Overseas Bank	https://odishabank.bank.in
Puducherry	Puducherry Grama Bank	2008	Pondicherry, Puducherry	48	Indian Bank	https://pygb.bank.in
Punjab	Punjab Gramin Bank	2019	Kapurthala, Punjab	458	Punjab National Bank	https://pgb.bank.in
Rajasthan	Rajasthan Gramin Bank	2025	Jaipur, Rajasthan	1,596	State Bank of India	https://rgb.bank.in
Tamil Nadu	Tamil Nadu Grama Bank	2019	Salem, Tamil Nadu	682	Indian Bank	https://tngb.bank.in
Telangana	Telangana Grameena Bank	2025	Hyderabad, Telangana	934	State Bank of India	https://tgb.bank.in
Tripura	Tripura Gramin Bank	1976	Agartala, Tripura	154	Punjab National Bank	https://tripuragramin.bank.in
Uttar Pradesh	Uttar Pradesh Gramin Bank	2025	Lucknow, Uttar Pradesh	4,330	Bank of Baroda	https://upgb.bank.in
Uttarakhand	Uttarakhand Gramin Bank	2012	Dehradun, Uttarakhand	291	State Bank of India	https://ukgb.bank.in
West Bengal	West Bengal Gramin Bank	2025	Kolkata, West Bengal	960	Punjab National Bank	https://wbgb.bank.in

== Co-operative banks ==
=== State co-operative banks (SCBs) ===
There are 34 state co-operative banks in India, as of 1 August 2025.

- The Andaman and Nicobar State Co-operative Bank Ltd.
- The Andhra Pradesh State Co-operative Bank Ltd.
- The Arunachal Pradesh State Co-operative Apex Bank Ltd.
- The Assam Co-operative Apex Bank Ltd.
- The Bihar State Co-operative Bank Ltd.
- The Chandigarh State Co-operative Bank Ltd.
- The Chhattisgarh Rajya Sahakari Bank Maryadit
- The Delhi State Co-operative Bank Ltd.
- The Goa State Co-operative Bank Ltd.
- The Gujarat State Co-operative Bank Ltd.
- The Haryana State Co-operative Apex Bank Ltd.
- The Himachal Pradesh State Co-operative Bank Ltd.
- The Jammu and Kashmir State Co-operative Bank Ltd.
- The Jharkhand State Co-operative bank Ltd.
- The Karnataka State Co-operative Apex Bank Ltd.
- The Kerala State Co-operative Bank Ltd.
- The Madhya Pradesh Rajya Sahakari Bank Maryadit.
- The Maharashtra State Co-operative Bank Ltd.
- The Manipur State Co-operative Bank Ltd.
- The Meghalaya Co-operative Apex Bank Ltd.
- The Mizoram Co-operative Apex Bank Ltd.
- The Nagaland State Co-operative Bank Ltd.
- The Odisha State Co-operative Bank Ltd.
- The Pondichery State Co-operative Bank Ltd.
- The Punjab State Co-operative Bank Ltd.
- The Rajasthan State Co-operative Bank Ltd.
- The Sikkim State Co-operative Bank Ltd.
- The Tamil Nadu State Apex Co-operative Bank Ltd.
- The Telangana State Co-operative Apex Bank Ltd.
- The Tripura State Co-operative Bank Ltd.
- The Uttar Pradesh Co-operative Bank Ltd.
- The Uttaranchal Rajya Sahakari Bank Ltd.
- The West Bengal State Co-operative Bank Ltd.
- The Daman and Diu State Co-operative Bank Ltd.

=== District central co-operative banks ===
There are 352 district central co-operative banks in India, as of 1 August 2025.

=== Scheduled urban co-operative banks ===
There are 24 scheduled urban co-operative banks in India, as of 1 August 2025.

=== Non-scheduled urban co-operative banks ===
There are 1407 non-scheduled urban co-operative banks in India, as of 1 August 2025.

== Foreign banks ==
There are 44 foreign banks in India, as of 1 October 2026. Branch/WOS/Representative form of presence as per RBI is as follows:

=== Foreign banks operating as wholly owned subsidiary in India ===
List of notable foreign banks which are incorporated outside India and are operating a wholly owned subsidiary in India:

- Singapore
  - DBS Bank
- Mauritius
  - SBM Bank India (State Bank of Mauritius)

=== Foreign banks with branches in India ===
List of notable foreign banks which are incorporated outside India and are operating branches in India:

- Australia
  - Australia & New Zealand Banking Group
- Bahrain
  - Bank of Bahrain and Kuwait
- Bangladesh
  - AB Bank
  - Sonali Bank
- Canada
  - Bank of Nova Scotia
- China
  - Bank of China
  - Industrial & Commercial Bank of China
- Denmark
  - Danske Bank
- England
  - Barclays
  - HSBC Bank India
  - Standard Chartered India
- France
  - BNP Paribas
  - Société Générale
  - Crédit Agricole Corporate and Investment Bank
- Germany
  - Deutsche Bank
- Indonesia
  - Bank Maybank Indonesia
- Japan
  - Mizuho Corporate Bank
  - MUFG Bank
  - Sumitomo Mitsui Banking Corporation
- Netherlands
  - Rabobank
- Qatar
  - Doha Bank
  - Qatar National Bank
- Russia
  - Sberbank
- Scotland
  - NatWest Group
- Singapore
  - United Overseas Bank
- South Africa
  - FirstRand Bank
- South Korea
  - Industrial Bank of Korea
  - KEB Hana Bank
  - Kookmin Bank
  - Shinhan Bank
  - Woori Bank
- Sri Lanka
  - Bank of Ceylon
- Sweden
  - Handelsbanken
- Switzerland
  - UBS
- Taiwan
  - CTBC Bank
- Thailand
  - Krung Thai Bank
- United Arab Emirates
  - Abu Dhabi Commercial Bank
  - Emirates NBD
  - First Abu Dhabi Bank
- United States of America
  - American Express
  - Bank of America
  - JPMorgan Chase

=== Foreign banks with representative offices in India ===
List of notable foreign banks which are incorporated outside India and are operating representative offices in India:

- Australia
  - National Australia Bank
- Austria
  - Raiffeisen Bank International
- Canada
  - Bank of Montreal
  - Toronto Dominion Bank
- France
  - Credit Industriel et Commercial
  - Natixis
- Germany
  - DZ Bank
- Italy
  - Banco BPM
  - Intesa Sanpaolo
- Nigeria
  - Access Bank
- Norway
  - DNB Bank
- Portugal
  - Caixa Geral de Depositos
- Russia
  - Gazprombank
- Spain
  - Banco Bilbao Vizcaya Argentaria
  - Banco de Sabadell
- Sweden
  - Skandinaviska Enskilda Banken
- Switzerland
  - UBS AG
  - Zurcher Kantonalbank
- South Korea
  - Busan Bank
- Taiwan
  - Bank of Taiwan
- United States
  - The Bank of New York Mellon
  - Wells Fargo Bank

== Local area banks ==
Local area banks are non-scheduled banks. They were set up with the twin objectives of providing an institutional mechanism for promoting rural and semi-urban savings and for providing credit for viable economic activities in local areas. They were established as public limited companies in the private sector. They are promoted either by individuals, corporates, trusts or societies. The minimum paid up capital of such banks is ₹50 million. The promoter's contribution should be at least ₹20 million. Local area banks can operate and open branches in a maximum of 3 geographically contiguous districts. They are governed by the provisions of the Reserve Bank of India Act, 1934, the Banking Regulation Act, 1949 and other relevant statutes. They are to be registered as Public Limited Companies under the Companies Act 1956. Since they are non-scheduled banks, they cannot borrow funds from the Reserve Bank of India, like other scheduled commercial banks.

There are 2 local area banks in India, as of 1 October 2026.

Bank name	Established	Headquarters	Branches	Revenues	Official Website	Refs
Coastal Local Area Bank	1999	Vijayawada, Andhra Pradesh	50	₹25 crore (US$2.7 million)	https://coastal.bank.in	
Krishna Bhima Samruddhi Local Area Bank	2001	Hyderabad, Telangana	29	₹67.89 crore (US$7.3 million)	https://www.kbsbank.bank.in	

== Payments banks ==
There are 5 payments banks in India, as of 1 October 2026.

Bank name	Established	Headquarters	Branches	Revenues	Official Website	Refs
Airtel Payments Bank	2017	New Delhi, NCT of Delhi	1	₹3,207 crore (US$340 million)	https://airtelpayments.bank.in	
Fino Payments Bank	2017	Navi Mumbai, Maharashtra	71	₹2,248 crore (US$240 million)	https://fino.bank.in	
India Post Payments Bank	2018	New Delhi, NCT of Delhi	650	₹2,000 crore (US$210 million)	https://ippbonline.bank.in	
Jio Payments Bank	2018	Mumbai, Maharashtra	1	₹204 crore (US$22 million)	https://jiopayments.bank.in	
NSDL Payments Bank	2018	Mumbai, Maharashtra	1	₹95 crore (US$10 million)	https://nsdlpayments.bank.in	

== Small finance banks ==
There are 12 small finance banks in India, as of 1 October 2026.

Bank name	Established	Headquarters	Branches	Total assets	Revenues	Official Website	Refs
AU Small Finance Bank	2017	Jaipur, Rajasthan	1930	₹109,426 crore (US$12 billion)	₹9,293 crore (US$990 million)	https://au.bank.in	
Capital Small Finance Bank	2016	Jalandhar, Punjab	275	₹9,295 crore (US$990 million)		https://capital.bank.in	
Equitas Small Finance Bank	2016	Chennai, Tamil Nadu	990	₹45,304 crore (US$4.8 billion)	₹3,997 crore (US$430 million)	https://equitas.bank.in	
ESAF Small Finance Bank	2017	Thrissur, Kerala	805	₹26,086.88 crore (US$2.8 billion)	₹475 crore (US$51 million)	https://esaf.bank.in	
Jana Small Finance Bank	2018	Bengaluru, Karnataka	650	₹32,710 crore (US$3.5 billion)	₹3,050 crore (US$330 million)	https://jana.bank.in	
Shivalik Small Finance Bank	2021	New Delhi, NCT of Delhi	80	₹4,119.76 crore (US$440 million)		https://shivalik.bank.in	
Slice Small Finance Bank	2017	Guwahati, Assam	240	₹1,687 crore (US$180 million)		https://slice.bank.in	
Suryoday Small Finance Bank	2017	Navi Mumbai, Maharashtra	695	₹15,614.4 crore (US$1.7 billion)		https://suryoday.bank.in	
Ujjivan Small Finance Bank	2017	Bengaluru, Karnataka	815	₹40,422 crore (US$4.3 billion)	₹4,754 crore (US$510 million)	https://ujjivansfb.bank.in	
Unity Small Finance Bank	2021	New Delhi, NCT of Delhi	350	₹13,774 crore (US$1.5 billion)		https://unity.bank.in	
Utkarsh Small Finance Bank	2018	Varanasi, Uttar Pradesh	950	₹23,903 crore (US$2.6 billion)		https://utkarsh.bank.in	

== See also ==
- Banking in India
- Defunct banks of India
- Indian Financial System Code
- List of largest banks
- List of companies of India
- Make in India
- Reserve Bank of India
