= Mizoram Rural Bank =

Regional Rural Bank in Mizoram

- Logo used since December 2025
- Type: Regional Rural Bank
- Industry: Banking, Financial services
- Founded: September 27, 1983; 42 years ago
- Headquarters: Aizawl, Mizoram, India, India
- Number of locations: 105 Branches
- Area served: Mizoram
- Key people: Sheryl L Vanchhong (Chairman)
- Products: Retail banking; Corporate banking; Mortgage loans; Insurance
- Services: Financial services; Banking
- Owner: Government of India (50%) Government of Mizoram (15%) State Bank of India (35%)
- Parent: Ministry of Finance, Government of India
- Website: mrb.bank.in; inb.mrb.bank.in/OnlineMZGB/

Mizoram Rural Bank (MRB) is a Regional Rural Bank in Mizoram sponsored by State Bank of India. It is under the ownership of Ministry of Finance, Government of India.

== History ==
It was established on 27 September 1983 under the Regional Rural Bank Act, 1976 and is the only Bank having presence in all districts of Mizoram. Mizoram Rural Bank started using core banking only in February 2011.

== Operation ==
Mizoram Rural bank has 106 branches, covering all the 11 districts and 26 RD blocks. The Bank is headquartered in Aizawl.

== See also ==
- Banking in India
- List of banks in India
- Reserve Bank of India
- Regional Rural Bank
- Indian Financial System Code
- List of largest banks
- List of companies of India
- Make in India
