= V. M. Chatram =

- suburban
- Location in Tamil Nadu, India
- Coordinates: 8.7049°N 77.7695°E
- Country: India
- State: Tamil Nadu
- District: Tirunelveli

Government
  - Type: Municipality
  - Body: Tirunelvel Municipal Corporation

Languages
  - Official: Tamil
- Time zone: UTC+5:30 (IST)
- Postal code: 627011

V. M. Chatram or Vijayaragava Mudaliar Chatram is a rapidly developing suburban area located in the Tirunelveli district of Tamil Nadu, South India. V. M. Chatram, which was previously a Village Panchayat, was upgraded to a ward of the Tirunelveli Municipal Corporation since June 1, 1994. The settlements/areas adjacent to/near V. M. Chatram, which is fast becoming an urban area, are V. O. C. Nagar, Srinivasa Nagar, Adithanar Nagar, and T. V. S. Nagar.

== Educational Institutions ==
The schools located in V. M. Chatram are:

- Panchayat Union Primary School
- R. C. Primary School, Arokiyanathapuram
- Rose Mary Matriculation Higher Secondary School
- Oasis Matriculation Higher Secondary School, Tuticorin Road
- St. Joseph's High School, Arokiyanathapuram
- St. Antony's Public School
- Rose Mary Public School

== Places of Worship ==
- Muppidathi Amman Temple
- Thalayai Madasamy Kovil (Temple)
- Karaiyadi Sudalai Kovil (Temple)
- Thadiveera Swamy Kovil (Temple)
- Pathrakali Amman Temple
- Ramar Temple
- Pillaiyar Kovil (Ganesh Temple)
- R. C. Church (Roman Catholic Church)

== Public Library ==
A government public library is functioning in V. M. Chatram. It is very helpful to the students and youth in the area. The library also organizes events such as seminars and debates on books.

== Banks ==
- Tamil Nadu Grama Bank
- Indian Bank (K. T. C. Nagar)

=== Automated Teller Machine (ATM) ===
- Indian Bank
- Tamilnad Mercantile Bank
- State Bank of India
- Canara Bank
- City Union Bank

== Ponds/Tanks ==
The water sources for V. M. Chatram are Nochchikulam, Moorthinainarkulam, and Peerkkankulam. These tanks provide irrigation to approximately 40 acres of agricultural land. Vegetable crops, including brinjal (eggplant), okra (lady's finger), and ash gourd (winter melon), as well as crops like paddy (rice) and banana, are cultivated here.

== Solid Waste Management ==
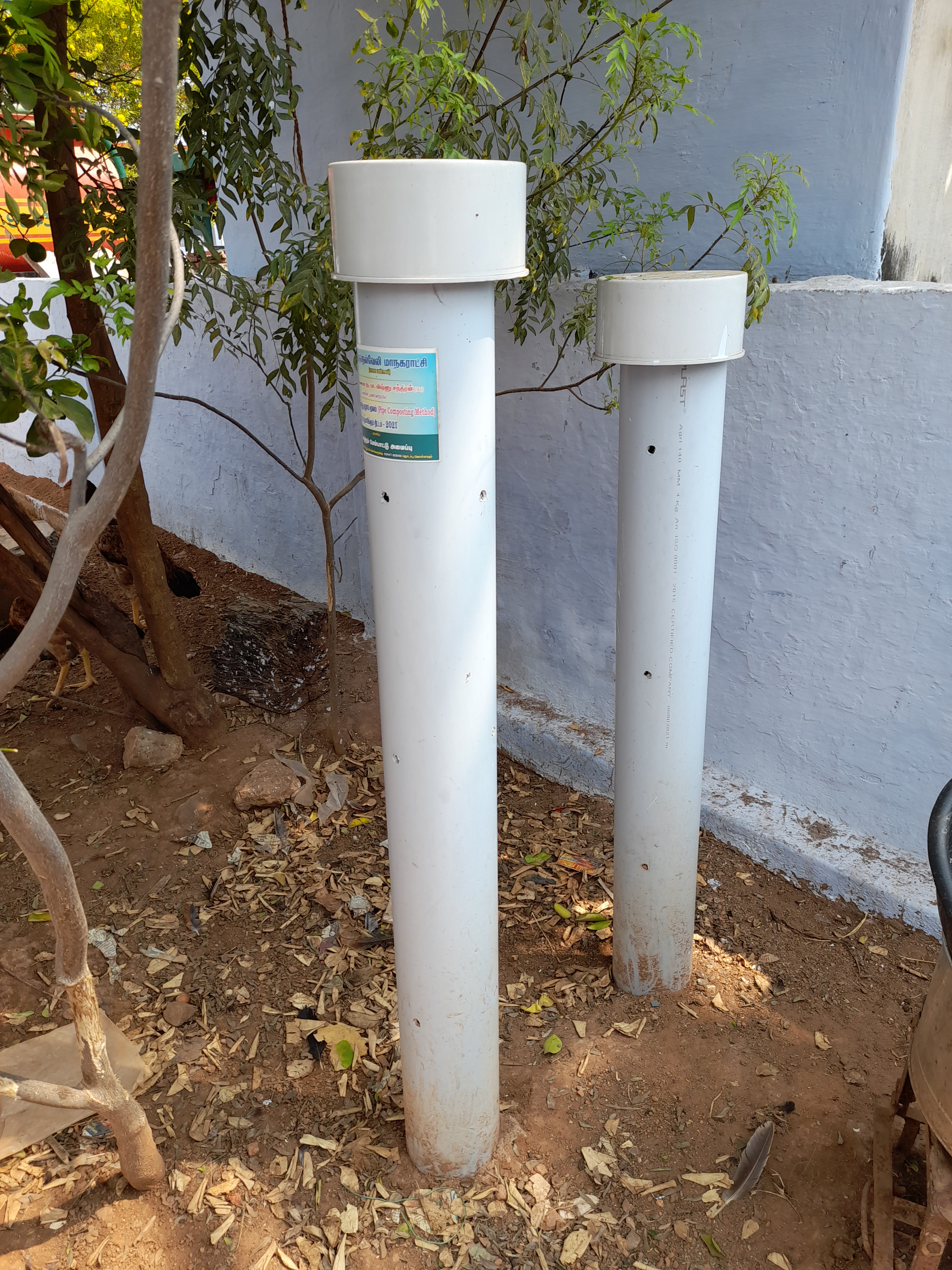

The project for composting waste within homes, which is being implemented across the Tirunelveli Corporation area, has been initially introduced in the V. M. Chatram localities. Under this project, it has been recommended that a 5-foot-tall PVC pipe be buried near the homes of approximately 150 households in this area, and organic waste collected in the homes be filled into it. The waste placed in this manner will transform into natural manure (compost) within 45 days.

== Miyawaki forest ==
A Miyawaki forest has been created near the Moorthinainar Kulam in V. M. Chatram, covering an area of approximately 2,000 square feet. About 120 varieties of saplings have been planted in this Miyawaki -forest. It is noteworthy to mention that this was established by the V. M. Chatram Development Organisation, a non-governmental voluntary organization.
