= Jammu and Kashmir Grameen Bank =

Regional Rural Bank in Jammu and Kashmir, India

- Native name: जम्मू एवं कश्मीर ग्रामीण बैंक
- Type: Regional Rural Bank
- Industry: Financial; Regional Rural Banks
- Predecessor: J&K Grameen Bank Ellaquai Dehati Bank
- Founded: May 1, 2025; 17 months ago
- Headquarters: Jammu, Jammu And Kashmir, India
- Number of locations: 330 Branches
- Area served: Jammu And Kashmir, Ladakh
- Key people: Mr. Lalit Parkash (Chairman)
- Products: Retail banking; Corporate banking; Mortgage loans; Private banking; Insurance
- Services: Financial services; Banking
- Owner: Government of India (50%) Government of Jammu and Kashmir (15%) Jammu & Kashmir Bank (35%)
- Parent: Ministry of Finance, Government of India
- Website: www.jkgrameen.bank.in; onlinebanking.jkgrameen.bank.in

The Jammu and Kashmir Grameen Bank (JKGB) is an Indian Regional Rural Bank (RRB) in UT of Jammu And Kashmir and in UT of Ladakh established on 1 May 2025. The bank was formed by the amalgamation of J&K Grameen Bank and Ellaquai Dehati Bank under The "One State, One RRB" policy of government. It currently has 330 branches in UTs of Jammu And Kashmir and Ladakh.

It functions under Regional Rural Banks' Act 1976 and is sponsored by Jammu & Kashmir Bank.

== History ==
=== J&K Grameen Bank ===
J&K Grameen Bank(JKGB) was an Indian Regional Rural Bank headquartered in Jammu, Jammu and Kashmir India. It was established in 2009 as a Regional Rural Bank as per Regional Rural Banks Act of 1976. By amalgamation, on 30th June 2009, of the following 2 banks, Jammu Rural Bank and Kamraz Rural Bank both sponsored by Jammu & Kashmir Bank with its Head Office at Narwal, Jammu, vide GoI notification under Sub section (i) of Section 23-A of the RRB Act 1976 (21 of 1976) and commenced its business from 01.07.2009. Bank is having share holding of 50% by Govt. of India, 35% from the Sponsor Bank (J&K Bank) & 15% from Govt. of J&K (Union Territory). The operational area of the Bank covers thirteen (13) Districts, i.e. 11 Districts in the Union Territory (UT) of Jammu & Kashmir and 2 Districts in the UT of Ladakh. The network of the Bank consists of Six Regional Offices and 216 branches i.e. 212 branches in the UT of Jammu & Kashmir and 4 branches in the UT of Ladakh. It is under the ownership of Ministry of Finance, Government of India.

=== Ellaquai Dehati Bank ===
Ellaquai Dehati Bank was an Indian Regional Rural Bank headquartered in Shrinagar, India. It was established on 16th july 1979 as a Regional Rural Bank as per Regional Rural Banks Act of 1976. It is sponsored by SBI. Government of India, State Bank of India, and Government of Jammu & Kashmir are the joint owners of the Bank. The Bank has its presence in both the divisions of the Union Territory and has at present a network of 110 Branches and 3 extension counters spread across thirteen districts of the Union Territory (Srinagar, Budgam, Ganderbal, Anantnag, Pulwama, Shopian, Kulgam, Jammu, Udhampur, Reasi, Ramban, Doda, and Samba). It was under the ownership of Ministry of Finance, Government of India. Sh. Fayaz Ahmad Wani was the chairman of the bank at the time of amalgamation.

== Logo ==
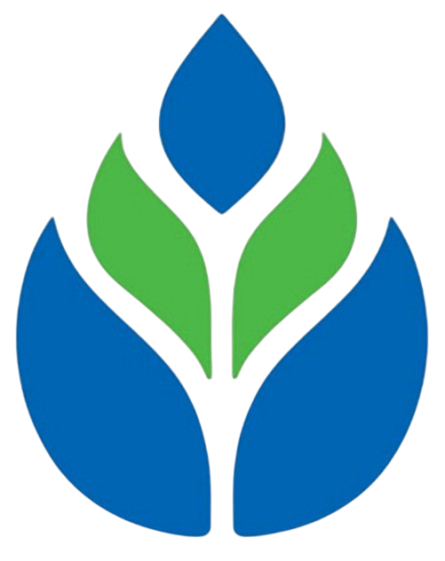
RRB logo used since August 1, 2025

The identity boasts symmetry, stability and craftsmanship.

Key elements include

- Upward Arrow, symbolizing Progress and Growth
- Hands, embodying Nurturing and Care
- Flame, symbolizing enlightentment and warmth

The Regional Rural Bank logo selection process involved a public poll conducted by NABARD in June 2025 to choose a new, common logo for the amalgamated Regional Rural Banks in India, the initiative aimed at creating a unified brand identity for rural banking after the amalgamation of several RRBs. the poll allowed participants to vote on six logo concepts and nine design variations. The initiative was called OneRRBOneLogo reflecting the vision of having a single identity for the RRBs.

== Branch Network ==
The network of the Bank consists of Eight Regional Offices and 330 branches i.e. 326 branches in the UT of Jammu & Kashmir and 4 branches in the UT of Ladakh.

== See also ==
- List of banks in India
- Regional rural bank
- Public sector banks in India
