= Maharashtra Gramin Bank =

Regional Rural Bank in Maharashtra, India

- Native name: महाराष्ट्र ग्रामीण बँक
- Type: Regional Rural Bank
- Industry: Financial; Regional Rural Banks
- Predecessor: Maharashtra Gramin Bank; Vidarbha Konkan Gramin Bank
- Founded: May 1, 2025; 16 months ago
- Headquarters: Chhatrapati Sambhajinagar, India
- Number of locations: 748 Branches
- Area served: Maharashtra
- Key people: Shri Gharad MB (Chairman)
- Products: Retail banking; Corporate banking
- Services: Financial services; Banking
- Owner: Government of India (50%) Government of Maharashtra (15%) Bank of Maharashtra (35%)
- Parent: Ministry of Finance, Government of India
- Website: www.mahagramin.bank.in; mgbconnect.in/MGB/login

The Maharashtra Gramin Bank (Marathi: महाराष्ट्र ग्रामीण बँक) is an Indian Regional Rural Bank (RRB) in Maharashtra with its head office is in Chhatrapati Sambhajinagar established on 1 May 2025. The bank was formed by the amalgamation of Maharashtra Gramin Bank and Vidarbha Konkan Gramin Bank under The "One State, One RRB" policy of government. It currently has 748 branches in rural areas of Maharashtra. It is under the ownership of Ministry of Finance, Government of India.

It functions under Regional Rural Banks' Act 1976 and is sponsored by Bank of Maharashtra.

== Board of directors ==
- Shri Girish Thorat, Chairman
- Shri Manoj Kare, GM, FI & SLBC, Bank of Maharashtra HO Pune
- Mr. Anil Kumar Rawat, DGM NABARD
- Shri Jino Jeya Singh DGM, Financial inclusion RBI Mumbai
- Shri VM Nachane, Zonal Manager, Chh. Sambhajinagar, Bank of Maharashtra

== See also ==
- Banking in India
- List of banks in India
- Reserve Bank of India
- Regional Rural Bank
- Indian Financial System Code
- List of largest banks
- List of companies of India
- Make in India
