= Telangana Grameena Bank =

Regional Rural Bank in Telangana, India

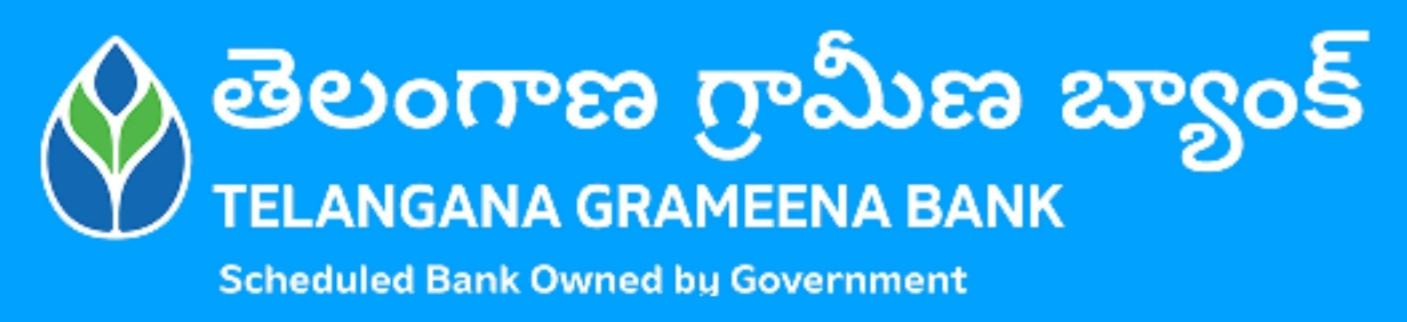
- Native name: తెలంగాణ గ్రామీణ బ్యాంక్
- Type: Regional Rural Bank
- Industry: Financial; Regional Rural Banks
- Founded: 1 January 2025; 20 months ago
- Headquarters: Hyderabad, Telangana, India
- Number of locations: 936 Branches
- Area served: Telangana
- Key people: Shi K Prathapa Reddy (Chairman)
- Products: Retail banking; Corporate banking; Mortgage loans; Private banking; Insurance
- Services: Financial services; Banking
- Owner: Government of India (50%) Government of Telangana (15%) State Bank of India (35%)
- Parent: Ministry of Finance, Government of India
- Website: tgb.bank.in; inb.tgb.bank.in/OnlineTGB/

The Telangana Grameena Bank (TGB) is an Indian Regional Rural Bank (RRB) in Telangana. The bank was established on 1 January 2025 The bank was formed by the amalgamation of Telangana Grameena Bank and the branches of Andhra Pradesh Grameena Vikas Bank (APGVB) in Telangana under The "One State, One RRB" policy of government which aims to consolidate Regional Rural Banks (RRBs) within each state, resulting in a single RRB per state. This policy, effective from 1 May 2025, is designed to improve efficiency, reduce operational costs, and strengthen rural banking services.

It functions under Regional Rural Banks' Act 1976 and is sponsored by State Bank of India.

== History ==
The recent amalgamation involves merging the branches of Andhra Pradesh Grameena Vikas Bank (APGVB) in Telangana with Telangana Grameena Bank (TGB), effective 1 January 2025.

== Branches and coverage ==
The bank operates in multiple districts of Telangana, with its head office located at Hyderabad.

== See also ==
- List of banks in India
- Regional rural bank
