= Odisha Grameen Bank =

Regional Rural Bank in Odisha, India

- Native name: ଓଡ଼ିଶା ଗ୍ରାମୀଣ ବ୍ୟାଙ୍କ
- Type: Regional Rural Bank
- Industry: Financial; Regional Rural Banks
- Predecessor: Odisha Gramya Bank; Utkal Grameen Bank
- Founded: May 1, 2025; 17 months ago
- Headquarters: Bhubaneswar, Odisha, India
- Number of locations: 979 Branches
- Area served: Odisha State
- Key people: Shri Rishi Singh (Chairman)
- Products: Rupay Debit card, consumer banking, corporate banking, finance and insurance, Home loans, investment banking, mortgage loans, private banking, Vehicle loan, wealth management
- Services: Financial services; Banking
- Owner: Government of India (50%) Government of Odisha (15%) Indian Overseas Bank (35%)
- Number of employees: 3408
- Parent: Ministry of Finance, Government of India
- Website: odishabank.bank.in; ebank.ogb.bank.in/RetailBanking/

The Odisha Grameen Bank (OGB) (Odia: ଓଡ଼ିଶା ଗ୍ରାମୀଣ ବ୍ୟାଙ୍କ) is an Indian Regional Rural Bank (RRB) operating in Odisha state established on 1 May 2025. The bank was formed by the amalgamation of Odisha Gramya Bank and Utkal Grameen Bank under The "One State, One RRB" policy of government. It currently has 979 branches in rural areas of Odisha. It functions under Regional Rural Banks' Act 1976 and is sponsored by IOB.

It is under the ownership of Ministry of Finance, Government of India. The Bank is headquartered at Bhubaneswar and currently it operates in all 30 Districts of Odisha having 979 branches. Odisha Grameen Bank is a scheduled commercial bank and included in the Second Schedule of the Reserve Bank of India Act, 1934

== History ==
=== Odisha Gramya Bank ===
Odisha Gramya Bank (OGB) (Odia: ଓଡ଼ିଶା ଗ୍ରାମ୍ୟ ବ୍ୟାଙ୍କ) was a Regional Rural Bank established on 7 January 2013 with the amalgamation of Neelachala Gramya Bank (Odia: ନୀଳାଚଳ ଗ୍ରାମ୍ୟ ବ୍ଯାଙ୍କ), Kalinga Gramya Bank (Odia: କଳିଙ୍ଗ ଗ୍ରାମ୍ୟ ବ୍ଯାଙ୍କ) and Baitarani Gramya Bank (Odia: ବୈତରଣୀ ଗ୍ରାମ୍ୟ ବ୍ଯାଙ୍କ) in terms of provisions of Regional Rural Banks Act 1976. The bank was sponsored by Indian Overseas Bank & was jointly owned by the Government of India, Government of Odisha and IOB. It was under the ownership of Ministry of Finance, Government of India. The Bank was operating in 13 districts of Odisha State with its Head Office at Bhubaneswar. The bank had 549 branches and 9 regional offices at the time of amalgamation

=== Utkal Grameen Bank ===
Utkal Grameen Bank (UGB) (Odia: ଉତ୍କଳ ଗ୍ରାମୀଣ ବ୍ୟାଙ୍କ) was a Regional Rural Bank established on 1 November 2012 with the merger of Rushikulya Gramya Bank and Utkal Gramya Bank in terms of provisions of Regional Rural Banks Act 1976. The bank was sponsored by State Bank of India & is jointly Owned by the Government of India, Government of Odisha.It was under the ownership of Ministry of Finance, Government of India. The Bank is operating in 17 districts of Odisha State with its Head Office at Bolangir. Besides, the bank has seven Regional Offices in western and southern Odisha. It subsequently grew to a network of 442 branches, of which 360 are in remote rural areas.

== Logo ==
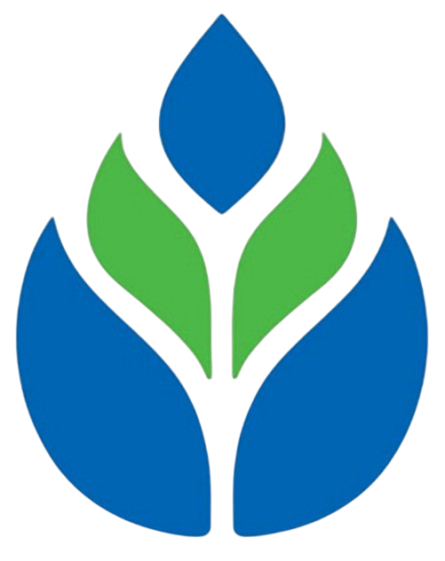
RRB logo used since August 1, 2025

The identity boasts symmetry, stability and craftsmanship.

Key elements include

- Upward Arrow, symbolizing Progress and Growth
- Hands, embodying Nurturing and Care
- Flame, symbolizing enlightentment and warmth

The Regional Rural Bank logo selection process involved a public poll conducted by NABARD in June 2025 to choose a new, common logo for the amalgamated Regional Rural Banks in India, the initiative aimed at creating a unified brand identity for rural banking after the amalgamation of several RRBs. the poll allowed participants to vote on six logo concepts and nine design variations. The initiative was called OneRRBOneLogo reflecting the vision of having a single identity for the RRBs.

== Etymology ==
Earlier names of Regional Rural Banks were based on rivers, mountains or historical names. However, under One State One RRBs policy in order to consolidate RRBs, amalgamation of different RRBs under one state was carried out. The name Odisha Grameen Bank was chosen because Odisha is the modern name of Odisha State and also to avoid confusion with different names such as Utkal.

== See also ==
- List of banks in India
- Regional rural bank
- Banking in India
- Reserve Bank of India
- Indian Financial System Code
- List of largest banks
- Make in India
- Utkal Grameen Bank
