= Jammu & Kashmir Bank =

Indian bank

Jammu and Kashmir Bank Limited

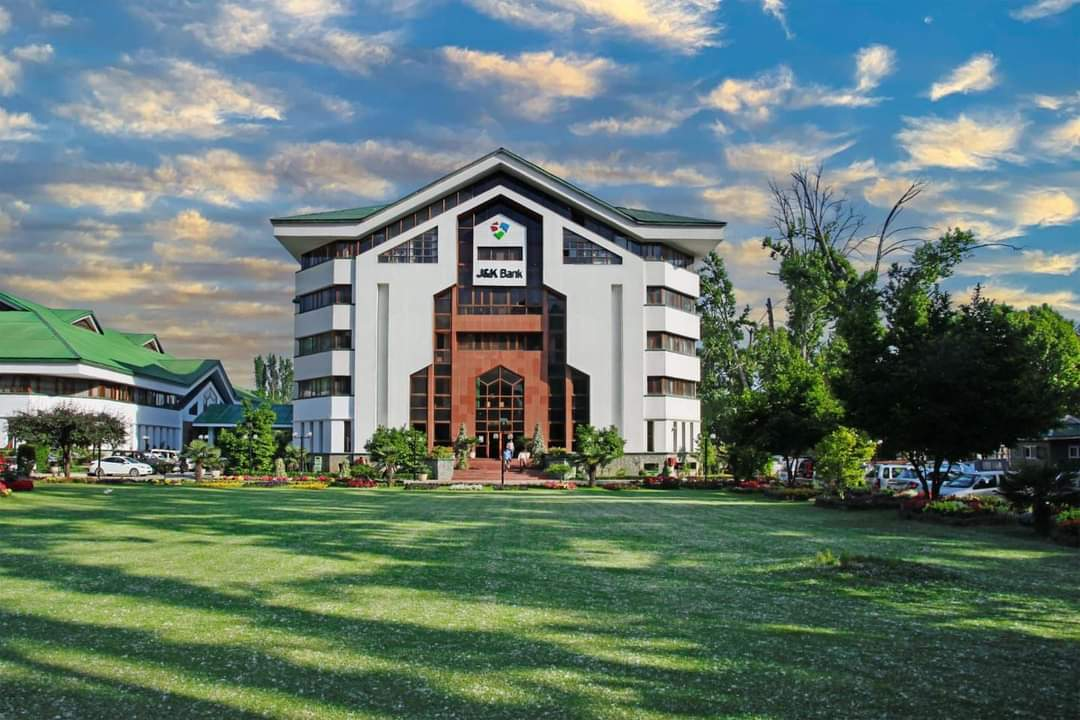
- J&K Bank corporate headquarters in Srinagar
- Type: Public
- Traded as: NSE: J&KBANK; BSE: 532209
- Industry: Banking; Financial services
- Founded: 1 October 1938; 87 years ago
- Founder: Mahraja Hari Singh
- Headquarters: Srinagar, Jammu and Kashmir, India
- Key people: Amitava Chatterjee (MD & CEO); Sudhir Gupta (Executive Director); Rakesh Magotra (Group Compliance Officer); Altaf Hussain Kira (Chief Risk Officer); Mohammad Shafi Mir (Company Secretary); Ketan Kumar Joshi (Chief Financial Officer)
- Products: Corporate banking; Retail banking; Treasury; Transport loan; Personal loan and insurance; Credit cards; Debit cards
- Revenue: ▲₹12,051 crore (US$1.3 billion) (2024)
- Operating income: ▲₹2,250 crore (US$230 million) (2024)
- Net income: ▲₹1,770 crore (US$180 million) (2024)
- Total assets: ▲₹169,468 crore (US$18 billion) (2024)
- Owner: Government of Jammu and Kashmir
- Number of employees: 12,415 (2024)
- Capital ratio: 12.20%
- Website: jkb.bank.in

Jammu & Kashmir Bank Limited (J&K Bank) is an Indian banking and financial services company, headquartered in Srinagar, Jammu and Kashmir. The Jammu and Kashmir Bank was incorporated on 1 October 1938, by the then ruler of the princely state of Jammu and Kashmir Maharaja Hari Singh. As of March 2024, the governments of Union territories of Jammu and Kashmir and Ladakh hold a majority stake of 59.4% in the bank.

== History ==
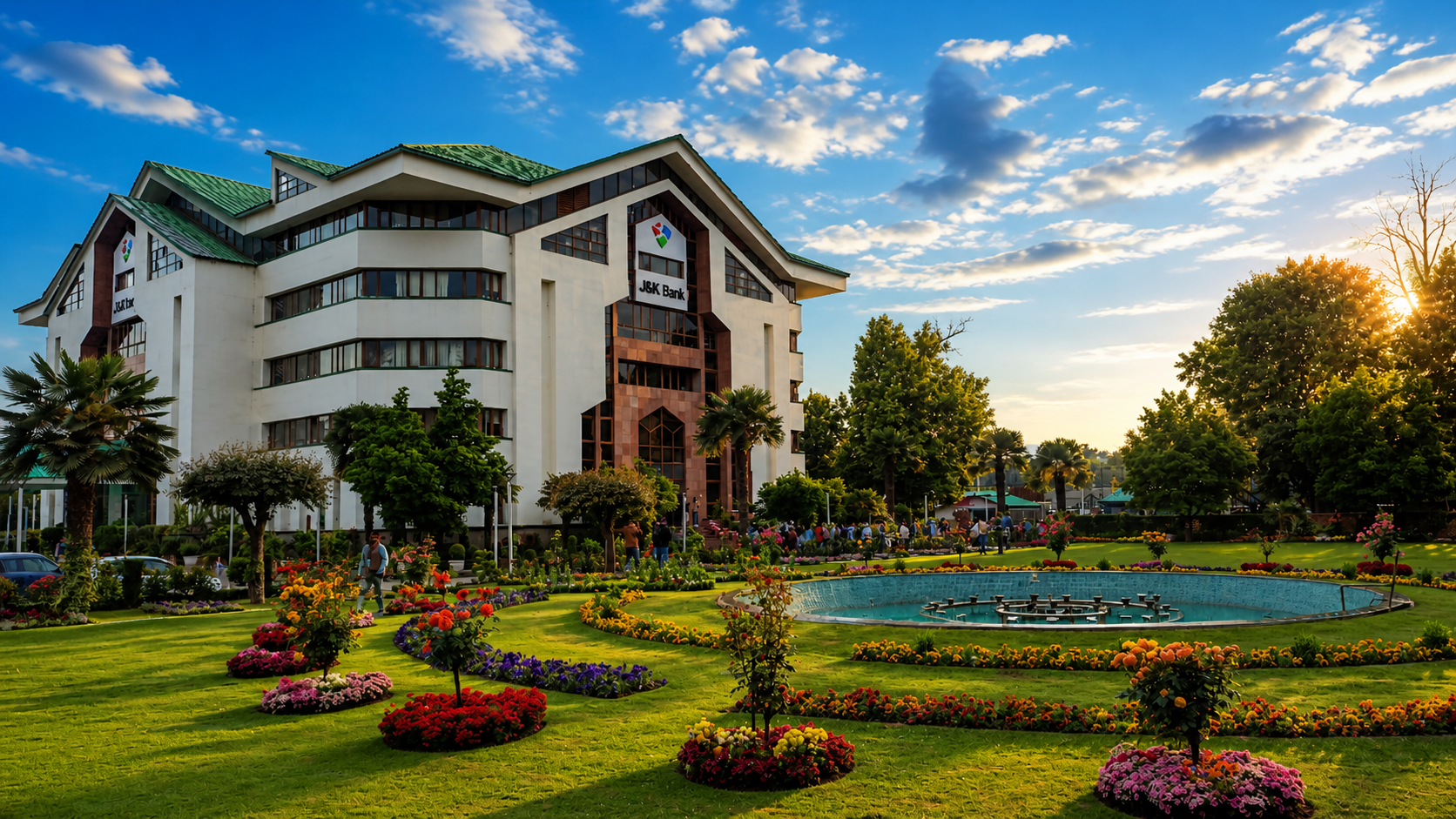
The corporate headquarters of J&K Bank, in Srinagar

J&K Bank was founded on 1 October 1938, under letters patent issued by the then Maharaja of Jammu & Kashmir, Maharaja Hari Singh.

Maharaja of Parmar Rajputs was invited as an investor by Maharaja of Jammu & Kashmir, Maharaja Hari Singh to become founding director and shareholders of the bank.

The bank commenced banking business on 4 July 1939 and was considered the first of its nature and composition as a state-owned bank in the country. The bank was established as a semi-state bank with participation in capital by state and the public under the control of state government.

After the Indo-Pakistani War of 1947–1948, the princely state of Jammu and Kashmir was divided and two branches of the bank out of the then 10 branches viz. Muzaffarabad Rawalkot and Mirpur (now in Azad Kashmir administered by Pakistan) fell to the other side of the Line of Control along with cash and other assets.

The bank is defined as a government company under the Indian Companies Act, 2013. In 1971, the bank acquired the status of a scheduled bank and was declared an ‘A’ class bank by Reserve Bank of India in 1976.

== Milestones ==
The bank celebrated its platinum jubilee in 2013. In that year, the bank achieved a total business of ₹1000 billion and earned a net profit of ₹10 billion.

On 1 October 2018, the bank completed its 80 years of existence and a campaign under the theme “80 years of bonding – I pledge to strengthen it” was launched.

On 1 July 2019, the bank surpassed a deposit base of ₹1000 billion with over 10 million customers.

In July 2020, the bank ranked within the top four financial institutions in India for successfully meeting digital payment targets under the ‘Digital India’ mission.

In August 2024, rating of bank was upgraded by India Ratings – a Fitch Group company and one of the india's leading rating agencies . Company in its report upgraded the long term issuer rating of the bank from INDA+ to INDAA- with a stable outlook for long term .

== Network ==
As of 31 December 2025, the bank maintains a network of around 5000 touch points - 1008 branches, 1436 ATMs, 169 CRMs and 99 Ultra Small Branches known as Easy Banking Units (EBUs), distributed across 18 states and 4 Union Territories. 835 of the branches are in the Union Territory of Jammu & Kashmir and 37 are in the Union Territory of Ladakh and 136 branches outside the UTs of J&K and Ladakh.

Within the Union Territories of J&K and Ladakh, the bank operates a total of 99 Easy Banking Units (EBUs). 36 of these EBUs are situated in the Union Territory of Ladakh, while the rest operate in the Union Territory of Jammu & Kashmir.

Jammu and Kashmir bank has a four layered architecture viz., Division, Zone, Cluster & Branch. Bank works in layers, that is, geographically, the bank has divided the area under its jurisdictions into three Divisions viz., Kashmir Division (includes UT of Ladakh), Jammu Division & Rest of India Division (ROI) headed by Divisional Heads. The Divisions are divided into Zones headed by Zonal Heads. Further these zones are divided into clusters which are headed by cluster heads. These clusters are divided in Branches which are headed by Branch Managers who report to Cluster Heads/Zonal Heads.Kashmir division has 6 zonal offices and 17 cluster offices, Jammu division has 5 zonal offices and 13 cluster offices while rest of india consists of 2 zonal offices and 5 cluster offices.

== Subsidiaries ==
J&K Bank provides investment & stock broking through its wholly owned subsidiary JKB Financial Services Limited (JKBFSL). It has 12 branches (5 Branches in Kashmir, 6 Branches in Jammu and 1 Branch in Gurgaon) besides having sales desks at 61 J&K Bank branches across the Union Territory of J&K.

== Regional Rural Bank ==
J&K Bank serves as the sponsoring bank for Jammu and Kashmir Grameen Bank, holding a substantial 35% equity share. Jammu and Kashmir Grameen Bank focuses on delivering a comprehensive range of financial services within the Union Territories of Jammu & Kashmir and Ladakh. Commencing operations on 1 May 2025, the Regional rural bank operates across all 20 districts in the Union Territory of Jammu & Kashmir, in addition to 2 districts within the Union Territory of Ladakh.

== Tie-ups ==
The bank partners with various national as well as multinational companies to promote and operate its financial services. Under Bancassurance, the bank collaborates with PNB Metlife to offer life insurance products, and joined forces with Bajaj Allianz and IFFCO Tokio to provide non-life insurance solutions. The bank also established partnerships with Tata Motors, Mahindra & Mahindra and Maruti Suzuki to market and offer its financial services.

Bank has also signed corporate agency agreement with LIC through which bank will service and solicit LIC’s life insurance products through its branch network.

== See also ==
- Banking in India
- List of banks in India
- Reserve Bank of India
- Indian Financial System Code
