= Gujarat Gramin Bank =

Regional Rural Bank in Gujarat, India

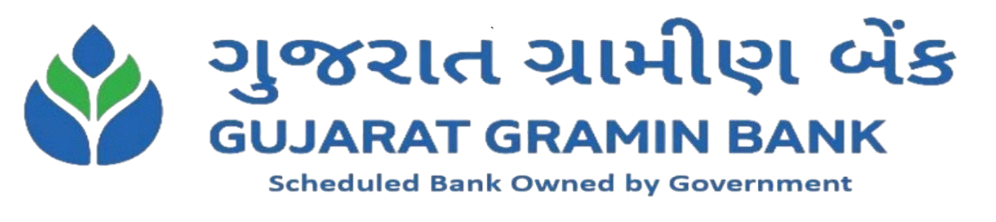
- Native name: ગુજરાત ગ્રામીણ બેંક
- Type: Regional Rural Bank
- Industry: Financial; Regional Rural Banks
- Predecessor: Baroda Gujarat Gramin Bank; Saurashtra Gramin Bank
- Founded: May 1, 2025; 17 months ago
- Headquarters: Vadodara, Gujarat, India
- Number of locations: 745 Branches
- Area served: Gujarat
- Key people: Mr. Yogesh Agrawal (Chairman)
- Products: Retail banking; Corporate banking; Mortgage loans; Private banking; Insurance
- Services: Financial services; Banking
- Owner: Government of India (50%) Government of Gujarat (15%) Bank of Baroda (35%)
- Parent: Ministry of Finance, Government of India
- Website: ggb.bank.in; ggbib.ggb.bank.in

The Gujarat Gramin Bank (Gujarati: ગુજરાત ગ્રામીણ બેંક) is an Indian Regional Rural Bank (RRB) in Gujarat established on 1 May 2025. The bank was formed by the amalgamation of Baroda Gujarat Bank and Saurashtra Gramin Bank under The "One State, One RRB" policy of government. It currently has 745 branches in rural areas of Gujarat.

It functions under Regional Rural Banks' Act 1976 and is sponsored by Bank of Baroda.

== See also ==
- List of banks in India
- Regional rural bank
