= Tripura Gramin Bank =

Indian regional rural bank

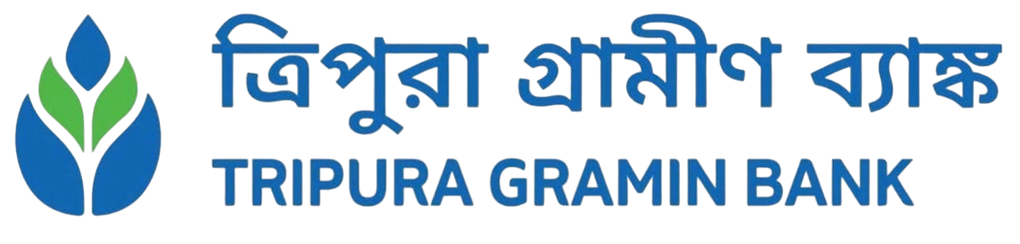
- Native name: त्रिपुरा ग्रामीण बैंक ত্রিপুরা গ্রামীণ ব্যাঙ্ক
- Company type: Regional Rural Bank
- Industry: Banking, financial services
- Founded: 21 December 1976; 49 years ago
- Headquarters: Agartala, India
- Number of locations: 154
- Area served: Tripura State
- Key people: Satyendra Singh (Chairman )
- Products: Retail banking, corporate banking, investment banking, mortgage loans, private banking, wealth management
- Owner: Government of India (50%); Government of Tripura (15%); Punjab National Bank (35%)
- Parent: Ministry of Finance, Government of India
- Website: tripuragramin.bank.in; ibanking.tripuragramin.bank.in

Tripura Gramin Bank (TGB) is a Regional Rural Bank established on 21 December 1976 in terms of the provisions under the Regional Rural Banks Act 1976. The bank is sponsored by Punjab National Bank and is owned by Government of India (50% of Share Capital Deposit), Govt. of Tripura (15% of Share Capital Deposit) and Punjab National Bank (35% of Share Capital Deposit). TGB has total number of 154 operating branches in Eight District in Tripura. It is under the ownership of Ministry of Finance, Government of India.

The shareholders of the Bank are Government of India (50%), Punjab National Bank (35%) and Government of Tripura (15%). The Bank is operating in eight districts of Tripura State with its Head Office at Agartala. The bank has three Regional Offices functioning at Agartala (West Tripura), Udaipur (South Tripura) and Kailashahar (North Tripura).

== History ==
The bank was established on 21.12.1976 with only four branches (Agartala, Bishramganj, Bishalgarh & Jolaibari). However, presently it has grown to a network of 154 branches operating in eight districts in the State. In 2010, the bank launched its Core Banking Solution. ATM facility has now been extended to almost all branches & bank has launched Mobile Banking service in 4 May 2018.

== Logo ==
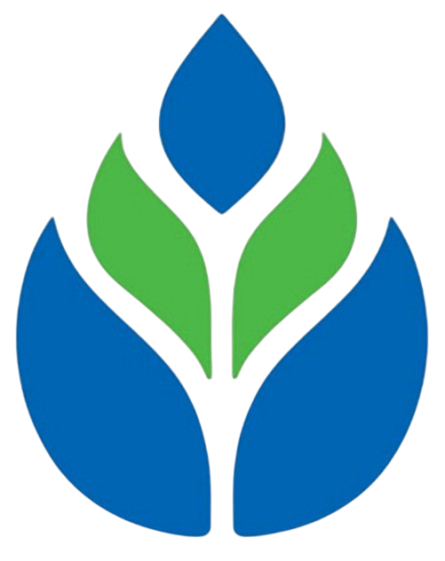
RRB logo used since December, 2025

The identity boasts symmetry, stability and craftsmanship. Key elements include

- Upward Arrow, symbolizing Progress and Growth
- Hands, embodying Nurturing and Care
- Flame, symbolizing enlightentment and warmth

The Regional Rural Bank logo selection process involved a public poll conducted by NABARD in June 2025 to choose a new, common logo for the amalgamated Regional Rural Banks in India, the initiative aimed at creating a unified brand identity for rural banking after the amalgamation of several RRBs. the poll allowed participants to vote on six logo concepts and nine design variations. The initiative was called OneRRBOneLogo reflecting the vision of having a single identity for the RRBs.

== Branches ==
Number	Dhalai District	Gomoti District	Khowai District	North Tripura District	Shepahijola District	South Tripura District	Unokati District	West Tripura District
1	CHAWMANU Branch	TAIDU Branch	MUNGIAKAMI Branch	JAMPUI HILLS Branch	MADHUPUR Branch	SABRUM Branch	MACHMARA Branch	AGARTALA Branch
2	CHAILANGTA Branch	AMPINAGAR Branch	TALIAMURA Branch	HMUNPUI Branch	BISHALGHAR OFFICE TILLA Branch	RUPAICHARI Branch	PACHARTHAL Branch	BARDOWALI Branch
3	MANU Branch	AMARPUR Branch	MOHARCHERRA Branch	DASDA Branch	BISHALGHAR Branch	HARINA Branch	PABIACHARRA Branch	M.B.TILLA Branch
4	NALKATA Branch	KARBOOK Branch	SOUTH PULINPUR Branch	KANCHANPUR Branch	DURGANAGAR Branch	SATCHAND Branch	BATCHERRA Branch	CAMPERBAZAR Branch
5	JAHARNAGAR Branch	SILACHARI Branch	KALYANPUR Branch	KHEDACHARRA Branch	VELUARCHAR Branch	MANUBAZAR Branch	KANCHAN BARI Branch	BADHARGHAT Branch
6	AMBASSA Branch	CHELLAGANG Branch	CHEBRI Branch	DAMCHERRA Branch	BOXANAGAR Branch	JOLAIBARI Branch	FATIKROY Branch	ABHOYNAGAR Branch
7	GANGANAGAR Branch	UDAIPUR Branch	KHOWAI Branch	JALEBASSA Branch	JAMPUIJALA Branch	BAIKHORA Branch	DALUGAON Branch	GURKHA BASTI Branch
8	GANDACHERRA Branch	CHANDRAPUR Branch	KHOWAI OFFICE TILLA Branch	PANISAGAR Branch	GOLAGHATI Branch	MUHURIPUR Branch	KAILASHAHAR Branch	NEW CAPITAL COMPLEX Branch
9	KULAI Branch	GARJEE Branch	CHAMPAHOUR Branch	TILTHAI Branch	LALSINGMURA Branch	SANTIRBAZAR Branch	TILLABAZAR Branch	NUTANNAGAR Branch
10	SALEMA Branch	TULAMURA Branch	RAMSANKARBARI Branch	DHARMANAGAR Branch	CHARILAM Branch	B.C.NAGAR Branch	GOURNAGAR Branch	NARSINGARH Branch
11	KACHUCHERRA Branch	GANGACHERRA Branch	PADMABILL Branch	HUPLONG Branch	HERMA Branch	BANKAR Branch		NEW KUNJABAN TOWNSHIP Branch
12	AVANGA Branch	KAKRABAN Branch	HATKATA Branch	RAJBARI Branch	BISHRAMGANJ Branch	BELONIA Branch		DHALESWAR Branch
13	KAMALPUR Branch	JAMJURI Branch	AMPURA Branch	KADAMTALA Branch	NALCHAR Branch	MATAI Branch		JOGENDRANAGAR Branch
14	BAMANCHERRA Branch	MAHARANI Branch		BHAGYAPUR Branch	MELAGHAR Branch	HRISHYAMUKH Branch		ARALIA Branch
15		KILLA Branch		CHURAIBARI Branch	DURLAVNARAYAN Branch	POANGBARI Branch		PRATAPGARH Branch
16		GAKULPUR Branch		SANICHERRA Branch	SONAMURA Branch	SRINAGAR Branch		M.G.BAZAR Branch
17		ATHARABOLA Branch		HURUA Branch	DHANPUR Branch	SOUTH SONAICHARI Branch		KHYERPUR Branch
18		BAGMA Branch			KANTHALIA Branch	BARPATHARI Branch		DEBINAGAR Branch
19					MANAIPATHAR Branch	DEBDARU Branch		MOHANPUR Branch
20						RAJNAGAR Branch		KHUMULWNG Branch
21						MANUGHAT Branch		BELBARI Branch
22								BANKIMNAGAR Branch
23								NIT AGARTALA Branch
24								MANDAI Branch
25								CHAMPAKNAGAR Branch
26								DURGABARI Branch
27								BAMUTIA Branch
28								KAMALGHAT Branch
29								KALACHERRA Branch
30								PANCHABATI Branch
31								MOHANPUR(SIDHAI) Branch
32								HEZAMARA Branch
33								LEFUNGA Branch
34								LEMBUCHERRA Branch
35								CORPORATION MARKET Branch
36								TGB HEAD OFFICE Branch
37								JOYNAGAR Branch
38								BIKRAMNAGAR Branch
39								DURGACHOWMOHONY BAZAR Branch
40								KANCHANMALA Branch

== See also ==
- Banking in India
- Indian Financial System Code
- List of banks in India
- List of companies of India
- List of largest banks
- Make in India
- Regional Rural Bank
- Reserve Bank of India
