= Jharkhand Gramin Bank =

Regional Rural Bank in Jharkhand, India

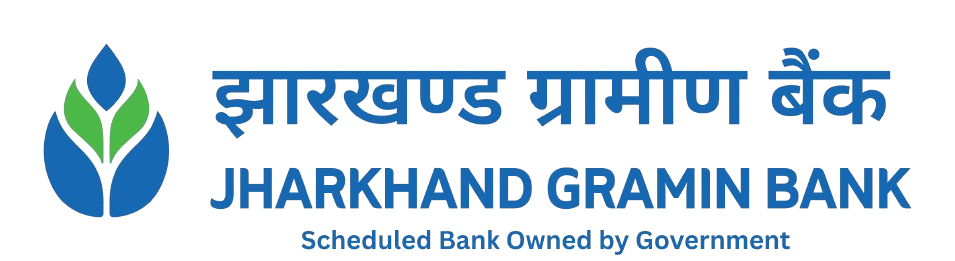
- Native name: झारखण्ड ग्रामीण बैंक
- Formerly: Jharkhand Rajya Gramin Bank (2019–2025)
- Type: Regional Rural Bank
- Industry: Financial; Regional Rural Banks
- Predecessor: Jharkhand Gramin Bank (2006-2019); Vananchal Gramin Bank (2006-2019)
- Founded: April 1, 2019; 7 years ago
- Headquarters: Ranchi, Jharkhand, India
- Number of locations: 463 Branches
- Area served: Jharkhand
- Key people: Mr. Madan Mohan Bariar (Chairman)
- Products: Credit cards, consumer banking, corporate banking, finance and insurance, investment banking, mortgage loans, private banking, private equity, wealth management
- Services: Financial services; Banking
- Owner: Government of India (50%) Government of Jharkhand (15%) State Bank of India (35%)
- Number of employees: 1525
- Parent: Ministry of Finance, Government of India
- Website: jrgbank.bank.in; inb.jrgbank.bank.in/JRGBOnline

The Jharkhand Gramin Bank (JGB Bank) is an Indian Regional Rural Bank (RRB) in Jharkhand established on 1 April 2019. The bank was formed by the amalgamation of Jharkhand Gramin Bank and Vananchal Gramin Bank. It currently has 463 branches in rural areas of Jharkhand.

It functions under Regional Rural Banks' Act 1976 and is sponsored by State Bank of India. It is under the ownership of Ministry of Finance, Government of India. It is sponsored by SBI & is jointly Owned by the Government of India, Government of Jharkhand and State Bank of India.

The shareholders of the Bank are Govt. of India (50%), State Bank of India (35%) and Govt. of Jharkhand (15%). The Bank is operating in all 24 districts of Jharkhand State with its Head Office at Ranchi (sub-capital of Jharkhand State ). The bank has eight Regional Offices functioning at Ranchi, Singhbhum, Gumla, Palamu, Hazaribagh, Giridih, Deoghar & Godda.

== History ==
Jharkhand Gramin Bank (JGB Bank) is one of the prominent Regional rural banks in India.

=== Jharkhand Rajya Gramin Bank (2019-2025) ===
In April 2019, Vananchal Gramin Bank was amalgamated with Jharkhand Gramin Bank to form Jharkhand Rajya Gramin Bank(JRG Bank).

On October 23, 2025, Ministry of Finance, Government of India announce the renaming of several Regional Rural Banks (RRBs) to simplify their names and align them with their states. Changes include Jharkhand Rajya Gramin Bank(JRG Bank) becoming Jharkhand Gramin Bank(JGB Bank) and several others being renamed after requests from their sponsor banks. The functional jurisdiction and operations of these banks remain unchanged.

=== Vananchal Gramin Bank (2006-2019) ===
Vananchal Gramin Bank was a Regional Rural Bank (RRB) in Jharkhand, India, Established on June 30, 2006, through the amalgamation of Santhal Parganas Gramin Bank and Palamau Kshetriya Gramin Bank. It was sponsored by the State Bank of India. The Bank is operating in 9 districts of Jharkhand State with its Head Office at Dumka (sub-capital of Jharkhand State ). It has four Regional Offices

=== Jharkhand Gramin Bank (2006-2019) ===
Jharkhand Gramin Bank was a Regional Rural Bank (RRB) in Jharkhand, India, Established on June 30, 2006, through the amalgamation of Bihar Gramin Bank and Banka Gramin Bank. It was sponsored by the Bank of India.

== See also ==
- List of banks in India
- Regional rural bank
