= Bank of Maharashtra =

Indian public sector bank

- Type: Public
- Traded as: BSE: 532525; NSE: MAHABANK
- ISIN: INE457A01014
- Industry: Banking; Financial services
- Founded: 16 September 1935; 91 years ago
- Headquarters: Lokmangal, 1501, Shivajinagar, Pune, Maharashtra, India
- Number of locations: 2,641 branches (June 2025)
- Key people: Nidhu Saxena (Managing Director & CEO)
- Services: Consumer banking, Corporate banking, Financial services, Investment banking, Mortgage loans, Private banking, Wealth management
- Revenue: ▲₹28,401 crore (US$2.9 billion) (FY25)
- Net income: ▲₹5,519 crore (US$570 million) (FY25)
- Total assets: ▲₹369,354 crore (US$38 billion) (2025)
- Total equity: ▲₹113,834 crore (US$12 billion) (2025)
- Owner: Government of India (79.60%)
- Number of employees: 14591 (2025)
- Website: bankofmaharashtra.bank.in

Bank of Maharashtra (abbreviated as BoM) is an Indian public sector bank, based in Pune. It was established in 1935 and nationalised by the Government of India in 1969. It has 2,641 branches, as of June 2025.

== History ==
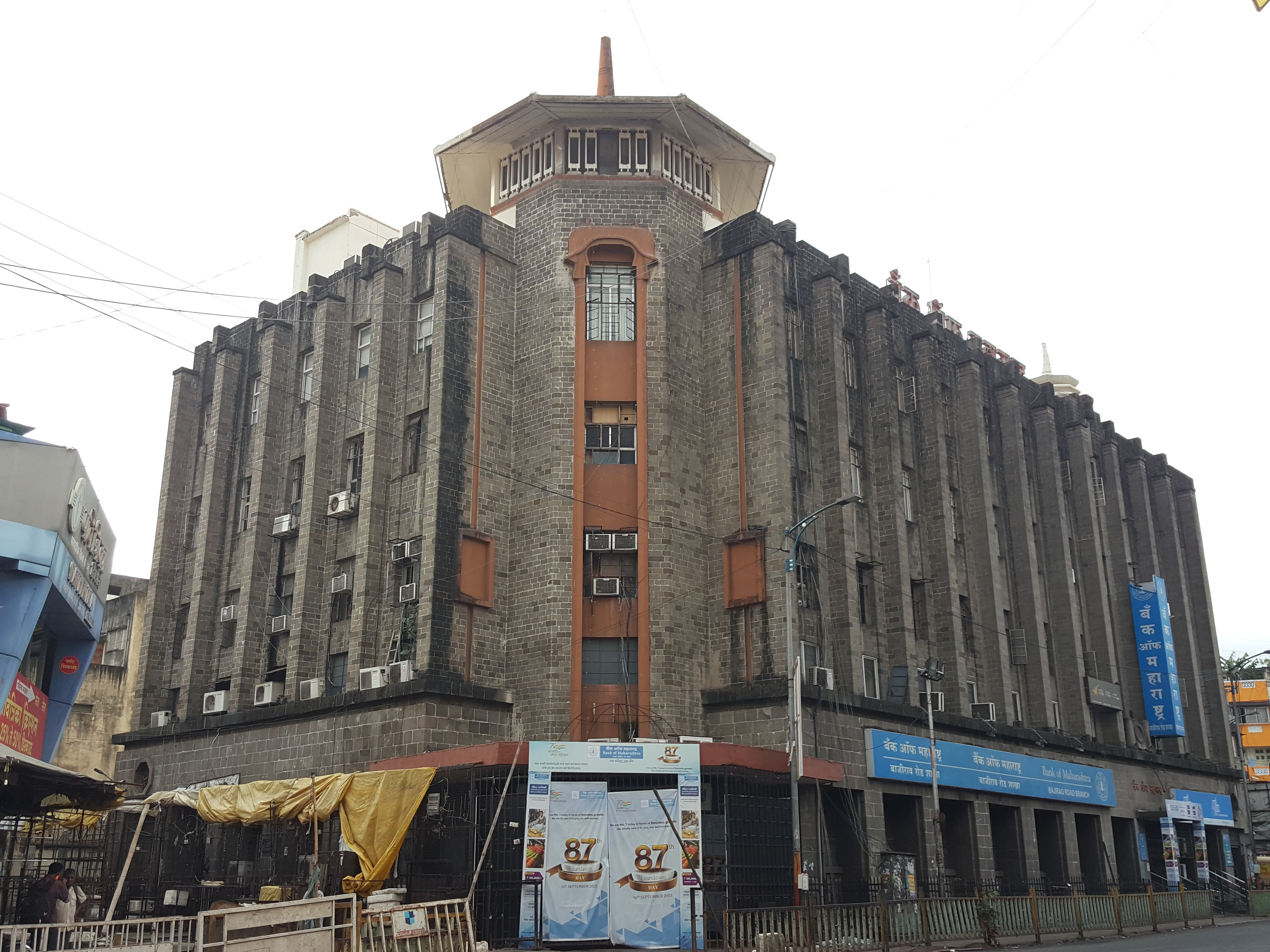
Bank of Maharashtra branch on Bajirao Road, a heritage structure in Pune

Bank of Maharashtra was established on 16 September 1935 in Poona, Bombay Presidency (present day Pune, Maharashtra), under the direction of Mahratta Chamber of Commerce to assist small businesses and traders during the cooperative movement in India.

BoM became a scheduled bank in 1944, obtained a banking license in 1955 under the Banking Companies Act, and listed on the Bombay Stock Exchange in 1958.

In 1961, it acquired three smaller banks in Maharashtra, namely, Bank of Konkan in Malvan, Bank of Nagpur in Nagpur, and Bharat Industrial Bank in Poona.

In July 1969, Bank of Maharashtra was among the 14 major financial institution nationalised by the Government of India.

In 1976, the bank established its first Regional Rural Bank (RRB), "Marathwada Gramin Bank", headquartered at Nanded.

In 1985, the bank opened its 500th Maharashtra branch at Nariman point, Mumbai, equipped with its first ALPM. Its Golden Jubilee year was inaugurated by RBI Governor Dr.Manmohan Singh.

In 2004, Bank of Maharashtra launched an initial public offering (IPO), which reduced the Government of India's ownership stake from 100% to 76.77%

In 2006, Bank of Maharashtra achieved a total business volume if ₹50,000 crore and launched its Core Banking Solution (CBS) implementation.

In 2023, Bank of Maharashtra introduced "ARJUN" (Automated Remote Junction for Monitoring of Assets under Stress), A mobile application featuring an integrated dashboard for managing stressed assets.

== Regional Rural Bank ==
BoM started three regional rural banks (RRBs) in association with central and state governments: Marathwada Gramin Bank in Nanded (1976), Aurangabad-Jalna Gramin Bank in Aurangabad (1981), and Thane Gramin Bank in Thane (1986). These RRBs were merged to create the Maharashtra Gramin Bank in 2009.

The Maharashtra Gramin Bank was further amalgamated on May 1, 2025 with Vidarbha Konkan Gramin Bank under The "One State, One RRB" policy of Government of India to form single RRB per state.

== See also ==
- Banking in India
- List of banks in India
- Reserve Bank of India
- Indian Financial System Code
