= Madhya Pradesh Gramin Bank =

Regional Rural Bank in Madhya Pradesh, India

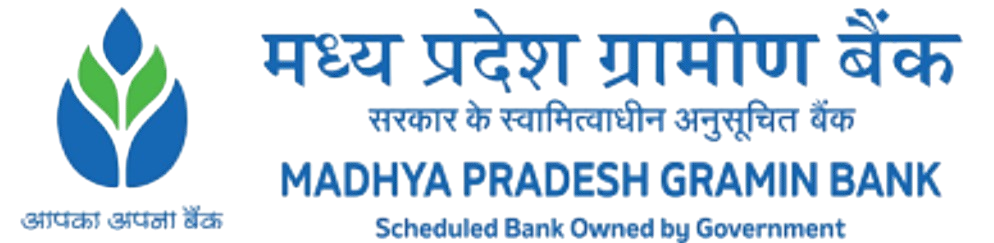
- Native name: मध्य प्रदेश ग्रामीण बैंक
- Type: Regional Rural Bank
- Industry: Financial; Regional Rural Banks
- Predecessor: Madhya Pradesh Gramin Bank; Madhyanchal Gramin Bank
- Founded: 1 May 2025; 16 months ago
- Headquarters: Indore, Madhya Pradesh, India
- Number of locations: 1320 Branches
- Area served: Madhya Pradesh
- Key people: Shri Ramesh Chandra Behera (Chairman)
- Services: Financial services; Banking
- Owner: Government of India (50%) Government of Madhya Pradesh (15%) Bank of India (35%)
- Parent: Ministry of Finance, Government of India
- Website: mpgb.bank.in

The Madhya Pradesh Gramin Bank (MPGB) is an Indian Regional Rural Bank (RRB) in Madhya Pradesh established on 1 May 2025. The bank was formed by the amalgamation of two rural banks in the state of Madhya Pradesh in central India namely Madhya Pradesh Gramin Bank and Madhyanchal Grameen Bank, sponsored by Bank of India, State Bank of India under The "One State, One RRB" policy of government. It currently has 1320 branches in rural areas of Madhya Pradesh. It functions under Regional Rural Banks' Act 1976 and is sponsored by Bank of India.

== See also ==
- List of banks in India
- Regional rural bank
- Banking in India
- Reserve Bank of India
- Indian Financial System Code
- Make in India
