= DCB Bank =

Bank in India

DCB Bank Limited
- Type: Public
- Traded as: BSE: 532772; NSE: DCBBANK
- Industry: Banking; Financial services
- Founded: 1930s
- Headquarters: Mumbai, Maharashtra, India
- Key people: Praveen Achuthan Kutty (MD & CEO)
- Products: Consumer banking; Agriculture & Inclusive Banking; Corporate banking; Finance and Insurance distribution; Mortgage loans; Private banking; Wealth management; Investment banking
- Revenue: ▲₹4,480.39 crore (FY 26-27)
- Operating income: ▲₹1,828.28 crore (FY 26-27)
- Total assets: ▲₹92,647.58 crore (FY 26-27)
- Total equity: 6534.99 crore
- Number of employees: 11,000+ (FY 26-27)
- Website: www.dcb.bank.in

DCB Bank Limited is a private sector scheduled commercial bank headquartered in Lower Parel, Mumbai, whose origin date back to 1930s in India. It is amongst the new generation banks that received the scheduled commercial bank license from the bank regulator, Reserve Bank of India. DCB Bank received the licence on 31 May 1995.

A professional management team guided by the Board of Directors runs the Bank. DCB Bank’s business segments include Retail, micro-SME, SME, mid-Corporate, Agriculture, Commodities, Government, Public Sector, Indian Banks, Co-operative Banks and Non Banking Finance Companies (NBFC). It has approximately 2.5 million customers.

The Aga Khan Fund for Economic Development (AKFED) is the promoter of the Bank with around 15% stake. Public shareholding under the Resident Individual category is approximately 34.44%.

== History ==
DCB Bank Limited has 483 branches across India, as on 30th September 2026, and has operations within the India geography.

It is publicly listed in India on the Bombay Stock Exchange and National Stock Exchange respectively. DCB Bank offered shares to the public by an initial public offering (IPO) in 2006.

Historically, DCB Bank's origin from Maharashtra, India was the outcome of the merger between Ismailia Co-operative Bank Limited and the Masalawala Co-operative Bank to form Development Co-operative Bank. This changed to Development Credit Bank upon grant of the scheduled bank license by the Reserve Bank of India in May 1995.

In 2013, early 2014 the Reserve Bank of India approved the name change to DCB Bank Ltd.. DCB Bank is the contemporary identity, registered entity, and corporate logo.

In September 2021, the Securities and Exchange Board of India (SEBI) disposed of proceeding concerning trading in DCB Bank's stock prior to its October 2015 branch expansion announcement, following a settlement application.

As of 2026, the promoter group, comprising the Aga Khan Fund for Economic Development (AKFED) and Platinum Jubilee Investments ltd, holds a 16.24% equity stake in the bank.

On March 9, 2026, DCB Bank approved the appointment of Pushan Mahapatra as an Additional and Non-Executive (Independent) Director for a three-year term effective March10, 2026.

== Awards ==
DCB Bank was the runner-up Best Small Bank in India recognised by Businessworld Magna Awards 2018. It was also rated as the Best Small Bank in India by BusinessWorld Magna Awards 2017. The Bank was conferred the Good Corporate Citizen Award 2017–18 by the Bombay Chamber of Commerce & Industry. This was in recognition of the activities actively promoted by the Bank for sustainability and climate change mitigation across India. DCB Bank has been awarded the "Excellent Services of the Year" award by ASSOCHAM, in the 8th MSMEs Excellence Awards March 2022. It has also won the Best CSR Impact Award in UBS FORUMS 2022 for its work in Banki, Cuttack, Orissa for its Livelihood Improvement Project through Integrated Watershed Management. It has achieved the prestigious Great Place to Work Certification for 2022-2023 which identifies and recognizes Great Workplace Cultures.

== Financials ==
In October 2026, DCB Bank reported its Q2 FY27 financial results, delivering a net profit of ₹236.39 crore, backed by 21.1% growth in advances and a 18.6%rise in total deposits.

== See also ==
- Banking in India
- List of banks in India
