= Inter-State Council =

Type of non-permanent constitutional body in India

- अन्तर्राज्य परिषद
- Inter State Council in December, 2014
- Formation: May 28, 1990; 36 years ago
- Headquarters: New Delhi
- Chairman: Prime Minister Narendra Modi
- Website: Official website

The Constitution of India, under Article 263, provides that an Inter-State Council (ISC) may be established "at any time it appears to the President that the public interests would be served" by such establishment.

The first Inter-State Option was constituted in 1990 by a presidential order on recommendation of Sarkaria Commission. Moreover, the Commission on Centre-State Relations under the Chairmanship of Justice R. S. Sarkaria had recommended that a permanent Inter-State Council called the Inter-Governmental Council (IGC) should be set up under Article 263. The ISC has been established pursuant to this recommendation of the commission. The Inter-State Council is 'not a permanent body' as it can be established ‘at any time’ if it appears to the President that the public interests would be served by the establishment of such a Council. The Inter-State Council is also 'not a constitutional body' as its source of power is not directly derived from the Constitution. It is for the "President by an order to establish such a Council, and to define the nature of the duties to be performed by it and its organisation" and procedure under Article 263. The objective of the ISC is to discuss or investigate policies, subjects of common interest, and disputes among states.

== Duties ==
According to the Para 4 "Duties of the Council" of President Order dated 28 May 1990, the Council shall be a recommendary body and in that capacity, shall perform the following duties, namely-

1. investigating and discussing subjects in which some or all of the States, or the Union and one or more of the States, have a common interest
2. making recommendations upon any such subject and, in particular, recommendations for the better co ordination of policy and action with respect to that subject
3. deliberating upon such other matters of general interest to the states as may be referred to it by the Chairman

== Composition ==
The Inter-State Council composes of the following members:

- Prime Minister as the Chairman.
- Chief Ministers of all states.
- Chief Ministers of the union territories having legislative assemblies.
- Lieutenant Governors and Administrators of the union territories not having legislative assemblies.
- 6 Union Cabinet Ministers to be nominated by the Prime Minister.
- Governors of the states being administered under President's rule.

=== Standing Committee ===
- Union Home Minister, Chairman
- 5 Union Cabinet Ministers
- 9 Chief Ministers

=== Inter-State Council Secretariat ===
Para 6 of the Presidential Order by which the Inter-State Council was established provided that "there shall be a Secretariat comprising of such officers and staff as the Chairman may think fit to appoint". It was set up in 1991.

- It is headed by officer in the rank of Secretary to the Govt. of India and assisted by:
- two advisors in the rank of Additional Secretary to the Govt. of India;
- two directors and three officers in the rank of Deputy and Under Secretary.

The secretarial functions of the Zonal Councils have been transferred to the Inter-State Council Secretariat with effect from 1 April 2011.

== Meetings ==
The Council has met 12 times since its inception (1990).

Sr. No.	Date	Prime Minister
1	10 October 1990	V. P. Singh
2	15 October 1996	H. D. Deve Gowda
3	17 July 1997	Inder Kumar Gujral
4	28 November 1997	Inder Kumar Gujral
5	22 January 1999	Atal Bihari Vajpayee
6	20 May 2000	Atal Bihari Vajpayee
7	16 November 2001	Atal Bihari Vajpayee
8	27–28 March 2003	Atal Bihari Vajpayee
9	28 June 2005	Manmohan Singh
10	12 December 2006	Manmohan Singh
11	16 July 2016	Narendra Modi
12	25 November 2017	Narendra Modi

== See also ==
- Constitution of India
- Federalism in India
- Union List
- State List
- Concurrent List
- Council of Common Interests
- Inter-State Commission
