= Bank of India =

Indian public sector bank

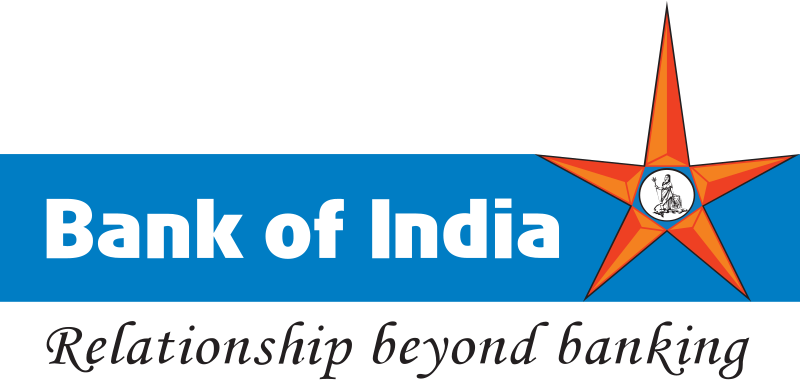

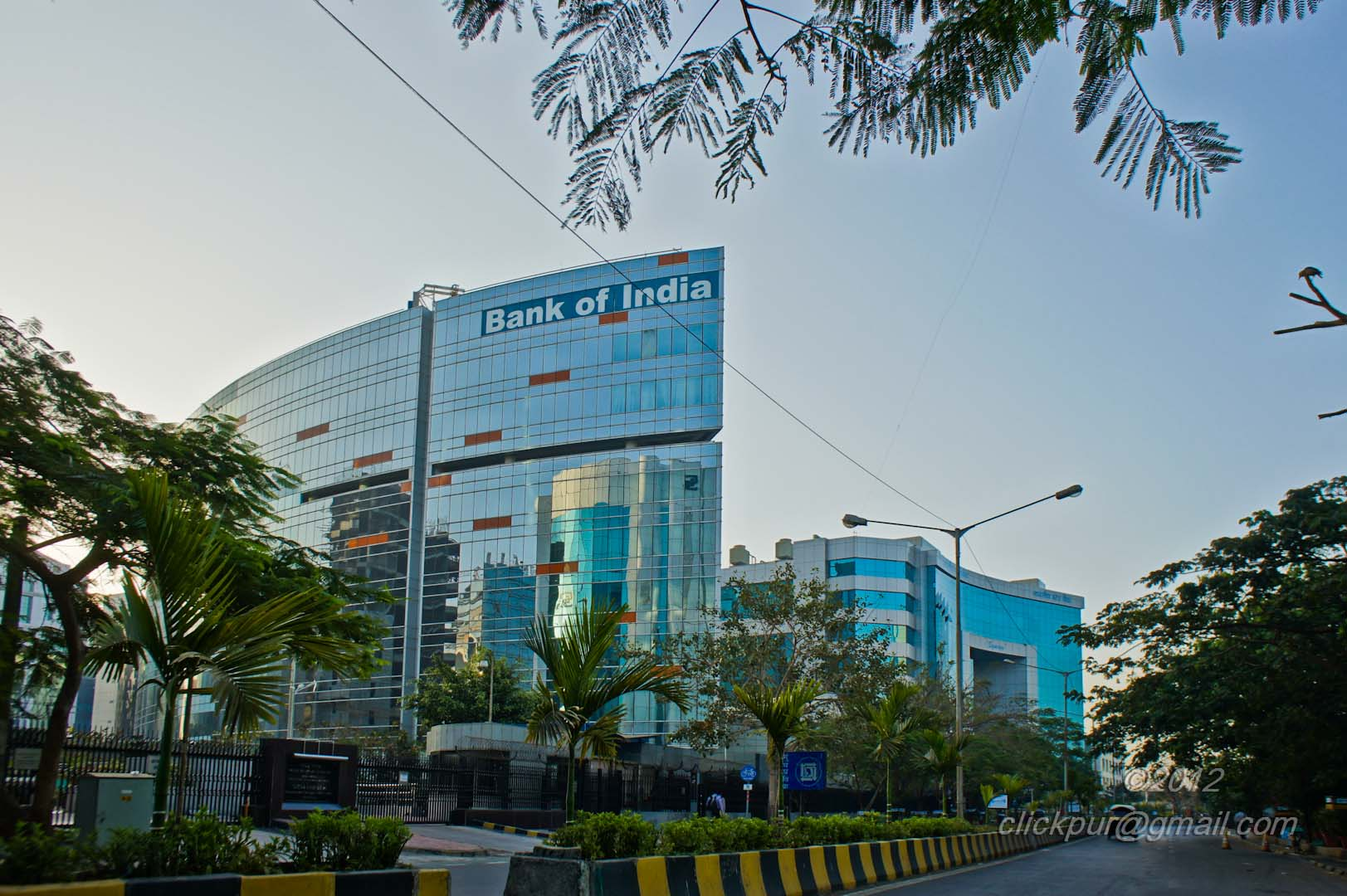
- Bank of India HQ in BKC
- Type: Public
- Traded as: BSE: 532149; NSE: BANKINDIA
- ISIN: INE9832124766
- Industry: Banking; Financial services
- Founded: 7 September 1906; 120 years ago
- Founder: Sassoon David
- Headquarters: Mumbai, Maharashtra, India
- Number of locations: 5,202 Branches; 8,166 ATMs; (December 2024)
- Key people: Rajneesh Karnatak (MD & CEO)
- Products: Retail banking; Corporate banking; Investment banking; Mortgage loans; Private banking; Wealth management; Asset management; Investment management; Credit cards; Insurance
- Revenue: ▲₹85,650 crore (US$9.1 billion) (2026)
- Operating income: ▲₹17,260 crore (US$1.8 billion) (2026)
- Net income: ▲₹10,306 crore (US$1.1 billion) (2026)
- Total assets: ▲₹1,163,433 crore (US$120 billion) (2026)
- Total equity: ▲₹75,278 crore (US$8.0 billion) (2026)
- Owner: Government of India
- Number of employees: 51,010 (2026)
- Subsidiaries: BOI Merchant Bankers Ltd BOI Shareholding Ltd Bank of India Investment Managers Pvt Ltd Bank of India Trustee Service Pvt Ltd RRBs: Madhya Pradesh Gramin Bank
- Website: bankofindia.bank.in

Bank of India (BoI) is an Indian public sector bank headquartered in Bandra Kurla Complex, Mumbai. Founded in 1906, it has been government-owned since nationalisation in 1969. BoI is a founding member of SWIFT (Society for Worldwide Inter Bank Financial Telecommunications), which facilitates provision of cost-effective financial processing and communication services.

As of 31 December 2024, Bank of India's total business stands at ₹14.46 lakh crore (US$150 billion), has 5,202 branches and 8166 ATMs & CRM around the world (including 22 overseas branches).

== History ==
Bank of India was cofounded on 7 September 1906 by Ramnarain Ruia (also known as Ramnarain Hurnundrai), Sassoon Jacob Hai David, Ratanjee Dadabhoy Tata, Gordhandas Khattau, Sir Cowasjee Jehangir, Lalubhai Samaldas, Khetsey Khiasey, Jenarrayen Hindoomull Dani, Noordin Ebrahim Noordin, and Shapurji Broacha from Mumbai, India. The Bank was under private ownership and control till 19 July 1969 when it was nationalised along with 13 other banks.

Beginning with one office in Mumbai, with a paid-up capital of ₹50 lakh (US$53,000) and 50 employees, the Bank has made a rapid growth over the years.

The bank has over 5,084 branches in India spread over all states and Union territories including specialised branches. These branches are controlled through 54 zonal offices. There are 60 branches, 5 subsidiaries, and 1 joint venture abroad.

The bank came out with its maiden public issue in 1997 and follow on Qualified Institutions Placement in February 2008.

== Presence ==
As of 2026 Bank has overseas presence in 15 foreign countries spread over 5 continents with 47 branches/offices including 4 Subsidiaries, 1 Representative office and 1 joint Venture, at key Tokyo,Hong Kong, Singapore, London, Paris, New York, DIFC Dubai and International Banking Unit (IBU) at GIFT City Gandhinagar.

== CMDs since nationalization ==
- 1969–1970 : Tribhovandas Damodardas Kansara
- 1970–1975 : J.N.Saxena
- 1975–1977 : C.P.Shah
- 1977–1980 : H C Sarkar
- 1981–1984 : N Vaghul
- 1984–1986 : T. Tiwari
- 1987–1991 : R. Srinivasan
- 1992–1995 : G. S. Dahotre
- 1995–1997 : G. Kathuria
- 1997–1998 : M.G.Bhide
- 1998–2000 : S Rajagopal
- 2000–2003 : K.V.Krishnamurthy
- 2003–2005 : M.Venugopalan
- 2005–2007 : M Balachandran
- 2007–2009 : T. S. Narayanswami
- 2009–2012 : Alok Kumar Misra
- 2012–2015 : Ms. V.R.Iyer
- 2015–2015 : B.P. Sharma [Executive Director with Additional charge as MD & CEO]
- 2015–2017 : Melwyn Rego [MD & CEO]
- 2017–2019 : Dinabandhu Mohapatra [MD & CEO]
- 2019–2023: Atanu Kumar Das
- 2023–Present: Rajneesh Karnatak

== See also ==
- Banking in India
- List of banks in India
- Reserve Bank of India
- Indian Financial System Code
- List of largest banks
- List of companies of India
