= Ministry of Finance (India) =

Federal ministry in India

- Branch of Government of India

- Ministry of Finance

Agency overview
- Formed: 29 October 1946; 80 years ago
- Jurisdiction: Government of India
- Headquarters: Kartavya Bhavan-01 Janpath, New Delhi
- Minister responsible: Nirmala Sitharaman, Cabinet Minister
- Agency executives: Vacant,IAS, Finance Secretary; Vumlunmang Vualnam, IAS, Expenditure Secretary; Arunish Chawla, IAS, Secretary (Investment and Public Asset Management); Sanjay Lohiya, IAS, Secretary (Financial Services); Anuradha Thakur, IAS, Economic Affairs Secretary; K Moses Chalai, IAS, Secretary (Department of Public Enterprises); Arvind Shrivastava, Secretary (Revenue Secretary); V. Anantha Nageswaran, Chief Economic Adviser
- Child agencies: Department of Economic Affairs Official website; Department of Expenditure Official website; Department of Revenue Official website; Department of Financial Services Official website; Department of Investment and Public Asset Management Official website; Department of Public Enterprise Official website
- Key documents: https://www.indiabudget.gov.in/; https://www.indiabudget.gov.in/economicsurvey/
- Website: https://services.india.gov.in/service/ministry_services?ln=en&cmd_id=1126

The Ministry of Finance (IAST: Vitta Mantrālaya) is a ministry of the Government of India that manages the government's finances and acts as its treasury. It oversees taxation, financial legislation, financial institutions, capital markets, currency, banking services, and centre and state finances. It also prepares the annual Union Budget and Economic Survey and works through six departments: Economic Affairs, Expenditure, Revenue, Financial Services, Investment and Public Asset Management, and Public Enterprises.

The ministry is the cadre-controlling authority for three central civil services: the Indian Revenue Service, the Indian Economic Service, and the Indian Cost Accounts Service.

== History ==
Under British rule, the Finance Member of the Viceroy's Executive Council managed the government's finances. The first, James Wilson, presented India's first budget and introduced income tax in 1860. The ministry was established in 1946 as part of the interim government with John Matthai as the minister. However, Matthai was soon replaced by Liaquat Ali Khan when the All-India Muslim League joined the interim government. Sir R.K. Shanmukham Chetty KCIE (17 October 1892 – 5 May 1953) was independent India's first Finance Minister and presented its first budget on 26 November 1947.

During the planning era, the ministry administered extensive controls on foreign exchange and imports. In 1991, facing a balance-of-payments crisis, finance minister Manmohan Singh led reforms that cut tariffs, abolished most industrial licensing, and opened the economy to foreign investments.

== Department of Economic Affairs ==
The Department of Economic Affairs is the nodal agency of the Union Government to formulate and monitor country's economic policies and programmes having a bearing on domestic and international aspects of economic management. A principal responsibility of this department is the preparation and presentation of the Union Budget to the parliament and budget for the state Governments under President's rule and union territory administrations. Other main functions include:

- Formulation and monitoring of macroeconomic policies, including issues relating to fiscal policy and public finance, inflation, public debt management and the functioning of capital market including stock exchanges. In this context, it looks at ways and means to raise internal resources through taxation, market borrowings and mobilisation of small savings;
- Monitoring and raising of external resources through multilateral and bilateral Official Development Assistance, sovereign borrowings abroad, foreign investments and monitoring foreign exchange resources including balance of payments;
- Production of bank notes and coins of various denominations, postal stationery, postal stamps; and Cadre management, career planning and training of the Indian Economic Service (IES).

The Foreign Investment Promotion Board (FIPB), housed in the Department of Economic Affairs, Ministry of Finance, was an inter-ministerial body, responsible for processing of FDI proposals and making recommendations for Government approval. FIPB was abolished by then-Finance Minister Arun Jaitley during the 2017-2018 budget speech in the Lok Sabha.

Anuradha Thakur is the current secretary of this department.

== Department of Expenditure ==
The Department of Expenditure is the nodal department for overseeing the public financial management system"Official Website". in the Central Government and matters connected with the state finances. The principal activities of the department include a pre-sanction appraisal of major schemes/projects (both Plan and non-Plan expenditure), handling the bulk of the Central budgetary resources transferred to States, implementation of the recommendations of the Finance and Central Pay Commissions, overseeing the expenditure management in the Central Ministries/Departments through the interface with the Financial Advisors and the administration of the Financial Rules / Regulations /Orders through monitoring of Audit comments/observations, preparation of Central Government Accounts, managing the financial aspects of personnel management in the Central Government, assisting Central Ministries/Departments in controlling the costs and prices of public services, assisting organizational re-engineering thorough review of staffing patterns and O&M studies and reviewing systems and procedures to optimize outputs and outcomes of public expenditure. The department is also coordinating matters concerning the Ministry of Finance including Parliament-related work of the ministry. The department has under its administrative control the National Institute of Financial Management (NIFM), Faridabad.

The business allocated to the Department of Expenditure is carried out through its Establishment Division, Plan Finance I and II Divisions, Finance Commission Division, Staff Inspection Unit, Cost Accounts Branch, Controller General of Accounts, and the Central Pension Accounting.

Vumlunmang Vualnam is the current secretary of this department.

== Department of Revenue ==
The Department of Revenue function under the overall direction and control of the Secretary (Revenue). It exercises control in respect of matters relating to all the Direct and Indirect Union Taxes through two statutory Boards namely, the Central Board of Direct Taxes (CBDT) and the Central Board of Indirect Taxes and Customs (CBIC). Each Board is headed by a chairman who is also ex officio Special Secretary to the Government of India (Secretary level). Matters relating to the levy and collection of all Direct taxes are looked after by the CBDT whereas those relating to levy and collection of GST, Customs Duty, Central Excise duties and other Indirect taxes fall within the purview of the CBIC. The two Boards were constituted under the Central Board of Revenue Act, 1963. At present, the CBDT has six Members and the CBIC also has six Members. The Members are also ex officio Secretaries to the Government of India. Members of CBDT are as follows:

1. Member (Income Tax)
2. Member (Legislation and Computerisation)
3. Member (Revenue)
4. Member (Personnel & Vigilance)
5. Member (Investigation)
6. Member (Audit & Judicial)

The Central Board of Indirect Taxes & Customs (CBIC) is headed by a chairperson and consists of six members:

1. Member (Customs)
2. Member (Tax Policy & Legal)
3. Member (GST, Central Excise & Service Tax)
4. Member (Administration & Vigilance)
5. Member (IT & Taxpayer Services)
6. Member (Compliance Management)

Arvind Shrivastava is the current secretary of this department.

== Department of Financial Services ==
The Department of Financial Services covers banking, insurance, and financial Services provided by various government agencies and private corporations. It also covers pension reforms and industrial finance and micro, small and medium enterprises. It started the Pradhan Mantri Jan Dhan Yojana. Sanjay Lohiya is the current secretary of this department.

This department has ownership over the following central government establishments:

=== Recruitment Bodies ===
- Institute of Banking Personnel Selection (IBPS)

=== National Apex Bodies ===
- Indian Institute of Banking and Finance (IIBF)
- Insurance Institute of India
- Institute of Actuaries of India

=== All India Financial Institutions ===
1. National Bank for Agriculture and Rural Development (NABARD)
2. National Housing Bank (NHB)
3. Small Industries Development Bank of India (SIDBI)
4. Export Import Bank (EXIM Bank)
5. National Bank for Financing Infrastructure and Development (NaBFID)

=== Development Finance Institution ===
- Industrial Development Bank of India (IDBI)
- Industrial Finance Corporation of India (IFCI)
- Unit Trust of India (UTI)
- India Infrastructure Finance Company Limited (IIFCL)
- IIFCL Projects Limited, a wholly owned subsidiary of IIFCL
- Agricultural Finance Corporation of India (AFCI)
- National Bank Financing Infrastructure and Development

=== Joint ventures ===
- Hardicon Limited, a joint venture of Public Sector Banks and Financial Institutions
- NITCON Limited

=== Central Public Sector Undertakings ===
==== 1. Nationalised Banks ====
Presently there are 12 nationalised banks in India.

1. State Bank of India
2. Bank of Baroda
3. Union Bank of India
4. Punjab National Bank
5. Canara Bank
6. Punjab & Sind Bank
7. Indian Bank
8. Bank of Maharashtra
9. Bank of India
10. Central Bank of India
11. Indian Overseas Bank
12. UCO Bank

==== 2. Regional Rural Banks ====
Presently, there are 28 regional rural banks in India.

Andhra Pradesh

- Andhra Pradesh Grameena Bank

Arunachal Pradesh

- Arunachal Pradesh Rural Bank

Assam

- Assam Gramin Bank

Bihar

- Bihar Gramin Bank

Chhattisgarh

- Chhattisgarh Gramin Bank

Gujarat

- Gujarat Gramin Bank

Haryana

- Haryana Gramin Bank

Himachal Pradesh

- Himachal Pradesh Gramin Bank

Jammu and Kashmir

- Jammu and Kashmir Grameen Bank

Jharkhand

- Jharkhand Gramin Bank

Karnataka

- Karnataka Grameena Bank

Kerala

- Kerala Grameena Bank

Madhya Pradesh

- Madhya Pradesh Gramin Bank

Maharashtra

- Maharashtra Gramin Bank

Manipur

- Manipur Rural Bank

Meghalaya

- Meghalaya Rural Bank

Mizoram

- Mizoram Rural Bank

Nagaland

- Nagaland Rural Bank

Odisha

- Odisha Grameen Bank

Puducherry

- Puducherry Grama Bank

Punjab

- Punjab Gramin Bank

Rajasthan

- Rajasthan Gramin Bank

Tamil Nadu

- Tamil Nadu Grama Bank

Telangana

- Telangana Grameena Bank

Tripura

- Tripura Gramin Bank

Uttar Pradesh

- Uttar Pradesh Gramin Bank

Uttarakhand

- Uttarakhand Gramin Bank

West Bengal

- West Bengal Gramin Bank

==== 3. Nationalised Insurance Companies ====
- Life Insurance Corporation
- General Insurance Corporation of India
- New India Assurance
- National Insurance Company Limited
- Oriental Insurance Company Limited
- United India Insurance Company
- Agriculture Insurance Company of India

==== 4. Other Companies/Bodies ====
- National Credit Guarantee Trustee Company Limited
- Security Printing and Minting Corporation of India Limited
- National Institute of Securities Markets
- UTI Infrastructure Technology and Services Limited

== Department of Investment and Public Asset Management ==
The Department of Disinvestment has been renamed as Department of Investment and Public Asset Management or 'DIPAM', a decision aimed at the proper management of Centre's investments in equity including its disinvestment in central public sector undertakings. Finance Minister Arun Jaitley had announced the renaming of the Department of Disinvestment in his budget speech for 2016–17. Initially set up as an independent ministry (The Ministry of Disinvestment) in December 1999, the Department of Disinvestments came into existence in May 2004 when the ministry was turned into a department of the Ministry of Finance. The department took up all the functions of the erstwhile ministry which broadly was responsible for a systematic policy approach to disinvestment and privatisation of Public Sector Units (PSUs).

Arunish Chawla (IAS) is the current secretary of this department.

== Department of Public Enterprises ==
The Department of Public Enterprises (DPE) which was earlier part of the Ministry of Heavy Industries and Public Enterprises was shifted to Ministry of Finance. Resulting in Finance Ministry having six departments while the Ministry of Heavy Industries and Public Enterprises was renamed to the Ministry of Heavy Industries. This shift was carried out to help in efficient monitoring of the capital expenditure, asset monetisation and financial health of the Central Public Sector Undertakings (CPSUs).

K Moses Chalai, IAS is currently serving as the Secretary of Department of Public Enterprises.

== Controversial policies ==
In 2012, finance minister Pranab Mukherjee amended the Income-tax Act, 1961 to retrospectively tax indirect transfers of Indian assets, following a Supreme Court of India ruling on a case involving Vodafone India. The amendment led to tax demands in 17 cases and later to arbitration awards against India in the Vodafone and Cairn cases. In 2021, the government withdrew the demands, acknowledging that "retrospective amendments militate against the principle of tax certainty and damage India's reputation". Critics, including the former United States Assistant Secretary of Commerce Ray Vickery, criticised India for retrospective taxation, noting that "the Vodafone tax case had sent a very negative signal to international markets."

In November 2016, the government withdrew the legal-tender status of ₹500 (equivalent to ₹780 or US$8.40 in 2026), citing counterfeit currency and undeclared cash, and linked the move to push for digital payments. In 2018, the Reserve Bank of India reported that 99.3% of the withdrawn notes, worth ₹15.31 lakh crore (equivalent to ₹22 trillion or US$240 billion in 2026), had been returned to the banks. Critics took this as evidence that little undeclared cash had been eliminated. The government later also stalled a critical report on the exercise from tabling in the Parliament. The Finance Act, 2017, introduced electoral bonds in India, allowing anonymous donations to political parties through the State Bank of India and removed the limit on corporate donations. In February 2024, the Supreme Court of India ruled the scheme unconstitutional. In 2018, the ministry publicly disputed with the RBI over several issues, with governor Urjit Patel resigning in December 2018 citing "personal reasons".

== See also ==
- National Institute of Public Finance and Policy
- Minister of Finance (India)
- Central Plan Scheme Monitoring System
- Department of Financial Services (India)
