= Tamil Nadu Grama Bank =

Bank

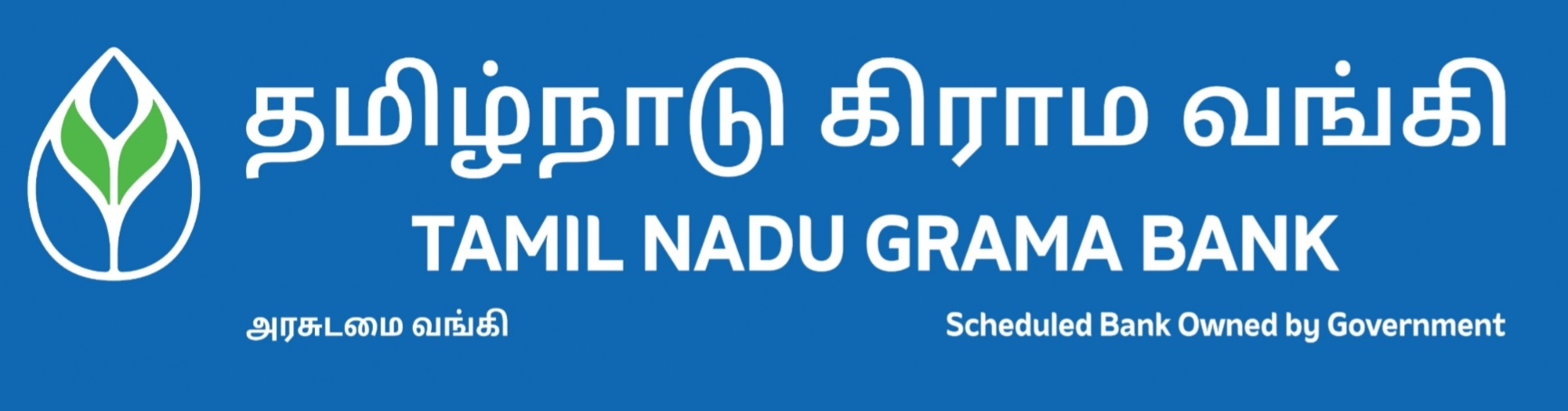
- Native name: தமிழ்நாடு கிராம வங்கி
- Type: Regional Rural Bank
- Industry: Banking; Financial services
- Predecessor: Pallavan Grama Bank; Pandyan Grama Bank
- Founded: 1 April 2019; 7 years ago
- Headquarters: 6, Yercaud Salai, Hasthampatti, Salem, Tamil Nadu, India
- Number of locations: 682 (2025)
- Area served: Tamil Nadu, India
- Key people: Mani Subramanian (Chairman)
- Products: Consumer banking; Finance and insurance; Mortgage loans; Private banking; Term Deposits
- Revenue: ▲₹3,099.57 crore (US$320 million) (2024)
- Operating income: ▲₹775.71 crore (US$81 million) (2024)
- Net income: ▲₹446.73 crore (US$46 million) (2024)
- Total assets: ▲₹32,761.26 crore (US$3.4 billion) (2024)
- Owner: Government of India (50%); Indian Bank (35%); Government of Tamil Nadu (15%)
- Number of employees: 2700+ (2024)
- Parent: Ministry of Finance, Government of India
- Website: tngb.bank.in

Tamil Nadu Grama Bank (TNGB) is a regional rural bank headquartered at Salem in Tamil Nadu, India. The bank is jointly owned by the central and state governments and sponsored by the Indian Bank. It is under the ownership of the Ministry of Finance, Government of India.

As per Gazette Notification No. 363 dated 28 January 2019, the Government of India amalgamated Pandyan Grama Bank (sponsored by Indian Overseas Bank) and Pallavan Grama Bank (sponsored by Indian Bank) into a new single Regional Rural Bank named Tamil Nadu Grama Bank. The bank was formed on 1st April 2019.

== Share holders ==
The paid-up capital is ₹46.96 crore, shared by the shareholders as below:

- Government of India (50%): ₹23.48 crore
- Government of Tamil Nadu (15%): ₹7.04 crore
- Indian Bank (35%): ₹16.44 crore
