= Wholesale banking =

Offering of services by financial institutions to large institutional customers

Wholesale banking, also called corporate banking, is the provision of services by banks to larger customers or organizations such as mortgage brokers, large corporate clients, mid-sized companies, real estate developers and investors, international trade finance businesses, institutional customers (such as pension funds and government entities/agencies), and services offered to other banks or other financial institutions.

Wholesale or corporate finance refers to financial services conducted between financial services companies and institutions such as banks, insurers, fund managers, and stockbrokers.

Modern wholesale banks engage in:

- Finance wholesaling
- Underwriting
- Market making
- Consultancy
- Mergers and acquisitions
- Fund management
- Syndicated loans

== International application ==
=== United States ===
Under the Community Reinvestment Act (12 CFR 25.25), a banking institution can apply to be a wholesale or limited-purpose bank. When selected as a wholesale bank, banking institutions are excluded from providing services such as home mortgages, small business, and consumer loans.

== See also ==
- Merchant banking
- Retail banking
- Commercial banking
- Investment banking
- Shadow bank
