= Indian Financial System Code =

Unique identifier for a branch of a financial institution in India

The Indian Financial System Code (IFS Code or IFSC) is an alphanumeric code that facilitates electronic funds transfer in India. A code uniquely identifies each bank branch participating in the three main Payment and settlement systems in India: the National Electronic Funds Transfer (NEFT), Real Time Gross Settlement (RTGS) and Immediate Payment Service (IMPS) systems.

== Format ==
The IFSC is an 11-character code with the first four alphabetic characters representing the bank name, and the last six characters (usually numeric, but can be alphabetic) representing the branch. The fifth character is 0 (zero) and reserved for future use. Bank IFS Code is used by the NEFT & RTGS systems to route the messages to the destination banks/branches. The format of the IFS Code is shown below.

1	2	3	4	5	6	7	8	9	10	11
Bank Code				0	Branch Code					

== Lists of IFS Codes ==
Bank-wise lists of IFS Codes are available with all the bank-branches participating in inter bank electronic funds transfer. A list of bank-branches participating in NEFT/RTGS and their IFS Code is available on the website of the Reserve Bank of India. All the banks have also been advised to print the IFS code of the branch on cheques issued by branches to their customers.

== See also ==
- List of financial supervisory authorities by country
