= Small finance bank =

Types of banking license by rbi

Small finance banks (SFB) are a type of niche banks in India. Banks with a SFB license can provide basic banking service of acceptance of deposits and lending. The aim behind these is to provide financial inclusion to sections of the economy not being served by other banks, such as small business units, small and marginal farmers, micro and small industries and unorganised sector entities.

== Summary of regulations ==
- Existing non-banking financial companies (NBFC), microfinance institutions (MFI) and local area banks (LAB) can apply to become small finance banks.
- They can be promoted either by individuals, corporate, trusts or societies.
- They are established as public limited companies in the private sector under the Companies Act, 2013.
- They are governed by the provisions of Reserve Bank of India Act, 1934, Banking Regulation Act, 1949 and other relevant statutes.
- The banks will not be restricted to any region.
- They were set up with the twin objectives of providing an institutional mechanism for promoting rural and semi urban savings and for providing credit for viable economic activities in the local areas.
- 75% of its net credits should be in priority sector lending and 50% of the loans in its portfolio must in ₹25 lakh (US$26,000) range.
- The firms must have a capital of at least ₹200 crore (US$10 million).
- The promoters should have 10 years' experience in banking and finance. The promoters stake in the paid-up equity capital will be at least 40% initially but must be brought down to 26% in 12 years. Joint ventures are not permitted. Foreign share holding will be allowed in these banks as per the rules for FDI in private banks in India.
- At net worth of ₹500 crore (US$52 million), listing will be mandatory within three years. Small finance banks having net worth of below ₹500 crore (US$52 million) could also get their shares listed voluntarily.

== Guidelines ==
=== Registration, licensing and regulations ===
The small finance bank shall be registered as a public limited company under the Companies Act, 2013. It will be licensed under Section 22 of the Banking Regulation Act, 1949 and governed by the provisions of the Banking Regulation Act, 1949; Reserve Bank of India Act, 1934; Foreign Exchange Management Act, 1999; Payment and Settlement Systems Act, 2007; Credit Information Companies (Regulation) Act, 2005; Deposit Insurance and Credit Guarantee Corporation Act, 1961; other relevant Statutes and the Directives, Prudential Regulations and other Guidelines/Instructions issued by RBI and other regulators from time to time. The small finance banks will be given scheduled bank status once they commence their operations, and found suitable as per Section 42 (6) (a) of the Reserve Bank of India Act, 1934.

=== Objectives ===
The objectives of setting up of small finance banks will be for furthering financial inclusion by (i) provision of savings vehicles primarily to unserved and underserved sections of the population, and (ii) supply of credit to small business units; small and marginal farmers; micro and small industries; and other unorganised sector entities, through high technology-low cost operations.

=== Eligible promoters ===
Resident individuals/professionals with 10 years of experience in banking and finance; and Companies and Societies owned and controlled by residents will be eligible as promoters to set up small finance banks. Existing Non-Banking Finance Companies (NBFCs), Micro Finance Institutions (MFIs), and Local Area Banks (LABs) that are owned and controlled by residents can also opt for conversion into small finance banks after complying with all legal and regulatory requirements of various authorities and if they conform to these guidelines. However, joint ventures by different promoter groups for the purpose of setting up small finance banks would not be permitted. As local focus and the ability to serve smaller customers will be the key criteria in licensing such banks, this may be a more appropriate vehicle for local players or players who are focused on lending to unserved / underserved sections of the society. Accordingly, proposals from large public sector entities and industrial and business houses, including from NBFCs promoted by them, will not be entertained.

Promoter / Promoter Groups as defined in the SEBI (Issue of Capital & Disclosure Requirements) Regulations, 2009 should be 'fit and proper' in order to be eligible to promote small finance banks. RBI would assess the 'fit and proper' status of the applicants on the basis of their past record of sound credentials and integrity; financial soundness and successful track record of professional experience or of running their businesses, etc. for at least a period of five years.

=== Scope of activities ===
The small finance bank, in furtherance of the objectives for which it is set up, shall primarily undertake basic banking activities of acceptance of deposits and lending to unserved and underserved sections including small business units, small and marginal farmers, micro and small industries and unorganised sector entities. It can also undertake other non-risk sharing simple financial services activities, not requiring any commitment of own fund, such as distribution of mutual fund units, insurance products, pension products, etc. with the prior approval of the RBI and after complying with the requirements of the sectoral regulator for such products. The small finance bank can also become a Category II Authorised Dealer in foreign exchange business for its clients' requirements. It cannot set up subsidiaries to undertake non-banking financial services activities.

The annual branch expansion plans of the small finance banks for the initial five years would need prior approval of RBI. The annual branch expansion plans should be in compliance with the requirement of opening at least 25 per cent of its branches in unbanked rural centres (population up to 9,999 as per the latest census).

There will not be any restriction in the area of operations of small finance banks; however, preference will be given to those applicants who in the initial phase set up the bank in a cluster of under-banked States / districts, such as in the North-East, East and Central regions of the country. These applicants will not have any hindrance to expand to other regions in due course. It is expected that the small finance bank should primarily be responsive to local needs. After the initial stabilisation period of five years, and after a review, RBI may liberalize the requirement of prior approval for annual branch expansion plans and scope of activities of the small finance banks.

The other financial and non-financial services activities of the promoters, if any, should be kept distinctly ring-fenced and not commingled with the banking business.

The small finance bank will be required to use the words "Small Finance Bank" in its name in order to differentiate it from other banks.

=== Capital requirement ===
The minimum paid-up equity capital for small finance banks shall be ₹300 crore (US$31 million). In view of the inherent risk of a small finance bank, it shall be required to maintain a minimum capital adequacy ratio of 15 per cent of its risk weighted assets (RWA) on a continuous basis, subject to any higher percentage as may be prescribed by RBI from time to time. Tier I capital should be at least 7.5 per cent of RWAs. Tier II capital should be limited to a maximum of 100 per cent of total Tier I capital. As small finance banks are not expected to deal with sophisticated products, the capital adequacy ratio will be computed under Basel Committee's standardised approaches.

=== Promoter's contribution ===
The promoter's minimum initial contribution to the paid-up equity capital of such small finance bank shall at least be 40 per cent. If the initial shareholding by promoter in the bank is in excess of 40 per cent, it should be brought down to 40 per cent within a period of five years. The promoter's minimum contribution of 40 per cent of paid-up equity capital shall be locked in for a period of five years from the date of commencement of business of the bank. Further, the promoter's stake should be brought down to 30 per cent of the paid-up equity capital of the bank within a period of 10 years, and to 26 per cent within 12 years from the date of commencement of business of the bank.

==== Stock exchange listing ====
Proposals having diversified shareholding subject to the initial minimum shareholding of promoters and a time frame for listing of the bank will be preferred. However, after the small finance bank reaches the net worth of ₹500 crore (US$52 million), listing will be mandatory within three years of reaching that net worth. However, small finance banks having net worth of below ₹500 crore (US$52 million) could also get their shares listed voluntarily, subject to fulfillment of the requirements of the capital markets regulator.

=== Foreign shareholding ===
The foreign shareholding in the small finance bank would be as per the Foreign Direct Investment (FDI) policy for private sector banks as amended from time to time. As per the current FDI policy, the aggregate foreign investment in a private sector bank from all sources will be allowed up to a maximum of 74 per cent of the paid-up capital of the bank (automatic up to 49 per cent and approval route beyond 49 per cent to 74 per cent). At all times, at least 26 per cent of the paid-up capital will have to be held by residents. In the case of Foreign Institutional Investors (FIIs) / Foreign Portfolio Investors (FPIs), individual FII / FPI holding is restricted to below 10 per cent of the total paid-up capital, aggregate limit for all FIIs /FPIs / Qualified Foreign Investors (QFIs) cannot exceed 24 per cent of the total paid-up capital, which can be raised to 49 per cent of the total paid-up capital by the bank concerned through a resolution by its board of directors followed by a special resolution to that effect by its General Body. In the case of NRIs, the individual holding is restricted to 5 per cent of the total paid-up capital both on repatriation and non-repatriation basis and aggregate limit cannot exceed 10 per cent of the total paid-up capital both on repatriation and non-repatriation basis. However, Non-Resident Indian (NRI) holding can be allowed up to 24 per cent of the total paid-up capital both on repatriation and non-repatriation basis provided the banking company passes a special resolution to that effect in the General Body.

=== Voting rights and transfer/acquisition of shares ===
As per Section 12 (2) of the Banking Regulation Act, 1949, any shareholder's voting rights in private sector banks are capped at 10 per cent. This limit can be raised to 26 per cent in a phased manner by the RBI. Further, as per Section 12B of the Act ibid, any acquisition of 5 per cent or more of paid-up share capital in a private sector bank will require prior approval of RBI. This will also apply to the small finance banks.

=== Prudential norms ===
The newly set up small finance banks should ensure that they put in place a robust risk management framework. The small finance bank will be subject to all prudential norms and regulations of RBI as applicable to existing commercial banks including requirement of maintenance of CRR and SLR. No forbearance would be provided for complying with the statutory provisions.

In view of the objective for which small finance bank will be set up, it will be required to extend 75 per cent of its Adjusted Net Bank Credit (ANBC) to the sectors eligible for classification as priority sector lending (PSL) by RBI. While 40 per cent of its ANBC should be allocated to different sub-sectors under PSL as per the extant PSL prescriptions, the bank can allocate the balance 35 per cent to any one or more sub-sectors under the PSL where it has competitive advantage.

The maximum loan size and investment limit exposure to a single and group obligor would be restricted to 10 per cent and 15 per cent of its capital funds, respectively. Further, in order to ensure that the bank extends loans primarily to small borrowers, at least 50 per cent of its loan portfolio should constitute loans and advances of up to ₹25 lakh (US$26,000).

After the initial stabilisation period of five years, and after a review, RBI may relax the above exposure limits.

In addition to the restrictions placed on banks' loans and advances to its directors and the companies in which its directors are interested under Section 20 of the Banking Regulation Act, 1949, the small finance bank is precluded from having any exposure to its promoters, major shareholders (who have shareholding of 10 per cent of paid-up equity shares in the bank), the relatives [as defined in Section 2 (77) of the Companies Act, 2013 and Rules made there under] of the promoters as also the entities in which they have significant influence or control (as defined under Accounting Standards AS 21 and AS 23).

=== Additional conditions for NBFCs/MFIs/LABs converting into a bank ===
An existing NBFC/MFI/LAB, if it meets the conditions under these guidelines, could apply to convert itself into a small finance bank, after complying with all legal and approval requirements from various authorities. In such a case, the entity shall have a minimum net worth of ₹100 crore (US$10 million) or it shall infuse additional paid-up equity capital to achieve net worth of ₹100 crore (US$10 million). It may be noted that on conversion into a small finance bank, the NBFC / MFI will cease to exist and all its business which a bank can undertake should fold into the bank and the activities which a bank cannot statutorily undertake be divested / disposed of. Further, the branches of the NBFC / MFI should either be converted into bank branches or be merged / closed as per the business plan. The small finance bank and the NBFC / MFI cannot co-exist.

Banks are precluded from creating floating charge on their assets. For such NBFCs / MFIs, which succeed in obtaining licences to convert into small finance banks, if they have created floating charges on their assets for secured borrowings which stand in their balance sheets on the day of conversion into a bank, RBI will permit grandfathering of such borrowings till their maturity, subject to imposition of additional capital charge in order to protect the interest of the depositors.

If the existing NBFCs / MFIs / LABs have diluted the promoters' shareholding to below 40 per cent, but above 26 per cent, due to regulatory requirements or otherwise, RBI may not insist on the promoters' minimum initial contribution as indicated in paragraph 6 of the guidelines.

=== Business plan ===
The applicants for small finance bank licences will be required to furnish their business plans along with project reports with their applications. The business plan will have to address how the bank proposes to achieve the objectives behind setting up of small finance banks and in the case of an NBFC / MFI applicant, how the existing business of NBFC / MFI will fold into the bank or divested / disposed of. The business plan submitted by the applicant should be realistic and viable. In case of deviation from the stated business plan after issue of licence, RBI may consider and restricting the bank's expansion, effecting change in management and imposing other penal measures as may be necessary.

=== Corporate governance ===
The Board of the small finance bank should have a majority of independent directors. The bank should comply with the corporate governance guidelines including 'fit and proper' criteria for directors as issued by RBI from time to time.

=== Other conditions ===
If a promoter setting up a small finance bank desires to set up a Payments Bank, it should set up both types of banks under a Non-Operative Financial Holding Company (NOFHC) structure. However, a promoter will not be granted licences for both universal bank and small finance bank even if the proposal is to set them up under the NOFHC structure.

Individuals (including relatives) and entities other than the promoters will not be permitted to have shareholding in excess of 10 per cent of the paid-up equity capital of the bank. In case of existing NBFCs / MFIs / LABs converting into small finance bank, where there is shareholding in excess of 10 per cent of the paid-up equity capital by entities other than the promoters, RBI may consider providing time up to 3 years for the shareholding to be brought down to 10 per cent.

The small finance bank cannot be a Business Correspondent (BC) for another bank. However, it can have its own BC network.

The operations of the bank should be technology driven from the beginning, conforming to generally accepted standards and norms; while new approaches (such as for data storage, security and real time data updation) are encouraged, a detailed technology plan for the same should be furnished to RBI.

The bank is required maintain customer grievances cell to handle customer complaints. The small finance banks fall under the purview of RBI's Banking Ombudsman Scheme, 2006.

The compliance of terms and conditions laid down by RBI is an essential condition of grant of licence. Any non-compliance will attract penal measures including cancellation of licence of the bank.

=== Transition path ===
The small finance bank may choose to continue as a differentiated bank. If it aspires to transit into a universal bank, such transition will not be automatic, but would be subject to it applying to RBI for such conversion and fulfilling minimum paid-up capital / net worth requirement as applicable to universal banks; its satisfactory track record of performance as a small finance bank for a minimum period of five years and the outcome of RBI's due diligence exercise. On transition into a universal bank, it will be subjected to all the norms including NOFHC structure as applicable to universal banks.

== History ==
On 17 July 2014, the Reserve Bank of India (RBI) released the draft guidelines for small finance banks, seeking comments for interested entities and the general public. The final guidelines were released by RBI on 27 November 2014.

In February 2015, RBI released the list of entities which had applied for a small finance bank license. There were 72 applicants. It was announced that an external advisory committee headed by Usha Thorat would evaluate the license applications.

On 17 September 2015, The Reserve Bank of India (RBI) announced that it had given provisional licenses to ten entities who would have to convert into small finance banks within one year. Eight out of these ten entities were microfinance NBFCs, reiterating RBIs agenda of financial inclusion. Capital Small Finance Bank was the first small finance bank to begin operations, opening with 47 branches on 24 April 2016.

On 26 April, 2021, under Section 22 (1) of the Banking Regulation Act, 1949, the RBI has issued an in-principle approval to Uttar Pradesh based Shivalik Mercantile Co-operative Bank Limited for transition into a small finance bank. Thus, it has become India's first urban co-operative bank (UCB) to transition to a Small Finance Bank (SFB).

On 12 October, 2021, RBI granted a Small Finance Bank license to Unity Small Finance Bank, a joint venture between Centrum Financial Services and BharatPe, which was created to take over the assets and liabilities of the crisis-hit PMC Bank. Unity Small Finance Bank began its operations on 1 November 2021 with Inderjit Camotra as its Managing Director and CEO.

The names of the licensees are as below:

Sl.No.	Original licensee/promoter	Commenced	Bank name	Headquarters
1	Ujjivan Financial Services Pvt Ltd	1 February 2017	Ujjivan Small Finance Bank	Bangalore
2	Janalakshmi Financial Services Pvt Ltd	29 March 2018	Jana Small Finance Bank	Bangalore
3	Equitas Holdings Pvt Ltd	5 September 2016	Equitas Small Finance Bank	Chennai
4	Au Financiers India Ltd	19 April 2017	AU Small Finance Bank	Jaipur
5	Capital Local Area Bank Ltd	24 April 2016	Capital Small Finance Bank	Jalandhar
6	ESAF Microfinance	17 March 2017	ESAF Small Finance Bank	Thrissur
7	RGVN North East Microfinance Ltd	17 October 2017	Slice Small Finance Bank	Guwahati
8	Suryoday Microfinance Pvt Ltd	23 January 2017	Suryoday Small Finance Bank	Navi Mumbai
9	Utkarsh Microfinance Pvt Ltd	23 January 2017	Utkarsh Small Finance Bank	Varanasi
10	Shivalik Mercantile Co-operative Bank Ltd	26 April 2021	Shivalik Small Finance Bank	Noida
11	Centrum Financial Services Limited and BharatPe	1 November, 2021	Unity Small Finance Bank	Mumbai
12	Future Financial Services and Disha Microfin		Fincare Small Finance Bank (Merged into AU Small Finance Bank)	

== See also ==
- Banking in India
- List of banks in India
- Reserve Bank of India
- Indian Financial System Code
- List of largest banks
- List of companies of India
- Make in India
- Priority sector lending
- Payments bank
