= V. Vaidyanathan =

Indian businessman

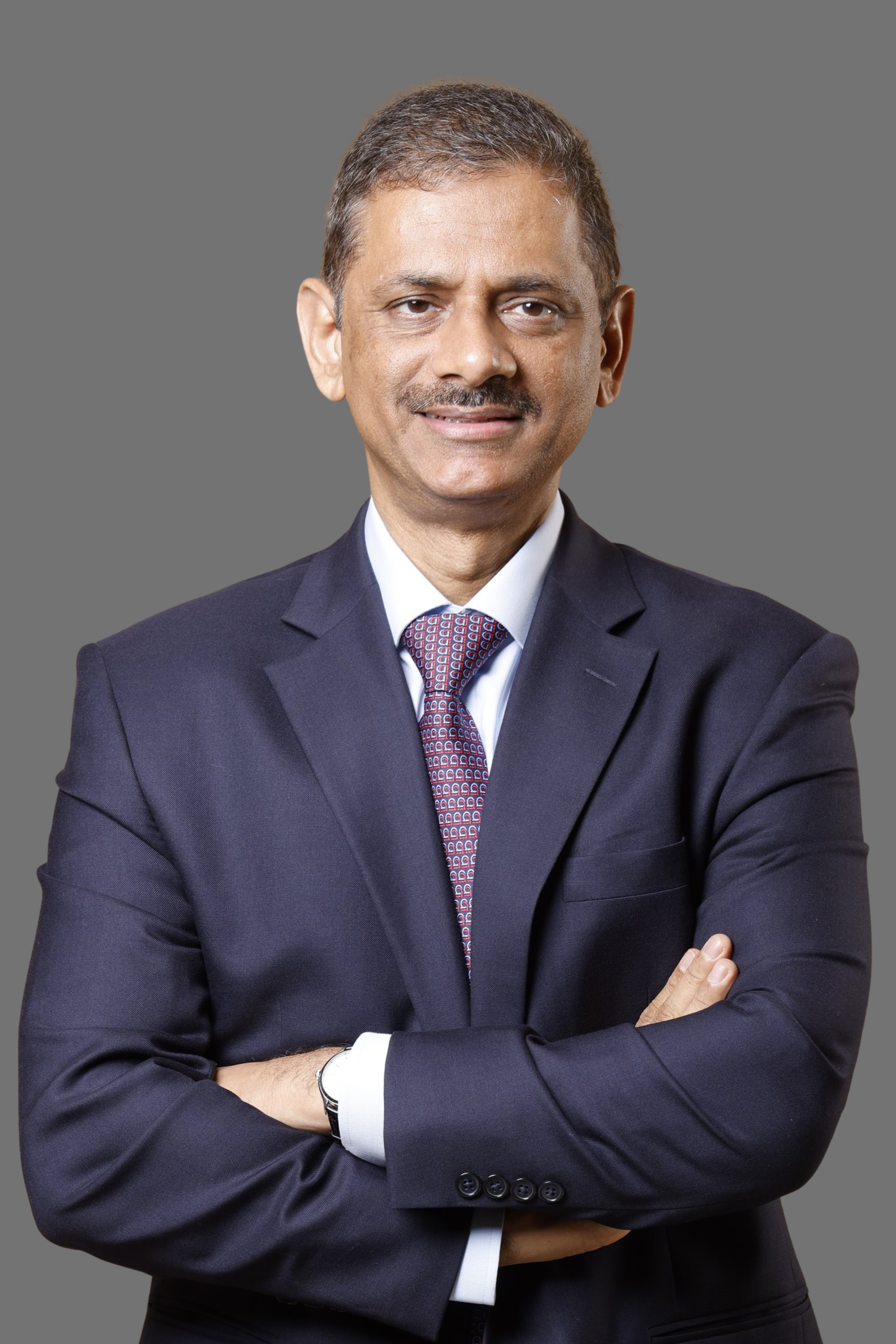
- V. Vaidyanathan in 2025
- Born: 2 January 1968 (age 58)
- Education: Birla Institute of Technology, Mesra
- Occupations: Chairman of Capital First Ltd. MD & CEO of IDFC First Bank
- Awards: Ernst & Young Entrepreneur of the Year, 2022

V. Vaidyanathan (born 2 January 1968) is an Indian banker and entrepreneur, currently serving as the Managing Director and Chief Executive Officer (CEO) of IDFC First Bank, formed after the merger of IDFC Bank and Capital First. Prior to assuming this role, he held the position of Chief Executive Officer at ICICI Prudential Life Insurance and was a member of the Board of Governors at ICICI Bank since 2006.

After a decade-long stint at ICICI, Vaidyanathan acquired a stake in Future Capital Holdings (later known as Capital First), a listed non-bank financial institution which ultimately merged with IDFC Bank to form IDFC First Bank in 2018.

== Early life and education ==
Vaidyanathan was born in Chennai. As a child, he studied at Kendriya Vidyalaya Sangathan's Pathankot school. Subsequently, he chose to enroll in the National Defence Academy and took the Pilot Aptitude Test. As a result, he participated in the Services Selection Board interview, but his medical examination revealed his disqualification due to an eye-related problem.

Vaidyanathan enrolled in the Birla Institute of Technology, Mesra, but ran out of money to buy train tickets. His mathematics teacher then lent him 500 rupees to take a train to help him appear for an interview at Birla Institute of Technology, Mesra. Vaidyanathan searched for him for over 30 years but could not find him. Later, ICICI staff skip-traced his teacher in Agra and Vaidyanathan gifted him one lakh equity shares, amounting to ₹30 lakh (US$32,000) at the time of transfer.

Later, he attended the Advanced Management Program at Harvard Business School.

== Career ==
Vaidyanathan began his career at Citibank, where he worked from 1990 to 2000 in consumer banking. During 1999-2000, he transitioned to ICICI to lead their retail lending operations. He was appointed MD and CEO of ICICI Personal Financial Services (PFS) Limited. After the merger of ICICI Limited with its subsidiary ICICI Bank, he became the Head of Retail Banking at ICICI Bank.

He was later appointed Executive Director on the board of ICICI Bank and became the MD and CEO of ICICI Prudential Life Insurance. He was also the chairman of ICICI Home Finance Company, and served on the Board of ICICI Lombard General Insurance Company, credit bureau CIBIL, and SIDBI's credit rating agency called SMERA.

In 2010, he quit ICICI Bank to acquire a 10% stake in Future Capital Holdings, an NBFC which later became Capital First Ltd. In 2012, the company received a funding of Rs. 8.10 billion from Warburg Pincus.

On 13 January 2018, IDFC Bank and Capital First announced a merger, and Vaidyanathan took over as the MD and CEO of the combined bank.

In September 2023, Vaidyanathan sold 5.07 crore shares of IDFC First Bank for ₹478.7 crore (US$51 million) to US-based GQG Partners through a block trade transaction. From the revenue generated, ₹229 crore (US$24 million) was allocated for the subscription of new shares in IDFC First Bank, ₹240.5 crore (US$26 million) designated for personal income tax settlement, and ₹9.2 crore (US$980,000) directed towards supporting pre-established charitable causes.

On 19 September 2024, the Reserve Bank of India approved his re-appointment as IDFC First Bank's Managing Director and Chief Executive Officer for three years, effective from 19 December 2024.

== Philanthropy ==
In January 2018, he announced that he had donated half a million shares of Capital First, valued at ₹40 crore (US$4.3 million), to Rukmini Foundation which is a social welfare trust to support activities providing education and healthcare support for economically underprivileged children. Some of the initial beneficiaries of the trust are Genesis Foundation which works on the healthcare of children, Samparc who works on the rehabilitation and education of children, and Apnalaya which works in the area of education of slum children in Mumbai.

== Personal life ==
He was born into a family of four siblings. His siblings joined the Indian Air Force and the Indian Army like their father. Vaidyanathan, on the other hand, was the first to join the private sector.

Vaidyanathan is an active marathoner. He ran 8 marathons and 22 half marathons. In his spare time, he plays the guitar.

He lives in Mumbai with his family, consisting of his father, wife, and three children.

== Awards and recognition ==
- "CEO of the Year 2018" by Businessworld
- CNBC Awaaz Entrepreneur of the Year 2020
- 2022 Ernst & Young Entrepreneur of the Year Award (Financial Services)
- 2024 The Financial Express' Banker of The Year.

== Publications ==
=== Book chapters ===
- Bandhopadhya, Tamal (2023). "V Vaidyanathan". Roller Coaster: An Affair With Banking. New Delhi: Jaico Publishing House. p. 340. ISBN 9789393559586.
