= Sanjay Agarwal =

Indian businessman

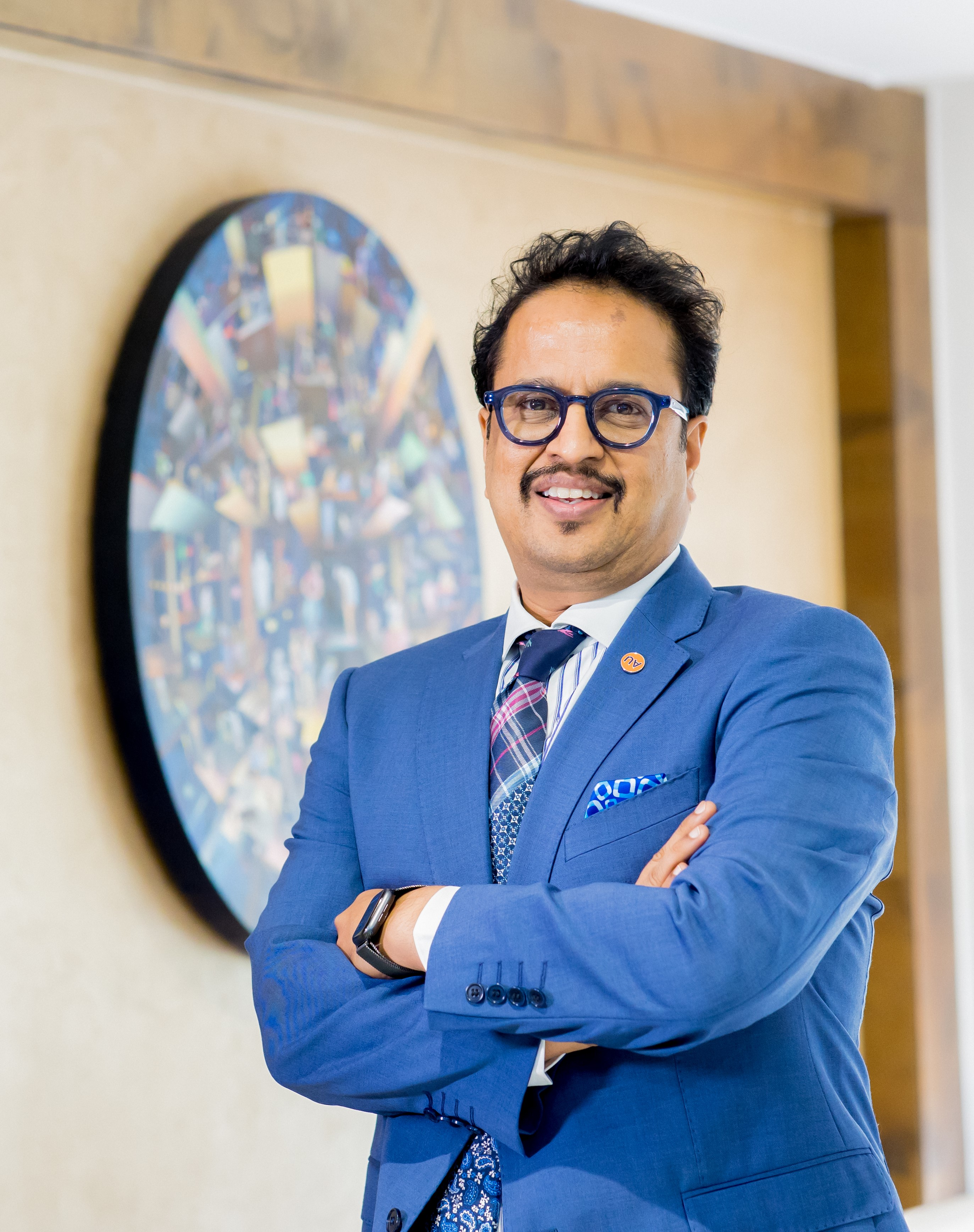
- Agarwal in July 2023
- Education: Government College, Ajmer; Institute of Chartered Accountants of India
- Occupations: MD & CEO of AU Small Finance Bank
- Children: 2
- Awards: Ernst & Young Entrepreneur of the Year, 2018

Sanjay Agarwal is an Indian businessperson and the founder of AU Small Finance Bank, where he has served as the managing director and CEO since April 2017. He was named Ernst & Young Entrepreneur of the Year Award 2018 in financial services.

== Education ==
He has a bachelor's degree in commerce from the Government College, Ajmer. In 1995, he cleared the chartered accountant exam from the Institute of Chartered Accountants of India.

== Career ==
In 1996, Agarwal started Au Financiers, a financing firm in Jaipur to cater to rural and semi-urban Rajasthan, with the help of a few high-net-worth individuals (HNIs) in Jaipur.

Agarwal was first appointed as managing director of Au Financiers on 14 February 2008. In 2015, the Reserve Bank of India introduced the small finance bank (SFB) category in India to encourage financial inclusion. Of the 72 companies that applied for the SFB license, 10 received licenses, including AU Financiers. As the company turned into a small finance bank on 19 April 2017, he became the Managing Director & CEO of AU Small Finance Bank.

In 2017, AU Small Finance Bank went public with an initial public offering. In May 2021, the bank had a valuation of about ₹30,000 crore (US$3 billion) and Agarwal's net worth was about ₹11,597 crore (US$1 billion).

In 2025, the Reserve Bank of India (RBI) granted an 'in-principle' approval to AU Small Finance Bank to transition into a universal bank.

In February 2026, the Reserve Bank of India (RBI) approved a third term for Sanajay Agarwal as the Managing Director of AU Small Finance Bank.

== Awards and recognition ==
- Ernst & Young Entrepreneur of the Year Award 2018.
- Business Leader of the Year Award, 2016 under financial category by Institute of Chartered Accountants of India.

== See also ==
- List of Indian entrepreneurs
- List of people from Rajasthan
