= IDFC First Bank =

Indian private sector bank

IDFC FIRST Bank

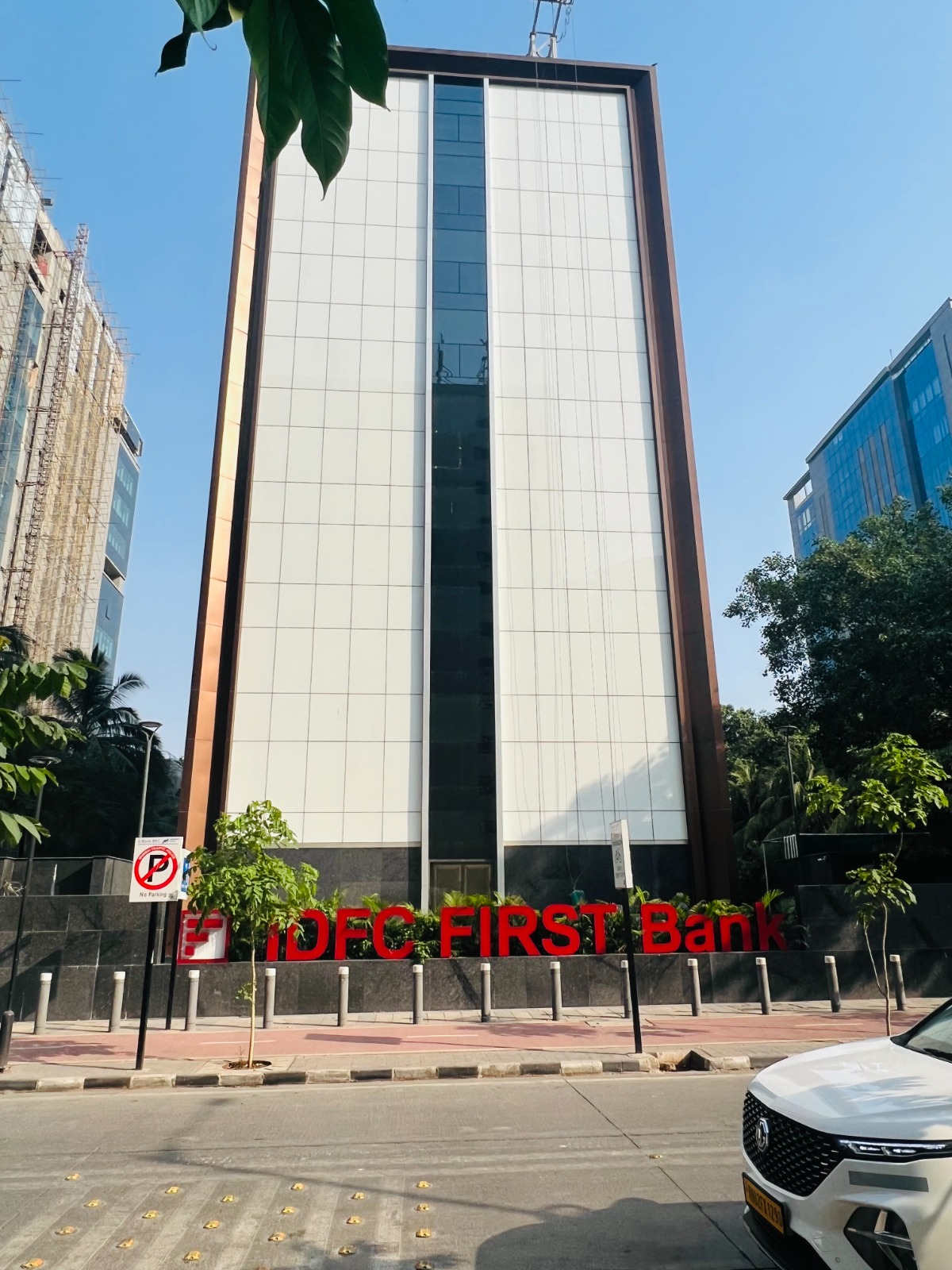
- Headquarters in Bandra Kurla Complex, Mumbai
- Formerly: IDFC Bank (2015–2018)
- Type: Public
- Traded as: BSE: 539437; NSE: IDFCFIRSTB
- ISIN: INE092T01019
- Industry: Banking; Financial services
- Founded: October 2015; 11 years ago
- Headquarters: Mumbai, Maharashtra, India
- Key people: V. Vaidyanathan (MD & CEO)
- Products: Consumer banking; Credit cards; Home loans; Private banking; Wealth management; Investment banking; Corporate banking; Wholesale banking
- Revenue: ▲₹48,422 crore (US$5.2 billion) (2026)
- Operating income: ▼₹7,186 crore (US$770 million) (2026)
- Net income: ▲₹1,611 crore (US$170 million) (2026)
- Total assets: ▲₹399,775 crore (US$43 billion) (2026)
- Total equity: ▲₹47,404 crore (US$5.1 billion) (2026)
- Number of employees: 43,059 (2026)
- Subsidiaries: IDFC FIRST Bharat
- Rating: CRISIL AA+/Stable; Ind-Ra IND AA+/Stable; CARE AA+/Stable (NCDs)
- Website: www.idfcfirst.bank.in

IDFC First Bank (stylised as IDFC FIRST Bank) is an Indian private sector bank based in Mumbai. Founded in 2015 as a banking subsidiary of IDFC Limited, it shifted focus from infrastructure financing to retail banking after its 2018 merger with Capital First. In 2024, IDFC First Bank took over the parent company IDFC Limited in a reverse merger. Before this, the government had the controlling ownership of IDFC Ltd.

== History ==
IDFC Limited was set up in 1997 by the government of India to finance infrastructure projects in India as per the recommendation of an Expert Group setup in 1994 by Department of Economic Affairs, that Group would eventually evolve into the company. With time, the company diversified into asset management, institutional broking and investment banking. In the year 1999 the company was notified as Public Financial Institution.

In 2005, the government of India and IDBI Bank, a public sector bank, were the sponsor shareholders of IDFC. The government brought down its stake to 34.91% from 100% through IDFC's initial public offering in 2005.

In 2014, the Reserve Bank of India granted in-principle approval to IDFC Limited to set up a new bank in the private sector. Following this, the IDFC Limited divested its infrastructure finance assets and liabilities to a new entity - IDFC Bank. The bank was launched through this demerger from IDFC Limited.

Prime Minister of India Narendra Modi officially inaugurated IDFC Bank (now IDFC FIRST Bank) as a subsidiary of IDFC on October 19, 2015, in New Delhi. The bank commenced operations with 23 branches across the country. The parent entity, IDFC Limited, retained the asset management, institutional broking and infrastructure debt fund businesses through IDFC Financial Holding Company Limited (IDFC FHCL).

IDFC Bank faced challenges due to bad loans from legacy infrastructure accounts. A planned merger with the Shriram Group was called off. By September 2017, the bank's deposits totaled ₹38,890 crore, with a CASA ratio of just 8.2%.

=== Capital First merger ===
In January 2018, IDFC Bank and MSME financing company Capital First announced a merger. As per a September 2017 stock filing, Capital First had a retail loan portfolio of ₹229.7 billion. 139 shares of IDFC Bank were issued for every 10 shares of Capital First as part of the merger share swap.

The merger completed in December 2018, with IDFC Bank changing its name to IDFC First Bank. Vaidyanathan took over as the MD and CEO of the merged entity. The RBI approved his appointment for a period of three years, effective from 19 December 2018.

The bank transitioned from infrastructure financing to retail banking in the four years after the merger. By June 2026, CASA ratio increased from 8.7% to 50.8% and retail deposits went up from 27% to 80% of total deposits, amounting to ₹2,38,090 crore (US$25.1 billion) out of ₹2,99,405 crore (US$31.6 billion).

=== Privatization and merger ===
In July 2023, the board of the bank approved the merger with IDFC Limited. After receiving clearance from the Competition Commission of India and the RBI, the merger proposal was approved by the National Company Law Tribunal in May 2024. The proposal, endorsed by the bank's shareholders and NCD holders, involved two steps–IDFC FHCL merging with IDFC Limited, followed by IDFC Limited merging into IDFC First Bank.

On 1 October 2024, IDFC Limited merged with the bank. As a result of the merger, 155 equity shares of the bank were allotted for every 100 equity shares of IDFC Limited held by each shareholder in the latter.

== Shareholding ==
On 22 February 2023, IDFC Limited announced that it would increase its stake in the bank from 36.38% to 40%. On 22 February 2023, the bank issued 12,03,745 equity shares to its employees under the company ESOP plan.

On 12 September 2023, US-based GQG Partners acquired a 0.76% stake from V. Vaidyanathan, increasing its ownership in the bank to 3.36%.

In July 2024, Life Insurance Corporation raised its stake in the bank to 2.68%.

In May 2025, Warburg Pincus initiated the acquisition of a 10% stake by seeking approval from the Competition Commission of India. However, the institutional shareholders rejected the proposal to grant the group a board seat.

== Operations ==
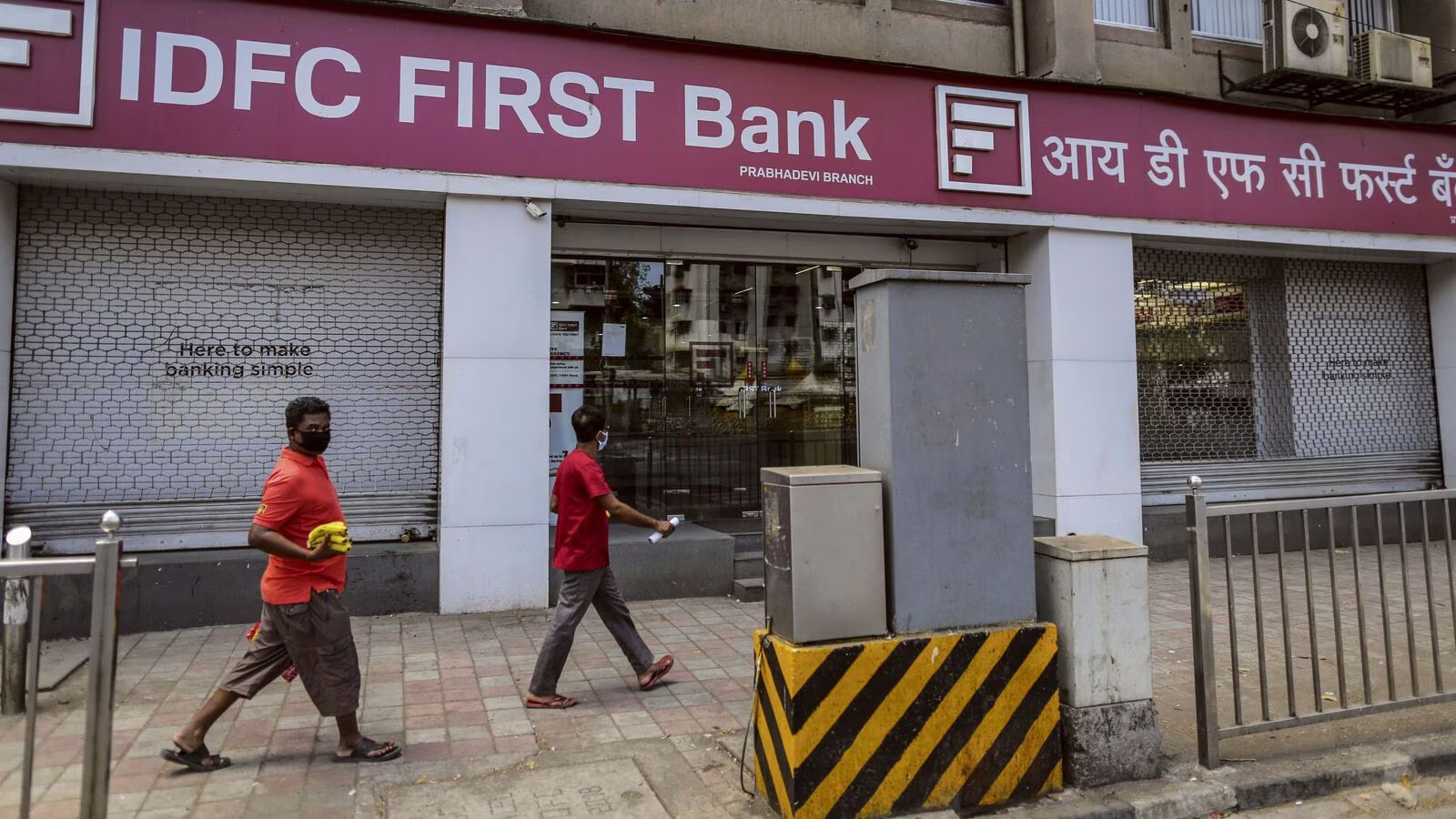
A branch of IDFC First Bank in Prabhadevi, Mumbai

As of 30 June 2026, the bank had 1,155 branches and 1,110 ATMs across India.

=== Products and services ===
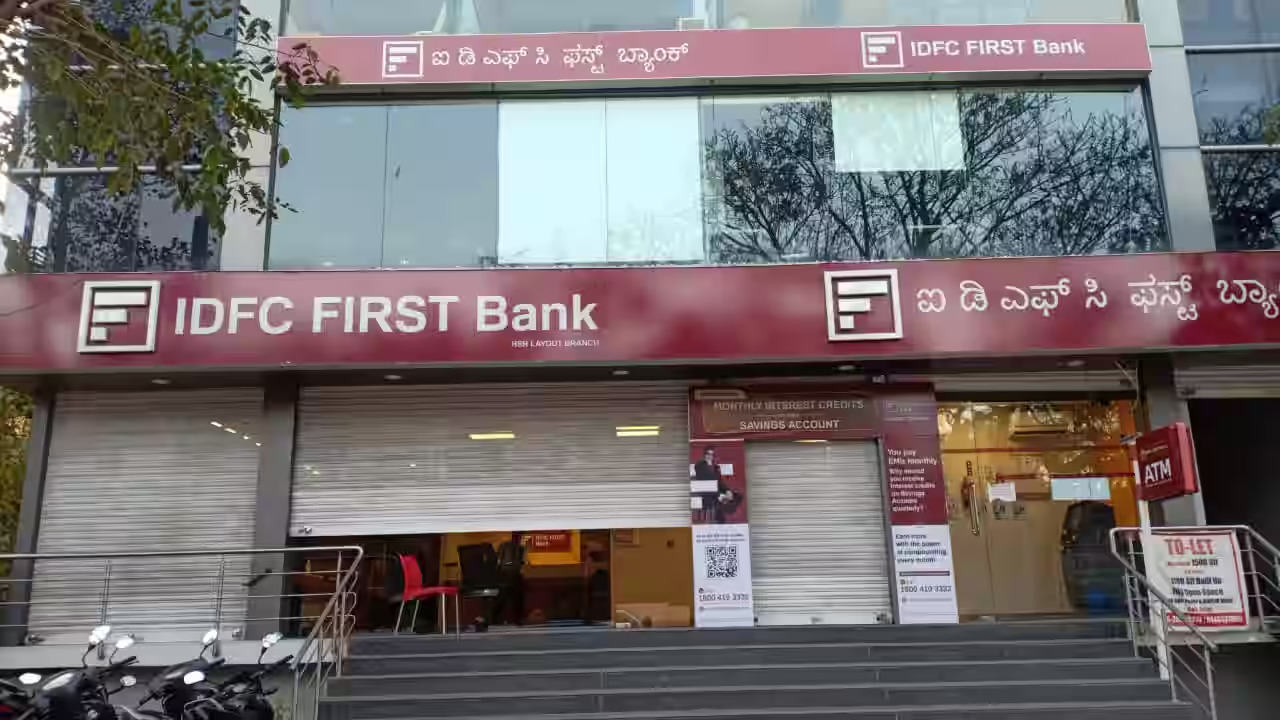
A branch of IDFC First Bank in HSR Layout, Bangalore

The bank provides products and services related to retail banking, wholesale banking and investment banking.

In 2017, IDFC Bank launched an Aadhaar-linked cashless merchant solution.

The bank became a member of the Open Network for Digital Commerce in September 2022. Subsequently, it began enrolling small merchants, who are existing customers with current accounts, onto a partner application registered with ONDC. In 2023, it launched a central bank digital currency under the guidance of the RBI.

=== Rural lending ===
In South and Central India, the rural lending is led by IDFC First Bharat Limited (IFBL) which traces its roots to Grama Vidiyal, a Tamil Nadu-based public charitable trust established in 1986. In 2003, it became a microfinance institution called Grama Vidiyal Micro Finance Limited (GVMFL). In 2016, IDFC Bank acquired GVMFL, turning it into a wholly owned subsidiary of the bank. GVMFL later became known as IDFC First Bharat Limited.

== Financials ==
As of 30 June 2026, the bank reported a capital adequacy ratio of 15.05% under the Basel III framework. The gross non-performing Asset ratio stood at 1.51%, while the net non-performing asset ratio was 0.44%. The bank reported operating income (excluding trading gains) of ₹8,100 crore, core pre-provision operating profit (core PPOP) of ₹2,371 crore, and profit after tax of ₹1,075 crore.

== Philanthropy ==
Under the bank's employee-funded Ghar Ghar Ration program, the bank employees supplied ration kits to 50,000 low income customers whose livelihoods were impacted by the COVID-19 pandemic. As many as 16,000 beneficiaries were reached across Rajasthan, Madhya Pradesh, Maharashtra, Odisha, Gujarat, Karnataka, Haryana, Tamil Nadu, Andhra Pradesh, and Chhattisgarh. The lender also identified 250 vulnerable families who had lost an earning member of their family to COVID-19, with a cash relief support of ₹10,000 in a partnership with Give India.

== Controversies ==
In February 2026, multi-bank financial irregularities involving Haryana government-owned accounts linked to various departments, boards and entities came to light across Chandigarh-area branches of IDFC First Bank, AU Small Finance Bank and Kotak Mahindra Bank. The total amount is estimated at around ₹950 crore. The issue first came to light in January 2026 when the Haryana finance department started the process of closure and transfer of various accounts of the state government, leading to the reconciliation process. This process identified discrepancies across multiple accounts and institutions during the subsequent review. During the course of reconciliation, some accounts of Chandigarh branch of IDFC First Bank were found to have an initial variance of ₹590 crore. On 24 February 2026, before the investigation was completed and before any formal recovery process ended, IDFC First Bank credited ₹578 crore to the accounts of the state departments in the first 24 hours, including ₹556 crore in deposits and ₹22 crore in interest.

== See also ==
- Banking in India
- List of banks in India
- Indian Financial System Code
