= Ujjivan Small Finance Bank =

Small finance bank headquartered in Bengaluru, India

- Type: Public
- Traded as: BSE: 542904; NSE: UJJIVANSFB
- Industry: Small finance bank
- Founded: 1 February 2017
- Headquarters: Bengaluru, Karnataka, India
- Number of locations: 814 branches and 605 ATMs (as of 30 June 2026)
- Area served: India
- Key people: Carol Furtado (Interim CEO)
- Total assets: ₹60,658 crore (2026)
- Total equity: ₹7,144 crore (2026)
- Number of employees: 26,555 (2026)
- Website: www.ujjivansfb.bank.in

Ujjivan Small Finance Bank Limited (Ujjivan SFB) is a banking institution headquartered in Bengaluru, Karnataka. Its predecessor, Ujjivan Financial Services, began operations as a non-banking financial company focused on microfinance in 2005, and Ujjivan Small Finance Bank began operating as a small finance bank on 1 February 2017. As of 30 June 2026, the bank had 814 branches across 347 districts in 26 states and union territories and around 26,555 employees. The bank conducted an initial public offering in 2019, and its shares were listed on the Bombay Stock Exchange and the National Stock Exchange of India. In 2024, Ujjivan Financial Services was amalgamated into Ujjivan Small Finance Bank under a reverse-merger scheme.

== History ==
Ujjivan Financial Services was founded in 2005 by Samit Ghosh as a non-banking financial company (NBFC). On 7 October 2015, Ujjivan Financial Services received an in-principle approval from the Reserve Bank of India (RBI) to set up a small finance bank (SFB). At that time, the company had over 2.6 million customers and 464 branches in 24 states.

Ujjivan received its final banking license from the RBI on 11 November 2016, and Ujjivan Small Finance Bank commenced operations in February 2017. In April 2017, the bank stated that it intended to convert all NBFC branches to SFB branches by the 2020 financial year. It received the Scheduled Bank status from the RBI in August 2017.

In October 2019, Ujjivan Small Finance Bank received approval from the Securities and Exchange Board of India to raise ₹1,200 crores (US$124 million) in an initial public offering (IPO). The IPO opened on 2 December 2019 and the shares were listed on the National Stock Exchange (NSE) and the Bombay Stock Exchange (BSE) on 12 December 2019.

In 2022, the board of Ujjivan Financial Services approved the reverse merger of itself into Ujjivan Small Finance Bank. Ujjivan Financial Services held a 73.5% stake in the bank before the reverse merger. After the completion of the reverse merger in 2024, Ujjivan Small Finance Bank became a fully public-owned bank.

In 2024, Ujjivan Small Finance Bank received an Authorised Dealer Category 1(AD–I) Licence from the RBI, enabling it to provide foreign exchange services.

== See also ==
- Banking in India
- List of banks in India
- Indian Financial System Code
