= Equitas Small Finance Bank =

Small finance bank pvt ltd

Equitas Small Finance Bank.
- Native name: Small bank of Bank india
- Type: Public
- Traded as: NSE: EQUITASBNK; BSE: 543243
- ISIN: INE063P01018
- Industry: Small finance bank
- Founded: 2007
- Headquarters: Phase-II, 4th Floor, Spencer Plaza, No-769, Anna Salai, Chennai, India
- Key people: Arun Ramanathan (Part-time Chairman); Vasudevan P N (MD & CEO)
- Services: Banking, financial services
- Revenue: ▲₹3,641 crore (US$380 million) (FY 2021)
- Net income: ▲₹384 crore (US$40 million) (FY 2021)
- Number of employees: 25,593 (Jan 31, 2025)
- Website: www.equitas.bank.in

Equitas Small Finance Bank (erstwhile Equitas Microfinance Ltd) is a small finance bank founded in 2016 as a microfinance lender. The Bank has its headquarters in Chennai, and is a subsidiary of holding company Equitas Holdings Ltd.

== History ==
After receiving license from the Reserve Bank of India (RBI) on 30 June 2016, Equitas Small Finance bank began banking on 5 September 2016. With effect from 4 February 2017, Equitas became a scheduled bank. However, the company failed to meet the RBI's mandate of listing within three years of starting operations.

Equitas Holding Ltd was originally the promoter holding company of Equitas Small Finance Bank. In February 2023, Equitas Small Finance Bank to satisfy RBI promoter stake dilution requirements, amalgamating the two entities into a single listed banking company.

In November 2014, Equitas Holding raised ₹325 crore in an equity funding round led by German development finance institution DEG (₹100 crore) and Creation Investments (₹113 crore). The round, which valued the company at round ₹2000 crore, also saw participation from FMP, IFC, CDC Group, and Caspian's India Financial Inclusion Fund.

== Operations ==
The bank planned to build a network of 412 branches located in 11 Indian states by the end of fiscal year 2016–17. However, for rendering technology oriented services, 83% of transactions occurring online as of July 2017. This includes the bank providing an RFID sticker to pay road tolls automatically, with settlements occurring digitally.

On 1 March 2018, the bank was penalized ₹1 million (US$10 thousand) by the Reserve Bank of India for rolling out investment, pension, and insurance services without obtaining prior approval.

The bank became a public company via an initial public offering (IPO) in October 2020.

In 2021, Equitas Small Finance Bank partnered with the neobanking company Niyo to launch a mobile banking platform called NiyoX.

On 23 November 2021, the bank announced its partnership with HDFC Bank, for a co-branded credit card.

In 2021, the boards of both Equitas Small Finance Bank and its holding company, Equitas Holding Company, approved a reverse merger between the two companies. The merger was completed in March 2023.

== Philanthropy ==
Equitas Microfinance Ltd established Equitas Development Initiatives Trust (EDIT) in 2008 to provide social services. In 2018, the bank committed 5% of profits to EDIT.

EDIT established Equitas Gurukul Matriculation Schools in 2010. By 2017, the schools were employing 400 people, and educating 5,700 students, primarily from backgrounds that offered limited opportunities. EDIT also has a programme called Equitas Bird's Nest that seeks to help impoverished pavement dwellers. In March 2018, EDIT celebrated the milestone of improving the quality of life for 1,300 families in Chennai through this programme.

== See also ==
- Banking in India
- List of banks in India
- Indian Financial System Code
