= AU Small Finance Bank =

Indian small finance commercial bank

AU Small Finance Bank Limited
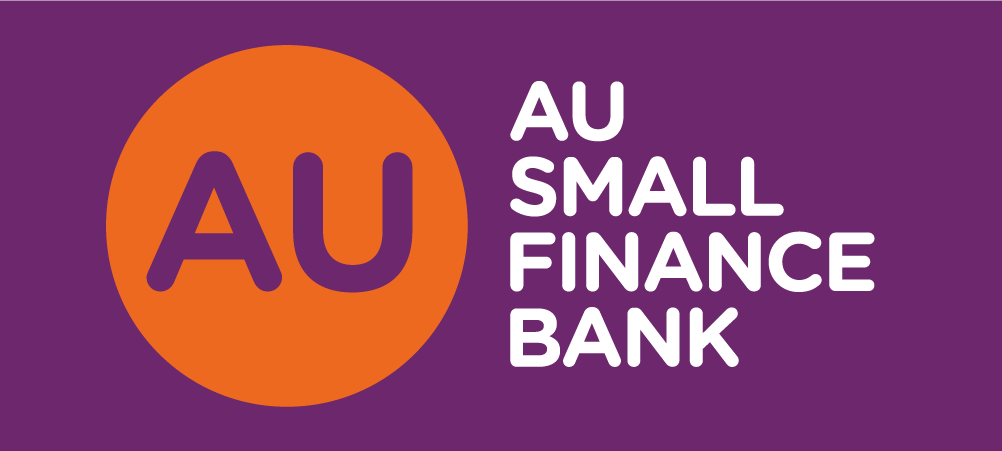
- Type: Public
- Traded as: BSE: 540611; NSE: AUBANK
- ISIN: INE949L01017
- Industry: Banking; Financial services
- Founded: 1996; 30 years ago
- Founder: Sanjay Agarwal
- Headquarters: Jaipur, Rajasthan, India (registered office); BKC, Mumbai, India (corporate office)
- Area served: India
- Key people: H R Khan (Chairman); Sanjay Agarwal (MD & CEO)
- Revenue: ▲₹9,293 crore (US$990 million) (FY23)
- Net income: ▲₹1,427 crore (US$150 million) (FY23)
- Total equity: ▲₹6,275 crore (US$670 million) (2021)
- Number of employees: 59000+
- Rating: CRISIL AA+ Stable
- Website: www.au.bank.in

AU Small Finance Bank Limited is an Indian scheduled commercial small finance bank, headquartered in Mumbai. It was founded in 1996 as a vehicle finance company and was converted into a small finance bank in 2017. That same year, it got listed on National Stock Exchange (NSE) and Bombay Stock Exchange (BSE).

== History ==
The company was founded in 1996 by chartered accountant Sanjay Agarwal as AU Financiers (India) Ltd, a vehicle finance company and an NBFC. It converted into a full-fledged small finance bank on 19 April 2017.

In 2003, the company received the Reserve Bank of India (RBI) registration as an asset financing company. In 2012, associate company AU Insurance Broking Services Private Limited received its Insurance Broking Agency License. And in 2015, RBI also gave an approval to set up a small finance bank.

In the 2013, private equity firm ChrysCapital acquired a 10.01% stake in AU Financiers (now AU Small Finance Bank) for ₹120 crore through secondary market purchases from existing investors and founders.

AU Small Finance Bank listed publicly through an IPO on 29 June 2017. Private equity companies that provided venture capital, including Warburg Pincus and International Finance Corporation, divested their holdings after the listing.

In November 2017, the RBI added the bank to its schedule of commercial banks.

On 7 August 2025, the RBI granted an in-principle approval to AU Small Finance Bank to transition into a universal bank, making it the first small finance bank in India to receive such an approval.

== Operations ==
AU Small Finance Bank has a network of 2,726 physical presence in 21 states and 4 union territories, 59,000+ staff, and a total customer base of about 1.25+ crore as of 30 April 2026.

== Controversies ==
On 18 February 2026, the bank was de-empanelled by the Government of Haryana along with IDFC First Bank. The state government questioned the bank over suspected unauthorised transactions of about ₹72 crore (US$7.7 million), including ₹47 crore (US$5.0 million) transferred in 14 transactions from a government account to a customer account. The bank said the transactions were properly authorised and denied any wrongdoing. Despite that, the bank initiated an internal review, placed certain employees off duty pending the process.

== See also ==
- Banking in India
- List of banks in India
- Indian Financial System Code
