= A Bank for the Buck =

A Bank for the Buck: The Story of HDFC Bank
- First edition
- Author: Tamal Bandyopadhyay
- Language: English
- Genre: Non-fiction
- Published: 2013
- Publication place: India
- Media type: Print/E-book
- Pages: 344

A Bank for the Buck: The Story of HDFC Bank is a book written by Tamal Bandyopadhyay. The book was released at a gathering in Mumbai on 24 November 2012, by the then Finance Minister of India P. Chidambaram.

== Overview ==
During the release of A Bank for the Buck, in November 2012, Chidambaram said, "In a period of great financial illiteracy, it's refreshing to have a book written by somebody very literate about matters relating to finance".

The book describes the birth and the growth of HDFC Bank that was started in 1994, and also looks at the new bank movement over the last few decades.
