= ESAF Small Finance Bank =

Indian small finance bank

- ESAF Small Finance Bank logo since 10 March 2017

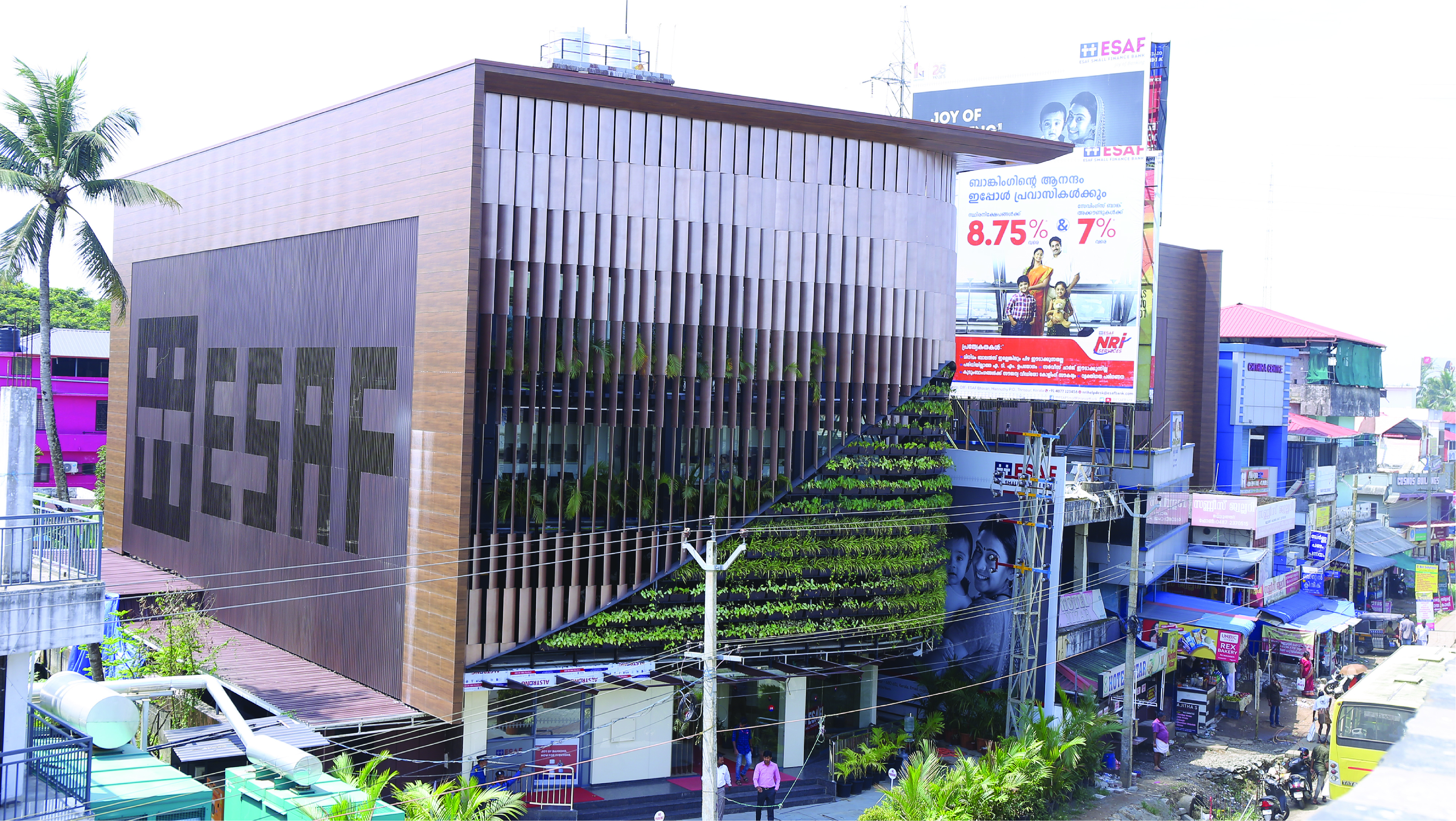
- Registered and corporate office at Mannuthy, Thrissur city
- Formerly: ESAF Microfinance and Investments Pvt. Ltd.
- Type: Public
- Traded as: BSE: 544020; NSE: ESAFSFB
- Industry: Banking
- Founded: 10 March 2017; 9 years ago
- Headquarters: Mannuthy, Thrissur (Registered & Corporate Office)
- Number of locations: 800+ branches (2026)
- Area served: India
- Key people: Karthikeyan Manickam (Part time Chairman & Non-Executive Independent Director); Dr. K. Paul Thomas (MD & CEO)
- Operating income: ▲₹711.97 crore (US$74 million) (FY2026)
- Number of employees: 4,428 (March 2026)
- Website: www.esaf.bank.in

ESAF Small Finance Bank (formerly known as ESAF Microfinance and Investments) is an Indian small finance bank headquartered in Thrissur city , Kerala, providing banking services and small loans to the underbanked.

ESAF Microfinance originated as an NGO in 1992 under the name Evangelical Social Action Forum before receiving a non-banking financial company and microfinance institution (NBFC-MFI) license from the Reserve Bank of India (RBI). It became ESAF Small Finance Bank in 2016 after receiving the first banking license in Kerala since independence.

== History ==
On 11 March 1992, K. Paul Thomas, along with Mereena Paul and a few friends, started ESAF in a small house in Mannuthy named Little. Jacob Samuel, one of the co-founders, coined the name ESAF, which is an acronym for Evangelical Social Action Forum. At inception, ESAF had five life members, seven annual members and eight honorary members. ESAF society was registered under the Travancore Cochin Literary, Scientific and Charitable Societies Registration Act. The initial president was Itty Mathew; J. Danabai was the vice president, Thomas was the secretary, supported by Samuel as joint secretary and Arun Ramakrishnan as treasurer.ESAF started providing interest free loans in 1995 as one of the first microfinance institutions in the country and the first microfinance company in Kerala.

The bank was incorporated on 5 May 2016 as a public limited company. ESAF received a small finance bank (SFB) license from RBI on the 18 November 2016 and commenced banking operations on 10 March 2017. On 17 March 2017, Pinarayi Vijayan, the Chief Minister of Kerala officially inaugurated ESAF Small Finance Bank at Thrissur, Kerala. By August 2017, the bank had 3,750 employees, 284 branches, and a presence in 11 states.

ESAF Small Finance Bank received RBI approval to operate as scheduled bank in December 2018, making it the fifth scheduled bank from Kerala. This will reduce the bank's cost of funds, while increasing the bank's ability and obligation to provide services. The bank's net profit increased to ₹190.39 crore in the 2019-2020 financial year from ₹90.28 crore the previous year.

Following its registration as a Core Investment Company (CIC) with the Reserve Bank of India, the promoter entity was renamed ESAF Financial Holdings Private Limited on 1 March 2019.

On 26 March 2020, the bank received approval from SEBI for issuing its ₹976 crore initial public offering.

In 2026, Karthikeyan Manickam was appointed as the chairman of ESAF SFB.

== Operations ==
As of 31 March 2026, ESAF Small Finance Bank has a network of 804 branches, 720 ATMs and 1047 Customer Service Centres across 24 states and 2 Union Territories. As of March 2026, ESAF Small Finance Bank Ltd. has about 4,428 total employees.

== See also ==
- Banking in India
- List of banks in India
- Indian Financial System Code
