= Svatantra Microfin =

Indian non-banking financial company

Svatantra Microfin Limited
- Type: NBFC-MFI
- Industry: Microfinance
- Founded: February 17, 2012; 14 years ago
- Founder: Ananya Birla
- Headquarters: Mumbai, Maharashtra, India
- Number of locations: 2,123 branches
- Area served: 20 states in India
- Key people: Ananya Birla (promoter & chairperson)
- Revenue: ₹4,120.91 crore (FY26)
- Net income: ₹649.36 crore (FY26)
- AUM: ₹22,000 crore (as of 31 March 2026)
- Number of employees: ~24,000
- Website: svatantramicrofin.com

Svatantra Microfin Limited (Svatantra) is an Indian non-banking financial company–microfinance institution (NBFC-MFI) that lends to borrowers in rural and semi-urban areas of India. Most lending is organised through joint liability groups (JLGs), in which small groups of borrowers are jointly responsible for repayment.

The company received an NBFC-MFI licence from the Reserve Bank of India in 2013 and has grown in part through acquisition, including Micro Housing Finance Corporation in 2018 and Chaitanya India Fin Credit in 2023, the latter formally merged into Svatantra in 2026. According to a CRISIL report, the combined company was the second-largest NBFC-MFI in India by gross portfolio, with assets under management of approximately ₹22,000 crore as of March 2026, including its housing-finance subsidiary.

Svatantra Microfin filed for an initial public offering in 2026 seeking to raise up to $250 million.

== History ==
Svatantra was incorporated in February 2012 by Ananya Birla. It received its NBFC-MFI licence from the RBI the following year and began lending in March 2013; the company has stated that it was the first recipient of this licence category. By the end of 2013, operations had extended into Madhya Pradesh and Uttar Pradesh.

In 2018, Svatantra acquired Micro Housing Finance Corporation for approximately ₹300 crore. The business, which lends to lower-income households in urban India, most of them in the informal sector, was reorganised as a subsidiary, Svatantra Micro Housing Finance Corporation.

In August 2023, Svatantra acquired Chaitanya India Fin Credit (Chaitanya), a microfinance lender founded in 2004 with an established presence in southern India, from the Navi Group for about ₹1,480 crore; the acquisition closed that November. Advent International and Multiples Private Equity invested about ₹1,930 crore in Svatantra the following year, together acquiring a minority stake in the company. In March 2026, the National Company Law Tribunal approved the amalgamation of Chaitanya and Svatantra Holdings Private Limited into Svatantra, with the scheme taking effect later that month and Svatantra as the resulting company; Svatantra Micro Housing Finance Corporation remained a wholly owned subsidiary after the merger.

== Operations ==
As of 31 March 2026, Svatantra operated 2,123 branches across 20 states and 394 districts, with 24,594 employees, including 15,575 field officers, serving approximately 4.27 million active microfinance borrowers. Its microfinance lending is organised primarily through joint liability groups, under which borrowers, most of whom are women in rural and semi-urban areas, jointly guarantee each other's repayment. Loans are disbursed as cashless transfers directly to borrowers' bank accounts.

== Recognition ==
- Skoch Financial Inclusion and Deepening Award
- Sach Bharat Samman (at the Sach Bharat Confluence)
