= LenDenClub =

P2P lending platform

Coordinates: 19°10′27.5797″N 72°50′39.9833″E

- Type: Private
- Industry: Financial
- Founded: 2015
- Headquarters: Lendenclub house, Data mandir road, next to COD, Malad east, Mumbai-400098, India
- Area served: India
- Key people: Bhavin Patel (Co-Founder & CEO); Dipesh Karki (Co-founder & CTO)
- Parent: Innofin Solutions
- Website: lendenclub.com

LenDenClub is an Indian P2P lending platform owned and operated by Innofin Solutions. Founded in 2015, the company's headquarters are situated in Mumbai, India.

== History ==
LenDenClub was founded by Bhavin Patel and Dipesh Karki in 2015 as a web-based platform. In 2016, the company received funding in a seed round led by Venture Catalysts and launched an Android-based application to connect borrowers with individual lenders. As of 2016, LenDenClub had 700 lenders and 1,120 borrowers. In 2018, LenDenClub raised another $1.5 million in its Pre-series A round, and its parent company Innofin received a license from Reserve Bank of India to operate as an NBFC-P2P company. By 2019, the company expanded its operations to six states. In December 2019, the RBI increased the lending limit on P2P platforms to Rs 50 lakh, up from the previous limit of Rs 10 lakh.

In 2021, LenDenClub was chosen to participate in the Microsoft for Startups program and its co-founders Bhavin Patel and Dipesh Karki were featured in the Businessworld's BW Disrupt 40 Under 40 list. LenDenClub works with fintech companies such as BharatPe, PhonePe, Google Pay, and announced its collaboration with Samir Kochhar, to launch its first brand campaign.

In December 2021, LenDenClub received $10 million in series A round funding, with participation from various investors at a valuation of $51 million. In 2022, the company launched a Fixed-Maturity P2P Plan (FMPP), which enables its members to lend money for a fixed tenure. In April 2022, 'LenDenClub Alpha,' a corporate venture, was launched to provide mentorship and support to early-stage startups during their seed and pre-Series stages. Also, in October, LenDenClub started The Bharat Fintech Program’ in association with Reseau and announced a ₹2 crores investment in rural fintech startups. The company participated in a fundraise round for Hubbler, a no-code platform. LenDenClub is the first P2P lending company to enable ESOP (Employee Stock Ownership Plan) liquidation for its employees. In 2023, LenDenClub appointed Indian cricketer Hardik Pandya as its brand ambassador.

The RBI fined Lendencub Rs 1.99 crores in February 2024 for violating P2P lending and digital lending norms after a statutory inspection found non-compliance with NBFC-P2P guidelines and Management responded accordingly.

== Awards ==
- Deloitte Tech Fast 50
