= State Bank of Mauritius =

Commercial bank

SBM Bank (Mauritius) Ltd
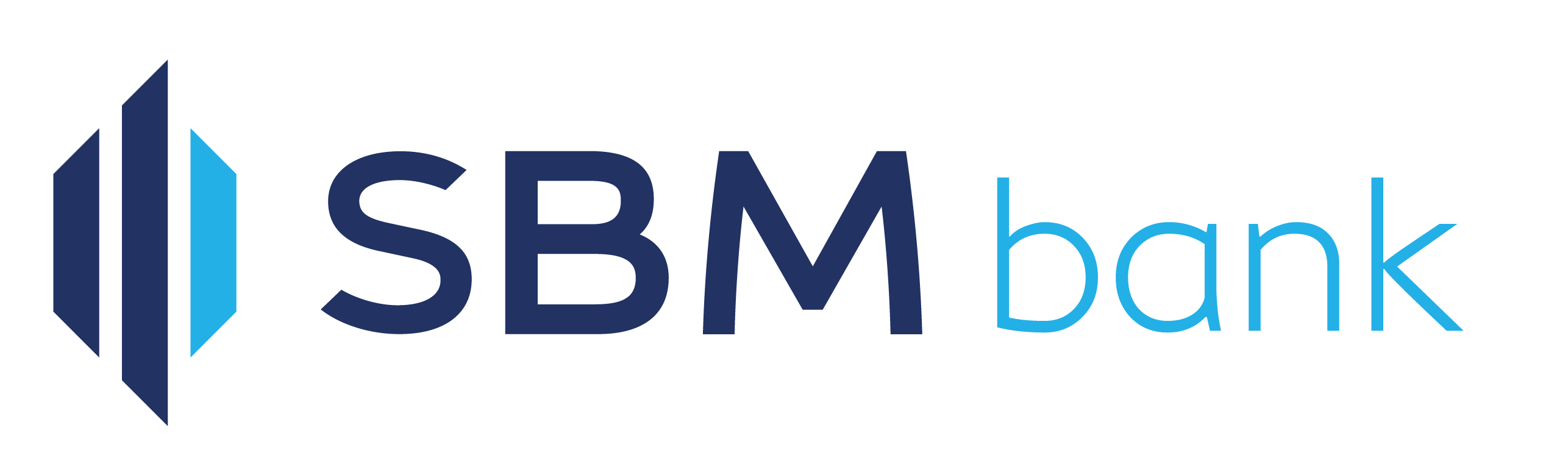
- Type: Public
- Traded as: SEM: SBM
- Industry: Finance and Insurance
- Founded: 1973
- Headquarters: Port Louis, Mauritius
- Products: Banking
- Number of employees: 2,717
- Parent: SBM Holdings Ltd
- Subsidiaries: SBM Bank (Mauritius) Ltd; Banque SBM Madagascar; SBM Bank (Seychelles) Limited; SBM Bank India Limited; SBM Africa Holdings Ltd; SBM Bank (Kenya) Limited; SBM Capital Markets Lt; SBM Factors Ltd; SBM Insurance Agency Ltd; SBM Funds Services Ltd; SBM Leasing Co.Ltd; SBM (NFC) Holdings Ltd

State Bank of Mauritius (SBM), is a bank in Mauritius that the Bank of Mauritius, the national banking regulator, has licensed as a commercial bank.

SBM is the second-largest bank in Mauritius with a market share of about 25% of domestic banking assets. As of June 2011, its total asset valuation was approximately US$3.34 billion (MUR:95.7 billion), with shareholders' equity of about US$557.1 million (MUR:16 billion).

SBM, together with its subsidiary businesses in Kenya, Mauritius, Madagascar and India, is known as SBM Group. The stock of the group is listed on the Stock Exchange of Mauritius and is owned by nearly 17,000 domestic and International shareholders. SBM has about 1,900 employees and services about 527,000 customers through its network of 48 service units and counters in Mauritius, India, Madagascar, and Kenya.

== History ==
The government of Mauritius established State Bank of Mauritius in 1973 under the name State Commercial Bank. In 1994, SBM opened its first overseas branch in Mumbai, India. In 1995, the bank was listed on the Stock Exchange of Mauritius. Then in 1997 the South African bank Nedcor acquired 20.1% of SBM's voting equity. That same year SBM opened its second branch in India in Chennai, and the next year one in Hyderabad, India.

Banque SBM Madagascar, a fully owned subsidiary of SBM, started banking operations in Madagascar in January 1998. The company operates from Antananarivo, the capital of Madagascar. The next year, SBM and Nedcor established SBM Nedcor International (SNI) as a 50/50 joint venture to engage in offshore banking, and SNI started operations in 2000. In order to avoid any conflict of interest with SBI International, Mauritius (formerly State Bank International), another joint venture offshore company between SBM and State Bank of India, SBM disinvested its 49 percent equity holding in SBI International. In 2005, Nedcor sold back to SBM its 20.1% in the latter, and at the same time took over 100% ownership of SNI. Then Nedcor announced the sale of SNI to Sasfin Bank, which will rename the bank Sasfin Bank International (SBI).

In November 2016, SBM Group announced that it has reached an agreement to acquire a majority stake in Kenya based Fidelity Commercial Bank Limited. This process was conclude in May 2017 and the bank's name was changed to SBM Bank (Kenya) Limited.

== Branches ==
The bank maintains 43 networked branches and 35 freestanding automated teller machines in Mauritius.

== See also ==
- List of banks in Africa
- List of banks in Mauritius
- List of Mauritian companies
- Economy of Mauritius
