= Unity Small Finance Bank =

Indian small finance bank

- Type: Private
- Industry: Banking
- Founded: 2021
- Headquarters: New Delhi, India
- Number of locations: 334 branches
- Area served: India
- Key people: Inderjit Camotra (MD & CEO)
- Products: Banking, loans, deposits and financial services
- Parent: Centrum Capital and BharatPe
- Website: unity.bank.in

Unity Small Finance Bank Limited is an Indian small finance bank headquartered in New Delhi. It commenced operations as a small finance bank on 1 November 2021 after receiving licence from Reserve Bank of India.

Unity Small Finance Bank is pioneering the use of hyperautomation to streamline its operations, improve productivity, and elevate customer experiences.

== History ==
Unity Small Finance Bank was established by Centrum Financial and BharatPe. Centrum Financial holds a 51% stake in Unity Small Finance Bank and is the bank's promoter, while Resilient Innovations, the parent company of BharatPe, holds the remaining 49%.

In October 2021, the RBI granted Unity Small Finance Bank a licence to conduct the business of a small finance bank in India. The bank commenced operations on 1 November 2021.

In 2026, BharatPe and Centrum Financial Services were involved in a dispute over a proposed increase in Unity Small Finance Bank's authorised share capital. The Delhi High Court restrained the bank from proceeding with the increase without BharatPe's written consent.

== Amalgamation of PMC Bank ==
Unity Small Finance Bank was selected as the transferee bank for the amalgamation of Punjab and Maharashtra Co-operative Bank. The RBI had placed PMC Bank under regulatory restrictions in September 2019 following financial irregularities at the cooperative bank.

Under the Punjab and Maharashtra Co-operative Bank Limited (Amalgamation with Unity Small Finance Bank Limited) Scheme, 2022, the business, assets and liabilities of PMC Bank were transferred to Unity Small Finance Bank.

A group of PMC Bank depositors challenged the amalgamation. In March 2026, the Bombay High Court upheld the merger of PMC Bank with Unity Small Finance Bank, ruling it protects depositors' interests and ensures full repayment.

== Management ==
Inderjit Camotra serves as the managing director and chief executive officer of Unity Small Finance Bank. Currently bank is searching for a new managing director and chief executive officer as Inderjit Camotra's second term is scheduled to end in August 2026.

== Partnerships ==
In 2025, Fintech Farm launched Roarbank in India in partnership with Unity Small Finance Bank. Roarbank is a digital banking product offered by Unity Small Finance Bank. It combines a savings account with a RuPay credit card and UPI functionality.
