= Slice Small Finance Bank =

Indian small finance bank

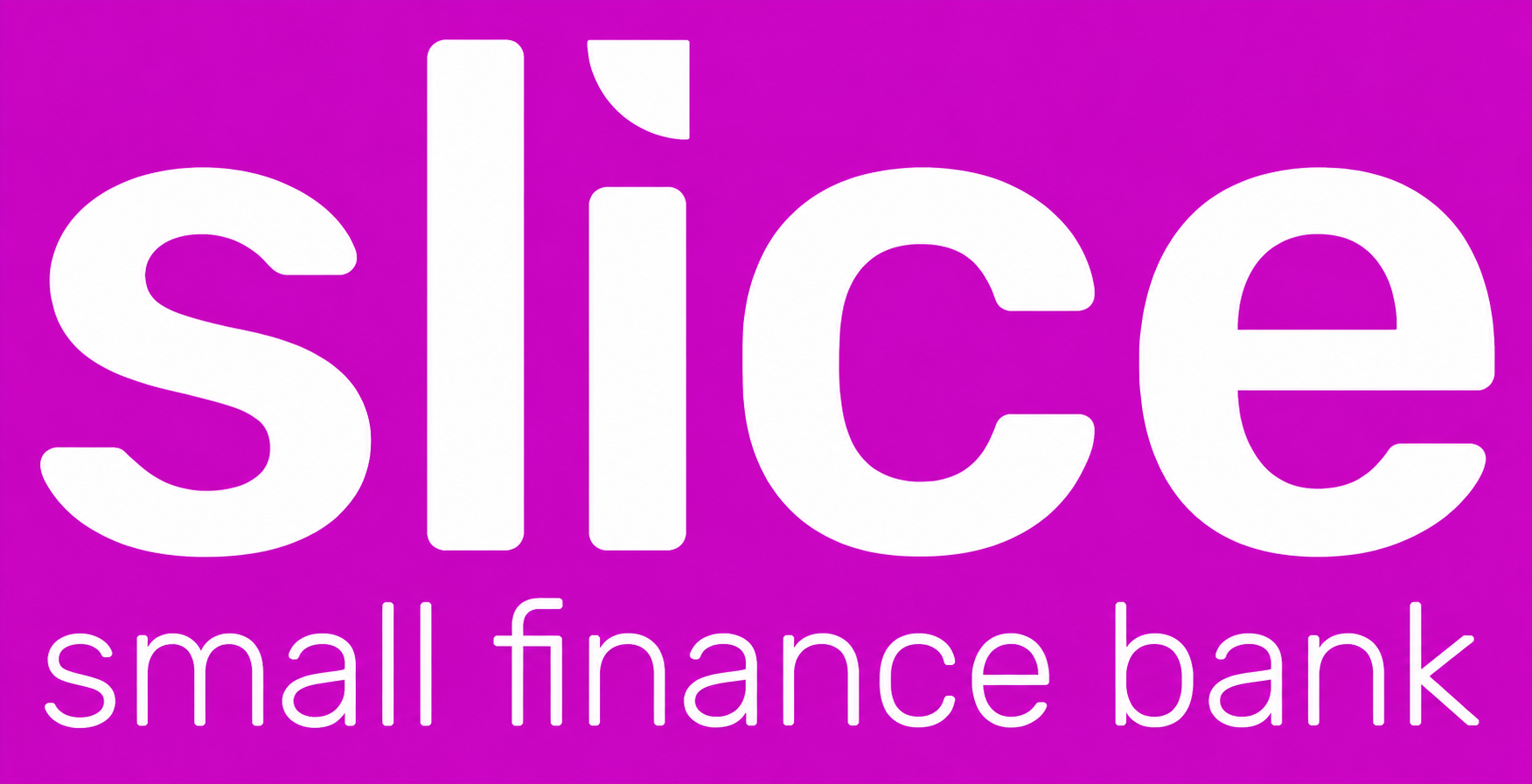
- Type: Private
- Industry: Small finance bank Financial technology
- Predecessors: Slice; North East Small Finance Bank
- Founded: January 2016; 10 years ago
- Founder: Rajan Bajaj
- Headquarters: Bengaluru, Karnataka, India (corporate); Guwahati, Assam, India (registered)
- Area served: India
- Key people: Rajan Bajaj (MD & CEO)
- Revenue: ▲₹1,403 crore (US$150 million) (FY2025-26)
- Net income: ▲₹48.4 crore (US$5.0 million) (FY2025-26)
- Website: www.slice.bank.in

Slice Small Finance Bank (doing business as slice) is an Indian small finance bank based in Bengaluru. It was formed as a result of the merger between fintech company Slice and North East Small Finance Bank (NESFB).

== History ==
=== Slice ===
Slice was founded in January 2016 as SlicePay, a fintech company offering buy now, pay later and credit lines for students and young professionals. In January 2019, the company received a non-banking financial company (NBFC) license from the Reserve Bank of India (RBI). Later that year, Slice launched its prepaid card in partnership with Visa and SBM Bank India.

In November 2021, Slice became a unicorn company, after raising about $220 million. By mid-2022, it was reportedly issuing over 300,000 prepaid cards per month, having positioned itself as a credit card challenger. However, after the RBI's June 2022 directive barring NBFC companies from issuing credit lines on prepaid payment instruments, the company discontinued prepaid cards to comply with the new norms.

=== NESFB merger ===
North East Small Finance Bank (NESFB) was established in July 2016, and was one of the 10 financial institutions to be granted a small finance bank license by the RBI in 2015.

In October 2023, Slice announced that it would merge with North East Small Finance Bank (NESFB), marking the first instance of a fintech company merging with a bank in India. The merger was completed in October 2024 after regulatory scrutiny. The merged entity was renamed as Slice Small Finance Bank in May 2025.

== Funding ==
As of December 2024, Slice had raised $387 million in funding across multiple rounds from investors such as Tiger Global, Insight Partners, and Blume Ventures.

In September 2026, Slice raised another $100 million from investors including Moore Strategic Capital, asset manager Neo Wealth, Japan's Kado Global, Indian stock broking startup Dhan, former journalist-turned-advisor Manish Singh, angel investor Better Advisors, Blume Ventures and DSP Investment. The investment valued Slice at about $450 million.

== See also ==
- Neobank
- Banking in India
- List of banks in India
- Indian Financial System Code
