= Priority Sector Lending Certificates =

Priority Sector Lending Certificates are a tool for promoting comparative advantages among banks while they meet their priority sector lending obligations in India. "Banks with a comparative advantage in lending to the priority sector should earn priority sector lending certificates [social credits] while those falling short of the target would be required to buy priority sector lending certificates [social credits]." "A forward market for Priority Sector Lending Certificates [social credits] will help banks to focus and plan better." Total credit extended by banks in priority sector lending was INR 21,543,562.9 million (US$322,361 million as of June 2016) towards the end of financial year 2015. The goal of Priority Sector Lending Certificates is to create market-efficiency in priority sector lending "to increase employment, create basic infrastructure and improve competitiveness of the economy, thus creating more jobs Priority Sector Lending Certificates is a method for directing credit and could be used in Asia and other parts of the world as an alternative method for directing credit.

== Types ==
As priority sector lending has sub-targets in addition to an overall target there are types of Priority Sector Lending Certificates (PSLCs). The four types of Priority Sector Lending Certificates are:

- PSLC Agriculture: Priority Sector Lending Certificates for agriculture lending sub-target.
- PSLC SF/MF: Priority Sector Lending Certificates for small and marginal Farmers lending sub-target.
- PSLC Micro Enterprises: Priority Sector Lending Certificates for micro enterprises lending sub-target.
- PSLC General: Priority Sector Lending Certificates corresponding to the overall priority sector lending target.

Additional types of Priority Sector Lending Certificates would be required for other lending sub-targets.

== Non-Transfer of credit risk and consistent use with inter-bank participation certificates and securitization ==
The selling or purchase of Priority Sector Lending Certificates does not cause a transfer of credit risk as Priority Sector Lending Certificates do not cause any change in the lender of any loan i.e. the lender is not replaced. Priority Sector Lending Certificates is different from Securitization as the latter involves a transfer of credit risk. "Priority Sector Lending Certificates [Social credits] may be used in conjunction with inter-bank Participation Certificates or securitization of priority-sector lending portfolios".

== Market-based pricing ==
Priority Sector Lending Certificates "would be priced by the market. The basic framework for pricing Priority Sector Lending Certificates [social credits] would incorporate the risk-free rate, default rate and cost of operations." As Priority Sector Lending Certificates are priced based on credit risk hence it is a type of credit derivative. IndiaRatings "expects the PSLCs to be priced between 1 per cent to 3 per cent...depending on the PSL sub-segment deficit of the buyer". Alternative pricing models would be based on the price of penalties if the price of penalties is lower than what the price would be otherwise. In order to avoid a scenario wherein banks prefer to pay penalties rather than comply with priority sector lending obligations the imposition of "large monetary fines and/or partially revoke banking licences if a bank does not reach its targets" is required. If and when "the price of a Priority Sector Lending Certificate [social credit] is close to zero consistently, then we know that targets are not needed" The cost of operations related to priority sector lending may make a significant part of the price of Priority Sector Lending Certificates. Government "can intervene by buying the Priority Sector Lending Certificates [social credits] in the market this would push up the price. " Market based pricing of Priority Sector Lending Certificates induces a "market-driven incentive for efficiency". In the first quarter year of 2016-17 Priority Sector Lending Certificates were traded at a premium in the range of 3-5 per cent.

== Lot size and amount eligible for issue ==
"The Priority Sector Lending Certificates would have a standard lot size of INR 2.5 million of multiples thereof...Normally PSLCs will be issued against the underlying assets. However, with the objective of developing a strong and vibrant market for PSLCs, a bank is permitted to issue PSLCs upto [sic] 50 percent of previous year’s PSL achievement without having the underlying in its books. However, as on the reporting date, the bank must have met the priority sector target by way of the sum of outstanding priority sector lending portfolio and net of PSLCs issued and purchased." .

== Expiry ==
All Priority Sector Lending Certificates will expire by the end of the financial year. The same underlying priority sector loan which is outstanding in the next financial year, like any new priority sector loan, will be considered towards calculating the Priority Sector Lending Certificates in case the priority sector lending target is exceeded.

== Rewards and Penalties ==
"To the extent of shortfall in the achievement of target, banks may be required to invest in RIDF (Rural infrastructure development fund)/other funds as hitherto." Penalties are as essential as the carrot (of allowing banks to stay away from direct lending and taking credit risk in the priority sector; compensating those banks that exceed their priority sector lending target) and so the "carrot should be flanked by the stick."

== Different from a cap and trade system ==
Priority Sector Lending certificates have similarities with cap and trade systems like Carbon Credits. The similarities include: system level target and tradable nature of the credits. A major difference between Priority Sector Lending Certificates and carbon credits is in the nature of the targets: lending versus a negative externality (environmental pollution). The targets in the case of Priority Sector Lending Certificates are a floor and not a cap.

== Background ==
Tradable Priority Sector Lending Certificates was first proposed by A.M. Godbole in his article "How to lend more to the poor" (Mint, 28 March 2007). A.M. Godbole had called tradable Priority Sector Lending Certificates as 'social credits'. On 7 April 2008 (in a draft report) and on 12 September 2008 (in a final report) the High-Level Committee on Financial Sector Reforms recommended the introduction of Priority Sector Lending Certificates. On 7 April 2016 the portal for trading Priority Sector Lending Certificates was launched by the Reserve Bank of India. Within twelve months of the launch of the Priority Sector Lending Certificates portal for trading, a total of INR 430.1 billion (US$6.63 billion as of 31 March 2017) of PSLC SF/MF and PSLC General by volume was traded.

Serial number	Year, Month & Year, Date	Event
1	28 March 2007	Tradable Priority Sector Lending Certificates is proposed for the first time. It is called 'social credits'
2	31 December 2007	Tradable credits is proposed for Insurance for the first time. It is called 'microinsurance credits'
3	January 2008	Tradable 'microinsurance credits' is cited in a USAID document
4	7 April 2008	High-Level Committee on Financial Sector Reforms recommends the introduction of 'social credits' (calls it Priority Sector Lending Certificates in its draft report)
5	12 September 2008	High-Level Committee on Financial Sector Reforms recommends the introduction of 'social credits' (calls it Priority Sector Lending Certificates in its final report)
6	2010	Reserve Bank of India sets-up a Working Group to examine the issues involved in the introduction of PSLCs and make suitable recommendations.
7	21 February 2012	Reserve Bank of India constituted M.V. Nair Committee recommends "allowing non-tradable priority sector lending certificates (PSLCs) on pilot basis with domestic scheduled commercial banks, foreign banks and regional rural banks as market players".
8	28 February 2015	Government of India Ministry of Finance Department of Financial Services proposes introduction of Priority Sector Lending Certificates.
9	1 March 2015	Reserve Bank of India Internal Working Group recommends introduction of priority sector lending certificates (PSLCs) which will enable banks to meet their PSL requirements even while leveraging their comparative advantage in lending.
10	23 April 2015	Reserve Bank of India says in its Notification on "Priority Sector Lending - Targets and Classification" that "The outstanding priority sector lending certificates (after the guidelines are issued in this regard by the Reserve Bank of India) bought by the banks will be eligible for classification under respective categories of priority sector provided the assets are originated by banks, and are eligible to be classified as priority sector advances and fulfil the Reserve Bank of India guidelines on priority sector lending certificates."
11	7 April 2016	Reserve Bank of India issues Notification on "Priority Sector Lending Certificates" and issues instructions on trading in PSLCs.
12	7 April 2016	Reserve Bank of India Deputy Governor S.S. Mundra launches portal for trading in Priority Sector Lending Certificates.
13	24 May 2016	Reserve Bank of India issues Frequently Asked Questions (Updated on 22 Nov 2016)

== Criticism ==
Reserve Bank of India Deputy Governor R. Gandhi said that "PSL certificates, which will be eligible for classification under respective categories of priority sector, bought by banks, may dent the growth of securitised market." No reason has been shared for this assertion.

== Alternatives ==
A direct tax combined with a system for delivering credit to the priority sector could be an alternative to Priority Sector Lending targets. If there are no Priority Sector Lending targets then this would obviate the need for Priority Sector Lending Certificates.

== See also ==
- Priority sector lending
- Carbon Credit
