= Priority sector lending =

In India, lending to underserved economic sectors

Priority sector lending is lending to those sectors of the economy which may not otherwise receive timely and adequate credit. This role is assigned by the Reserve Bank of India to the banks for providing a specified portion of the bank lending to few specific sectors like agriculture and allied activities, micro- and small enterprises, education, housing for the poor, and other low-income groups and weaker sections. This is essentially meant for an all-round development of the economy as opposed to focusing only on the financial sector.

== Categories of priority sector ==
The broad categories of priority sector for all scheduled commercial banks are as under:

(i) Agriculture and Allied Activities (Direct and Indirect finance): Direct finance to agriculture shall include short, medium and long term loans given for agriculture and allied activities directly to individual farmers, Self-Help Groups (SHGs) or Joint Liability Groups (JLGs) of individual farmers without limit and to others (such as corporate, partnership firms and institutions) up to Rs. 20 lakh, for taking up agriculture/allied activities.

Indirect finance to agriculture shall include loans given for agriculture and allied activities as specified in Section I, appended.

This distinction between direct and indirect agriculture is dispensed with. Instead, the lending to agriculture sector has been re-defined to include (i) Farm Credit (which will include short-term crop loans and medium/long-term credit to farmers) (ii) Agriculture Infrastructure and (iii) Ancillary Activities,

(ii) Small Scale Industries (Direct and Indirect Finance): Direct finance to small scale industries (SSI) shall include all loans given to SSI units which are engaged in manufacture, processing or preservation of goods and whose investment in plant and machinery (original cost) excluding land and building does not exceed the amounts specified in Section I, appended.

Indirect finance to SSI shall include finance to any person providing inputs to or marketing the output of artisans, village and cottage industries, hand-looms and to cooperatives of producers in this sector.

(iii) Small Business / Service Enterprises: shall include small business, retail trade, professional & self-employed persons, small road & water transport operators and other service enterprises as per the definition given in Section I and other enterprises that are engaged in providing or rendering of services, and whose investment in equipment does not exceed the amount specified in Section I, appended.

(iv) Micro Credit : Provision of credit and other financial services and products of very small amounts not exceeding Rs. 50,000 per borrower to the poor in rural, semi-urban and urban areas, either directly or through a group mechanism, for enabling them to improve their living standards, will constitute micro credit.

(v) Education loans: Education loans include loans and advances granted to only individuals for educational purposes up to Rs. 10 lakh for studies in India and Rs. 20 lakh for studies abroad, and do not include those granted to institutions;

(vi) Housing loans: Loans up to Rs. 35 lakh in metropolitan cities where population is above 10 lakh and Rs. 25 Lakh at other center s for construction/purchase of a dwelling unit per family provided total cost of the unit in metropolitan centres and at other centres does not exceed Rs. 45 Lacs and Rs. 30 Lacs respectively. (excluding loans granted by banks to their own employees) and loans given for repairs to the damaged houses of individuals up to Rs.5 lakh in metropolitan centres and Rs. 2 Lakh at other centres.

(2) Investments by banks in securitised assets, representing loans to agriculture (direct or indirect), small scale industries (direct or indirect) and housing, shall be eligible for classification under respective categories of priority sector (direct or indirect) depending on the underlying assets, provided the securitised assets are originated by banks and financial institutions and fulfill the Reserve Bank of India guidelines on securitisation. (3) Under Weaker Sections : Priority sector loans to the following borrowers are considered under Weaker Sections category:-

(a) Small and marginal farmers;

(b) Artisans, village and cottage industries where individual credit limits do not exceed Rs 1 Lakh;

(c) Beneficiaries of Swarnajayanti Gram Swarozgar Yojana (SGSY), now National Rural Livelihood Mission (NRLM);

(d) Scheduled Castes and Scheduled Tribes;

(e) Beneficiaries of Differential Rate of Interest (DRI) scheme;

(f) Beneficiaries under Swarna Jayanti Shahari Rozgar Yojana (SJSRY);

(g) Beneficiaries under the Scheme for Rehabilitation of Manual Scavengers (SRMS);

(h) Loans to Self Help Groups;

(i) Loans to distressed farmers indebted to non-institutional lenders;

(j) Loans to distressed persons other than farmers not exceeding Rs 1 Lakh per borrower to prepay their debt to non-institutional lenders;

(k) Loans to individual women beneficiaries up to Rs 1 Lakh per borrower. (L) also called or known as priority sector advancement (PSA);

(m) Account holders under Pradhan Mantri Jan Dhan Yojana (PMJDY)

(vii) Renewable energy sector has also been added to priority sector lending in the year 2015.

== See also ==
- Priority Sector Lending Certificates
