= Grama Vidiyal =

Indian microfinance company

IDFC Bharat Ltd
- Company type: NBFC
- Industry: Finance
- Founded: 1993
- Headquarters: Tiruchirapalli, India
- Number of locations: 298
- Area served: Tamil Nadu, India
- Key people: S. Devaraj, chairman and managing director Arjun Muralidharan, CEO; Shirley Devaraj, COO
- Products: microfinance microinsurance networking and federation
- Operating income: 220
- Total assets: 2.29. INR (2018)
- Number of employees: 2242
- Website: http://www.gvmfl.com/

IDFC Bharat Ltd is a microfinance company (formerly known as Grama Vidiyal), operating in the Tamil Nadu area of South India. Since 1993, it has provided small loans to women without access to formal credit and who typically have daily incomes of less than INR 80 (US$2) per day.

== History ==
In 2007, Grama Vidiyal transformed from a charitable trust to a regulated Non-Bank Financial Company (NBFC). Its status as an NBFC brings Grama Vidiyal under the purview of government regulation but will permit the firm to take on larger amounts of equity capital. Grama Vidiyal expects continued rapid growth, reaching more than two million clients by expanding to other states of India with an excess of Rs.15 billion (US$400,000,000) in loans outstanding by 2012.

== Loan products ==
Grama Vidiyal offers a variety of loans to its members.

== Other services ==
Grama Vidiyal is among the largest microinsurance providers in India, and was studied by the ILO for a 2005 case study on microinsurance

== Investors ==
Some of the most prominent investors include Vinod Khosla, co-founder of Sun Microsystems and former partner in the venture capital firm Kleiner Perkins. Additional investment has come from the Unitus Equity Fund, a $23.6 million fund which invests in emerging microfinance institutions. In 2016, Grama Vidiyal was acquired by IDFC First Bank Ltd (formerly known as IDFC Bank Ltd) and name was changed to IDFC Bharat Ltd from Grama Vidiyal.

== See also ==
- Grameen Bank
