= Capital First Ltd. =

Indian financial institution

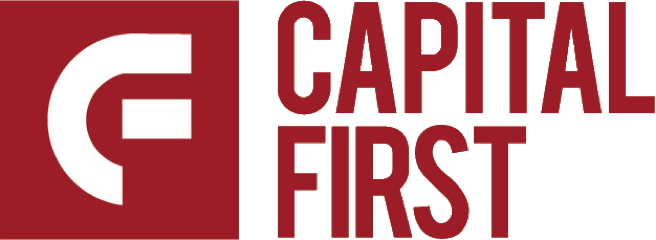
- Formerly: Future Capital Holdings
- Company type: Public
- Traded as: BSE: 532938; NSE: CAPF
- ISIN: INE688I01017
- Industry: Non-bank financial institution
- Founded: 2005
- Defunct: 18 December 2018
- Fate: Merged with IDFC Bank to form IDFC First Bank
- Successor: IDFC First Bank
- Headquarters: One Indiabulls Centre, Senapati Bapat Marg, Lower Parel (West), Mumbai, Maharashtra, India
- Area served: India
- Key people: V. Vaidyanathan (Chairman & MD); Pankaj Sanklecha (CFO)
- Revenue: ▲₹3,628 crore (US$530.49 million) (2018)
- Operating income: ▲₹454 crore (US$66.38 million) (2018)
- Net income: ▲₹327 crore (US$47.81 million) (2018)
- AUM: ▲₹26,997 crore (US$3.95 billion) (2018)
- Total assets: ▲₹23,981 crore (US$3.51 billion) (2018)
- Total equity: ▲₹2,549 crore (US$372.72 million) (2018)
- Owners: Cloverdell Investment Ltd (34.29%); Government of Singapore (9.0%)
- Subsidiaries: Capital First Home Finance Limited; Capital First Securities Limited; Capital First Commodities Limited
- Rating: AAA
- Website: www.capitalfirst.com

Capital First Ltd, formerly known as Future Capital Holdings, was an Indian non-bank financial institution which provided debt financing. In December 2018, it was merged into IDFC Bank to form IDFC First Bank. The company was listed on the NSE and BSE prior to the merger.

== History ==
Founded in 2005 as a part of Future Group, the company became Future Capital Holdings in December 2006. The company listed on the Indian stock exchanges in January 2008 following an initial public offering. Between 2008 and 2010, the company launched businesses including real estate development financing, corporate credit, private equity, asset management, foreign exchange, retail broking, mall management, wealth management and property services.

In 2010, V. Vaidyanathan, then MD and CEO of ICICI Prudential Life, was appointed as the vice-chairman and MD of Future Capital Holdings. Vaidyanathan obtained a 10% stake in the company as part of the deal. The company later exited legacy businesses of forex, wealth, and broking, and reduced wholesale lending sharply.

In 2012, Warburg Pincus agreed to buy a majority stake in the company for ₹8.10 billion (US$151.58 million), including ₹1 billion by way of preferential allotment. An open offer was made to the public in line with SEBI guidelines. The board was reconstituted and the company was renamed Capital First.

On 13 January 2018, IDFC Bank and Capital First announced a merger in a stock swap deal, with IDFC Bank issuing 139 shares of the bank for every 10 shares of Capital First. The merger completed in December 2018 and Vaidyanathan took over as the MD and CEO of the bank which was renamed IDFC First Bank.
