= Capital Small Finance Bank =

Indian small finance bank

Capital Small Finance Bank Limited
- Type: Public
- Traded as: NSE: CAPITALSFB; BSE: 544120
- ISIN: INE646H01017
- Industry: Financial services
- Predecessor: Capital Local Area Bank
- Founded: 2000; 26 years ago, licensed in 2016
- Headquarters: Jalandhar, India
- Area served: India
- Key people: Madan Gopal Sharma (Chairman); Sarvjit Singh Samra (managing director & CEO) Munish Jain (CFO)
- Website: www.capital.bank.in

Capital Small Finance Bank (formerly Capital Local Area Bank) is an Indian small finance bank founded in April 2016, headquartered in Jalandhar, India.

== History ==
Founded in 2000, Capital Local Area Bank was primarily operational in some districts of Punjab, including Jalandhar, Kapurthala, and Hoshiarpur until 2013. After 2013, the bank expanded its operations in Ludhiana and Amritsar. As of June 2016, the bank was operating through its 76 branches.

After providing in principle approval in September 2016, RBI granted the license to Capital Local Area Bank under Section 22(1) of the Banking Regulation Act, 1949 in 2016 and it started to operate from 24 April 2016 under the new brand name of Capital Small Finance Bank as the first Small finance bank of India. On the foundation day, Capital Small Finance Bank opened 10 new branches to the existing 49 branches of Capital Local Area Bank. As of March 2021, the bank has a total of 158 operational branches.

In June 2019, the bank raised ₹430 crore in fund from Amicus Capital followed by 84 Crore in November by Oman India Joint Investment Fund bought 10% share of the bank.

In June 2022, Capital Small Finance Bank paid ₹5.8 lakh to the Securities and Exchange Board of India (SEBI) to settle a case regarding alleged non-compliance with regulatory norms.

In 2024, Capital Small Finance Bank listed its shares on the NSE and BSE while achieving a net profit exceeding ₹100 crore.

== See also ==
- List of banks in India
- Reserve Bank of India
- Small finance bank
