= Haryana Government accounts fraud =

Financial fraud in India

The Haryana Government accounts fraud (also known as Haryana Government multi-bank accounts fraud or Haryana Government funds misappropriation case) is a series of financial irregularities of approximately ₹950 crore (US$99 million) that was uncovered in February 2026 at the Chandigarh branches of IDFC First Bank, AU Small Finance Bank, and Kotak Mahindra Bank, primarily affecting bank accounts linked to departments, boards, and entities of the Government of Haryana under schemes such as Mukhya Mantri Grameen Awas Yojna 2.0. The discrepancies were found when unauthorised transactions were detected, raising suspicions that some bank employees may have been involved with outsiders. Following this, the state government passed a mandate to remove private banks from its list of banks authorised to handle state government business.

After taking over the case in April 2026, the Central Bureau of Investigation (CBI) investigated the case which involved fake fixed deposits, forged debit notes, altered bank records, and fund transfers through shell companies. By early-September 2026, the CBI had filed chargesheets against at least 37 people in the case, including bank officials, government employees, companies, and private individuals. It also arrested several senior bureaucrats and bank executives during the investigation.

== Background ==
The alleged fraud surfaced when a Haryana government department requested the closure of an account at IDFC First Bank's Chandigarh branch and the transfer of its balance to another bank. Reconciliation revealed a mismatch between the department's reported balance and the funds available in the bank's records. Further internal checks found problems in a particular group of Haryana government-linked accounts. At the time of its discovery, the total amount being reviewed is on or about ₹590 crore (US$61 million), which includes an earlier shortfall of ₹490 crore (US$51 million) and another ₹100 crore (US$10 million) found later through internal audits. The bank reported this issue to regulators on 22 February 2026.

=== Involvement of IDFC First Bank staff ===
IDFC First Bank's internal investigation found that some employees at its Sector 32 branch in Chandigarh may have been involved with outsiders in multiple forged cheque transactions. The bank suspended those officials, filed a police complaint, and informed the Reserve Bank of India. The fraud involved suspicious payment instructions processed by bank staff despite signs of forgery. The money was then transferred to external parties, with the help of bank employees using physical cheques.

A CBI statement dated 14 May 2026, Anish Kapur, the bank’s Regional Head of Government Banking, raised concerns about unauthorised interest rates and suspicious government fund transfers at the Sector 32 branch in March 2025 and called for an immediate audit. ThePrint reported that an internal investigation later confirmed the allegations, which led to firing of two employees in June and August 2025.

=== Involvement of AU Small Finance Bank staff ===
AU Small Finance Bank was de-empanelled by the Haryana government as it was identified as the intermediary bank that received the funds. The state had queried the bank regarding suspected unauthorised transactions totaling approximately ₹72 crore (US$7.5 million), out of which ₹47 crore (US$4.9 million) was transferred from a government account to a customer account in 14 transactions. The bank clarified that these were conducted in the normal course of business with proper authorisation, and denied any wrongdoing or fraud on its part. It also stated that it had closed one relevant government account in January 2026 according to departmental instructions and an initial credit of ₹25 crore (US$2.6 million) plus interest was remitted to the original bank.

=== Involvement of Kotak Mahindra Bank staff ===
On 25 March 2026,the Panchkula Municipal Corporation discovered ₹150 crore (US$16 million) shortfall in its fixed deposit at Kotak Mahindra Bank's Sector-11 branch. It was discovered when municipal officials instructed the bank to transfer funds from a maturing fixed deposit; reconciliation revealed that ₹150 crore (US$16 million) including one ₹58 crore (US$6.0 million) crore fixed deposits did not exist.

The bank confirmed the shortfall, and filed an FIR at Panchkula police station. Haryana Chief Secretary Anurag Rastogi directed the Haryana State Vigilance and Anti-Corruption Bureau (SV&ACB) to investigate.

== Investigation ==
=== Committee findings ===
A three-member committee of Haryana's Development and Panchayats Department found that two bank accounts were opened on 26 September 2025 under the Mukhya Mantri Grameen Awas Yojna 2.0 scheme; one with IDFC First Bank and one with AU Small Finance Bank at their Sector 32 branches in Chandigarh. As instructed by the state finance department, ₹50 crore (US$5.2 million) was placed in the IDFC First Bank account and ₹25 crore (US$2.6 million) in the AU Small Finance Bank account. No authority ever approved the use of this money; it was supposed to remain untouched. The suspected fraud came to light in January 2026, when the finance department asked both banks to close the accounts and transfer the full amounts to an Axis Bank account.

AU Small Finance Bank transferred the full amount and closed the account, but at IDFC First Bank, alleged actions by now-arrested employees resulted in only a partial transfer before the account was closed. When government officials checked transaction records, they found that several cheques and debit notes had been used to move money from the IDFC account. These documents appeared to carry forged signatures of a senior Indian Administrative Service officer, Dusmanta Kumar Behera. The department stated that it does not use cheques for this scheme, only debit notes. In total, over ₹46 crore (US$4.8 million) was transferred from IDFC First Bank to AU Small Finance Bank using these questionable instruments.

The committee also found that transaction alerts were being sent to a mobile number registered to a superintendent in the Panchayats Department, and his statement was recorded. AU Small Finance Bank was described as non-cooperative, and its records showed payments to an unknown entity named Swastik Desh Projects. IDFC First Bank records also showed unexplained transactions involving other government bodies, raising fears that more accounts may be affected. The committee concluded that the case involves forgery and serious procedural lapses by officials of both banks and recommended a full investigation by the state police.

=== Police investigation ===
According to police press briefing on 25 February 2026, the fraud was allegedly led by former IDFC First Bank manager Ribhav Rishi. He headed the bank's Sector 32 branch in Chandigarh until about six months earlier and left around August-September 2025. At the time of his arrest, he was working with AU Small Finance Bank in Chandigarh. Police say he colluded with former relationship manager Abhay Kumar, who had resigned in August 2025.

Together, they handled forged cheques and debit notes with mismatched amounts and forged signatures of Behera. About ₹46.56 crore (US$4.8 million) was initially traced and but overall siphoning estimated between ₹300 crore (US$31 million) and ₹590 crore (US$61 million). Some of the money was reportedly sent to private companies, including Swastik Desh Projects (the owners were not identified in the committee investigation), which is said to be owned by Rishi's wife, Swati Singla, and her brother, Abhishek Singla. All four were arrested on the night of 24 February 2026.

Further investigation by Haryana's SV&ACB identified 52-year-old local real estate businessman Vikram Wadhwa as the main accused in the scam. According to investigators, Wadhwa used his connections with senior government officials to persuade several Haryana departments including the School Shiksha Pariyojna Parishad, State Pollution Control Board, Power Generation Corporation, Development and Panchayats Department, and Panchkula Municipal Corporation to place public funds as fixed deposits in a private bank. The money was later diverted through shell companies such as Swastik Desh Project. Approximately ₹100 crore (US$10 million) was reportedly used to buy gold through jewellers, while about ₹10 crore (US$1.0 million) was transferred to relatives and associates before being withdrawn as cash. Wadhwa, who reportedly owns properties worth over ₹100 crore in Chandigarh along with a luxury farmhouse and expensive vehicles, went into hiding after the scam came to light, prompting authorities to issue a look out circular against him. On 28 February 2026, Mohali businessman Manish Jindal was arrested for his alleged involvement in the conspiracy.

On 11 March 2026, the Enforcement Directorate (ED) raided 19 locations in and around Chandigarh, Haryana, and the National Capital Region to track the flow of money. This led to arrest of Rajan Katodia on 14 March 2026, the owner of Chandigarh-based Sawan Jewellers, who allegedly received an amount exceeding ₹250 crore (US$26 million) from various firms linked to the accused, including Vikram Wadhwa et al. On 16 March 2026, the two Haryana government officials, Rajesh Sangwan and Randhir Singh, who were posted as Finance and Accounts Controllers at the Haryana State Agricultural Marketing Board and the Haryana School Shiksha Pariyojna Parishad. They are accused of colluding with Katodia to divert government funds and of taking large amounts of money as illegal payments.

Parallelly, the Haryana SV&ACB arrested Kotak Mahindra Bank's relationship manager Dileep Kumar Raghav on the night of 25 March 2026. Raghav was allegedly involved in sending fake reports regarding fixed deposits to the Panchkula Municipal Corporation. Later, he was produced before a local court in Panchkula on 26 March 2026 and remanded to four-day police custody on charges of cheating, forgery, criminal breach of trust, and under the Prevention of Corruption Act.

On 18 March 2026, the Haryana SV&ACB arrested Amit Dewan, Director of the Haryana Power Generation Corporation Limited (HPGCL). Investigators claimed Dewan colluded with Ribhav Rishi to open unauthorised bank accounts with IDFC First Bank and AU Small Finance Bank, bypassed government procedures for fund transfers which involved approximately ₹100 crore from HPGCL, and in return accepted a kickback of around ₹50 lakh. He was later remanded to CBI custody along with other officials. On 4 May 2026 (order issued 1 May), the Haryana government dismissed Dewan from service without a departmental inquiry.

On 8 April 2026, Kotak Mahindra Bank's Deputy Vice-President Pushpender Singh surrendered to police in connection with the linked ₹150 crore Panchkula Municipal Corporation fixed-deposit fraud; he was arrested the same day and remanded to five days' police custody by a Panchkula court the following day.

On 9 April 2026, Haryana Chief Secretary Rastogi suspended two IAS officers: Pardeep Kumar of 2011 batch, Director of Haryana Transport Department and Ram Kumar Singh of 2012 batch, Special Secretary in Revenue and Disaster Management Department and former Municipal Commissioner of Panchkula in connection with alleged irregularities and collusion in the diversion of government funds. The suspensions were issued under the All India Services (Discipline & Appeal) Rules, 1969. The same day, the Haryana government handed over the entire investigation to the Central Bureau of Investigation.

=== CBI investigation and chargesheets ===
After the CBI took over the investigation on 9 April 2026, it registered cases under the Prevention of Corruption Act and the Bharatiya Nyaya Sanhita for offences including criminal conspiracy, cheating, forgery, and criminal breach of trust.

==== First chargesheet ====
In May 2026, the CBI filed its first chargesheet in the Haryana case against 15 accused, including six bank officials from IDFC First Bank and AU Small Finance Bank, three Haryana government officials, two companies, and several private individuals. A second chargesheet, filed in June 2026, named more accused, including real estate businessman Vikram Wadhwa and jeweller Rajan Katodia, bringing the total number of chargesheeted people in the Haryana case to 17.

According to the CBI, the fraud involved opening bank accounts without proper approval, changing authorised contact details to hide transaction alerts, using fake documents and non-existent fixed deposits, and moving money through shell companies before converting it into assets such as gold. Also, the CBI took over related cases involving Chandigarh Smart City Limited, the Municipal Corporation Chandigarh, and CREST Chandigarh.

==== Second chargesheet ====
In June 2026, the CBI arrested former Panchkula Municipal Commissioner Ram Kumar Singh. It also arrested IAS officer Pankaj Aggarwal, accusing him of helping open unauthorised bank accounts that led to an estimated loss of about ₹60.54 crore from HSSPP and Haryana State Agriculture Marketing Board accounts. The Haryana government later suspended him.

Later that month, the CBI arrested IAS officer Pardeep Kumar in connection with an alleged loss of about ₹169 crore, the largest reported loss in the case. Former IDFC First Bank official Shamim Dar, former AU Small Finance Bank branch manager Charanjeet Singh Randhawa, and a data entry operator linked to HSPCB investments were also arrested. In early July 2026, a special CBI court in Panchkula rejected the bail applications of some of the accused.

In parallel, the Enforcement Directorate continued its separate money laundering investigation. As part of that probe, it arrested Vikram Wadhwa and alleged that some of the stolen money was converted into cash through jewellers and used to buy assets.

==== Third chargesheet ====
On 2 September 2026, the CBI filed its third chargesheet in the Special CBI Court in Panchkula against 19 more accused. It included six Haryana-cadre IAS officers, three officials from IDFC First Bank, one official from AU Small Finance Bank, and nine Haryana government officials. The chargesheet listed offences such as criminal conspiracy, cheating, forgery, destruction of evidence, falsification of accounts, criminal breach of trust, and violations of the Prevention of Corruption Act, 1988. This brought the total number of accused chargesheeted in the case to 37.

== Response ==
On 18 February 2026, the Haryana government issued a circular and subsequently further instructions around 22 February, directing all departments, boards, corporations, PSUs, and autonomous bodies to immediately close their accounts with both banks. They were asked to move their money to other banks and to take prior approval from the Finance Department before opening any new private bank accounts.

On 23 February 2026, the Haryana's ACB filed a first information report based on the inquiry report prepared by a committee of Haryana's Development and Panchayats Department against employees of IDFC First Bank and AU Small Finance Bank, as well as unknown government officials, to investigate their suspected role in irregularities in unauthorised fund movements in two Haryana government accounts opened with IDFC First Bank and AU Small Finance Bank under the Mukhya Mantri Grameen Awas Yojna 2.0 scheme, at branches located in Sector 32, Chandigarh.

As of 24 February 2026, IDFC First Bank had replenished ₹578 crore (US$60 million) crore to the accounts of the state's departments, which includes ₹556 crore (US$58 million) as deposits and ₹22 crore (US$2.3 million) returned as interest, as confirmed by Chief Minister of Haryana Nayab Singh Saini during a session of the Haryana Legislative Assembly. Also, the bank appointed KPMG for the forensic audit and convened its Special Committee for Monitoring Frauds, Audit Committee, and Board of Directors. A police complaint was filed, with potential additional complaints planned.

As of 24 February 2026, AU Small Finance Bank denied any role in the fraud after the state government removed it from its empanelled list on 18 February 2026. The bank started an internal investigation and placed certain employees on administrative leave pending the review.

In June 2026, the Union Finance Ministry ordered public sector banks to strengthen checks on government accounts and verify contact details in their records following the Haryana fraud case.
