= Suryoday Small Finance Bank =

Indian small finance bank

- Type: Public
- Traded as: NSE: SURYODAY; BSE: 543279
- Industry: Banking
- Predecessor: Suryoday Micro Finance Limited
- Founded: 2008
- Headquarters: Navi Mumbai, Maharashtra, India
- Key people: Baskar Babu Ramachandran (MD & CEO)
- Products: Banking, loans, deposits and financial services
- Website: suryoday.bank.in

Suryoday Small Finance Bank Limited is an Indian small finance bank headquartered in Navi Mumbai, Maharashtra.

== History ==
Suryoday was incorporated on 10 November 2008 as Suryoday Micro Finance Private Limited. The company initially operated as a microfinance institution. It subsequently became a public limited company in 2015 and changed its name to Suryoday Micro Finance Limited.

In September 2015, Suryoday received in-principle approval from the Reserve Bank of India to establish a small finance bank. The RBI subsequently granted the final approval for its conversion into a small finance bank in 2016. The bank commenced operations as a small finance bank on 23 January 2017.

== Listing ==
Suryoday Small Finance Bank became a publicly listed company in March 2021. Its equity shares were listed on the National Stock Exchange of India and BSE Limited on 26 March 2021. The public issue raised approximately ₹5,810 million (US$60 million), including approximately ₹2,480 million (US$26 million) of primary capital.
