= Shivalik Small Finance Bank =

Indian small finance bank

- Type: Public
- Industry: Banking and financial services
- Predecessor: Shivalik Mercantile Co-operative Bank
- Founded: 1998; 28 years ago
- Founder: Yashvir Kumar Gupta
- Headquarters: Jasola Vihar, New Delhi, India
- Area served: India
- Products: Banking services, loans, deposits and digital banking
- Website: shivalik.bank.in

Shivalik Small Finance Bank (SSFB) is an Indian small finance bank headquartered in Jasola, New Delhi. It was formed from Shivalik Mercantile Co-operative Bank. Shivalik was the first urban co-operative bank in India to convert into a small finance bank.

== History ==
=== Shivalik Mercantile Co-operative Bank ===
Shivalik Mercantile Co-operative Bank was established in 1998 by Yashvir Kumar Gupta. It operated as an urban co-operative bank before applying to the Reserve Bank of India (RBI) to convert into a small finance bank.

=== Small finance bank ===
In January 2021, the RBI granted Shivalik a licence to carry on banking business as a small finance bank.

Shivalik Small Finance Bank began operations on 26 April 2021. It became the first urban co-operative bank in India to commence operations as a small finance bank following conversion from its previous banking structure.
