= Bankchain =

BankChain was an Indian platform and initiative for banks to implement blockchain software that was launched in 2017. A majority of the major banks in India were members and the platform was designed for systems that shared data between its members.

== History ==
BankChain was announced on 8 February 2017 by State Bank of India (SBI), India's largest bank. BankChain members included the State Bank of India, ICICI Bank, DCB Bank, Kotak Mahindra Bank, Federal Bank, Deutsche Bank and UAE Exchange. BankChain was formed in collaboration with Primechain Technologies, a Pune-based startup.

== Projects ==
As of 2017, the active projects included shared KYC / AML, syndication of loans / consortium lending, trade finance, asset registry & asset re-hypothecation, secure documents, cross border payments, peer-to-peer payments, and blockchain security controls.
