= Samit Ghosh =

Founder of Ujjivan Financial Services Limited

- Born: 1949 (age 76–77); Dhanbad, India
- Education: Wharton School (MBA)
- Title: Founder of Ujjivan Small Finance Bank

Samit Ghosh is an Indian business executive, who founded Ujjivan Financial Services Limited, and was its managing director and chief executive officer until 31 January 2017, when he accepted an equivalent role with subsidiary Ujjivan Small Finance Bank. He was CEO of Ujjivan Financial Services until 2017, and now its non-executive chairman.

== Early life and education ==
Samit Ghosh was born in 1949 to Dr. Sailendra Kumar. Ghosh spent a large part of his early years in Dhanbad. His father was a doctor who served the Indian Army during World War II and set up a number of government hospitals in the poor coal mining areas near Dhanbad. He lost his father at age of 10. His mother was a professor in Sri Shikshyatan College. Ghosh completed his undergraduate in economics from St. Xavier's College in Kolkata and Master of Business Administration in finance from The Wharton School of Business at the University of Pennsylvania, United States.

== Career ==
Ghosh started his career with Citibank in 1975. From 1980 to 1985, he worked as the vice president for investment and corporate banking at Arab Bank in Bahrain. He returned to India in 1985 to rejoin Citibank and was part of the management team which launched retail banking in 1985. He was the vice-president of Citibank between 1975-1980 and again between 1985 and 1993. From 1993 to 1996, he was regional head of personal banking for South Asia and the Middle East at Standard Chartered Bank in Dubai. He later became the CEO of Bank Muscat.

In November 2005, he founded Ujjivan Financial Services in Bengaluru as a non-deposit taking, non-banking financial company (NBFC), primarily operating in the microfinance sector. In 2013, Ujjivan obtained registration with the Reserve Bank of India (RBI) as a non-banking financial company - microfinance institution (NBFC-MFI). From February 1, 2017, he held the position of MD & CEO at Ujjivan Small Finance Bank until his retirement on November 30, 2019. Ghosh is a Non-Executive, Non-Independent Director at Ujjivan Small Finance Bank.

== Other roles ==
He has been the president of Microfinance Institutions Network (MFIN) and chairman of Association of Karnataka Microfinance Institutions (AKMI). Since April 2020, he has been a CSI Partner at the Nudge Centre for Social Innovation, and as a Non-Executive Director at Parinaam Foundation since September 2020.
