= Sasfin Bank =

South African bank

- Type: Private
- Industry: Financial services
- Founded: 1951; 75 years ago
- Headquarters: Johannesburg, South Africa; Hong Kong
- Key people: Michael Sassoon (CEO)
- Products: Loans, savings, checking, investments, debit cards, and credit cards
- Website: sasfin.com

Sasfin, officially Sasfin Holdings Limited, is a South African based bank-controlling company that listed on the Johannesburg Stock Exchange (JSE) in 1987.

Sasfin and its subsidiaries, notably Sasfin Bank Limited, provide financial products and services for business and wealth clients. Sasfin is currently led by CEO Michael Sassoon, and is headquartered in Johannesburg, South Africa. It has several regional offices, as well as an office in Hong Kong.

== History ==
Sasfin was founded in 1951, and for several decades, its target market was the entrepreneur and small and medium enterprises.

Following the granting of Sasfin's banking licence in 1999 and the acquisition of stockbroking firm Frankel Pollak (with a legacy dating back to 1890) in 2000, Sasfin's target was expanded to include high-net-worth individuals and corporates.

== Controversy ==
In 2022, South African media outlet the Daily Maverick reported that the South African Revenue Service (SARS) had found evidence that Sasfin employees had helped facilitate the laundering and illegal transfer of R3 billion (US$172 million) out of South Africa on behalf of Gold Leaf Tobacco Corporation (GLTC) in 2017. GLTC had allegedly made the money from the illicit sale of tobacco products in South Africa. Sasfin CEO Michael Sassoon stated that "Sasfin commits fully to cooperating with the authorities to ensure that justice prevails and will take rigorous action against any employees who may be identified as having participated in misconduct," closed its account with GLTC and suspended two employees.
