= Jana Small Finance Bank =

Small finance bank in India

- Type: Public
- Traded as: NSE: JSFB; BSE: 544118
- Industry: Small finance bank
- Founded: 2018
- Headquarters: Bangalore, Karnataka, India
- Key people: Ajay Kanwal (CEO)
- Services: Banking, financial services
- Website: www.jana.bank.in

Jana Small Finance Bank is a small finance bank headquartered in Bangalore. It commenced banking operations on 28 March 2018 and is the fourth-largest small finance bank in India by asset size.

As of March 2026, the bank operates a physical network of more than 820 banking outlets spread across 23 states and two union territories in India.

== History ==
Prior to becoming a bank, the company was India's largest microfinance institution, Janalakshmi Financial Services, founded July 24, 2006. In 2018, the Reserve Bank of India issued a banking license to the company under Section 22 (1) of the Banking Regulation Act, 1949.

As a microfinance lender, the company survived large losses following the 2016 Indian banknote demonetisation, reporting total losses of ₹2,504 crore (US$338 million) at the time of its conversion to a small finance bank. The September 2019 quarter was its first profitable quarter since demonetisation.

In October 2019, Jana Small Finance Bank raised ₹225 crore in equity capital from existing investors, Jana Holding Limited, TPG Capital and Harbour Partners, which increased its Capital Adequacy Ratio to 19.97%. Following the equity round, total capital raised by the bank since April 2017 reached ₹2947 crore.

In May 2026, TVS Venu agreed to acquire a minority stake up to 9.9% in Jana Small Finance Bank through a combination of primary issuance of warrants and secondary share purchases.

== See also ==
- Banking in India
- List of banks in India
- Indian Financial System Code
