= Punjab and Maharashtra Co-operative Bank =

Co-operative Bank in India

- Company type: Cooperative bank
- Industry: Banking; Financial services
- Founded: 1984; 42 years ago
- Defunct: 25 January 2022; 4 years ago
- Fate: Merged with Unity Small Finance Bank
- Successor: Unity Small Finance Bank
- Headquarters: Mumbai, India
- Number of locations: 137 branch banks (2019)
- Area served: Maharashtra; Goa; Karnataka; Delhi; Gujarat; Madhya Pradesh
- Website: pmcbank.com

Punjab & Maharashtra Co-operative Bank Limited (PMC), was a multi-state co-operative bank that began operations in 1983. It had 137 branches spread over half a dozen states of India and nearly 100 branches were in Maharashtra. It was regulated by the Reserve Bank of India and registered under the Cooperative Societies Act.

It also has branches in Karnataka, Goa, Delhi, Madhya Pradesh and Gujarat. It was among the profitable co-operative banks in India and had earned a total revenue of ₹1,297 crore (US$135 million) and profits of ₹99.69 crore (US$10 million) in the financial year 2019.

On 23 September 2019, the RBI imposed operational and transactional restrictions on PMC Bank for six months. Due to this, the bank account holders were not allowed to withdraw more than ₹1,000 from their accounts during this period of restrictions. On 26 September 2019, the restrictions have been eased and a total of ₹10,000 could be withdrawn by customers. On 5 November, 2019 decided to increase the prescribed withdrawal limit to ₹ 50,000.

The Reserve Bank of India (RBI) on 19 June 2020 doubled the withdrawal limit for Punjab and Maharashtra Cooperative Bank's depositors to Rs 100,000 from Rs 50,000 earlier.

Joy Thomas (aka Junaid Khan), the MD of the bank, was suspended. He admitted the exposure of the bank to the troubled realty company Housing Development and Infrastructure Limited (HDIL) and also stated that the company had been violating the RBI rules for 5–6 years now. Of the overall loan book of ₹8,300 crores, PMC bank loans to HDIL stood at ₹6,226 crore, about 73% of total loans of the bank.

To solve this, HC appointed the three-member committee to oversee the sale of assets of Housing Development Infrastructure (HDIL) to pay the depositors of Punjab and Maharashtra Co-operative Bank (PMC Bank). HDIL, its promoters Rakesh and Sarang Wadhawan, and a few former officials are accused of committing a fraud on PMC Bank.[8] Public interest litigation filed in the high court, seeking the setting up of a committee to speed up the auction of HDIL's assets to pay depositors, has claimed that the realty firm owed ₹4,635 crore to the bank. The court said if the proceeds from the sale were insufficient to pay the dues, the committee would identify and dispose of the properties of other companies owned or promoted by the Wadhawans which were mortgaged with the PMC Bank, but with paripassu charge of other financial
Due to the restrictions and not providing any solution to the account holders and share holders of PMC Bank there is a loss of trust amongst the people of India towards the failed banking System, towards the Reserve Bank of India and towards the Government of India[9]

As per an official circular from RBI on 25 January 2022, Punjab and Maharashtra Cooperative Bank merged with Unity Small Finance Bank Ltd. and all the branches of PMC Bank will function as branches of Unity Small Finance Bank Ltd.

== See also ==
- Co-operative banking
- List of banks in India
