= SBM Bank India =

Commercial bank

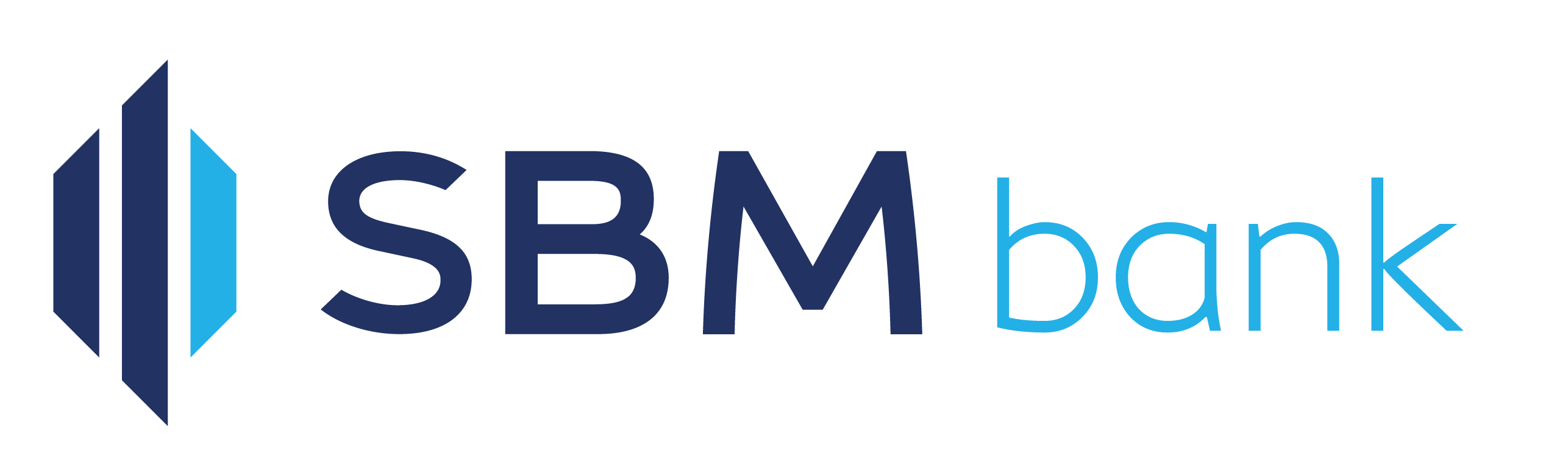
- Type: Public
- Industry: Finance and Insurance
- Founded: 1 December 2018
- Headquarters: Mumbai, India
- Key people: Ashish Vijayakar (MD and CEO)
- Products: Banking
- Number of employees: 350+
- Parent: SBM Holdings Ltd
- Website: www.sbm.bank.in

SBM Bank India is a subsidiary of the State Bank of Mauritius. It was the first bank to receive a banking license from the India's banking regulator Reserve Bank of India (RBI) to establish a universal banking business in the country as a wholly owned subsidiary. It was incorporated on 1 December 2018 as a private sector bank headquartered in Mumbai. It also operates from New Delhi, Mumbai, Bengaluru, Chennai, Hyderabad, Ahmedabad, Kolkata, Chandigarh, Ludhiana, Surat, and in the rural centers of Ramachandrapuram and Palghar.

== History ==
SBM Bank (India) Ltd. is a step-down subsidiary of SBM Holdings Ltd, a listed entity in the Mauritius Stock exchange, promoted by the Government of Mauritius, brought its rich experience to India by setting up the Indian Operations in 1994.

== Products and services ==
SBM Bank (India) Ltd. focuses on retail banking products under the brand "SBM Private Wealth" and customized wholesale banking products.

== Tie-ups and Partnerships ==
- SBM Bank taps partnerships to grow India operations.
- SBM Bank India partners with Lendingkart to offer overdraft facility for working capital to MSMEs. SBM Bank offers a customised overdraft facility to over 1,00,000 customers of Lendingkart, largely MSMEs.
- SBM Bank India to empower for MSME exporters through collaboration with Drip Capital.
- SBM Bank India re-imagines credit card experience in partnership with OneCard. SBM Bank India did the Collaboration with OneCard to extend mobile-based credit cards. With in-app on-boarding, the virtual card can be activated & used instantly, while the physical card is delivered to the customer in as less as 3–5 days time.
- SBM Bank India tied up with CredAvenue for NBFCs and fintec.
- SBM Bank India taps 30 fintechs to grow deposit operations.
- Vested Finance and SBM Bank come together to offer forex transfers.
- Paisabazaar introduces its neo-lending strategy, launches Step Up Credit Card with SBM Bank India.
- Niyo and SBM Bank India come together to offer Niyo Global experience for passport holders.
- Niyo with SBM Bank India and VISA now offers a digital savings account with travel-friendly product Niyo Global. Along with zero-forex mark-up, customers can now earn an attractive interest p.a. on the savings account.
- U GRO Capital and SBM Bank India together launch ‘GRO Smart Business’ credit cards targeted to MSMEs.
- SBM Bank India along with Mastercard facilitate cross border transactions, remittances.
- LoanTap in association with SBM Bank and Rupay, launches limitless prepaid cards.
- SBM EnKash RuPay Business Card through RuPay network will offer a host of unique amenities designed for SMEs, MSMEs, and start-ups.
- SBM Bank India taps Vakrangee for Banking Business Correspondent (BC) service.
- Finin collaborates with SBM Bank India.
- Arya announces its collaboration with SBM Bank India to tap the mid-market segment, including mid-corporates and higher-end SMEs.
- Vakrangee partners with SBM Bank India to take Smart Banking to Indian hinterlands.
- Bharti AXA Life tied up with SBM Bank India for insurance distribution.
- SBM Bank India and PayNearby come together to democratize financial investments.
