= Tamal Bandyopadhyay =

Indian business journalist

- Born: 18 March 1961 (age 65); Midnapur, West Bengal, India
- Education: University of Calcutta
- Occupations: Journalist, writer, columnist
- Notable credit: Banker's Trust
- Spouse: Rita Bandyopadhyay
- Children: Sujan Bandyopadhyay

Tamal Bandyopadhyay is an Indian business journalist, known for his weekly column on banking and finance Banker's Trust published in Business Standard, a leading Indian business daily. He had started this column in Mint, an Indian business daily by HT Media Ltd.

He has authored seven books namely HDFC Bank 2.0: From Dawn to Digital, From Lehman to Demonetization: A Decade of Disruptions, Reforms and Misadventures, Bandhan: The Making of a Bank, Sahara: The Untold Story and A Bank for the Buck, Pandemonium: The Great Indian Banking Tragedy, Roller Coaster: An Affair with Banking. Bandhan: The Making of a Bank has been translated into Bengali.

== Life and career ==
A student of English literature (a postgraduate from Calcutta University), Tamal Bandyopadhyay began his career in journalism as a trainee journalist with Times of India, in Mumbai in 1985. Subsequently, he has worked with four national financial dailies: The Economic Times, Financial Express, Business Standard, and as a member of the founding team of Mint in February 2007, going on to serve as its deputy managing editor and later as a consulting editor till September 2018. Currently he is a consulting editor of Business Standard, a business daily where he served as deputy resident editor in Mumbai before joining Mint.

He is also a senior adviser to Jana Small Finance Bank Before this stint, he was an adviser at Bandhan Bank from August 2014.

Bandyopadhyay has been writing his weekly column Banker's Trust since February 2007. Between April and November 2011, he ran a 32-episode series on Bloomberg India TV, also called Banker's Trust, where senior central bankers, commercial bankers, and economists were interviewed every week.

== Bibliography ==
- A Bank for the Buck. Jaico Publishing House. 2013. ISBN 9788184953961. OCLC 823821380.
- Anupam Meenrashi (2014)
- Sahara The Untold Story. Ahmedabad: Jaico Publishing House. 2014. ISBN 9788184955460. OCLC 883179164.
- )Bandhan The Making of a Bank. Penguin Books Limited. 9 June 2016. ISBN 9789386057204.
- From Lehman to Demonetization. Penguin Random House India Private Limited. 23 November 2017. ISBN 9789387326392. OCLC 1017756529.
- HDFC Bank 2.0. Jaico Publishing House. 2019. ISBN 9789388423359.
- Pandemonium: The Great Indian Banking Tragedy. Roli Books. 9 November 2020. ISBN 9788194643364.
- Roller Coaster. Jaico Publishing House. 10 January 2023. ISBN 9789393559586.

(2023)

Bandyopadhyay's second book, Sahara: The Untold Story, details the beginnings and the current day working of the secretive Sahara India Parivar. In December 2013, the Sahara India Pariwar, moved Calcutta High Court, got a stay on the publication of the book and filed a ₹2 billion defamation suit against the author and its publisher, Jaico Publishing House. In April 2014, the parties reached an out of court settlement, following which the book carries a disclaimer by Sahara which says, among other things, the book has "defamatory content".

Tamal Bandyopadhyay is also a contributor to The Oxford Companion to Economics in India and Making of New India: Transformation Under Modi Government.

== Awards and recognition ==
LinkedIn nominated Tamal Bandyopadhyay for three successive years (2015, 2016 and 2017) as one of the top voices in finance. In 2018, he was nominated as one of the top 25 voices in India across sectors.

He is a recipient of Ramnath Goenka Excellence in Journalism Award for commentary and interpretative writing for the year 2016.

In 2021, his book Pandemonium: The Great Indian Banking Tragedy won the Tata Literature Live! Business Book of the Year Award. It also won the Best Business Book Award at the Kalinga Literary Festival and was acknowledged at the Skoch Literature Award 2021.
