= GQG Partners =

Investment management company

GQG Partners Inc.
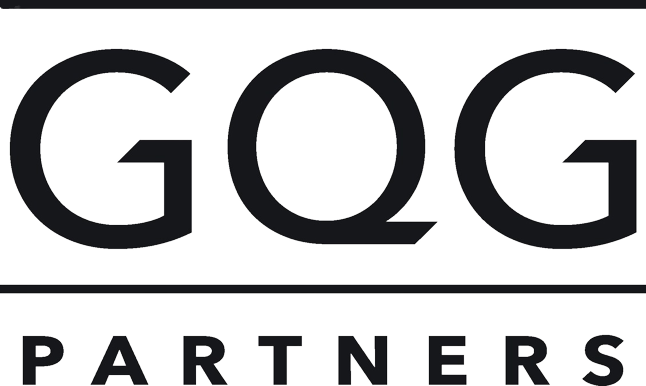
- Company type: Public
- Traded as: ASX: GQG; S&P/ASX 200 component S&P/ASX 300 component
- Industry: Investment management
- Founded: March 2016; 9 years ago
- Founders: Rajiv Jain; Tim Carver
- Headquarters: Fort Lauderdale, Florida, U.S.
- Key people: Rajiv Jain (Chairman & CIO); Tim Carver (CEO)
- Revenue: ▲US$436.83 million (FY 2022)
- Operating income: ▲US$332.14 million (FY 2022)
- Net income: ▼US$237.94 million (FY 2022)
- AUM: US$105 billion (June 2023)
- Total assets: ▼US$341.98 million (FY 2022)
- Total equity: ▲US$312.10 million (FY 2022)
- Number of employees: ▲172 (June 2023)
- Website: www.gqg.com

GQG Partners (GQG; short for Global Quality Growth) is an investment management company headquartered in Fort Lauderdale, Florida. The company focuses on active management of equity portfolios. It is currently traded on the Australian Securities Exchange and is a constituent member of the S&P/ASX 200 index.

Outside the United States, the company has offices in London and Sydney.

== Background ==
GQG was co-founded by Rajiv Jain and Tim Carver in March 2016. Jain who was previously co-CEO and the CIO of Vontobel Asset Management left his position to found GQG and hired Tim Carver as CEO due to his experience in guiding young investment firms. This allowed Jain to focus on the investment side while Carver could focus on the business side. No members of Vontobel's investment team joined Jain when he left and a new investment team had to be formed at GQG.

In December 2016, GQG partnered with Goldman Sachs to launch the Goldman Sachs GQG Partners International Opportunities Fund (international fund) that would invest in equities globally. It is GQG's largest fund at US$26 billion as of March 2023 and has produced an annual return of 10.8% since inception. Two of its largest holdings are British American Tobacco and Philip Morris International.

At the end of 2017, GQG had US$10 billion in assets under management. Its rapid growth in a short period of time was considered unusual for a money manager. At the time 40% of GQG's clients were former Vontobel clients who moved from Vontobel to GQG.

On 28 October 2021, GQG completed its initial public offering (IPO) on the Australian Securities Exchange raising US$893 million.It was the largest IPO in Australia during 2021. However its share price has traded below its offer price since.

As of August 2023, Jain owns just under 70% of GQG while Carver owns 5.6%

In September 2024, GQG Partners was charged by the U.S. Securities and Exchange Commission for hindering whistleblower protections, through its restrictive non-disclosure agreements that disallowed employees from reporting potential violations.

== Investments ==
GQG invests in growth stocks that belong to more traditional industries such as oil, tobacco and banking. Some of its market bets can be considered to be following a contrarian investing approach.

During the 2022 stock market decline, GQG had inflows of US$8 billion and three of its four flagship funds beat the benchmark indexes. The fourth flagship fund focused on emerging markets which had a 21% loss that year due to its investments in Russia being affected by the Russian invasion of Ukraine. Jain apologized on a conference call to investors due to the losses incurred.

In early 2023. GQG funds lagged behind the benchmark as they had sold off their investments in internet companies of China last year and were not able to fully benefit from the upward trend when China opened up at the start of the year. The international fund at the time only gained 3.4% compared to the benchmark of 7.8%. In August that year, GQG started adding more positions of Chinese gaming and food delivery companies to its emerging market fund.

In March 2023, GQG announced it would invest US$1.9 billion into four of the Adani Group's publicly listed companies. This came at a time where share prices of Adani Group listed companies declined steeply due to the report released by Hindenburg Research in January that year. At that time, GQG's emerging market fund had 34% of its investments in Indian companies. In June, GQG bought a stakes worth US$1 billion in Adani Enterprises and Adani Green Energy. In August, GQG made further investments by buying a 8.1% stake in Adani Power for US$1.1 billion via block trades. On November 20, 2024, Gautam Adani and several business executives of the Adani Group were indicted by the U.S. Attorney's Office in Brooklyn, New York. As per United States of America v. Gautam Adani et al. they were charged for their alleged involvement in a scheme to pay hundreds of millions of dollars in bribes to Indian government officials and to hide the bribery from U.S. investors. As a result, GQG Partners’ shares fell as much as 25%.
