= Joint liability groups =

Joint liability groups are a concept established in India in 2014 by the rural development agency, National Bank for Agriculture and Rural Development (NABARD) to provide institutional credit to small farmers.

Joint Liability Group is a group of 4-10 people of the same village or locality of homogenous nature and of the same socioeconomic background who mutually come together to form a group for the purpose of availing loan from a bank without any collateral.

== Features ==
- Members should engage in a common activities.
- Members are not required to have land titles.
- Members should belong to the same village.
- Only one family member can join a JLG.
- Members cannot have a history of defaults on bank loans.
- Members should hold regular meetings.

== Promoting JLGs ==
JLGs can be promoted by business facilitators/correspondents, NGOs, farmers' clubs, farmers' federations, panchayati raj institutions, agricultural universities, bank branches, PACS, cooperative societies, individuals, mFIs and many others.

== SHG vs JLG ==
SHG is primarily a saving oriented group in which borrowing power is determined based on its saving. However, JLG is a credit oriented group which is primarily formed to avail loan from banks or formal credit institutions.

== Models ==
A bank can finance a JLG in two ways, either financing to a group directly or to an individual in the group. In both cases, all members of a JLG are responsible for repaying the loan amount.

== Documents required by banks for JLG ==
JLG should be first promoted by any individuals or institutions (JLGs promoting institutions). Thereafter, banks require KYC, loan application, inter-Se agreement and DPN.

== National Bank for Agriculture and Rural Development (NABARD) - JLGs scheme ==
NABARD supports the formation of JLG in project mode for availing micro credit from banks through all its offices across India. The scheme is implemented through good NGO, Farmers Clubs etc. NABARD has published one booklet on success stories of JLGs which is available on its website.
