= BharatPe =

Indian Financial Technology Company

- Company type: Private
- Website type: Financial service
- Available in: Multilingual
- Founded: 2018; 8 years ago
- Headquarters: New Delhi, {{{location_country}}}
- Area served: India
- Founders: Ashneer Grover; Shashvat Nakrani; Bhavik Koladiya
- Chairperson: Rajnish Kumar
- Key people: Nalin Negi (CFO); Ankur Jain (CPO); Aparna Kuppuswamy (CRO); Ajit Kumar (CTO); Parth Joshi (CMO)
- Industry: Internet; E-commerce
- Services: UPI payments and digital money lending for merchants
- Revenue: ▲₹1,700 crore (US$180 million) (FY24)
- Net income: ▲₹66 crore (US$6.9 million) (FY24)
- Parent: Resilient Innovations Private Limited
- Website: bharatpe.com
- Commercial: Yes
- Registration: Required
- Current status: Active

BharatPe is an Indian fintech company headquartered in New Delhi (Delhi NCR) that provides digital payment and financial services to small merchants and Grocery stores. Founded in 2018, the company offers unified QR code payment acceptance, point-of-sale (POS) devices, and merchant credit facilities.

== History ==
According to Peerzada Abrar of Business Standard, "BharatPe was founded in 2018 by Ashneer Grover and Shashvat Nakrani, with the vision of making financial inclusion a reality for Indian merchants."

In 2021, the company acquired Payback India, a "multi-brand loyalty programme".

In April 2024, BharatPe elevated Nalin Negi as its CEO, 15 months after he took over as the interim CEO and CFO in January 2023.

On 20 August 2024, BharatPe announced extending its credit offerings for its merchants to secured loans. The company will now enable secured two-wheeler loans and Loans Against Mutual Funds (LAMF) through lending partners OTO Capital for two-wheeler loans and Volt Money for LAMF.

=== Legal disputes ===
In 2022, BharatPe initiated an internal governance review into alleged financial irregularities involving co-founder Ashneer Grover, leading to his resignation and subsequent multi-year legal dispute, which were ultimately resolved through a mutual settlement in September 2024.

In 2023 Ashneer Grover, who had left the company, accused his fellow co-founder Bhavik Koladiya of data theft. Grover claimed that Koladiya, who has since left BharatPe, had stolen data of 150 million users. In November 2023, BharatPe filed a petition against Ashneer Grover for allegedly disclosing confidential information. BharatPe announced on Sep 30 2024 that it had reached a settlement with him. Under this agreement, a portion of his shares will be transferred to the Resilient Growth Trust. Both sides have consented to refrain from any legal proceedings as part of the settlement.
