= Scheduled Banks =

Banks holding reserves above a specific level

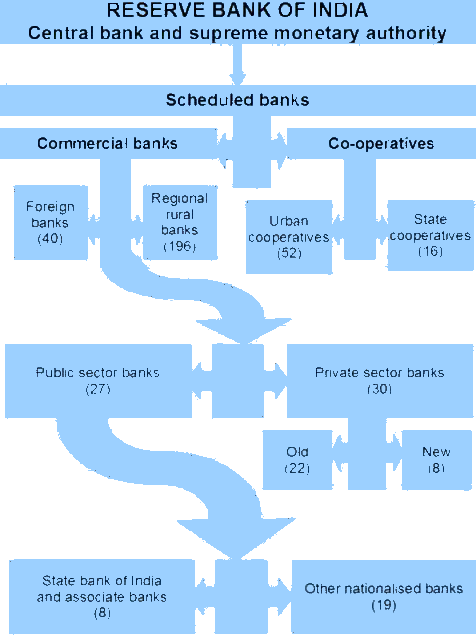
Structure of the organised banking sector in India.

Scheduled Banks in India refer to those banks which have been included in the Second Schedule of Reserve Bank of India Act, 1934. Reserve Bank of India (RBI) in turn includes only those banks in this Schedule which satisfy all the criteria laid down via section 42(6)(a) of the said Act.

== Facilities ==
Every scheduled bank get access to two types of principal facilities: it becomes eligible for debts/loans at the bank rate from the RBI; and, it automatically acquires the membership of clearing house.

== Types of banks ==
There are two main categories of Scheduled Banks in India, namely:

- Scheduled Commercial Banks
- Scheduled Co-operative Banks

Scheduled Commercial Banks are further divided into six types, as below:

1. Scheduled Public Sector Banks
2. Scheduled Private Sector Banks
3. Scheduled Small Finance Banks
4. Scheduled Regional Rural Banks
5. Foreign Banks
6. Scheduled Payments Banks

Scheduled Co-operative Banks are further divided into two types, as below:

1. Scheduled State Co-operative Banks
2. Scheduled Urban Co-operative Banks

== See also ==
- Banking in India
- List of banks in India
