= Banking in Karnataka =

Banking in southwest India

The state of Karnataka, particularly the coastal districts of Dakshina Kannada and Udupi, historically and collectively known as South Canara, is called the cradle of banking in India. This is because seven of the country's leading banks, Canara Bank, Syndicate Bank, Corporation Bank, Vijaya Bank, Karnataka Bank, Vysya Bank and the State Bank of Mysore originated from this state. The first five in the above list of banks were established in the districts of Udupi and Dakshina Kannada. These districts have one among the best distribution of banks in India - a branch for every 500 persons. Between 1880 and 1935, 22 banks were established in coastal Karnataka, nine of them in the city of Mangalore.

== Origin ==
The origin of banking in Karnataka's coastal region can be traced to the year 1868 when the Presidency Bank of Madras opened a branch to cater to the needs of British companies involved in exporting plantation produce. In 1912, the Indian Co-operative Societies Act in 1912 further energised the financial sector in this region leading to the establishment of a lot of co-operative societies. The freedom movement of India also played a crucial role as can be seen in the establishment of Karnataka Bank which was created as an offshoot of the swadeshi movement of 1905. These banks were earlier created to address the main sector in the economy i.e. agriculture but later they diversified to address other economical sectors as well.

Bank	Place of origin	Year
Canara Bank	Mangalore	1906; 119 years ago
Karnataka Bank	Mangalore	1924; 101 years ago
Vijaya Bank	Mangalore	1931; 94 years ago
Corporation Bank	Udupi	1906; 119 years ago
Syndicate Bank	Udupi	1925; 100 years ago
Vysya Bank	Bangalore	1930; 95 years ago
State Bank of Mysore	N/A	1913; 112 years ago

== Growth ==
The Indian Government's notification of nationalisation of banks in 1969 and 1980, resulted in lot of these banks being nationalised with the Indian Government now owning some amount of control over these banks. As of today, State Bank of Mysore, Canara Bank, Vijaya Bank and Vysya Bank have their headquarters in Bangalore, Corporation Bank and Karnataka Bank are headquartered in Mangalore while Syndicate Bank is headquartered in Manipal. The entry of the private sector into the banking sector with aggressive marketing has led these banks to rethink some of their strategies. Earlier, banking was the main activity that was undertaken by these banks but due to the competition, they have been forced to diversify into other areas like insurance, equity and mutual funds. They have also been forced to upgrade their technology and introduce services like ATMs and online-banking transactions.

As of March 2002, Karnataka had 4767 branches of different banks servicing the people of the state. The number of people served by each branch was 11,000 which is lesser than the national average of 16,000, thereby indicating better penetration of banking in the state.

== Banks ==
The scheduled banks in Karnataka had total deposit of Rs. 1346.99 billion constituting 6.4% of the total deposits in scheduled banks in India as of March 2006. The credit given by these banks stood at Rs. 1034.55 billion, 6.8% of total credit given by scheduled banks. The per capita deposit stood at Rs. 23,976 and per capita credit at Rs. 18,415.

=== Canara Bank ===
Canara Bank was established in 1906 by Ammembai Subba Rao Pai established the Canara Bank Hindu Permanent Fund in Mangalore, India, on 1 July 1906.Who collected handful of rice from each household, pooled the rice and sold it and used the money earned for the bank's capital. It has grown since then and now has 2542 branches in India and one overseas branch in London. In the fiscal year 2005-06, Canara Bank became India's second-largest public sector bank in terms of advances and deposits. The bank changed its name to Canara Bank Limited in 1910 when it incorporated. In 2002-03, the bank went in for its Initial Public Offer (IPO) and raised Rs.110 crores. The India government holds a 73% stake in Canara Bank.

=== Corporation Bank ===
Corporation Bank was founded by a group philanthropists headed by Khan Bahadur Haji Abdulla Haji Kasim Saheb Bahadur in the town of Udupi in 1906 under the name of "The Canara Banking Corporation (Udupi) Ltd". In 1972, it got its present name of Corporation Bank and it was nationalised in 1980.

=== State Bank of Mysore ===
State Bank of Mysore (SBM) was established in 1913 under the name Bank of Mysore Ltd. A banking committee headed by Sir M Visweswaraiah was formed under the patronage of the Mysore state which led to the formation of this bank. In 1960, this bank was made an associate bank of the State Bank of India which holds 92.33% of shares of SBM. As of Mar-2007, SBM has 644 branches and provides employment to 9604 employees.

=== Karnataka Bank ===
The Karnataka Bank was founded on 18 February 1924 at Mangalore.The bank initially catered to people of Karnataka, has now spread its network of branches throughout the country.

=== Syndicate Bank ===
Syndicate Bank was established in the town of Udupi in 1925 under the name "Canara Industrial and Banking Syndicate Ltd" with a capital of Rs.8000/- by three people - Upendra Ananth Pai, Vaman Kudva, and Dr. T M A Pai. The main objective for stating the bank was to extend financial assistance to the local weavers who were crippled by a crisis in the handloom industry. In 1963, it got its present name of Syndicate Bank. Now the bank has 2125 branches.

=== Vysya Bank ===
Vysya Bank was established in 1930, in Bangalore (now Bengaluru) with the aim of offering banking services to those who were currently not privileged enough to do so. In 1948 Vysya Bank became a scheduled bank. On 7 October 2002 ING Group took over the Management of the Bank. But again ING Vysya Bank has merged with Kotak Mahindra Bank with effect from 1 April 2015 and the combined entity bears the name Kotak Mahindra Bank. Before merger ING Vysya Bank had about 470 branches spread all over India.

=== Vijaya Bank ===
Vijaya Bank was established on 23 October 1931 at coastal city Mangalore by A. B. Shetty and others. The bank was established to help farming community. Later bank grew phenomenally under leadership of Mulki Sunder Ram Shetty during the 1960s. The Vijaya bank was nationalised in the 1980s by Government of India. The bank has presence in most of states of India. Later it was merged with Bank of Baroda along with Dena Bank on First April 2019.

== See also ==
- Banking in India
- Pigmy Deposit Scheme
