= Karnataka Grameena Bank =

Regional Rural Bank in Karnataka, India

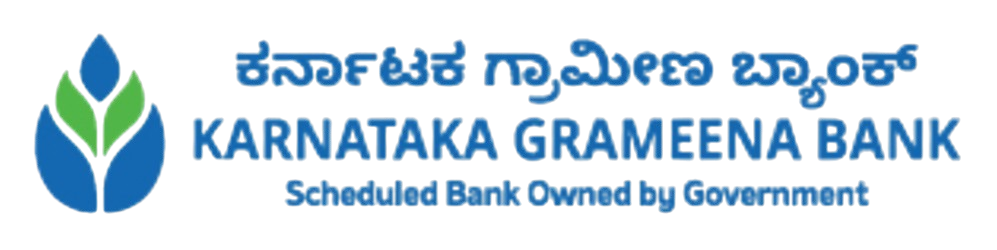
- Native name: ಕರ್ನಾಟಕ ಗ್ರಾಮೀಣ ಬ್ಯಾಂಕ್
- Type: Regional Rural Bank
- Industry: Financial; Regional Rural Banks
- Predecessor: Karnataka Gramin Bank; Karnataka Vikas Grameena Bank
- Founded: May 1, 2025; 17 months ago
- Headquarters: Ballari, Karnataka, India
- Number of locations: 1751 Branches
- Area served: Karnataka
- Key people: Sri Shrikant M Bhandiwad (Chairman)
- Products: Consumer banking; Corporate banking; Finance and insurance; Mortgage loans; Private banking; Savings; Asset management; Wealth management
- Services: Financial services; Banking
- Owner: Government of India (50%) Government of Karnataka (15%) Canara Bank (35%)
- Number of employees: 8000
- Parent: Ministry of Finance, Government of India
- Website: karnatakagb.bank.in; netbanking.karnatakagb.bank.in

The Karnataka Grameena Bank is an Indian Regional Rural Bank (RRB) in Karnataka established on 1 May 2025. The bank was formed by the amalgamation of Karnataka Gramin Bank and Karnataka Vikas Grameena Bank under The "One State, One RRB" policy of government designed to improve operational efficiency. The two banks have been amalgamated to form the unified Karnataka Grameena Bank. The newly-formed Karnataka Grameena Bank will continue to be government owned, with the central government holding a 50% stake, the state government 15% and Canara Bank (sponsor bank) 35%. The bank's services will now be extended across Karnataka, making it the second-largest regional rural rank in India with 1,751 branches and a business turnover of ₹1,04,851 crore.

It functions under Regional Rural Banks' Act 1976 and is sponsored by Canara Bank.

== History ==
=== Pragathi Krishna Grameena Bank ===
On 23 August 2013, Pragathi Krishna Gramin Bank, with its Head Office in Ballari, was formed through the amalgamation of two RRBs: Canara Bank sponsored Pragathi Gramin Bank (headquartered in Ballari) and the State Bank of India sponsored Krishna Grameena Bank (headquartered in Kalaburagi). The bank was formed as per gazette Notification of Government of India No. F1/5/2011- RRB (Karnataka) dated 23 August 2013.

=== Kaveri Grameena Bank ===
The Bank was started as Cauvery Grameena bank and served Mysore, Hassan and Chamarajanagar districts. The bank was renamed as Kaveri Grameena Bank on 1 November 2012 (sponsored by State Bank of Mysore) by Amalgamation of Cauvery Kalpatharu Grameena Bank, Chikmagalur Kodagu Grameena Bank and Vishvesvaraya Grameena Bank, sponsored by State Bank of Mysore, Corporation Bank and Vijaya Bank respectively.

The headquarters of Kaveri Grameena Bank was located at Vijayanagar Second Stage, Mysore, which is now converted as IT Centre of Karnataka Gramin Bank, post merger.

== See also ==
- Banking in India
- List of banks in India
- Reserve Bank of India
- Indian Financial System Code
- List of largest banks
- List of companies of India
- Make in India
