= Canara Engineering College =

Private engineering college in Karnataka, India

- Benjanapadavu
- Other name: CEC
- Motto: Persistent Perseverance In Pursuit of Perfection
- Type: Autonomous (Since 2025)
- Established: 2001
- Founder: Ammembal Subba Rao Pai
- Accreditation: Grade 'A' (NAAC Accredited)
- Affiliations: VTU
- Principal: Dr.Nagesh H R
- Location: Mangaluru, Karnataka, India; 12°54′6″N 74°59′58.2″E
- Campus: Rural, 26 acres (110,000 m^{2})
- Approvals: AICTE
- Website: canaraengineering.in

Canara Engineering College (CEC) is an autonomous private engineering college in Karnataka, India, approximately 22 km (14 mi) from Mangaluru in the surroundings of Benjanapadavu. It was established in 2001 as a Millennium project by Canara High School Association. The college is affiliated to Visvesvaraya Technological University, Belgaum . It is also recognized by government of Karnataka and is approved by AICTE, New Delhi. Approximately 500 engineers graduate annually.

== About The College ==
The college spreads over 26 acres in Benjanapadavu and is accessible from Mangalore or Bantwal. The college is equipped with Cafeteria, Wi-Fi campus, Gym, Basketball Court, Badminton Court, Football and Cricket Ground, Mess and Hostel facility along with college bus facility for Day Scholars.

CEC is run by Canara High School Association (CHSA), an association based in Mangaluru contributing towards Konkani linguistic minority education. The group was founded by the late Sri. Ammembal Subba Rao Pai (also founder of Canara Bank) in 1891. Ammembal Subbarao Pai was a social reformer and a philanthropist who aimed at imparting modern education blended with ancient cultural values to the youth of Dakshina Kannada. With this in mind he started the Canara High School Association with its primary project being the Canara High School which was established in 1891 and functions even today. The Group, which is now primarily funded by alumni, also runs several other educational institutions in and around Mangalore. Currently the principal of the college is Dr Nagesh H R.

== Courses ==
Following are the courses in the college:

- B.E in Artificial Intelligence and Machine learning
- B.E in Computer Science and Business System
- B.E in Computer Science and Design
- B.E in Computer Science and Engineering
- B.E in Electronics and Communication Engineering
- B.E in Information Science and Engineering
- B.E in Mechanical Engineering

== Professional Society Chapters and Clubs. ==
The following Professional Society Chapters function in the college:

- ISTE Student Chapter
- SAE Student Chapter
- IEEE Student Chapter
- CSI Student Chapter
- National Service Scheme
- CEC-UiPath Student Community
- Entrepreneurship Development Cell.
- Gavels Club.
- CEC Nexus Club.

== Technical & Cultural Events ==
Canara Engineering College hosts several events with the association of various technical chapters in the college. "Aakriti" is the annual national level Technical & Cultural event of the college. Several other events like INNOVATE, TECHNOPHILIA, TECHGURU, EMERGIA, CIPIX maintains associations of various technical chapters in the college. College has had a successful quiz club over the years winning a good number of competitions. Most Notably, Winning the first place in General Quiz in VTU's annual youth fest for the year 2018 a reputed competition where hundreds of colleges affiliated to the university had taken part.
