= Selection Day (TV series) =

Indian sports drama television series

- Poster
- Created by: Marston Bloom
- Based on: Selection Day by Aravind Adiga
- Written by: Marston Bloom
- Directed by: Udayan Prasad; Karan Boolani
- Starring: Mohammad Samad; Yash Dholye; Karanvir Malhotra; Rajesh Tailang; Mahesh Manjrekar; Ratna Pathak Shah; Shiv Panditt; Akshay Oberoi; Parul Gulati; Amruta Subhash
- Composer: Shashwat Sachdev
- Country of origin: India
- Original language: Hindi
- No. of seasons: 1 (2 parts)
- No. of episodes: 12

Production
- Producers: Anil Kapoor; Anand Tucker
- Production location: India
- Production companies: Anil Kapoor Films & Communication Network; Seven Stories Ltd.

Original release
- Network: Netflix
- Release: 28 December 2018 – 19 April 2019

Selection Day is an Indian sports drama television series, based on Aravind Adiga's 2016 novel of the same name. Produced by Anil Kapoor and Anand Tucker, and adapted for television by Marston Bloom (with Hindi dialogues by Sumit Arora) it stars Mohammad Samad, Yash Dholye, Karanvir Malhotra, Rajesh Tailang, Mahesh Manjrekar, Ratna Pathak Shah, Shiv Panditt, Parul Gulati, Amruta Subhash and Akshay Oberoi. The series follows the life of two brothers Radha and Manju who are raised by their cricket-obsessed father and meet their rival Javed. The first six episodes of Selection Day premiered on 28 December 2018 on Netflix. Part 2, consisting of another set of six episodes, was premiered on 19 April 2019.

== Plot ==
Radha and Manjunath are two brothers who have been trained by their father to become the next great pair of cricket batsmen. After toying with the bowling attacks of their local village teams, their father decides it is time for them to move to Mumbai and hope to be selected to play in domestic leagues in the upcoming selection season.

== Cast ==
- Mohammad Samad as Manju Kumar
- Yash Dholye as Radha Kumar
- Karanvir Malhotra as Javed Ansari
- Rajesh Tailang as Mohan Kumar
- Mahesh Manjrekar as Tommy Sir
- Ratna Pathak Shah as Nellie
- Shiv Panditt as Lord Subramanyam
- Akshay Oberoi as Anand Mehta
- Vipashyana Dubey as Zoya
- Parul Gulati as Monica Tandon
- Dibyendu Bhattacharya as Gulshan
- Pakhi Gupta as Sophia
- Amruta Subhash as Meera
- Hirdeyjeet Jarnail Singh as Panther's Coach

== Episodes ==
Series overview
Series	Episodes	Originally released
Part 1	6	28 December 2018
Part 2	6	19 April 2019

No. overall	No. in season	Title	Directed by	Written by	Original release date
Part 1
1	1	"Episode 1"	Udayan Prasad	Marston Bloom	28 December 2018
2	2	"Episode 2"	Udayan Prasad	Marston Bloom	28 December 2018
3	3	"Episode 3"	Udayan Prasad	Marston Bloom	28 December 2018
4	4	"Episode 4"	Udayan Prasad	Marston Bloom	28 December 2018
5	5	"Episode 5"	Udayan Prasad	Marston Bloom	28 December 2018
6	6	"Episode 6"	Udayan Prasad	Marston Bloom	28 December 2018
Part 2
7	1	"Episode 7"	Karan Boolani	Marston Bloom	19 April 2019
8	2	"Episode 8"	Karan Boolani	Marston Bloom	19 April 2019
9	3	"Episode 9"	Karan Boolani	Marston Bloom	19 April 2019
10	4	"Episode 10"	Karan Boolani	Marston Bloom	19 April 2019
11	5	"Episode 11"	Karan Boolani	Marston Bloom	19 April 2019
12	6	"Episode 12"	Karan Boolani	Marston Bloom	19 April 2019

== Marketing ==
The series was announced in August 2017. A 16-second teaser was released on 8 October 2018.
