= Selection Day =

2016 novel by Aravind Adiga

- First edition (UK)
- Author: Aravind Adiga
- Language: English
- Genre: Fictional
- Publisher: Picador (UK); HarperCollins (India)
- Publication date: 2016
- Publication place: India
- Media type: Print (paperback, hardback)
- Pages: 288
- ISBN: 978-93-5177-828-8

Selection Day is a 2016 sports fiction novel written by Booker Prize winner Aravind Adiga. It was shortlisted along with four other writers for the 2017 DSC Prize for South Asian Literature. It tells the story of Mohan Kumar, a chutney seller who trains his two sons: Manju Kumar and Radha Krishna for Mumbai's under-19 cricket team. Here Manju meets his rival, Javed. It was adapted into a Netflix series of the same name.

== Reception ==
Laura Miller felt that Adiga comes closer than most in becoming a dickensian. She wrote: "His characters are brightly and sharply drawn and animated with great energy; reading about his Mumbai is like taking a double shot of espresso." Elizabeth Kuruvilla of Mint wrote: "Adiga’s novel oscillates between lyrically exposing what the brutal system in the business of creating sporting heroes does to the minds, and lives, of vulnerable youth and an amateurish filling in of gaps with monologue and characters that are inadequately fleshed out." Jade Colbert of The Globe and Mail said that "[It] is not a novel you read to find consolation from the melancholy realities of the world's injustices, but to know them, and feel Manju's scorn." Ludovic Hunter-Tilney of Financial Times called it "mixes incisive stroke play with streaky shots." He further wrote: "Adiga’s prose has a bustling energy that makes it highly readable but also reduces characters to certain cartoonish traits, such as the slanted furrow in Manju’s forehead that appears whenever he thinks deeply, or the “rakishly” raised right eyebrow that signals his father's outbreaks of anger."

Michael Upchurch of Chicago Tribune gave a positive response and wrote: "Selection Day brings a family, a city and an entire country to scabrous and antic life." Annalisa Quinn of NPR called the novel "exuberant and incisive". Kamila Shamsie praised the writing and mentioned that Adiga knows how to talk about class, religion and sexuality "through his characters and their compelling stories." Marcel Theroux praised Adiga for adding "pathos and depth" to his minor characters and felt the novel possesses the breadth similar to The White Tiger. Dwight Garner felt that the plot loses its "altitude on occasion". Ron Charles of The Washington Post wrote that "[..] Adiga’s voice is so exuberant, his plotting so jaunty, that the sadness of this story feels as though it is accumulating just outside our peripheral vision." Keshava Guha of The Hindu called it "a moving, unsettling and absorbing story of aspiration and its discontents in contemporary urban India." Malcolm Forbes called it "another great delivery" but felt the novel lacked the "satirical bite and societal sweep" of The White Tiger.

== Adaptation ==
In August 2017, it was announced that Netflix will be adapting the novel into an original series which was produced by partnership with Anil Kapoor and Anand Tucker. Starring Mohammad Samad, Yash Dholye, Karanvir Malhotra, Rajesh Tailang, Mahesh Manjrekar, Ratna Pathak Shah, Shiv Panditt, Parul Gulati and Akshay Oberoi, the series premiered on 28 December 2018.
