= Between the Assassinations =

2008 book by Aravind Adiga

- First edition (India)
- Author: Aravind Adiga
- Language: English
- Publisher: Picador (India)
- Publication date: 1 November 2008
- Publication place: India
- Media type: Print (Paperback)
- Pages: 300
- ISBN: 978-0-330-45054-6
- Followed by: The White Tiger

Between the Assassinations is a 2008 collection of short stories written by Aravind Adiga. It was published by Picador in India in 2008, and in Britain and the United States in 2009. While it reveals the beauty of the rural, coastal south where it is set, its subject is the pathos, injustices and ironies of Indian life.

It was Adiga's second published book, though it was either written before his first, The White Tiger, or written in parallel with The White Tiger. The title refers to the period between the assassination of Indira Gandhi in 1984 and the assassination of her son, Rajiv Gandhi, in 1991. Indira Gandhi was the serving Prime Minister of India when she was assassinated; Rajiv Gandhi became Prime Minister in 1984, and left office following his party's defeat in the 1989 general election.

== Overview ==
The stories take place in the fictitious town of Kittur in Karnataka, Southwest India. It was originally modeled on Adiga's hometown of Mangalore but was substantially changed to make room for more diverse plots and characters. The stories revolve around different classes, castes and religions in India. In each story, another set of characters is introduced, but places and names appear again in other stories.

Even though it was published after The White Tiger, Between the Assassinations was started—and most likely finished—before The White Tiger. The servant who is tempted to run away with his master's money, the village hick sent to town, Nepali guards and a hit-and-run accident by a rich man, which is subsequently covered up by corrupt policemen, all appear in Between the Assassinations as well as in The White Tiger
