= Ramesh Gelli =

Indian banking executive

Chairman and Managing Director (CMD) Global Trust Bank (India)
- In office 1993–2001

Chairman and Managing Director (CMD) Vysya Bank

Ramesh Gelli is an Indian banking executive who served as the chairman and managing director (CMD) of Vysya Bank and was a promoter and CMD of Global Trust Bank. Gelli set up GTB in 1993 along with Jayant Madhab, a top official of the Asian Development Bank. In 2001, Gelli was removed from his position of CMD of GTB and later from its board by India's banking regulator, the Reserve Bank of India (RBI) following a failed merger attempt. In 2004, GTB operations were halted by the RBI as GTB had accumulated non-performing assets in excess of permissible levels and its net worth turned negative, amidst accusations of mismanagement and reckless lending practices. GTB was then merged with the Oriental Bank of Commerce by the regulator.

Gelli is an engineering graduate from Osmania University and he holds a degree in management from the Asian Institute of Management, where he graduated at the top of his class. He worked at the Andhra Pradesh State Finance Corporation and Bharat Heavy Electricals Limited before being appointed general manager at Vysya Bank in 1980. Three years later, he was elevated to the position of CMD of Vysya Bank.

He was awarded the Padma Shri and the Udyog Ratan by the Government of India in 1990, becoming the first banking executive to have received the honour.

== Citations and references ==
Citations

References

- Gupte, V. Yatin (July 2004) Impact Analysis: GTB-OBC merger. - accessed 2 November 2014.
- Marcello, Ray (27 July 2004) "RBI directs Global Trust Bank to Merge". Financial Times. - accessed 2 November 2014.
- Sridhar, V. (14-27 August 2004) "The Collapse of a bank". Frontline, Vol. 21, #17. - accessed 2 November 2014.
