= Kayarthadka =

Village in Belthangadi, India

Coordinates: 12°55′56″N 75°26′15″E

Kayarthadka is a village (grama) in Belthangadi (Belthangady) taluk of Dakshina Kannada district, Karnataka state, India (Bharat).It lies on the foothills of western ghats. There is a branch of Karnataka Bank Limited at Kayarthadka as financial inclusion branch which means to bring banking services to remote villages. There is a branch post office at Kayarthadka with Postal Index Number Code (Pincode) 574216.There is also a milk producers co-operative society Most of the people living in this village depend on agriculture and horticulture for their livelihood. There is Uma Maheshwara temple at Kayarthadka.
