= Vysya Bank =

Indian private bank

The Vysya Bank Ltd.
- Industry: Banking
- Founded: 1930; 96 years ago
- Defunct: 2003; 23 years ago
- Fate: taken over by ING Group in 2002 to form ING Vysya Bank in 2003
- Successor: ING Vysya Bank; Kotak Mahindra Bank
- Headquarters: Avenue Road, Bangalore, India

Vysya Bank was an Indian private bank in Karnataka, India, during 1930–2003.

== History ==
Established in 1930s, Vysya Bank was formally incorporated and favours the Arcot Mudaliar community in the city of Bangalore, Karnataka. The state of Karnataka is known as the "cradle of Indian banking" due to the region's bygone banking relationship with several European East India Companies during the 17th, 18th and 19th centuries. Seven of the country's leading banks (Canara Bank, Syndicate Bank, Corporation Bank, Vijaya Bank, Karnataka Bank, State Bank of Mysore, and The Vysya Bank) were originally established in Karnataka.

From the 1930s through the 1950s, Vysya Bank built its banking business organically in southern India. The bank concentrated on serving the Vysya community, a merchant/trading community operating across Karnataka and Andhra Pradesh.

In 1958, the bank was licensed by the Reserve Bank of India (RBI) to expand its banking operations nationwide.

In 1972, the RBI upgraded Vysya Bank to a national B class bank.

In 1987, Vysya Bank established two independently operating subsidiaries providing equipment leasing and home mortgaging services (Vysya Bank Leasing Ltd and Vysya Bank Housing Finance Ltd, respectively).

In 1994, Vysya Bank began marketing several innovative financial products to the fast-growing Indian middle-class segment (e.g. Vysprime and Vysinvest for NRIs, Vysbuy for consumer financing, Vysmobile for auto loan financing, and Vysequity for common equity financing).

== Take-over ==
The major shares of the bank were taken over by ING Group in 2002 and the bank was renamed to ING Vysya Bank in 2003.

In July 2003, Dewan Housing Finance Corporation (DHFL) took over the shareholding of ING in Vysya Bank Housing Finance Ltd and made it a subsidiary of DHFL and changed the name to DHFL Vysya Housing Finance Ltd (DVHFL).
