= Karnataka Vikas Grameena Bank =

Indian regional rural Bank

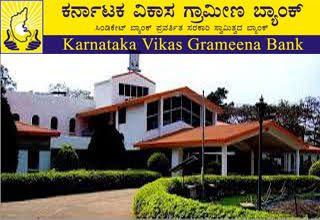
- Karnataka Vikas Grameena Bank Headquarters at Dharwad
- Type: Regional rural bank
- Industry: Banking; Financial services
- Predecessor: Varada Grameena Bank; Netravati Grameena Bank; Bijapur Grameena Bank; Malaprabha Grameena Bank
- Founded: 12 September 2005; 21 years ago
- Defunct: 30 April 2025
- Fate: Merged with Karnataka Gramin Bank to form Karnataka Grameena Bank
- Successor: Karnataka Grameena Bank
- Headquarters: Dharwad, Karnataka, India
- Number of locations: 629 branches (2024)
- Area served: Karnataka, India
- Key people: Shrikant M Bhandiwad (Chairman )
- Products: Consumer banking; Corporate banking; Finance and insurance; Mortgage loans; Private banking; Savings; Asset management; Wealth management
- Owner: Government of IndiaGovernment of Karnataka Canara Bank
- Number of employees: 3500
- Parent: Ministry of Finance, Government of India
- Website: www.kvgbank.com

The Karnataka Vikas Grameena Bank (KVGB) (12 September 2005– 30 April 2025) was an Indian Regional Rural Bank sponsored by Canara Bank. It is under the ownership of the Ministry of Finance, Government of India. The bank provides retail banking services to rural users and has 629 branches in North and Western Karnataka. On 1 May 2025 Karnataka Vikas Grameena Bank amalgamated with Karnataka Gramin Bank to form Karnataka Grameena Bank

== History ==
The bank was constituted on 12 September 2005 after the amalgamation of four Regional Rural Banks (RRBs) namely Malaprabha Grameena Bank, Bijapur Grameena Bank, Varada Grameena Bank and Netravathi Grameena Banks, as per the recommendations of the Narasimhan Committee, under a Government of India notification dated 12 September 2005. All four amalgamated RRBs were sponsored by Syndicate Bank(Now Canara Bank) and were located in Karnataka.

At the time of amalgamation in 2005, the bank’s business was Rs. 23,263.73 Crore. It was named the Karnataka Vikas Grameena Bank. Its head office is at Dharwad. It is functioning under the sponsorship of Syndicate Bank (now Canara Bank). Shreekant M Bhandiwad, Deputy General Manager of Canara Bank, took charge as the Chairman of the Karnataka Vikas Grameena Bank (KVGB) on April 24, 2023. Prior to his becoming Chairman of KVGB, Bhandiwad headed the Patna circle of Canara Bank. He was the Deputy Managing Director of Canfin Homes Ltd for a period of three years.

For operational convenience, the bank has set up 10 Regional Offices at Bagalkot, Belagavi, Vijayapura, Chikodi, Dharwad, Gadag, Gokak, Haveri, Kumta & Mangaluru. The bank is operating in almost 1/3rd of the geographical area of Karnataka state, consisting of 6 districts of northern Karnataka and 3 districts of coastal Karnataka. The 6 northern districts are Vijayapur, Bagalkote, Belagavi, Dharwad, Gadag, Haveri and the 3 coastal districts are Uttara Kannada, Udupi & Dakshina Kannada.

The total business of the bank stands at Rs. 35,884 Crores as on 31.03.2024, consisting of Rs. 19,856 Crores deposits and advances of Rs. 16,027 Crores. It has Reserves of Rs. 1,368.61 Crores.

On 1 May 2025, the Karnataka Vikas Grameena Bank and Karnataka Gramin Bank sponsored by the Canara Bank in the State of Karnataka have amalgamated into a single Regional Rural Bank, called as Karnataka Grameena Bank with its head office at Ballari under the sponsorship of Canara Bank. Shreekant Bhandiwad who was heading Karnataka Vikas Grameena Bank took charge as the 1st Chairman of the Bank.

== Area of operations ==
The Head Office of the Bank is situated at Dharwad, located in the state of Karnataka. The bank is currently operating in 9 districts in the State:-

- Bagalkote
- Belagavi
- Vijayapura (Bijapura)
- Dakshina Kannada
- Dharwad
- Gadag
- Haveri
- Udupi
- Uttara kannada

== Deposit schemes ==
- Vikas Sanchayani Plus
- Vikas Santusti Deposit Scheme With Overdraft Facility
- Vikas Ashadeep 400
- Vikas Siri Sampat 1111
- Akshaya Cash Certificate
- Nirantara Daily Deposit Scheme
- Vikas Tax Ulitaya - Tax Saving Fixed Deposit

== Loan products ==
- Vikas Griha
- Vikas Adhar - Mortgage Loan
- Vikas Pratibha - Education Loan Scheme for Studies in India & Abroad
- Vikas Kisan Credit Card
- Agri Tourism
- Vikas Saathi - Mobile Van For Dealers & Traders
- Model Dairy Unit
- Vikas Grihalankar - Interior Decoration of Residential House
- Financing To Landscape Work
- Vikas Griha Flexi - Housing Loan Overdraft Facility
- Drip Irrigation Facility
- Vikas Vahan - Vehicle Loans For All
- Vikas Sarala Sanjeevini - OD Facility To Doctors
- Vikas Mitra Scheme - Vehicle Loan To Milk Vendors & Others
- Vikas Annapoorna - For Hotel & Restaurants
- Vikas Nirantara – DL on Pigmy
- Vikas Suvarna – Jewel Loan Scheme
- VIKAS KIRAN – Solar Home Lighting & Water Heating Systems loans

== See also ==
- Banking in India
- List of banks in India
- Reserve Bank of India
- Regional Rural Bank
- Indian Financial System Code
- List of largest banks
- List of companies of India
- Make in India
