= Last Man in Tower (film) =

2026 Indian film by Ben Rakhi

- Theatrical release poster
- Directed by: Ben Rekhi
- Screenplay by: Sooni Taraporevala
- Dialogues by: Juhi Chaturvedi
- Story by: Aravind Adiga
- Based on: Last Man in Tower by Aravind Adiga
- Produced by: Rana Daggubati; Guneet Dogra; Pratiksha Rao; Ben Rekhi
- Starring: Manoj Bajpayee; Boman Irani; Divya Dutta
- Cinematography: Rangarajan Ramabadran
- Edited by: Meghna Sen; Akshara Prabhakar
- Music by: Govind Vasantha
- Production company: Spirit Media
- Release date: 11 September 2026
- Running time: 97 minutes
- Country: India
- Language: Hindi

Last Man in Tower is a 2026 Indian Hindi drama film directed by Ben Rekhi. It is based on the novel of the same name by Aravind Adiga with a screenplay by Sooni Taraporevala and dialogues by Juhi Chaturvedi. It is produced by Rana Daggubati's film production company Spirit Media. It stars Manoj Bajpayee, Boman Irani and Divya Dutta in the lead roles.

== Plot ==
In Mumbai's Vakola suburb, the residents of Vishram Society —an ageing, multi-religious middle-class housing complex— live in relative harmony. Among them is Yogesh Mishra who resides in a flat filled with memories of his late wife and tutors local children. When Dharmen Shah (Boman Irani), a wealthy and relentless real estate developer, offers the society's owners a lucrative cash buyout to demolish the crumbling building and construct a luxury high-rise.

While the majority of the residents, driven by financial security or personal ambitions, eagerly agree to the offer, Masterji refuses to sell. He contends that the complex holds sentimental value and that the residents are legally entitled to refuse forced displacement. His decision stalls the entire deal, as Shah's contract requires unanimous consent from all flat owners before the deadline, after which the buyout offer expires.

Shah subtly manipulates the residents to pressure Masterji into signing. Led by Mrs. Puri, a desperate mother seeking financial security for her son, and Mr. Ajwani, the neighbours turn against Masterji. Initial attempts at persuasion quickly escalate into intimidation, gossip, and ostracisation. Even Masterji’s pragmatic son, Gaurav, urges his father to take the money and move, causing a rift between them.

As the deadline approaches, the society cuts off Masterji's water and electricity supplies, vandalises his front door, and subjected him to intense psychological harassment. Despite facing complete isolation and physical intimidation, Masterji remains steadfast in his refusal to yield.

== Cast ==
- Manoj Bajpayee as Yogesh Mishra aka Masterji, a widowed retired school teacher
- Boman Irani as Dharmen Shah, a real estate developer
- Divya Dutta as Mrs. Sangeeta Puri, a mother having a neurodivergent son
- Sukant Goel as Gaurav Mishra, Masterji's son
- Chandan Roy Sanyal as Mr. Ramesh Ajwani, a real estate broker
- Darshan Jariwala as Mr. Parekh, a lawyer
- Harish Khanna as Mr. Kothari
- Swaroopa Ghosh as Mrs. Audrey Rego
- Ujjwal Chopra as Mr. Sanjiv Puri, Mrs. Puri's husband
- Uday Chandra as Mr. Albert Pinto
- Madhuri Bhatia as Mrs. Shelly Pinto, Albert Pinto's wife
- Shrikant Yadav as Shanmugham
- Salim Siddiqui as Mr. Ibrahim Kudwa "Ibby"
- Tanisha Mehta
- Ajay Raju as construction worker

== Release ==
On 26 August 2026, the teaser was released. It was released on 11 September 2026.

== Reception ==
Sana Farzeen of India Today gave the film 3.5 out of 5 stars, describing it as a "sharp, unsettling study of ambition, greed, loneliness and the complicated business of letting go." She praised the performances of Bajpayee and Dutta, calling Bajpayee's portrayal a "masterclass in human behaviour," and commended director Rekhi for maintaining an intimate narrative focus without reducing the characters to simple moral tropes. Shubhra Gupta of The Indian Express rated the film 2.5 out of 5 stars, calling Bajpayee the "unbending moral centre of the film" and praising Dutta's performance. However, she felt the adaptation lacked the "satirical edge" of the novel, leading to a somewhat bland tone despite strong lead performances and an authentic depiction of Mumbai's redevelopment struggles. Rahul Desai of The Hollywood Reporter India praised the film as a "well-acted and sobering middle-class tragedy," commending its refusal to rely on predictable feel-good tropes. Desai lauded Bajpayee's performance as a complex, stubborn dissenter "cornered by his morality," while calling Dutta a "scene-stealer" for bringing depth and psychological tension to her role. Sreeju Sudhakaran of Rediff.com gave the film 3.5 out of 5 stars, describing it as an "unsettling portrait of a society that can turn against one another when greed dangles the promise of a better life." Sudhakaran praised Bajpayee's restrained depiction of psychological isolation and highlighted Dutta's performance as a "chilling" portrayal of moral devolution, while commending director Rekhi for creating a taut, realistic narrative. Renuka Vyavahare of The Times of India gave the film 4 out of 5 stars, calling it a "poignant, relevant and haunting" depiction of Mumbai's changing social landscape. Roy lauded Bajpayee as the "soul of the film" and highlighted Dutta's performance as an "outstanding parallel lead," praising the film's ability to accommodate conflicting viewpoints without declaring one side entirely right or wrong.
