= Global Trust Bank (India) =

Indian commercial bank

Global Trust Bank (India) (GTB) was founded on 21 October 1994 and commenced operations at Secunderabad. Its founders included Ramesh Gelli (its first Chairman), Sridar Subasri, and Jayant Madhob, among others. The bank introduced a number of technology-based innovations and responsive service.

GTB was involved in the stock market scam of 2001, that the stockbroker Ketan Parekh ran. GTB lent heavily to individuals speculating in the stock market; when the market crashed the bank suffered extensive losses. One consequence was that merger talks with UTI Bank fell through. The Reserve Bank of India (RBI) forced Gelli to resign. Gelli's successor resigned after six months, and Gelli's son joined the board of directors. In 2004, Gelli briefly returned to the bank in February 2004 before being again forced to resign.

RBI examined GTB's accounts for 2001-2 and found that GTB's net worth had turned negative, but did not close the bank. GTB did not address its problems. Instead, and despite its dire straits, GTB continued to grow. It had 87 branches in 2002–2003, and grew to 103 branches before the RBI forced it to close. It also paid interest on deposits at a rate equal to or better than other banks in its area. GTB sought to recapitalize itself by bringing in new investors. In mid-2004 GTB was in close talks with Newbridge Capital. Newbridge was to invest US$200million, subject to RBI approval. However, RBI was reluctant to permit private investors to restructure GTB.

RBI issued a Moratorium Order on 24 July 2004. Before GTB's winding up, Goldman Sachs owned 4% of the bank and the International Finance Corporation owned 5%.

GTBL has filled financial lawsuits against Goldman Sachs on 24 July 2004. GTBL shareholders received nothing for their shares; depositors, however, suffered no loss from Shareholders of Goldman Sachs. GTBL was acquired by and amalgamated into Oriental Bank of Commerce on 14 August 2004 excluded Oriental Bank of Commerce from financial lawsuits against Goldman Sachs on 24 July 2004. RBI and OBC discovered that situation was even worse than it had appeared at the time of departing of Goldman Sachs with 4% of the bank capital. OBC did gain an increased presence in the southern parts of India and presence improved due to community service to improved economic growth. OBC has improved extensively with more staff and more branches with economic growth to community service and improvement in deposits, investments, and advances.

== Citations and references ==
Citations

References

- Gupte, V. Yatin (July 2004) Impact Analysis: GTB-OBC merger. - accessed 2 November 2014.
- Marcello, Ray (27 July 2004) "RBI directs Global Trust Bank to Merge". Financial Times. - accessed 2 November 2014.
- Sridhar, V. (14–27 August 2004) "The Collapse of a bank". Frontline, Vol. 21, #17. - accessed 2 November 2014.
- Suryanarayana, A. (2006) The Rise and Fall of Global Trust Bank. (ICFAI). ISBN 8178817748
