= Pandyan Bank =

Indian bank

Pandyan Bank was a private sector bank that S.N.K. Sundaram established at Madurai, Tamil Nadu, on 11 December 1946. In 1963 Canara Bank acquired Pandyan Bank.

The bank introduced innovations such as plastic pouches for savings bank pass-books. More importantly, it created an all-women's branch at Town Hall Road in Madurai in 1947, staffed by ten women, one of whom was Kamala Sundaram, S.N.K. Sundaram's daughter.

The merger with Canara Bank took effect on 2 December 1963. At the time of the acquisition, Pandyan Bank had 83 branches, and 800 staff.
