= K. Suryanarayana Adiga =

Indian lawyer and politician

Kakkunje Suryanarayana Adiga
- Born: 5 November 1914; Kakkunje, Madras Presidency, British India
- Died: 23 April 1989 (aged 74); Mangalore, India
- Occupations: lawyer, politician

Kakkunje Suryanarayana Adiga (5 November 1914 – 23 April 1989) was an Indian lawyer and politician who served as a member of the Mysore Legislative Council from 1966 to 1971. He was the Chairman of Karnataka Bank from 1958 to 1979. He is paternal grand father of Aravind Adiga.

== Early life ==
Suryanarayana Adiga was born on 5 November 1914 in the village of Kakkunje in the then South Canara district of Madras Presidency, British India. He took part in the Quit India Movement and studied law. He participated in local elections and served as President of the Mangalore municipality.

== Career ==
In 1945, Suryanarayana Adiga joined the board of Karnataka Bank as Director and became part-time Chairman in 1958. In 1971, he became full-time Chairman and served till 1979. During his tenure as chairman, the bank experienced unprecedented growth with the result that Karnataka Bank got the appellation "Adiga's Bank". After retirement in 1979, Adiga continued to serve as the bank's director till his death in 1989.

Adiga was elected to the Mysore State Legislative Council in 1966 on the South Canara Local Authorities seat. Adiga, however, resigned in 1971, a year before his tenure came to an end.

== Death ==
Suryanarayana Adiga died on 23 April 1989 at the age of 74.
