= Zindaginama =

- Promotional release poster
- Genre: Anthology
- Directed by: Sukriti Tyagi; Mitakshara Kumar; Sahaan Hattangadi; Danny Mamik; Aditya Sarpotdar; Rakhee Sandilya
- Starring: Prajakta Koli; Yashaswini Dayama; Lillete Dubey; Shreyas Talpade; Anjali Patil; Shweta Basu Prasad; Priya Bapat; Sumeet Vyas; Mohammad Samad; Shruti Seth; Tanmay Dhanania; Shivani Raghuvanshi; Sayandeep Sengupta
- Music by: Nitish Rambhadran
- Country of origin: India
- Original language: Hindi
- No. of episodes: 6

Production
- Camera setup: Multi-camera
- Running time: 33-42 minutes
- Production company: Applause Entertainment

Original release
- Network: SonyLIV
- Release: 10 October 2024

Zindaginama (transl. Lifelogue) is an Indian anthology streaming television series which premiered on SonyLIV on 10 October 2024. The series features six stand-alone episodes starring Prajakta Koli, Yashaswini Dayama, Lillete Dubey, Shreyas Talpade, Anjali Patil, Shweta Basu Prasad, Priya Bapat, Sumeet Vyas, Mohammad Samad, Shruti Seth, Tanmay Dhanania, Shivani Raghuvanshi and Sayandeep Sengupta.

== Cast ==
- Prajakta Koli as Mira
- Yashaswini Dayama as Maya
- Lillete Dubey
- Shreyas Talpade as Mukullll
- Anjali Patil as Devaki
- Rudrapratapsingh Thakur as Avinash
- Shweta Basu Prasad as Namrata
- Priya Bapat as Vaidehi
- Sumeet Vyas as Keith Braganza
- Mohammad Samad as Raju
- Shruti Seth as Dr. Pavitra
- Tanmay Dhanania as Raag
- Shivani Raghuvanshi as Lila
- Sayandeep Sengupta as Sahil
- Swaroopa Ghosh as Dr. Roy

== Reception ==
Deepa Gahlot of Rediff.com rated the series 3/5 stars. Tanmayi Savadi of Times Now too gave the series 3/5 stars. Sana Farzeen of India Today reviewed the series.
