= Krishna Grameena Bank =

Defuncted Indian regional bank

- Company type: Bank
- Industry: Banking, Insurance, Capital Markets and allied industries
- Founded: 1 December 1978
- Defunct: 23 August 2013
- Fate: Merged with newly formed Pragathi Krishna Gramin Bank
- Successor: Pragathi Krishna Gramin Bank
- Headquarters: Kalaburagi, India
- Area served: Karnataka
- Products: Deposits, Personal Banking Schemes, C & I Banking Schemes, Agri Banking Schemes, SME Banking Schemes
- Services: Loans, Deposits, ATM Services, National Electronic Fund Transfer (NEFT), Internet Banking, Debit Card
- Parent: SBI (35%)
- Website: karnatakagraminbank.com

Krishna Grameena Bank was an Indian Regional Rural Bank (RRB) established under 1976 Act for Regional Rural Banks. It was merged into Pragathi Krishna Gramin Bank in August 2013 which would later be merged into Karnataka Gramin Bank.

While it was operating it was a Scheduled Rural Bank owned by State Bank of India (35%), Government of India (50%) and Government of Karnataka (15%), working as per instructions of the Reserve Bank of India and carried out multiple types of transactions in banking business. The Bank operated in the districts of Kalaburagi, Bidar and Yadgir of Karnataka state in the southwestern region of India, and was headquartered at Kalaburagi.

== History ==
RRBs were set up in India specially to cater to the basic banking needs of rural people, to enhance rural economy and development of the rural areas and to ensure the employment for the people from Rural sector. Like Public Sector Banks, RRBs were established by Government of India and are also Scheduled Banks, since they worked as per the rules of the Indian Reserve Bank.

Krishna Grameena Bank was established with Head Office at Kalaburagi on 1 December 1978.

As of 2005, Krishna Grameena Bank had 119 branches, out of which 94 were in rural areas. It bagged Third Prize from National Bank for Agriculture and Rural Development for fulfilling the guidelines of NABARD under SHG Bank Linkage Program in Karnataka state (2005/2006). Krishna Grameena Bank was one among the two Regional Rural Banks in India, picked by NABARD for execution of Pilot basis Smart Cards, where Micro-Processor Cards were used by members of SHG to check the account balances in their Savings bank account and to withdraw cash from their respective savings bank accounts avoiding the intervention of the Bank staff or Rural Development Officer.

On 23 August 2013, it was merged with Pragathi Gramin Bank to form Pragathi Krishna Gramin Bank.

== See also ==
- Indian banking
- List of banks in India
- Kaveri Grameena Bank
