= Mayasabha – The Hall of Illusion =

2025 film directed by Rahi Anil Barve

- Theatrical release poster
- Directed by: Rahi Anil Barve
- Written by: Rahi Anil Barve
- Produced by: Girish Patel; Ankoor J. Singh; Shamrao Bhagwan Yadav; Chanda Yadav; Manish Handa; Kewal Handa
- Starring: Jaaved Jaaferi; Mohammad Samad; Veena Jamkar; Deepak Damle
- Cinematography: Kuldeep Mamania
- Edited by: Aasif Pathan
- Music by: Sagar Desai (background score)
- Production companies: Astonia Media Entertainment; The Third Eye Kreative Films; Zirkon Films
- Distributed by: Pickle Entertainment; UFO Moviez
- Release dates: November 2025 (JFF); 30 January 2026
- Running time: 104 minutes
- Country: India
- Language: Hindi

Mayasabha – The Hall of Illusion is a 2025 Indian Hindi-language psychological thriller film written and directed by Rahi Anil Barve. It is the second directorial venture of Rahi Anil Barve after Tumbbad. It stars Jaaved Jaaferi, Mohammad Samad, Veena Jamkar and Deepak Damle. The film premiered at the Jagran Film Festival in November 2025 and was released theatrically on 30 January 2026.

== Synopsis ==
Parmeshwar Khanna, a once-successful film producer, now lives with his son inside a dilapidated movie theater. His life takes an unsettling turn when he becomes involved in a treasure hunt alongside his son's friends. As the search unfolds, layers of greed, illusion, and buried secrets begin to surface. The narrative gradually blurs the line between reality and perception, offering a surreal and symbolically charged examination of human desire, where the audience's understanding of truth increasingly departs from that of the characters.

== Cast ==
- Jaaved Jaaferi as Parmeshwar Khanna
- Mohammad Samad as Vasu
- Veena Jamkar as Zeenat
- Deepak Damle as Ravarana

== Marketing ==
The motion poster for the film was revealed by the director on November 17, 2025. The teaser of the film was released on 14 January 2026.

== Release ==
Mayasabha premiered at the Jagran Film Festival in November 2025. It was given a special screening at the Third Asian Film Festival, scheduled from January 9 to 15, 2026. The film was subsequently selected for the Indian Cinema section at the Pune International Film Festival (PIFF) 2026, organized by the Government of Maharashtra, where it was screened on 17 January 2026. The film was theatrically released on 30 January 2026.

== Reception ==
Mayasabha received mixed reviews from critics.

Saibal Chatterjee of NDTV rated the film 4 stars out of 5 and wrote "Mayasabha is a miasmic movie experience that takes its time to reveal its hand fully. Once it does, it sucks you in. And it lingers long after it has run its course." Rahul Desai of The Hollywood Reporter India commented that "Rahi Anil Barve’s intriguing second film after 'Tumbbad' is an original but less-than-affecting psychological drama and more art than heart.

Priyanka Sharma of India Today rated the film 2.5 stars out of 5 and wrote "If it seems too niche for the average theatre-going crowd, the film deserves to find an audience on OTT, where its layered storytelling would be discovered without the pressure of box office expectations." Abhishek Srivastava of The Times of India gave 2.5 stars out of 5 and observed that "‘Mayasabha’ leaves you with more appreciation than emotion. You respect the attempt, the craft, and the seriousness of intent, but respect is not the same as involvement. The film feels content to exist in its own space, even if the audience starts to slip away."

Deepa Gahlot of Rediff.com gave 2.5 stars out of 5 and observed that "The visuals in Mayasabha are overwhelming, the treatment is heavy-handed, and the performances overdone."
