= ING Vysya Bank =

Indian bank

- Traded as: BSE: 531807; NSE: INGVYSYABK
- Industry: Banking, financial services & insurance
- Founded: 2002 (est. 1930 as Vysya Bank)
- Fate: merged with Kotak Mahindra Bank
- Headquarters: Bangalore, India
- Key people: Meleveetil Damodaran (Chairman); Uday Sareen (MD & CEO)
- Revenue: ₹55.88 billion (US$580 million)
- Net income: ₹6.13 billion (US$64 million)
- Total assets: ₹548.36 billion (US$5.7 billion)
- Number of employees: Over 10,000 No. of Branches: 527 No. of ATMS: 405 No. of Extension counters: 10
- Website: ~~ING Vysya Bank~~ Kotak Bank & ING Vysya Merger

ING Vysya Bank was a privately owned Indian multinational bank based in Bangalore, with retail, wholesale, and private banking platforms formed from the 2002 purchase of an equity stake in Vysya Bank by the Dutch ING Group. This merger marked the first between an Indian bank and a foreign bank. Prior to this transaction, Vysya Bank had a seven-year-old strategic alliance and shareholding arrangement with erstwhile Belgian bank Banque Bruxelles Lambert, which was also acquired by ING Group in 1998.

As of March 2013, ING Vysya was the seventh largest private sector bank in India with assets totalling ₹548.36 billion (US$5.7 billion) and operating a pan-India network of over 1,000 outlets, including 527 branches, which serviced over two million customers. ING Group, the highest-ranking institutional shareholder, held a 44% equity stake in ING Vysya Bank, followed by Aberdeen Asset Management, private equity firm ChrysCapital, Morgan Stanley, and Citigroup, respectively.

ING Vysya Bank was ranked among top five Most Trusted Brands among private sector banks in India in the Economic Times Brand Equity – Neilsen survey 2011. The bank had also been ranked the "Safest Banker" by the New Indian Express and among "Top 5 Most Trusted Private Sector Banks" by the Economic Times.

On 20 November 2014, in an all-stock amalgamation, ING Vysya Bank decided to merge with Kotak Mahindra Bank, creating the fourth largest private sector bank in India. On 1 April 2015, the Reserve Bank of India approved the merger. On 15 May 2016 the whole merger process was completed.

== History ==
=== Early years ===
see Vysya Bank

=== Globalisation through Europe ===
In 1995, Vysya Bank entered into a long-term strategic alliance with Belgian bank Bank Bruxelles Lambert (BBL). Following this agreement, the Vysya Bank engaged KPMC Peat Marwick international investment banking joint venture (JV) with MC Securities (London), an investment banking subsidiary of BBL, was formally established.

In 1998, the ING Group acquired BBL and all its contractual and JV interests in Vysya Bank. In 1999, Vysya Bank joined the ING Group in co-marketing/distribution of life insurance products in India. Vysya Bank also acquired a 26% equity stake in the ING Asset Management Company. In 2000, Vysya Bank, ING Insurance, and the Damani Group formed a life insurance JV; this innovative collaboration marks the first bancassurance venture in India.

=== Formal merger with the ING Group ===
In 2002, Vysya Bank's board of directors and the RBI approved Vysya Bank's formal merger with the ING Group. Under Indian law, this move allowed ING to increase its total equity holdings in Vysya Bank from 20% to 44%. Peter Alexander Smyth and Jacques PM Kemp were appointed to the board of the newly formed ING Vysya Bank.

ING Vysya Bank then appointed Bart Hellemans as CEO and managing director (MD) and G Mallikarjuna Rao as chairman of the board.

=== Post-merger news ===
In 2003, Western Union, a leading global money transfer firm, tied up with ING Vysya for inbound money transfer services across India. ING Vysya then launched three new endowment products and an innovative retail savings account called Orange with facilities such as personal accident and free annual accident coverage. Japanese auto manufacturer Toyota then signed an agreement with ING Vysya for auto financing services. ING Vysya then inked a deal with fertilizer producers, Madras Fertiliser Ltd (MFL), to co-market/distribute life insurance products to farmers by employing the fertilizer company's broker-dealer network in the rural sector.

In 2005, ING Vysya Bank named Ned Swarup to the CEO and MD role. ING Vysya launched a cheque account product for mid-sized businesses. It also rolled-out its own proprietary online money transfer service.

In 2006, Vaughn Richtor stepped into the CEO and MD role for a fixed three-year term. Under Mr Richtor's leadership, ING Vysya went private and delisted from the Bangalore Stock Exchange. ING Vysya also forayed into private banking and portfolio management services.

In 2009, Shailendra Bhandari was appointed as CEO and MD. He was formerly the Head of Private Equity at Tata Capital, the Tata Group's private equity arm. Having completed his three-year term in India, Vaughn Richtor was promoted to CEO of ING Banking Asia.

In 2010, the Board of ING Vysya Bank nominated Mr Arun Thiagarajan to succeed Mr K.R. Ramamoorthy as chairman of the board. Mr Thiagarajan was selected for his vast international experience across strategic planning, economics and finance, technology and systems.

As of January 2013, ING Group announced plans to divest itself of its Indian insurance and investment management businesses through the sale of its 26% interest in ING Vysya Life Insurance Company Ltd. to its joint venture partner Exide Industries Ltd.

== Current operations ==
ING Vysya Bank has competed in the banking/financial services and insurance markets for over 80 years and currently serves over two million Indian consumers. The bank markets an entire range of financial products and services, organised under three strategic lines of business: retail, private and wholesale banking.

=== Retail banking ===
With 547 branches and 10 counters, 28 satellite offices and 470 ATM's nationwide, ING Vysya's retail operation offers cheque accounts, savings deposits/CD's, retail wealth management services, consumer loans, agricultural/rural banking and retail life insurance products. The bank has rapidly expanded its distribution footprint and has created a national brand presence through several marketing campaigns.

=== Private banking ===
ING Vysya's private bank operates on an advisory-driven model. Specialised market research remains the bank's emphasis for the introduction of new tailored products to serve the high-end private banking segment.

=== Corporate/wholesale banking ===
The wholesale banking business provides corporate clients in India a range of commercial, transactional and electronic banking products. The bank offers products including working capital finance, trade and transactional services, foreign exchange, term loans and cash management services. The wholesale banking business comprises four business sub-segments and multiple product offerings. The business segments Corporate and Investment Banking, Emerging Corporates, Banking and Financial Institutions and financial markets.

=== Agriculture and rural banking ===
Agriculture and Rural Banking deals with all business related to agriculture and allied activities, Gold Loans, loans to SHGs and lending to government-sponsored schemes. Working Capital and Agriculture Term Loans for poultry, dairy, cold storage units etc. are also being offered to cater diverse needs of the farming community. The bank has accelerated retail agricultural lending at a few places in North India and Central India especially in Rajasthan, Uttarakhand, Maharashtra, Gujarat and Madhya Pradesh.

== See also ==
- East India Company (disambiguation)
- ING Group
- Indian banking
