= Last Man in Tower =

2011 novel by Aravind Adiga

- First edition (India)
- Author: Aravind Adiga
- Language: English
- Genre: Fictional
- Publisher: Fourth Estate (India); Atlantic Books (UK); Knopf (US)
- Publication date: 2011
- Publication place: India
- Media type: Royal (hardback)
- Pages: 432
- ISBN: 978-93-5029-084-2

Last Man in Tower is a 2011 novel by Indian writer Aravind Adiga. Published by HarperCollins India, it was the third published book and second published novel by Adiga. It tells the story of a struggle for a slice of shining Mumbai real estate. The protagonist of the novel is a retired schoolteacher named Yogesh A. Murthy, who is affectionately known as Masterji.

A prominent builder offers to buy out the entire apartment block. All of the occupants agree, except for Masterji. This creates a problem for the builder and the other residents.

== Adaptation ==
The novel was adapted in the 2026 Hindi drama film Last Man in Tower directed by Ben Rekhi starring Manoj Bajpayee, Boman Irani and Divya Dutta in the lead roles.
