= Pragathi Gramin Bank =

Defuncted Indian regional bank

- Company type: Bank
- Industry: Financial services
- Predecessor: Sahyadri, Chitradurga, Tungabhadra and Kolar Gramin Banks
- Founded: 12 September 2005; 20 years ago
- Defunct: 23 August 2013 amalgamated with Karnataka Gramin Bank
- Fate: Merged
- Successor: Pragathi Krishna Gramin Bank
- Headquarters: Ballari, India
- Number of locations: Raichur, Koppal, Bellary, Vijayanagara, Chitradurga, Davanagere, Shimoga, Kolar and Chikkaballapura
- Area served: Karnataka
- Products: Deposits, Personal Banking Schemes, C & I Banking Schemes, Agri Banking Schemes, SME Banking Schemes
- Services: Loans, Deposits, ATM Services, National Electronic Fund Transfer (NEFT), Debit Card
- Parent: Canara Bank (35%)
- Website: pragathigrameenabank.com or pragathigraminabank.com or pragatigraminbank.com

Pragathi Gramin Bank was an Indian Regional Rural Bank (RRB) established under the Regional Rural Banks' Act 1976. The bank was permitted to carry out all kinds of banking business and provided banking services to individuals and small businesses.

It was a Scheduled Bank jointly owned by the Government of India, Canara Bank and the Government of Karnataka (share capital contributed in the ratio of 50:35:15 respectively). The bank operated in nine districts of Karnataka, with its Head Office in Ballari.

In 2023, the bank was merged with Krishna Grameena Bank to form Pragathi Krishna Gramin Bank, which was later merged to form Karnataka Gramin Bank.

== History ==
=== Year - event ===
- 1976 - Tungabhadra Gramin Bank established on 25 Jan
- 2005 - Pragathi Gramin Bank formed on 12 Sep
- 2013 - The Bank was amalgamated with Krishna Grameena Bank to form Pragathi Krishna Gramin Bank, on 23 August (Headquartered at Ballari).

On 23 August 2013, Pragathi Krishna Gramin Bank, with its Head Office in Ballari, was formed through the amalgamation of two RRBs: Canara Bank-sponsored Pragathi Gramin Bank (Headquartered in Ballari) and the erstwhile State Bank of India-sponsored Krishna Grameena Bank (Headquartered in Kalaburagi). The bank was formed as per gazette Notification of Government of India No. F1/5/2011- RRB (Karnataka) dated 23 August 2013.

== See also ==
- Indian banking
- List of banks in India
- Kaveri Grameena Bank
- Karnataka Gramin Bank
