= Haraamkhor =

- Theatrical release poster
- Directed by: Shlok Sharma
- Written by: Shlok Sharma
- Produced by: Guneet Monga; Anurag Kashyap; Feroze Alameer; Achin Jain
- Starring: Nawazuddin Siddiqui; Shweta Tripathi
- Cinematography: Siddharth Diwan
- Edited by: Kratika Adhikari; Charu Shree Roy
- Music by: Songs: Jasleen Royal; Background Score: Vishal Khurana; Karan Gour
- Production companies: Sikhya Entertainment; Khusro Films
- Distributed by: Indian Film Studios
- Release dates: May 2015 (NYIFF); 13 January 2017
- Running time: 92 minutes
- Country: India
- Language: Hindi
- Budget: ₹22.50 million
- Box office: ₹22.70 million

Haraamkhor (transl. Scoundrel) is a 2015 Indian Hindi-language romantic black comedy film directed by Shlok Sharma. It stars Nawazuddin Siddiqui and Shweta Tripathi. Jasleen Royal was the film's music composer. The film was shot in just 16 days.

In April 2017, an FIR was registered against director Shlok Sharma on a complaint by Balbharati, Maharashtra's textbook bureau, objecting to striking similarities between its logo and promotion scenes from Haraamkhor.

Haraamkhor premiered at the 21st annual New York Indian Film Festival (NYIFF) and the Indian Film Festival of Los Angeles (IFFLA). Nawazuddin Siddiqui received the Best Actor award at the NYIFF.

== Plot ==
Shyam is a schoolteacher in a village. Sandhya and her friends, Mintu and Kamal, are some of his students. Kamal has a crush on Sandhya but she is not interested. After school, Shyam visits Sandhya's home to have some documents notarized by her father, who is a local police inspector. Sandhya and Shyam come closer. Sandhya takes care of her father when he arrives home drunk. She follows him to a party when he lies to her about going on a work trip. On her way home, Sandhya falls, injures her knee, and goes to Shyam's house, where his wife, Sunita, cares for her and lets her stay with them for the night. Sandhya spies on Shyam and Sunita having sex. While she is asleep, Shyam tries to talk to Sandhya and teases her, but she is angry with him.

The next day, Sandhya rebukes Shyam for lying to her about how he and his wife did not have sexual relations. It is revealed that Sandhya's mom abandoned her as a child, and her father has started dating someone new but was waiting for the right time to tell her. Shyam fixes an old moped (Luna) at Sandhya's home. They meet in secret and start having an affair. Kamal is jealous, and Mintu wants to help him.

One month later, Sandhya tells Shyam that she missed her period, so they make a secret trip to the city. At the women's clinic, Sandhya is recognized by her father's girlfriend, who keeps her secret. Sandhya is not pregnant, and she and Shyam share a laugh about it. When they return to their village, Shyam tells Sandhya that they should stop seeing each other and keep their relationship strictly a student-teacher one.

Rumours reveal their secret anyway, and Sunita threatens to leave Shyam. Shyam scolds and hits Sandhya for being obvious. Meanwhile, Mintu and Kamal wreak havoc in Shyam's empty home. Sunita comes back home, and Shyam becomes suspicious of the kids breaking and entering his home when he sees them with some of his belongings. Shyam catches hold of Mintu and kills him by asphyxiation, while Kamal manages to escape. As he saw Shyam suffocating Mintu to death, he returned with a rock and hit Shyam with it, killing him in the process. The casting of the film was handled by Mukesh Chhabra as casting director and Vicky Kisan Mourya as casting associate.

== Cast ==
- Nawazuddin Siddiqui as Shyam Tekchand, School Master
- Shweta Tripathi as Sandhya, student
- Trimala Adhikari as Sunita, Shyam's wife
- Mohammad Samad as Mintu, Sandhya’s classmate
- Irfan Khan as Kamal, Sandhya’s classmate
- Harish Khanna as Raghuvir Singh, police inspector, Sandhya's father
- Shreya Shah as Neelu, Sandhya's father's girlfriend
- Hanif as Shaktimaan
- Jhanvi Trivedi as Archana
- Nandini Khatri as Bindiya
- Puja Banerjee as Gynaecologist

== Soundtrack ==
The soundtrack of Haraamkhor consists of just one song, "Kidre Jaawan", which was composed by Jasleen Royal and the lyrics of which were written by Aditya Sharma.

== Critical reception ==
Rajeev Masand of News18 praised the performances of the actors saying that, "the film benefits enormously from the convincing performances at its heart. Shweta Tripathi is in good form as the confused, ignored young teenager who can’t help making all the wrong choices. But it’s Nawazuddin Siddiqui whose brilliant, mostly understated portrayal of a violent predator is the film’s biggest strength." and gave the film a rating of 3 out of 5. Rohit Vats of Hindustan Times praised the film saying that, "Brave and original, Haraamkhor walks the razor’s edge. One tiny mistake, and it could have been pronounced morally twisted. However, Haraamkhor is one film you just shouldn’t miss, even if it’s just to see how Hindi cinema is exploring new themes with finesse." and gave the film a rating of 4.5 out of 5. Mayank Bharara of ShowBiz-BizAsia rated the film 7 out of 10 stars. Bharara praised the actors' performances as engaging but noted that the plot "has a tendency to get monotonous."
