= Parul Gulati =

Indian actress

- Born: Rohtak, Haryana, India
- Occupations: Actress and Entrepreneur
- Years active: 2010–present

Parul Gulati is an Indian actress, entrepreneur and model who has appeared in several TV shows and Punjabi films. She is the CEO and founder of her hair extensions brand ‘Nish Hair’.

In (2017) Gulati appeared in the TV series P.O.W. - Bandi Yuddh Ke, and Haq Se (2018) Web Series - An adaptation of Little Women , Gulati plays "Jo March". In (2018), Gulati starred in Netflix production Selection Day is an Indian Netflix Original based on Aravind Adiga's 2016 novel of the same name . Girls Hostel (2018–19)for The Viral Fever Girliyapa .

She debuted in TV serial, Yeh Pyar Na Hoga Kum, in which she played the role of Bittan, the younger sister of Leher played by Bollywood actress Yami Gautam. She also appeared in Kis Kis Ko Pyaar Karoon 2, alongside Kapil Sharma.

In addition to acting in films, Gulati has endorsed multiple brands and products. She has her own line of Human Hair Extensions by the name of Nishhair.

== Personal life ==
Gulati was born in Rohtak, Haryana. Gulati has one brother. In 2010, while she was class 12, she decided to move to Mumbai with her mother after being selected for a television show, which marked the starting point of her career.

== Career ==
=== 2010–2016: Acting and film debut ===
She was spotted by the makers of a TV show on Facebook. They invited her to Mumbai for an audition and was cast in a supporting role in Yeh Pyaar Na Hoga kam. Later in 2012, she acted in Burrraahh, in which she played Rose. After Burrraahh, Gulati took a year's break and finished her course at RADA, a drama school in London and also did some theatre in Mumbai. Her second film was Romeo Ranjha in 2014.

In 2016, she appeared in director Vinnil Markan's film Zorawar, as Jasleen, opposite to Yo Yo Honey Singh.

=== 2017–present: Television debut ===
After a decently successful stint in Punjabi films, Gulati made her television debut with TV series, P.O.W. - Bandi Yuddh Ke for Star Plus which was directed by Nikkhil Advani. She played the role of a Pakistani girl Afreen, who is married to a P.O.W, Parul got lot of praise and appreciation for her portrayal of the Pakistani Urdu speaking girl.

In 2018, she appeared in a web series Haq Se, directed by Ken Ghosh. She played the role of journalist Jannat Mirza, who is fighting for justice and to uphold the dignity of women in the state of Kashmir. This web series is based on the classic novel Little Women by Louisa May Alcott into modern day tale of Kashmir and Parul has played Jo March.

In 2018, Gulati starred in Netflix series Selection Day based on Aravind Adiga's 2016 novel of the same name and Girls Hostel for The Viral Fever. In 2025, Gulati appeared in Hindi film Kis Kisko Pyaar Karoon 2 as Jenny, alongside Kapil Sharma.

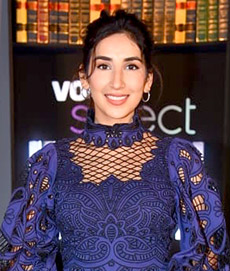
Gulati in 2021

== Filmography ==
Key
†	Denotes films that have not yet been released

=== Films ===
Year	Film	Character name	Language	Notes
2013	Burraahh	Rose	Punjabi	Punjabi film debut
2014	Romeo Ranjha	Preet	Punjabi	
2016	Zorawar	Jasleen	Punjabi	
2016	Nee Jathaleka	Shirley	Telugu	Telugu film debut
2024	Silence 2: The Night Owl Bar Shootout	Aarti	Hindi	Hindi film debut
2025	Kis Kisko Pyaar Karoon 2	Jenny	Hindi	
2026	Tu Yaa Main	Layla	Hindi	

=== Television ===
Year	Title	Role	Notes
2010	Kitani Mohabbat Hai (season 2)	Gauri Ahluwalia	
2010	Yeh Pyar Na Hoga Kam	Bittan	
2017	P.O.W. - Bandi Yuddh Ke	Afreen	
2018	Haq Se	Jannat Mirza	Web series
2018–2022	Girls Hostel	Zahira Ali	Web series
2018	Selection Day	Monica Tandon	
2019–2021	Hey Prabhu!	Arunima	Web series
2020	Second Hand	Beauty	Short film
2020	The Raikar Case	Etasha Naik Raikar	Web series
2020	Illegal - Justice, Out of Order	Devika	Web series
2020	Your Honor	Ruma Pathak	Web series
2023	Shark Tank India (season 2)	Herself	To pitch her Hair Extension brand 'Nish Hair'
2023	Made in Heaven (season 2)	Amber	Web series
2026	The Traitors India season 2	Contestant	Reality show

== See also ==
- List of Indian film actresses
