= Girls Hostel =

Indian comedy-drama web series

- Genre: Comedy, drama
- Created by: Shreyasi Sharma
- Directed by: Hanish D Kalia
- Starring: Ahsaas Channa; Srishti Shrivastava; Parul Gulati; Simran Natekar; Shreya Mehta; Tanvi Lehr Sonigra
- No. of seasons: 3
- No. of episodes: 15

Production
- Running time: 19–42 minutes

Original release
- Network: SonyLIV
- Release: 8 December 2018 – 25 November 2022

Girls Hostel is an Indian comedy-drama web series that originally premiered on Sony LIV on 8 December 2018. The show revolves around the lives of girls residing in a hostel at a medical institute, highlighting the challenges they face in obtaining basic amenities and fostering inclusivity. It is created by Shreyasi Sharma and directed by Hanish D Kalia.

== Cast ==
- Ahsaas Channa as Richa
- Srishti Shrivastava as Anandi Joshi aka Jo
- Parul Gulati as Zahira Ali
- Simran Natekar as Mili
- Shreya Mehta as Ramya Mantri
- Tanvi Lehr Sonigra as Vipassana
- Gagan Arora as Aarav
- Khushbu Baid as Palak
- Trupti Khamkar as Warden
- Jayati Bhatia as Dr. Sarla Desai
- Durin Das as Twitter

== Episodes ==
Series	Episodes	Originally released	
Series	Episodes	First released	Last released
1	5	8 December 2018	1 March 2019
2	5	19 February 2021	
3	5	25 November 2022	

=== Season 1 (2018–19) ===
No. overall	No. in season	Title	Original release date
1	1	"The Bra Chor"	8 December 2018
2	2	"The Fashion Showdown"	21 December 2018
3	3	"The Midnight Plan"	5 January 2019
4	4	"The Best Of Friends"	22 February 2019
5	5	"The Worst Of Enemies"	1 March 2019

=== Season 2 (2021) ===
No. overall	No. in season	Title	Original release date
6	1	"The Uprising"	19 February 2021
7	2	"The Intrusion"	19 February 2021
8	3	"The Mistake"	19 February 2021
9	4	"The Strategy"	19 February 2021
10	5	"The End-Game"	19 February 2021

=== Season 3 (2022) ===
No. overall	No. in season	Title	Original release date
11	1	"Expectations"	25 November 2022
12	2	"Dilemma"	25 November 2022
13	3	"Hustle"	25 November 2022
14	4	"Frenemies"	25 November 2022
15	5	"Explosion"	25 November 2022

== Reception ==
Archika Khurana of The Times of India gave season 1, a rating of 3 out of 5 stars and wrote "All said, it’s a light-hearted binge-watch series with a motto of ‘why can’t girls have all the fun’." Season 2 received 3.5 stars out of 5 and Khurana wrote "This season tackles some serious issues—right from water crises management to eve-teasing—which are depicted in a lighter manner."

Girls Hostel 3.0 received mixed reviews from viewers and critics. Some appreciated the relatable portrayal of hostel life and the exploration of relevant issues such as gender fluidity, expectations from parents, and anxiety at a young age. The performances of the main cast members, including Ahsaas Channa, Srishti Shrivastava, and Parul Gulati, were praised for their natural and convincing portrayal of student life. The remaining cast members play their respective roles as per the script, with some characters bordering on caricatures. While the series attempts to delve into relevant themes, some subplots and conflicts are resolved too quickly, resulting in an incomplete and purposeless narrative. Furthermore, the absence of family backgrounds for the characters, which were emphasized in previous seasons, raises questions about the show's consistency and the audience's investment in the characters' personal lives.

Sukanya Saha of Dainik Jagran in his review wrote "Dull, Unimaginative, And Just Not Worth Your Time."

Shubham Kulkarni of Koimoi wrote "TVF Spark Goes Missing From A Show That Is Confused About Its Own Intent."
