= Mohammad Samad =

Indian actor

- Born: 7 May 2000 (age 26); Roorkee, Uttarakhand, India
- Occupation: Actor
- Years active: 2008–present
- Known for: Chhichhore (2019 film); Haraamkhor (2015 film); Tumbbad (2018 film); Gattu (2012 film)

Mohammad Samad (born 7 May 2000) is an Indian actor, who works predominantly in Hindi films, including Gattu (2012), Haraamkhor (2015), Tumbbad (2018) and Chhichhore (2019). He played the lead role of Manju Kumar in the Netflix series Selection Day.

== Early life ==
Mohammad Samad was born in Roorkee, Uttarakhand where his parents ran a grocery store. He has one elder brother and four elder sisters. He did his schooling from St. Gabriel's Academy, Roorkee.

== Career ==
His first breakthrough performance was in the movie Gattu where he played the titular lead role for which he won the Best Child Actor Award at the 12th New York Indian Film Festival. He has acted in films like Haraamkhor and Tumbbad. In 2018, he played the lead role in the web series Selection Day on Netflix. In the 2019 film Chhichhore, he played the role of the teenage son of the characters played by lead actors Sushant Singh Rajput and Shraddha Kapoor.

== Filmography ==
Year	Title	Role	Notes
2008	Firaaq	Mohsin	
2012	Gattu	Gattu	
2017	Haraamkhor	Mintu	
2018	Tumbbad	Pandurang	
2019	Chhichhore	Raghav	
2024	Gaami	CT-333	Debut in Telugu cinema
2024	Malhar	Jatin	
2025	Mayasabha – The Hall of Illusion	Vasu	
2027	Tumbbad 2	Pandurang	Filming

=== Streaming television ===
Year	Title	Role	Channel
2018	Selection Day	Manju Kumar	Netflix
2021	Sabka Sai	Young Sai Baba	MX Player
2024	Zindaginama	Raju	SonyLIV
TBA	Ramgarh 98	Batti	TBA
