= Aravind Adiga =

Indian journalist and author

- Born: 23 October 1974 (age 52); Madras (now Chennai), Tamil Nadu, India
- Education: Columbia University; Magdalen College, Oxford
- Occupation: Writer
- Writing career
- Genres: Novel and short story
- Notable works: The White Tiger, Last Man in Tower, Selection Day
- Notable awards: 2008 Man Booker Prize (The White Tiger)
- Website: www.aravindadiga.com

Aravind Adiga (born 23 October 1974) is an Indian-born Australian writer and journalist. His debut novel, The White Tiger, won the 2008 Man Booker Prize.

== Early life and education ==
Aravind Adiga was born in Madras (now Chennai), the capital of Tamil Nadu, on 23 October 1974. His parents Usha Adiga and Dr. K. Madhava Adiga hailed from Mangalore, Karnataka. His paternal grandfather was K. Suryanarayana Adiga, former chairman of Karnataka Bank, and maternal great-grandfather, U. Rama Rao, was a popular medical practitioner and politician from Madras.

Adiga grew up in Mangalore and studied at Canara High School and later at St. Aloysius College, Mangaluru, where he completed his SSLC in 1990.

After emigrating to Sydney with his family, Aravind studied at James Ruse Agricultural High School. He later studied English literature at Columbia College of Columbia University, in New York City, under Simon Schama, and graduated as salutatorian in 1997. He also studied at Magdalen College, Oxford, where one of his tutors was Hermione Lee.

== Career ==
=== Journalism ===
Aravind Adiga began his journalism career as an intern at the Financial Times. With pieces published in Money and Time, he covered the stock market and investment.

In 2003, he interviewed future US President Donald Trump. Later that year, he moved from New York to New Delhi to be South Asia correspondent for Time. In a 2017 interview, he explained: “Being a journalist afforded me a path to go back to India."

Three years later, he became a freelance writer and moved to Mumbai.

His review of previous Booker Prize winner, Oscar and Lucinda, appeared in The Second Circle, an online literary review.

=== The White Tiger ===
Soon after resigning from his position at Time, Adiga started writing his debut novel, The White Tiger. Published in March 2008, the book won the Booker Prize later that year. He is the fourth Indian-born author to win the prize, after Salman Rushdie, Arundhati Roy, and Kiran Desai. Propelled mainly by the Booker Prize win, The White Tiger's Indian hardcover edition sold more than 200,000 copies.

The book received critical acclaim. USA Today called it "one of the most powerful books I've read in decades", comparing it to Richard Wright's Native Son and Ralph Ellison's Invisible Man. The Washington Post called it: "[a] blistering description of the inner workings of India's corrupt upper class [...] fresh, funny, different."

Shortly after Adiga won the Booker Prize, it was alleged that he had sacked the agent who secured his contract with Atlantic Books at the 2007 London Book Fair. Adiga denied this claim.

In April 2009, it was announced that the novel would be adapted into a feature film, which was later released on Netflix in 2021.

=== Other works ===
Adiga's second book, Between the Assassinations, is a short story collection set in a fictional coastal town in India. It was released in India in November 2008 and in the US and UK in mid-2009.

His third book, Last Man in Tower, was published in the US in September 2011. His next novel, Selection Day, was published in the US in January 2017.

Amnesty, published in February 2020, is a novel about an undocumented Sri Lankan immigrant living in Australia. It was shortlisted for the 2021 Miles Franklin Award.

== Bibliography ==
=== Novels ===
- The White Tiger: A Novel. Atlantic Books, Ltd (UK), Free Press (US), 2008 ISBN 9781416562603
- Between the Assassinations. Picador (IND), 2008
- Last Man in Tower. Fourth Estate (IND), 2011 ISBN 9789350290842
- Selection Day. HarperCollins India (IND), (Scribner) 2016 ISBN 9781501150838
- Amnesty. Picador, Pan Macmillan, 2020 ISBN 9781982127244

=== Short stories ===
- "The Sultan's Battery" (The Guardian, 18 October 2008, online text)
- "Smack" (The Sunday Times, 16 November 2008, online text)
- "Last Christmas in Bandra" (The Times, 19 December 2008, online text)
- "The Elephant" (The New Yorker, 26 January 2009, online text)

=== Selected articles ===
- "The Death of the Indian Dream" (Time, 30 July 2008, archived text)
- "Bachelor Bigotry" (The Guardian, 28 August 2008, online text)
