= Canara High School =

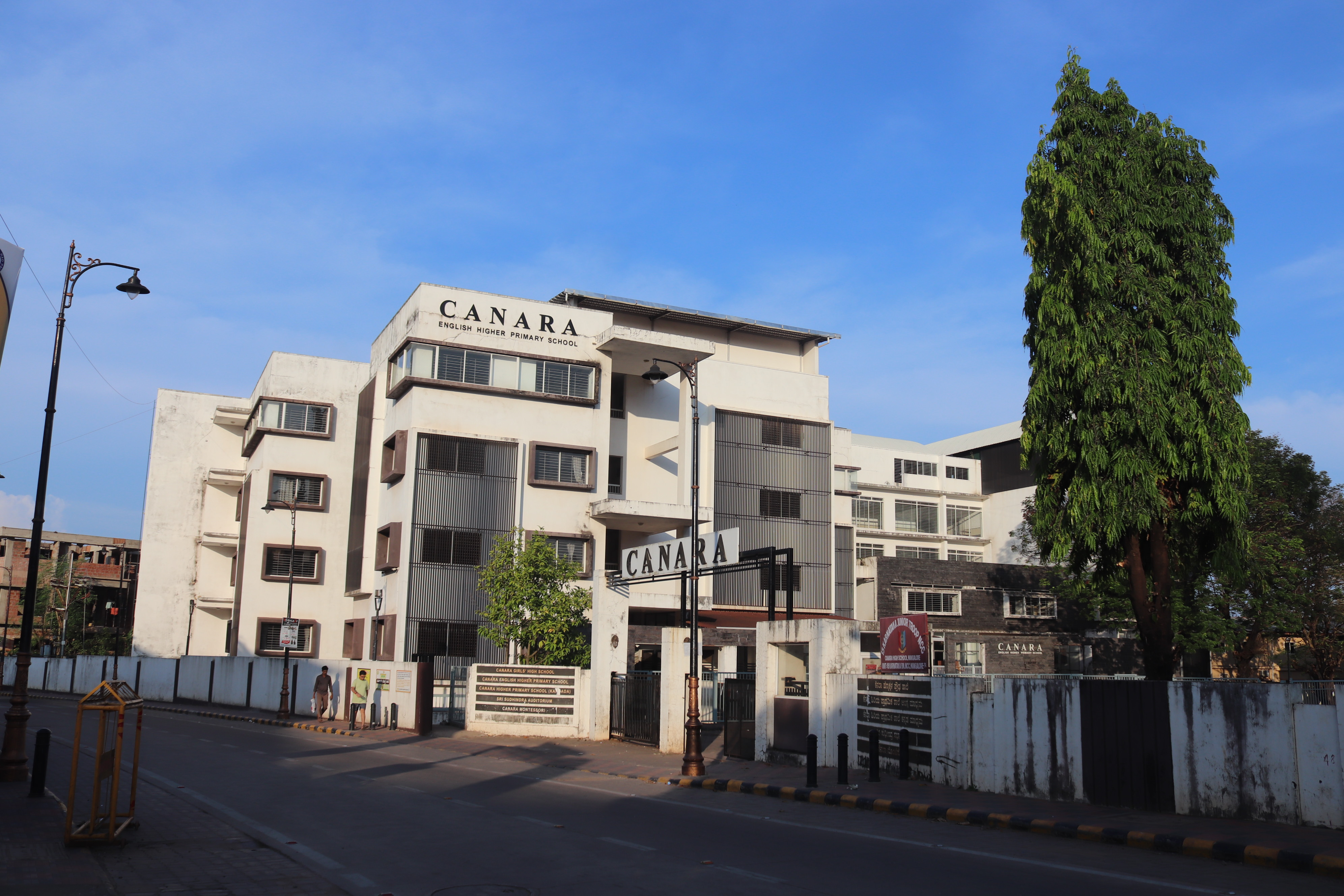

Location
- Ammembal Subba Rao Pai Road; Kodialbail; Mangaluru, Karnataka, 575003; India; 12.874376°N 74.838757°E

Information
- Established: 1891; 135 years ago
- Founder: Ammembal Subba Rao Pai
- School district: Dakshina Kannada
- President: D. Vasudeva Kamath
- Headmistress: Smt.arunakumari
- Grades: 8–10
- Yearbook: kamadhenu
- Affiliation: Secondary School Leaving Certificate
- Alumni: 10,000+
- Secretary: Mr. M. Ranganath Bhat
- Correspondent: Mr. Gopalkrishna Shenoy
- Treasurer: Mr. P. Gopalakrishna Shenoy
- Joint Secretary: Mr. Maroor Sudhir Pai
- Website: www.canara.ac.in

Canara High School is an educational institution in Mangaluru which was founded by Ammembal Subba Rao Pai in 1891. He is also popular as the founder of Canara Bank, now a major nationalized bank in India. Since 1945, when a sister school was opened at Urwa, this school has been called Canara High School (urwa). In 2009, a CBSE school was inaugurated on this campus, offering classes from 1st to 10th standard. It had acquired Vikas institutions in Mangalore in 2022

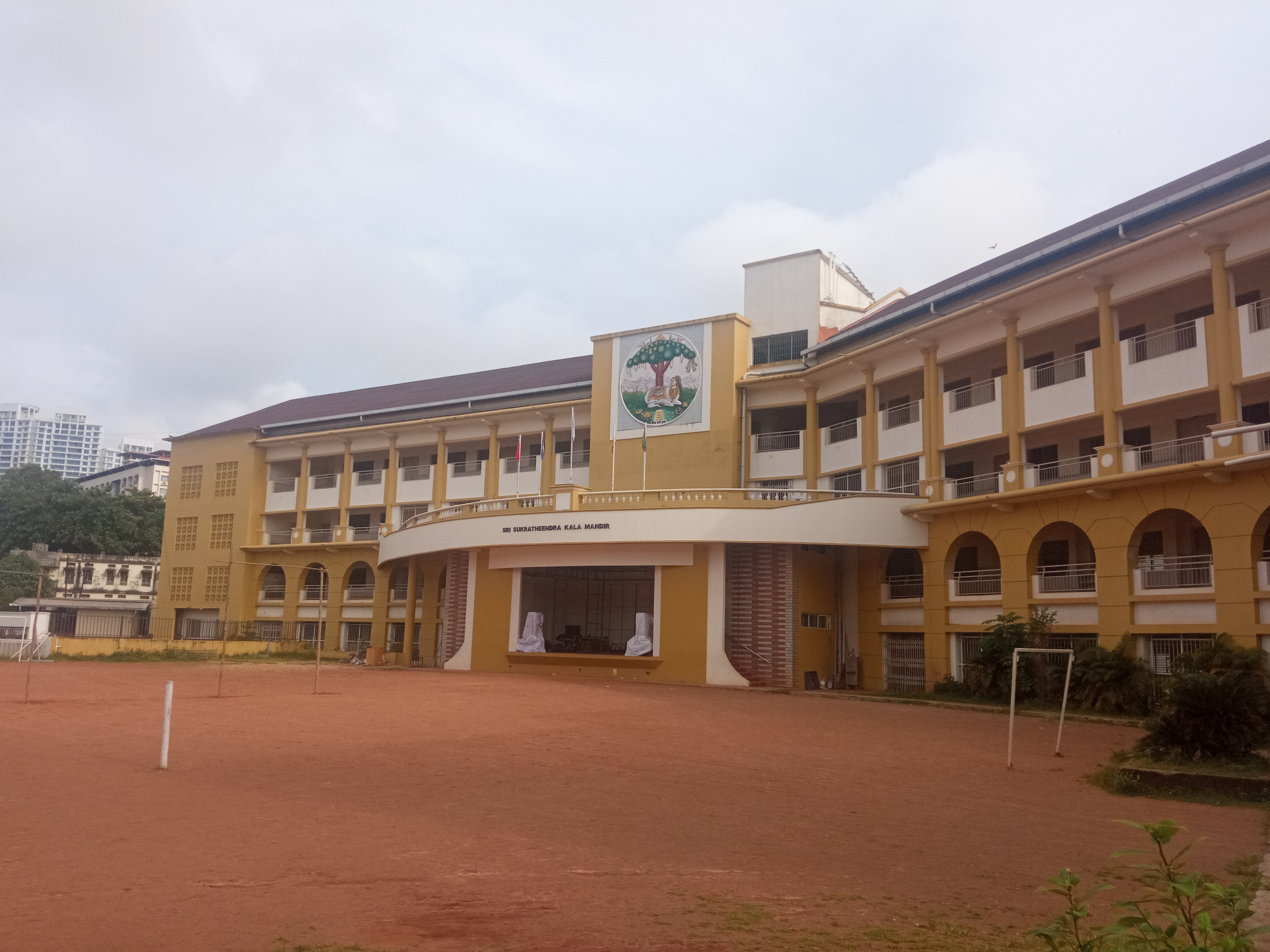
Canara CBSE

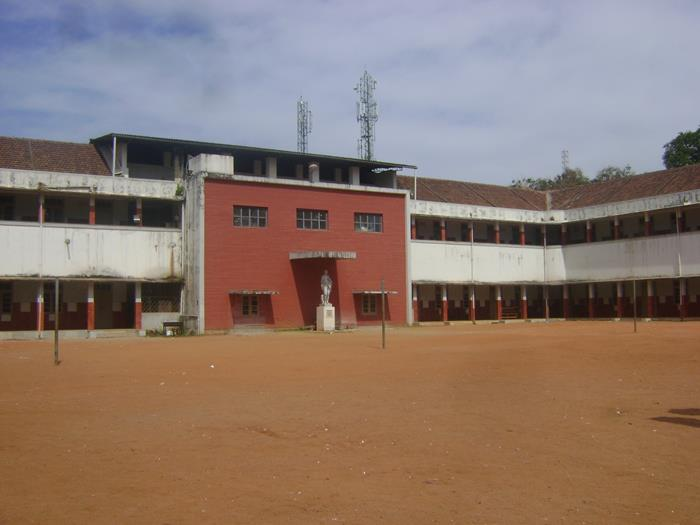
Main Building

Urwa Building

== History ==
The school was started in a rental building opposite the Kodialbail Chapel. A group of four B.A. graduates— Sriyuths U. Srinivas Rao, B. Padmanabha Baliga, B. Vaman Baliga and Arkal Vasudev Rao—with a mission to educate the Gowda Saraswat Brahmin community in Mangalore were the first teachers and proprietors. In 1923, the Canara High school Association was registered under the Indian Societies Registration Act and took over the management of the school. It has been running the school ever since and has been expanding its presence in the education sector of Mangalore. It was in Canara High School, where the first generation of the state-level leader of the RSS were trained.

== Activities ==
Canara High School has classes for 8th standard to 10th standard in Kannada and English. The school supports the midday meal scheme, wherein deserving students are offered afternoon lunch at school to reduce the drop-out rates. Being a Konkani linguistic minority school, optional Konkani classes and exams are conducted by the faculty on a yearly basis.

Extra-curricular activities include a painting club, quiz club, Sanskrit club and a local National Cadet Corps chapter, through which students gain leadership qualities and get motivated to serve in the Armed Forces. For students with a literary bend of mind, the Newspaper in Education program affords an opportunity to write short stories and artwork for local newspapers, which appear usually in the Saturday edition. With intentions to modernize infrastructure, an electronic polling system was introduced from 2005-06 onwards for election of School Parliament. A new computer lab has been recently opened up.

== Facilities ==
=== T V Raman Pai Hall ===
This multi-purpose auditorium was constructed in 2002, in memory of an alumnus, Mr. T.V. Raman Pai. Most of the annual school functions are conducted here, and it generates additional income by renting out for external events.

=== ASRP Fund and Book Bank ===
A memorial fund for financially assisting the students belonging to the Konkani community through education loans and scholarships was set up in 1913. The book bank distributes books on a per-semester basis for free to members and alumni of the school.
