= Kaveri Grameena Bank =

Defuncted Indian regional bank

- Type: Bank
- Industry: Banking, Insurance, Capital Markets and allied industries
- Predecessor: Cauvery grameena bank, Cauvery Kalpatharu Grameena Bank, Chikmagalur Kodagu Grameena Bank and Vishvesvaraya Grameena Bank
- Founded: 1 November 2012; 13 years ago
- Defunct: 31 March 2019 merged with newly formed Karnataka Gramin Bank
- Successor: Karnataka Gramin Bank
- Headquarters: Mysore
- Number of locations: 502 Branches in 10 Districts of South Karnataka; Head Office: Mysore
- Area served: Karnataka
- Key people: Chairman: Mr Bhuvanendra Takoor; General Manager (Administration): Bhaskar Rao P
- Products: Deposits, Personal Banking Schemes, C & I Banking Schemes, Agri Banking Schemes, SME Banking Schemes
- Services: Loans, Deposits, ATM Services, National Electronic Fund Transfer (NEFT), Internet Banking, Mobile Banking, Aadhaar Enabled Payment System, Debit Card
- Total assets
- Number of employees: 1797 (as of 31 March 2016)
- Parent: State Bank of India (35%)
- Website: karnatakagraminbank.com

Kaveri Grameena Bank was a Regional Rural Bank established under Regional Rural Banks' Act 1976, was a Scheduled Bank jointly owned by Government of India, State Bank of India (formerly by State Bank of Mysore) and Government of Karnataka (share capital contributed in the ratio of 50 :35:15 respectively), permitted to carry all kinds of banking business. The Bank was operating in 22 Districts of South Karnataka, having its Head Office at Bellary City with Nine Regional Offices at Mysuru, Mandya, Bengaluru, Tumakuru, Hassan, Chamarajanagar, Madikeri, Chikmagulur and Ramanagara etc.

The Bank was started as Cauvery Grameena bank and served Mysore, Hassan and Chamarajanagar districts. The bank was renamed as Kaveri Grameena Bank on 1 November 2012 (Sponsored by State Bank of Mysore) by Amalgamation of Cauvery Kalpatharu Grameena Bank, Chikmagalur Kodagu Grameena Bank and Vishvesvaraya Grameena Bank, Sponsored by State Bank of Mysore, Corporation Bank and Vijaya Bank respectively.

The Headquarters of Kaveri Grameena Bank was located at Vijayanagar Second Stage, Mysore, which is now converted as IT Centre of Karnataka Gramin Bank, post merger.

== History ==
Year - event

- 2012 - The Bank was established as 'Kaveri Grameena Bank', on 1 November in South Karnataka (Headquartered at Mysuru).
- 2014 - Bank has recorded a growth rate of 36.52 per cent during 13–14.
- 2014 - Bank launches financial inclusion scheme.
- 2014 - Bank opens four branches in Mandya district.
- 2015 - The Kaveri Grameena Bank has enrolled over 48,000 subscribers for the PMSBY in Mysore.
- 2015 - Kaveri Grameena Bank has enrolled 1,01,104 subscribers to the insurance schemes underlining the popularity of the social security schemes in rural areas.
- 2015 - The Kaveri Grameena Bank plans to extend internet and mobile banking services to its customers.
- 2019 - The Kaveri Grameena bank amalgamated with Pragathi Krishna Gramin Bank to form Karnataka Gramin bank.

== See also ==
- Indian banking
- List of banks in India
- Pragathi Gramin Bank
- Karnataka Gramin Bank
