= The White Tiger (Adiga novel) =

2008 novel by Arvind Adiga

- Author: Aravind Adiga
- Language: English
- Genre: Picaresque novel
- Published: 2008 Atlantic Books (UK); 2008 HarperCollins (India)
- Publication place: India
- Media type: Print (hardback)
- Pages: 318
- ISBN: 1-4165-6259-1
- OCLC: 166373034
- Dewey Decimal: 823/.92 22
- LC Class: PR9619.4.A35 W47 2008

The White Tiger is a 2008 picaresque novel by Indian author Aravind Adiga. The novel provides a darkly humorous perspective of India's class struggle in a globalized world as told through a retrospective narration from Balram Halwai, a village boy. The novel examines modern issues of India's caste system, corruption, and poverty. It was the recipient of the 2008 Booker Prize.

The novel has been well-received, making the New York Times bestseller list in addition to winning the Booker Prize. Aravind Adiga, 33 at the time, was the second youngest writer as well as the fourth debut writer to win the prize. Adiga says his novel "attempt[s] to catch the voice of the men you meet as you travel through India – the voice of the colossal underclass." According to Adiga, the exigence for The White Tiger was to capture the unspoken voice of people from "the Darkness" – the impoverished areas of rural India, and he "wanted to do so without sentimentality or portraying them as mirthless humorless weaklings as they are usually."

== Plot ==
Balram Halwai narrates his life in a letter, written in seven consecutive nights and addressed to the Chinese Premier, Wen Jiabao. In his letter, Balram explains how he, the son of a rickshaw puller, escaped a life of servitude to become a successful businessman, describing himself as an entrepreneur.

Balram was born in a rural village in Gaya district, where he lived with his grandmother, parents, brother and extended family. He is a smart child but is forced to leave school in order to help pay for his cousin's dowry and begins to work in a teashop with his brother in Dhanbad. While working there he learns about India's government and economy from the customers' conversations. Balram describes himself as a bad servant but a good listener and decides to become a driver.

After learning how to drive, Balram finds a job driving Ashok, the son of one of Laxmangarh's landlords. Starting as the secondary driver of a small car, he spies on the main driver and discovers he is secretly visiting mosques, making him Muslim; it is implied that Balram subsequently informs his employers to take over the main driver's job and car, a heavy-luxury described Honda City. He stops sending money back to his family and disrespects his grandmother during a trip back to his village. Balram moves to New Delhi with Ashok and his wife Pinky. Throughout their time in Delhi, Balram is exposed to extensive corruption, especially in the government. In Delhi, the contrast between the poor and the wealthy is made even more evident by their proximity to one another.

One night Pinky takes the wheel from Balram, while drunk, hits something in the road and drives away; the reader is left to assume that she has killed a child through contextual clues. Ashok's family puts pressure on Balram to confess that he had been driving alone. Ashok becomes increasingly involved in bribing government officials for the benefit of the family coal business. Balram then decides that killing Ashok will be the only way to escape India's Rooster Coop – Balram's metaphor for describing the oppression of India's poor, just as roosters in a coop at the market watch themselves get slaughtered one by one, but are unable or unwilling to break out of the cage. Similarly, Balram too is portrayed as being trapped in the metaphorical Rooster Coop: his family controls what he does and society dictates how he acts.

After killing Ashok by stabbing him with a broken bottle and stealing the large bribe Ashok was carrying with him, Balram moves to Bangalore, where he bribes the police in order to help start his own taxi business.

Just like Ashok, Balram pays off a family whose son one of his taxi drivers hit and killed. Balram explains that his own family was almost certainly killed by Ashok's relatives as retribution for his murder. At the end of the novel, Balram rationalizes his actions and considers that his freedom is worth the lives of his family and of Ashok. And thus ends the letter to Wen Jiabao, letting the reader think of the dark humour of the tale, as well as the idea of life as a trap introduced by the writer.

== Themes ==
=== Globalization ===
The White Tiger takes place in a time in which increased technology has led to world globalization, and India is no exception. In the 21st century, India has had one of the fastest growing economies. Specifically Americanization in India has played its role in the plot, since it provides an outlet for Balram to alter his caste. To satisfy Pinky's want for American culture, Ashok, Pinky, and Balram simply move to Gurgaon instead of going to back to America. Globalization has assisted in the creation of an American atmosphere in India. Ashok justifies this move by explaining "Today it’s the modernest suburb of Delhi-National Capital Region. American Express, Microsoft, all the big American companies have offices there. The main road is full of shopping malls—each mall has a cinema inside! So if Pinky Madam missed America, this was the best place to bring her".

Ashok is even convinced India is surpassing the US, "There are so many more things I could do here than in New York now...The way things are changing in India now, this place is going to be like America in ten years". Balram is noticing the rapid growth as well. From the beginning of his story he knows that in order to rise above his caste he should become an entrepreneur. Although his taxi service is not an international business, Balram plans to keep up with the pace of globalization and change his trade when need be. "I‘m always a man who sees 'tomorrow' when others see 'today.'" Balram's recognition of the increasing competition resulting from globalization contributes to his corruption.

=== Individualism ===
Throughout the book, there are references to show how Balram is very different from his home environment. He is referred to as the "white tiger" (which also happens to be the title of the book). A white tiger symbolizes power in East Asian cultures, such as in Vietnam. It is also a symbol for freedom and individuality. Balram is seen as different from those he grew up with. He is the one who got out of the "Darkness" and found his way into the "Light".

=== Freedom ===
Adiga describes "The White Tiger" as the story of a man's quest for freedom. Balram, the protagonist in the novel, works his way out of his low social caste (often referred to as "the Darkness") and overcomes the social obstacles that limited his family in the past. He describes this journey toward freedom in modern capitalist India as breaking free from a rooster coop. Towards the beginning of the novel, discussing those at the bottom of the social ladder, Balram cites a poem from the Muslim poet Iqbal: "They remain slaves because they can’t see what is beautiful in this world." Balram sees himself embodying the poem as one who sees and takes the world's beauty as he rises through the ranks of society and, in doing so, finds his freedom.

=== Social class/classism ===
The White Tiger portrays a modern day, capitalist Indian society with free market, free business, and severe economic division, with very negative attitudes towards the lower social castes.

Sections of the novel highlight discrimination against Muslims, India's largest religious minority. The protagonist's employers demand to know if he is Muslim. Later in the novel, a character is blackmailed and later sacked when he is outed by the protagonist for secretly practicing Islam.

The novel is based on the disparities of two worlds: darkness, inhabited by poor and underprivileged, and the lighted world, inhabited by zamindars, politicians, businessmen, etc. who shamelessly exploit those from darkness to grow their own grandeur. When Balram is asked his caste, he knows that it will cause a biased stance in his employer and determine the future of his employment. The White Tiger illustrates the enormous differences between Balram's lower caste and the higher caste in their lifestyles, habits, and standards of living, highlighting the socioeconomic discrimination in India's economic system that limits opportunity, social mobility, and health and creates divisions in Indian society.

== Reception ==
In 2020, Emma Lee-Potter of The Independent listed The White Tiger as one of the 12 best Indian novels.

The San Francisco Chronicle praised the writing in the novel, noting "'The White Tiger' contains passages of startling beauty - from reflections on the exquisite luxury of a chandelier in every room, to descriptions of skinny drivers huddled around fires fueled by plastic bags. Adiga never lets the precision of his language overshadow the realities at hand: No matter how potent his language one never loses sight of the men and women fighting impossible odds to survive."

== Film adaptation ==
On 5 April 2018, Ramin Bahrani was finalised to direct and write the film adaptation for Netflix. On 3 September 2019, Rajkummar Rao, Priyanka Chopra Jonas, and Adarsh Gourav were cast in the film. The film was released on 23 January 2021 in select theatres and on Netflix. It was nominated for Best Adapted Screenplay at the 74th British Academy Film Awards and 93rd Academy Awards.
