= Ammembal Subba Rao Pai =

Lawyer in India

- Born: Ammembal Subba Rao Pai; 19 November 1852; Mulki, Mangalore
- Died: 25 July 1909 (aged 56)
- Occupations: Lawyer and Banker
- Notable work: Canara Bank founder

Ammembal Subba Rao Pai (19 November 1852 – 25 July 1909) was a leading lawyer of Mangalore, India. He was the founder of Canara Bank, now one of India's leading banks, and Canara High School in Mangalore. Though he was a lawyer and a banker by profession, he was an educationist and social reformer by temperament. He helped shape the future of Dakshina Kannada District and of the GSB community in Karnataka.

== Early life ==
Pai was the youngest of the four sons of Upendra Pai, a lawyer practicing in the Munsif's court at Mulki, near Mangalore. Born on 19 November 1852, at Mulki, near Mangalore, he underwent early schooling at Government High School, Mangalore, and it was the early demise of his mother that is believed to have profoundly influenced him to take to studies seriously. After passing his F.A.(First Arts examination) examination, his father sent him to Madras (now Chennai) to take up higher studies. Following his graduation (B.A.) from the Presidency College, he joined the Madras Law College and stood First Class First in Bachelor of Law (B.L) in 1875. Here he came into contact with Justice Holloway, whose personality was a rewarding experience to him.

== Career ==
In 1876, following the demise of his father, he returned to Mangalore and successfully practiced law (it is said that he often attempted to persuade amicable out-of-court settlements for his clients, although this sometime cost him his fee).

Pai was also an admirer of nationalist leaders of India. He held Sri Aurobinda Ghosh (later known as Sri Aurobindo) in great admiration. He was an avid reader of Aurobindo's paper 'Yugantar'. In his office room was prominently displayed a portrait of Ashwini Kumar Dutta, one of the heroes of nationalist Bengal, one word from whom could make the traders of his native town refuse to sell even a yard of cloth to European officers, including the collector of the district.

Pai was a patriot at heart and a humanist by action. In 1891, four teachers, whom he had met in Madras,(now Chennai) approached him with a proposal to start a school in Mangalore and thus was born the Canara High School, on 22 acres of land donated by Upendra Pai, his father in Mangalore. He also firmly believed that for the social and economic uplift, education was the key. Education is not confined to only men. Shortly thereafter, in 1894, with a view to encouraging the education of girls, he started the Canara Girls' High School, indeed a revolutionary step considering the prevalent values and attitude of the people towards women's education at that time.

The disastrous crash of the Arbuthnot Company at the beginning of the 20th century prompted him to start, in 1906, the Canara Hindu Permanent Fund Ltd.(now Canara Bank) with a view to enabling the community to mobilise its own resources for self-help. All the three institutions namely, Canara Bank, Canara High School and Canara Girls' School started by him have grown in size and stature.

Among his important contributions to the GSB (Gaud Saraswat Brahmin) community was the setting up of the ‘Poor Boys Education Fund’ (which became ASRP Memorial Fund as per the decision taken at a meeting of the GSB community held in the Bhuvanendra Hall on 1 August 1909) under the aegis of Gowda Saraswath Brahman Parishad, of which he was one of the founders. He believed in creating an institution focused on social responsibilities. 'Focus on your goals and profits will follow' was his dictum.

== Death ==
Throughout his life, Ammembal Subba Rao Pai suffered from a severe gout, an affliction to which he finally succumbed on 25 July 1909.

== Business career ==
Concerned about the high interest rates being charged by moneylenders to the poor people of South Canara, Pai founded the Canara Hindu Permanent Fund Ltd. (now Canara Bank) on 1 July 1906, not long after the formation of Corporation Bank in the same area.

== Gallery ==
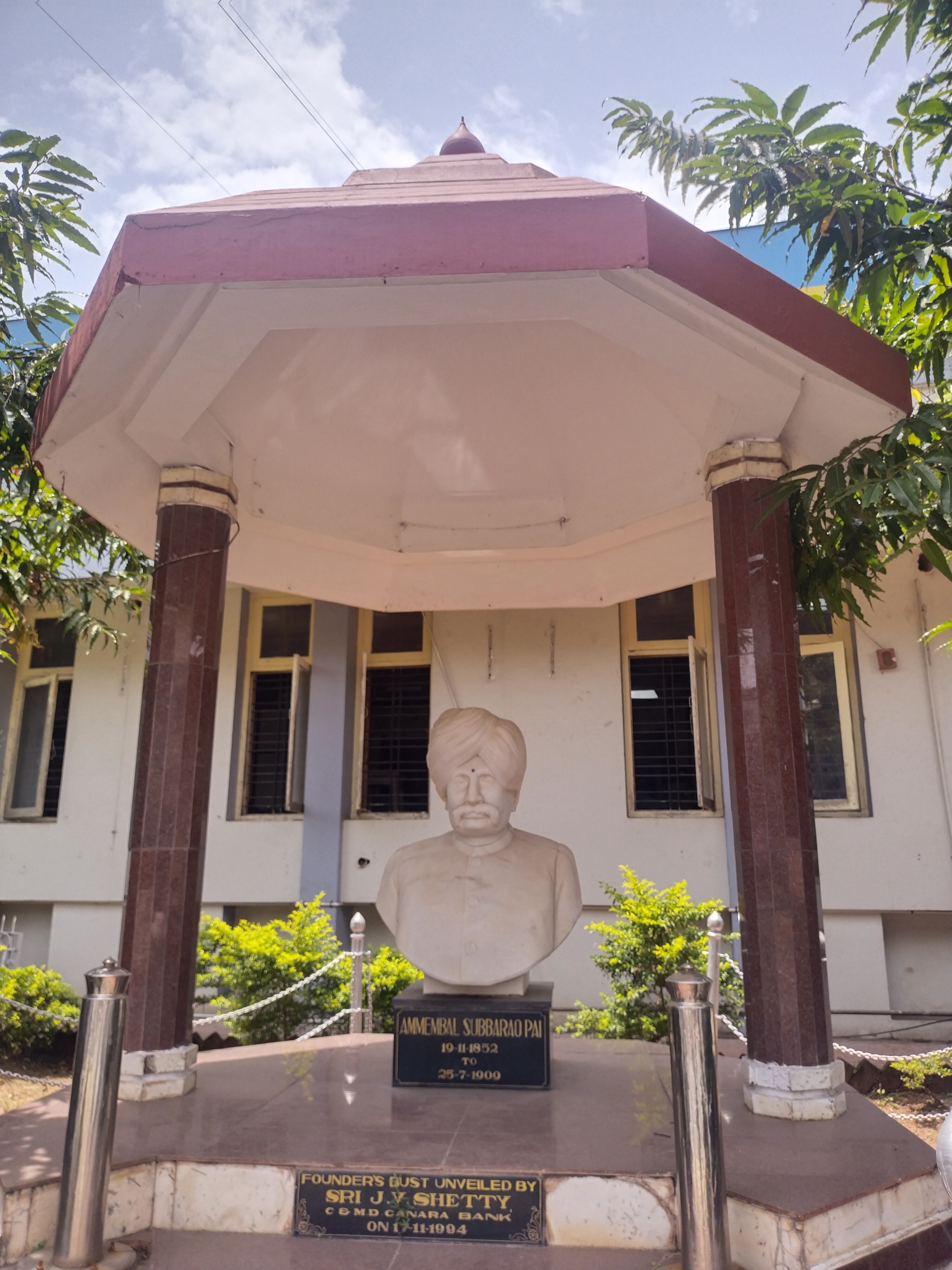
Bust of Sri Ammembal Subbarao Pai at Canara Bank Founder's Branch, Mangalore
