= State Bank of Mysore =

Former associate bank of State Bank of India

- Type: Public sector
- Traded as: BSE: 532200; NSE: MYSOREBANK
- ISIN: INE651A01020
- Industry: Banking, Insurance, Capital Markets and allied industries
- Predecessor: The Bank of Mysore Ltd.
- Founded: 2 October 1913; 113 years ago as The Bank of Mysore Ltd.
- Founder: Sir M. Visvesvaraya
- Defunct: 31 March 2017
- Fate: Merged with State Bank of India
- Successor: State Bank of India
- Headquarters: Bangalore
- Number of locations: 1074 branches and 9 extension counters
- Area served: India
- Key people: Chairman: Arundhati Bhattacharya; Managing Director: N.K.Chari
- Products: Deposits, Personal Banking Schemes, C & I Banking Schemes, Agri Banking Schemes, SME Banking Schemes
- Services: Loans, Deposits, Mobile Banking, ATM Services, NRI Services, Real Time Gross Settlement (RTGS) Transactions, National Electronic Fund Transfer (NEFT), Internet Banking, Debit Card
- Net income: ▲₹276 Crores
- Total equity: ▲3988 Crores as on 31 Mar 2014
- Number of employees: 10,226 (31 December 2016): 3,600 supervisory staff; 6,626 non-supervisory staff
- Parent: State Bank of India (90%)
- Website: bank.sbi

State Bank of Mysore was a Public Sector bank in India, with headquarters at Bangalore. It was one of the five associate banks of State Bank of India, all of which were consolidated with the State Bank of India with effect from 1 April 2017.

State Bank of Mysore was established in the year 1913 as The Bank of Mysore Ltd. under the patronage of Maharaja Krishna Raja Wadiyar IV, at the instance of the banking committee headed by the great Engineer-Statesman, Bharat Ratna Sir M.Visvesvaraya. During 1953, "Mysore Bank" was appointed as an agent of Reserve Bank of India to undertake Government business and treasury operations, and in March 1960, it became a subsidiary of the State Bank of India under the State Bank of India (subsidiary Banks) Act 1959. Now the bank is an Associate Bank under State Bank Group and the State Bank of India holds 92.33% of shares. The Bank's shares were listed in Bangalore, Chennai, and Mumbai stock exchanges.

This bank had 976 branches and 10627 employees (June 2014) and the Bank has 772 branches (79%) in Karnataka State. The bank had regional offices in Bangalore, Mysore, Mangalore, Mandya, Hassan, Shimoga, Davangere, Bellary, Tumkur, Kolar, Chennai, Coimbatore, Hyderabad, Mumbai and New Delhi. The bank's turnover in the year 2013-2014 was around US$19 Billion and Profit about US$46 Million.

== History ==
=== 20th Century ===
- 1913 - The Bank was established as 'Bank of Mysore Ltd.', on 19 May, with an authorised capital of Rs. 20.00 lakhs.
- Commenced its business on 2 October 1913.
- 1953 - During the year, the Bank was appointed as an Agent of Reserve Bank of India to conduct Government business & treasury operations.
- 1959 - With effect from 10 September, the Bank was constituted as State Bank of Mysore as a Subsidiary of State Bank of India, under State Bank of India [Subsidiary Banks] Act, 1959 enacted through an Act of Parliament, [Act No. 38 of 1959s].
- 1959 -The bank has formulated schemes for financing coffee planters/coffee traders against coffee curers certificate, financing coffee traders, coffee exporters & coffee curers who also engage in trading.

=== Government Schemes ===
- The Bank actively participated in all Government sponsored schemes and contributed its share of financial assistance or the economically weaker sections through DIR, IRDP, Prime Minister Rojgar Yojna & SUME schemes.

- The Bank has sponsored two Regional Rural Banks, Cauvery Grameena Bank & Kalpatharu Gameena Bank which were merged to form Kaveri-Kalpatharu Gramin Brank, headquartered at Mysore with more than 250 branches for growth of agriculture & rural industries.
- The Bank, as part of State Bank Group has been engaged in financing agriculture and MSME in 1960 & introduced the concept of need based rather than security oriented finance & the Entrepreneur scheme under which technically qualified persons were financed the entire requirement up to Rs. 2 lacs.
- The Bank has 3 specialised SSI branches to assist the SSI units & proposes to establish 3 more such 551 branches shortly.
- The Bank has correspondent & agency arrangements all over the world & offers spot services in 18 major approved currencies.
- State Bank of Mysore handles a significant part of day-to-day banking business of both the Central & State Governments in the State of Karnataka & is a Banker to various Public Sector Undertakings in various sectors of Economy.
- The Bank has been actively participating in welfare banking needs of public through its community services.
- The Bank is a member of society for worldwide Inter Bank Financial Telecommunication [SWIFTs] which was established to offer cost effective & fast transmission of financial messages globally, 2 branches of Bank are presently covered under the scheme and an additional 15 branches are proposed to be covered under SWIFT shortly.
- 1992 - The State Government has also taken up vigorously 'ASHRAYA', a new housing scheme for weaker sections & 'VISHWA', a new rural & cottage industry scheme. A new programme called 'AKSHAYA' has also been launched to help the children in primary education. The Konkan Railway Project & the New Mangalore Port Project are also progressing satisfactorily.
- 1994 - Several important measures have been introduced in the busy season credit policy of November 1993 & slack season credit policy of May 1994, announced by Reserve Bank of Indi

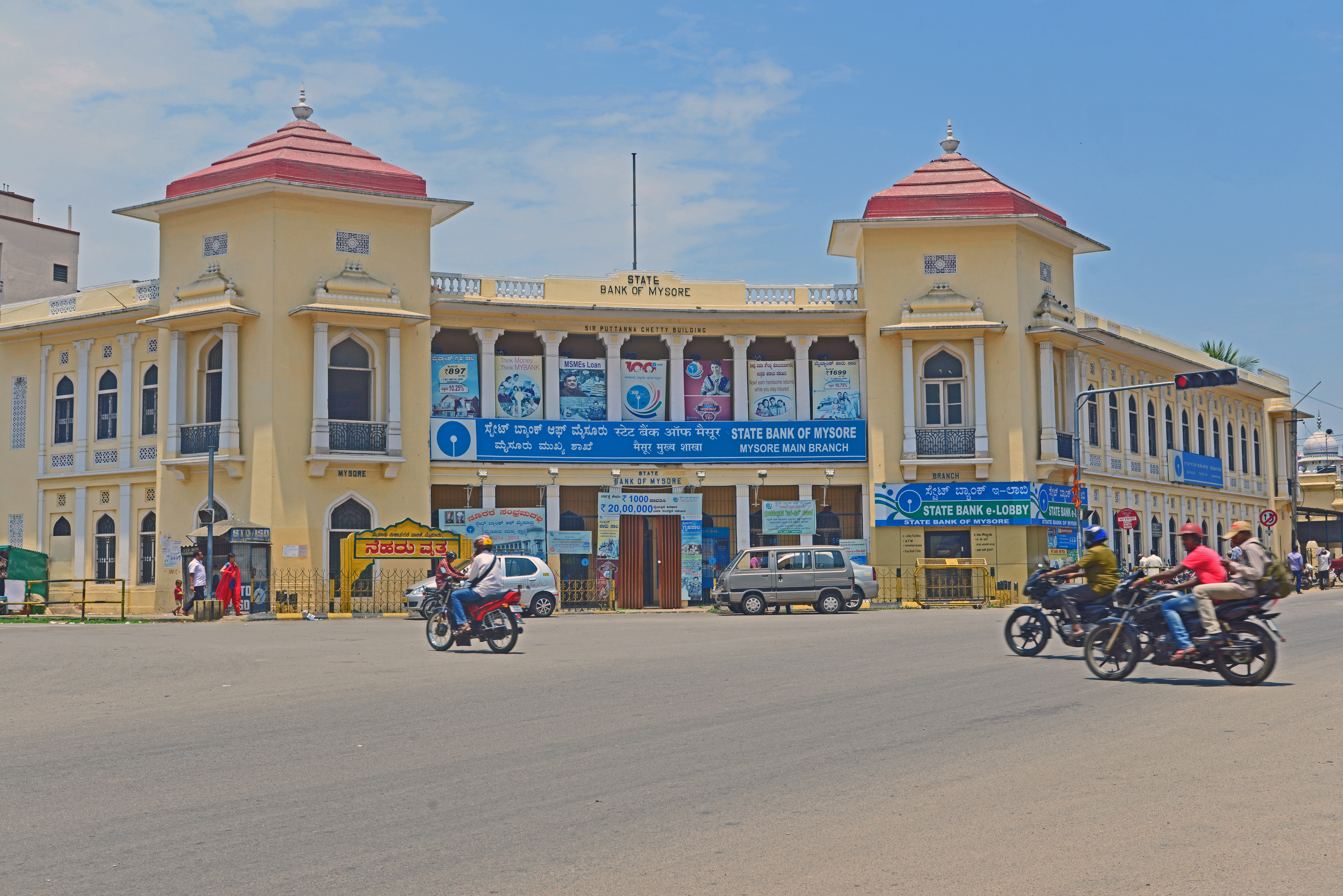
State Bank of Mysore, Main Branch in Mysore.

=== 21st Century ===
- 2001 - State Bank of Mysore has opened a foreign exchange cell at its Hirehally Industrial estate branch in Tumkur district to enable small-scale industrialists to manage their foreign exchange transactions.

- The Bank has closed its issue of unsecured non-convertible debentures after raising the target of Rs 60 crore.

- 2002

-Enters the market with a coupon of 6.4% per annum for its Tier-II capital bonds issue of Rs. 60cr on a private placement basis.

-Slashes interest rate on domestic term deposits & on NRE deposits by 25-50 basis points.

- 2003

-Considers new method of appraisal for lending to the agricultural sector more on the lines of industrial credit given to trade & commerce.

-Declared a dividend of 40% on equity capital for year ended.

-Ties up with HMT Ltd & launches SBM-HMT Agri Farm Scheme, to promote agricultural mechanisation in south India.

-Maruti Udyog forges alliances with SBM to offer car finance.

- 2004

-Mr. Vijayanand assumes charges as managing director of bank from 01/03/2004

-State Bank of Mysore has joined the Real Time Gross Settlement Systems [RTGSs] network that facilitates inter-bank funds settlement on 22 July.

- 2005 : 100% computerisation and Core Banking Solutions (CBS) introduced.
- 2005 : SBM unveils new single window system
- 2006 : Mr P.P. Pattanayak has assumed charge as managing director of State Bank of Mysore. Mr Pattanayak was earlier Deputy Managing Director [DMDs] & Chief Credit Officer of State Bank of India, Mumbai.
- 2009 : The Company splits its share with face value from Rs. 100/- to Rs. 10/-.
- 2009 : Sri Dilip Mavinkurve takes charge as managing director of the Bank. He was earlier Chief General Manager of the Bank.
- 2012 : Shri Sharad Sharma takes charge as managing director of the bank.
- 2013 : The Bank celebrated its centenary year during the period 2 October 2012 to 1 October 2013.
- 2017 : After 104 years of banking history, State Bank of Mysore was merged with State Bank of India on 1 April 2017.

== See also ==
- List of banks that have merged to form the State Bank of India
- Indian banking
- List of banks in India
