= Karnataka Bank =

Indian commercial bank

The Karnataka Bank Limited
- Type: Public
- Traded as: BSE: 532652; NSE: KTKBANK
- Industry: Banking, financial services
- Founded: 18 February 1924; 102 years ago
- Headquarters: Mangalore, Karnataka, India
- Number of locations: 957 Branches
- Key people: P. Pradeep Kumar (Part-Time Non-Executive Chairman); Raghavendra Srinivas Bhat (Managing Director & Chief Executive Officer)
- Products: Retail banking, corporate/wholesale banking, treasury operations, credit card, bancassurance
- Revenue: ▲₹8,213 crore (US$850 million) (2023)
- Operating income: ▲₹2,208.23 crore (US$230 million) (2023)
- Net income: ▲₹1,180.24 crore (US$120 million) (2023)
- Total assets: ▲₹120,961.78 crore (US$13 billion) (2025)
- Number of employees: 8,652 (2023)
- Capital ratio: 17.45%
- Website: karnatakabank.bank.in

Karnataka Bank Limited is an Indian private sector bank based in Mangalore. It is an 'A' Class Scheduled Commercial Bank with a network of 957 branches, 1188 ATMs & Cash recyclers and 588 e-lobbies/mini e-lobbies across 22 states and 2 union territories. It has 8,652 employees and over 11 million customers throughout the country. Its shares are listed on the NSE and BSE. The tagline of the bank is "Your Family Bank Across India."

Karnataka Bank Limited has adopted core banking, internet banking and has established its "MoneyPlant" (1187 ATMs & Cash recyclers and 586 e-lobbies/mini e-lobbies) ATM system across the country.

== History ==
Karnataka Bank Limited was incorporated on 18 February 1924, and commenced business on 23 May 1924. Its founders established it at Mangaluru, a coastal town in the Dakshina Kannada district of Karnataka. Among the founders, who created the bank to serve the South Canara region, was B. R. Vysaray Achar. K. Suryanarayana Adiga served as the chairman from 1958 to 1979.

In the 1960s Karnataka Bank Limited acquired three smaller banks. In 1960 Karnataka Bank Limited acquired the Sringeri Sharada Bank, which was established in 1942 had four branches. Four years later, Karnataka Bank Limited took over Chitradurga Bank (also known as Chitladurg Bank), which was established in 1868 and was the oldest bank in Mysore State. In 1966, Karnataka Bank Limited took over Bank of Karnataka. Bank of Karnataka was established in 1946 and opened one branch in Belgaum in 1947. At the time of this acquisition, Bank of Karnataka had 13 branches.

In September 2003, the bank shifted its head office from Kodialbail to Kankanady.

In Karnataka Bank reported Rs 285 crore fraud to Reserve Bank of India by DHFL, Religare Finvest, Fedders Electric and Engineering Ltd and Leel Electricals Ltd.

In 2021, Karnataka Bank Limited operationalized its wholly owned non-financial subsidiary KBL Services Limited with its registered and head office at Bangalore.

== Services ==
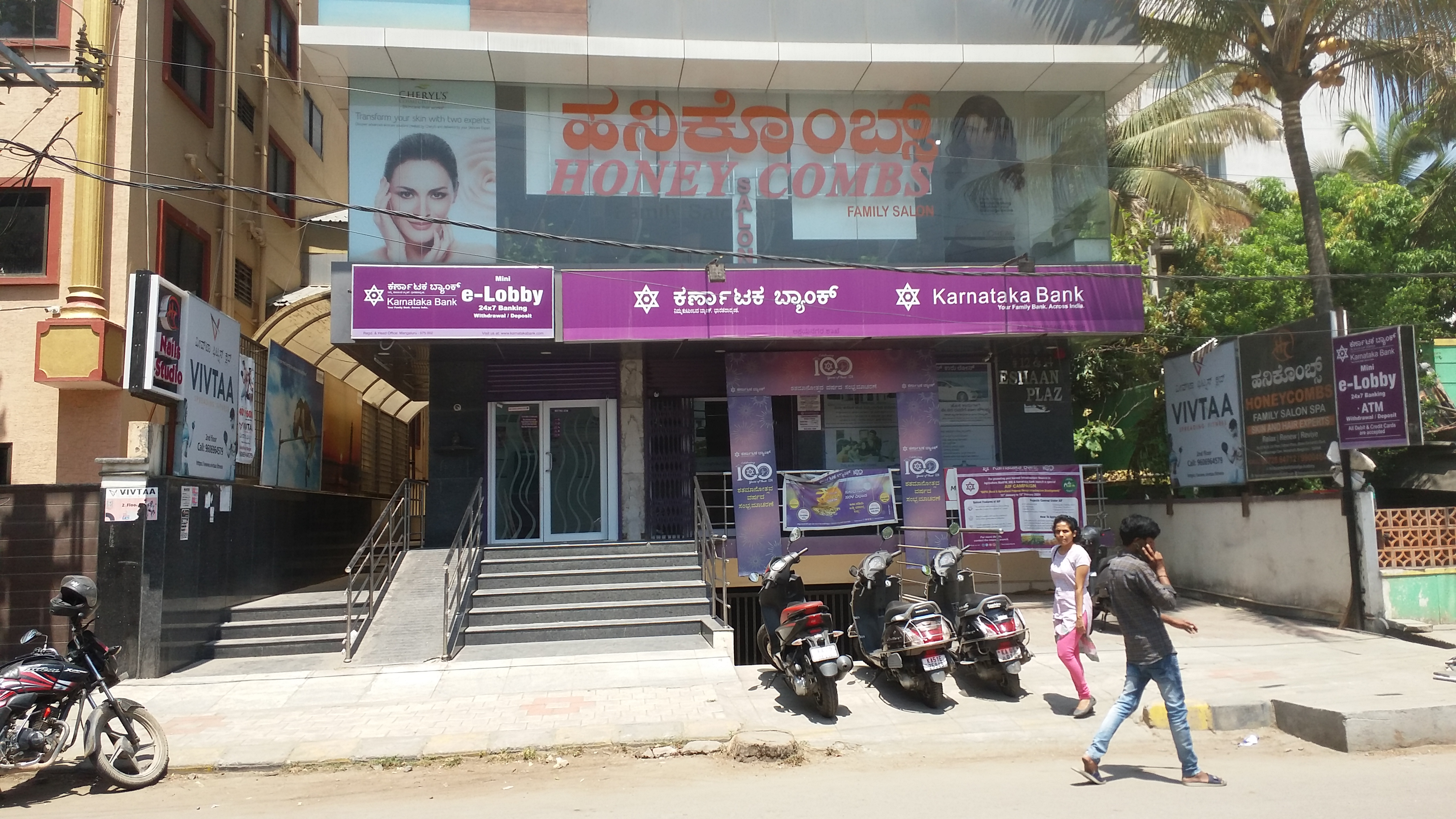
Karnataka Bank Limited's Branch

The branches are available in 22 Indian states and 2 Union Territories. In August 2008, the Karnataka Bank Limited introduced Quick Remit, a facility to make money transfers easy for Non-Resident Indians living in Canada, United States, and the UK. The bank also runs a 24-hour Internet banking service called MoneyClick.

Karnataka Bank Limited provides business and personal banking products and services in India. The bank has four areas of business: Treasury, Corporate/Wholesale Banking, Retail Banking, and Other Banking Operations. It accepts savings and current accounts, cash certificates, fixed and cumulative deposits, non-resident rupee accounts, ordinary non-resident accounts, and foreign currency accounts; and offers loan products, such as vehicle, home, education, personal, MSME, mortgage, women entrepreneur, gold, and other loans, as well as loans against property and fixed deposits. The bank also provides debit, credit, gift, deposit only, image, and travel cards; life, general, and health insurance products; investments services; and remittance and other services. In addition, it offers forex services, which include pre and post-shipment, export collection bills, export LC advising, inward remittance facility, import letter of credit, import bill collection, buyer's credit, and outward remittances. Additionally, it offers various loans for agriculture; and other services, such as Internet banking, mutual funds, demat services, locker facility, and funds transfer services.

=== Digital banking ===
- KBL Mobile Plus
- KBL mPassbook
- BHIM KBL UPI App
- KBL POS Manager
- KBL MoneyClick Internet Banking

== Managing Directors & CEOs ==
Name	Term start	Term end	Refs.
B. R. Vyasaraya Achar	1924	1958	
K. Suryanarayana Adiga	23 November 1958	15 February 1979	
K. N. Basri	15 February 1979	19 February 1980	
P. Raghuram	16 June 1980	15 June 1985	
P. Sundar Rao	11 September 1985	10 September 1989	
H. M. Rama Rao	11 January 1990	11 January 1993	
U. V. Bhat	28 June 1993	27 June 1995	
M. S. Krishna Bhat	12 July 1995	11 July 2000	
Ananthakrishna	13 July 2000	11 July 2009	
Polali Jayarama Bhat	12 July 2009	10 April 2017	
M. S. Mahabaleshwara	15 April 2017	14 April 2023	
Srikrishnan Hari Hara Sarma	26 April 2023	15 July 2025	
Raghavendra Srinivas Bhat	16 July 2025	Present	

== See also ==
- Banking in India
- Indian Financial System Code
