= Canara Bank =

Public sector bank in India

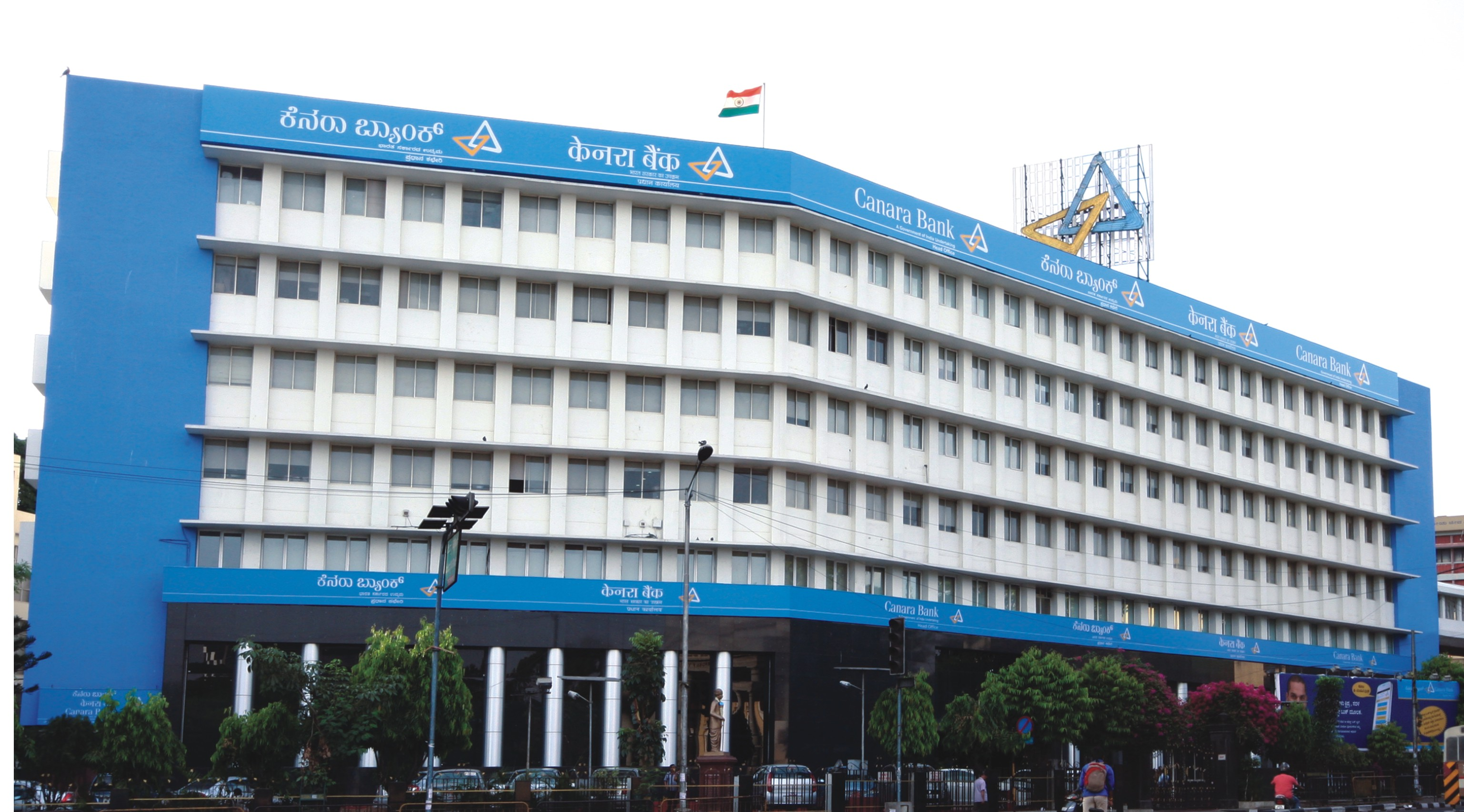
- Canara Bank head office in Bengaluru
- Type: Public
- Traded as: BSE: 532483; NSE: CANBK
- Industry: Banking; Financial services
- Founded: 1 July 1906; 120 years ago
- Founder: Ammembal Subba Rao Pai
- Headquarters: Town Hall Junction, Bengaluru, Karnataka, India
- Number of locations: 10,131 branches and 7907 ATM & 2940 CRM (June 2025)
- Key people: Vijay Srirangan (Non-Exe Chairman); Brajesh Kumar Singh (MD & CEO)
- Products: Retail banking; Corporate banking; Investment banking; Mortgage loans; Private banking; Wealth management; Asset management; Investment management; Credit cards; Insurance
- Revenue: ▲₹180,042 crore (US$19 billion) (2026)
- Operating income: ▲₹33,019 crore (US$3.4 billion) (2026)
- Net income: ▲₹19,187 crore (US$2.0 billion) (2026)
- Total assets: ▲₹1,638,200 crore (US$170 billion) (2026)
- Total equity: ▲₹94,850 crore (US$9.8 billion) (2026)
- Owner: Government of India (62.93%)
- Number of employees: 86,700 (2026)
- Capital ratio: 16.59%
- Website: canarabank.bank.in

Canara Bank is an Indian public sector bank based in Bengaluru. Established in 1906 in Mangalore by Ammembal Subba Rao Pai, the bank was nationalized in 1969. Canara Bank also has offices in London, Leicester, Hong Kong, Shanghai, Manama, Johannesburg, New York City, Dubai, and a representative office in Sharjah.

== History ==
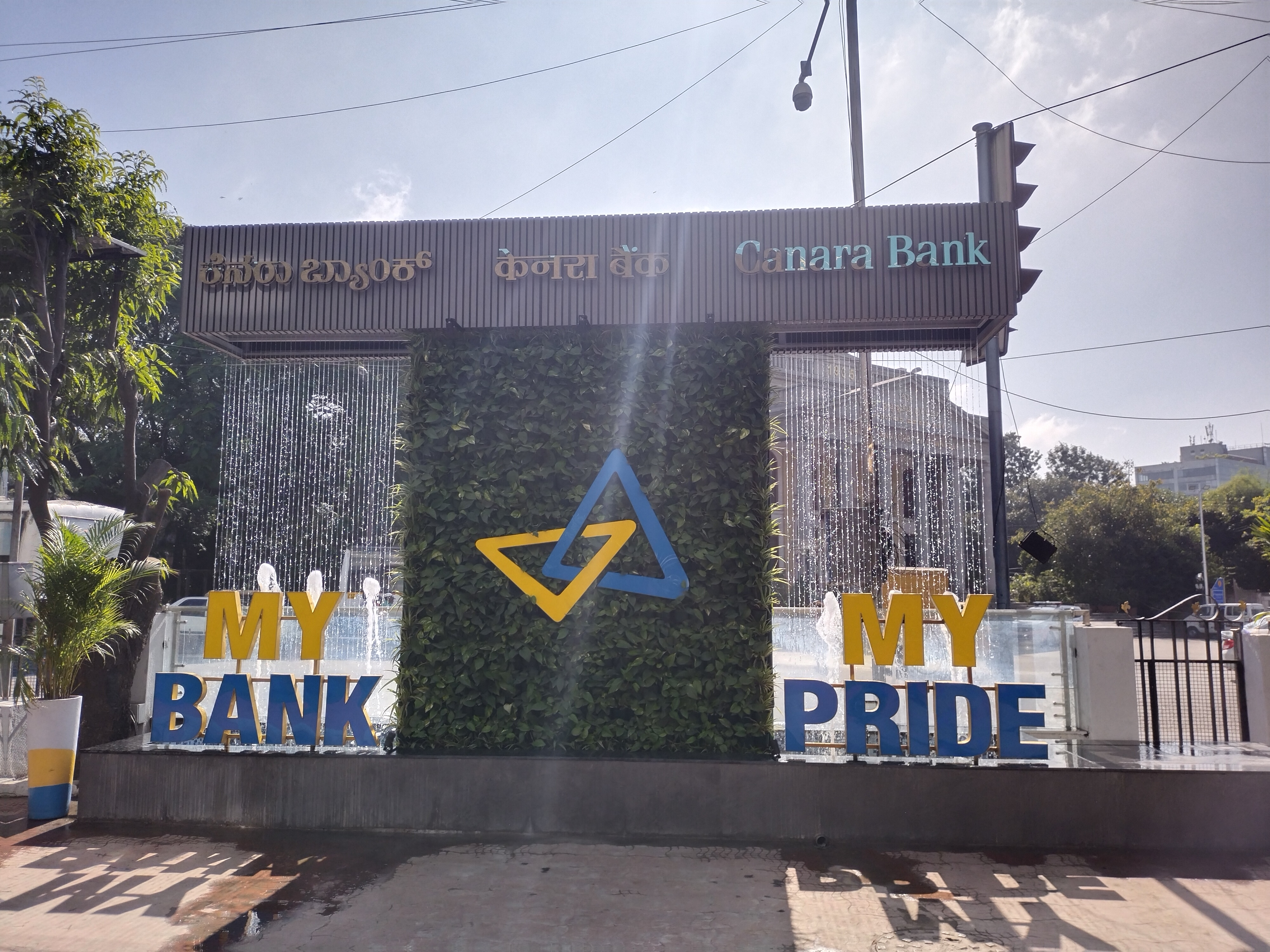
Logo at Head Office of Canara Bank, Bengaluru

Ammembal Subba Rao Pai, a philanthropist, established the Canara Hindu Permanent Fund in Mangalore, India, on 1 July 1906. In 1910, the name of the bank was changed to Canara Bank Ltd.

Canara Bank's first acquisition took place in 1961 when it acquired the Bank of Kerala. Founded in September 1944, the Bank of Kerala had three branches at the time of its acquisition on 20 May 1961. The second bank acquired was Seasia Midland Bank (Alleppey), which had been established on 26 July 1930 and had seven branches at the time of its takeover.

In 1958, the Reserve Bank of India ordered Canara Bank to acquire G. Raghumathmul Bank in Hyderabad. This bank was established in 1870 and converted to a limited company in 1925. At the time of the acquisition, G. Raghumathmul Bank had five branches. The merger took effect in 1961. Later that year, Canara Bank acquired Trivandrum Permanent Bank, which was founded on 7 February 1899 and had 14 branches at the time of the merger.

Canara Bank acquired four banks in 1963: the Sree Poornathrayeesa Vilasam Bank of Thrippunithura, Arnad Bank of Tiruchirapalli, Cochin Commercial Bank of Cochin, and Pandyan Bank of Madurai. Sree Poornathrayeesa Vilasam Bank was established on 21 February 1923 and had 14 branches at the time of its acquisition. Arnad Bank was established on 23 December 1942 and had one branch. Cochin Commercial Bank was established on 3 January 1936 and had 13 branches. Pandyan Bank was established in Madurai, Tamil Nadu, by S.N.K. Sundaram on 11 December 1946. It created an all-women's branch at Town Hall Road, Madurai, in 1947, staffed by ten women, one of whom was Kamala Sundaram, the founder's daughter. The merger with Canara Bank took effect on 2 December 1963, at which time Pandyan Bank had 83 branches.

The Government of India nationalised Canara Bank, along with 13 other major commercial banks, on 19 July 1969. Karkala Pulkeri Janardhan Prabhu (KPJ Prabhu) served as chairman of the bank post-nationalisation. In 1976, Canara Bank inaugurated its 1,000th branch. In 1983, the bank inaugurated their overseas branch in London. In 1985, it acquired Lakshmi Commercial Bank in a rescue. The same year, they commissioned Indo Hong Kong International Finance Ltd. In 1987, the bank launched Canbank Mutual Fund & Canfin Homes. In 1989, the Canbank Venture Capital Fund was started. During the year 1989-90, the bank incorporated their factoring subsidiary Canbank Factors Ltd.

The bank was listed on the stock market on December 23 2002, following its Initial Public Offering. It traded on major Indian Stock Exchange.

During the years 2007-08, the bank launched insurance and asset management joint ventures.

On 30 August 2019, Finance Minister Nirmala Sitharaman announced that Syndicate Bank would be merged with Canara Bank. The proposed merger would create the fourth-largest public sector bank in the country, with a total business of ₹15.20 lakh crore (US$160 billion) and 10,324 branches. After obtaining the requisite approvals, the merger was completed on 1 April 2020, with Syndicate Bank shareholders receiving 158 equity shares in Canara Bank for every 1,000 shares held.

== Shareholding ==
As of October 2025, the promoter holding (held by Government of India) at the bank is 62.93% and the public holding is 37.07%.

== Subsidiaries ==
=== Domestic subsidiaries ===
- Canfin Homes Limited (CFHL)- A network of 110 branches and 28 satellite offices throughout India
- Canbank Factors Limited
- Canbank Venture Capital Fund Limited
- Canbank Computer Services Limited
- Canara Bank Securities Limited
- Canara Robeco Asset Management Company Limited
- Canbank Financial Services Limited

=== Joint ventures ===
- Canara HSBC Life Insurance

=== Foreign branches ===
- London branch (U.K.)
- New York branch (U.S.A.)
- Dubai International Financial Centre branch (UAE)

=== Overseas subsidiaries ===
- Canara Bank (Tanzania) Ltd.

=== International wealth management ===
Since 1983, Canara Bank has been responsible for the management of Eastern Exchange Co. WLL, Doha, Qatar, which Abdul Rahman M.M. Al Muftah established in 1979.

== Regional rural banks ==
Canara Bank sponsors two regional rural banks (RRB):

- Kerala Grameena Bank – It is headquartered at Malappuram, Kerala, and operates in all districts in Kerala. It was established on 8 July 2013 as a Scheduled Commercial Bank.
- Karnataka Grameena Bank – It is headquartered at Bellary, Karnataka, and has 1,750 branches across all districts in Karnataka. It was established on 1 May 2025 under the "One State, One RRB" policy of government of India.

== Controversies ==
On 6 June 2018, the UK division of Canara Bank was fined £890,000 ($1.2 million) by the UK's Financial Conduct Authority and was blocked from accepting new deposits for around five months for systematic anti-money laundering (AML) failures.

Canara Bank faced a monetary penalty of Rs 2.92 crore from the Reserve Bank of India (RBI) due to non-compliance with regulations, including failures in linking interest rates of loans to external benchmarks and other operational norms.

In 2024, Canara Bank officers were recorded verbally abusing employees for not meeting their work targets, and the videos circulated on social media, prompting the bank to publicly address these incidents.

== See also ==
- Banking in India
- List of banks in India
- Reserve Bank of India
- Indian Financial System Code
