= Outline of Kerala =

Overview of and topical guide to Kerala

Location of Kerala in India.

The following outline is provided as an overview of and topical guide to Kerala:

Kerala – 21st biggest, 12th most populous, 13th highest and most literate of the 28 states of the democratic Republic of India. Kerala is ranked 9th in the country in tax revenue and GDP. Kerala has the highest life expectancy and female-to-male sex ratio in India. Kerala is also the most media exposed state.

== General reference ==
=== Names ===
- Common name: Kerala
- Local name: Keralam
- Official name: State of Kerala
- Nicknames
  - God's Own Country
- Adjectivals
  - Kerala
  - Keralite
- Demonyms
  - Keralites
  - Malayalis
- Abbreviations and name codes
  - ISO 3166-2 code: IN-KL
  - Vehicle registration code: KL, series: List of RTO districts in Kerala

=== Rankings (amongst India's states) ===
- by population: 13th
- by area: 22nd
- by gross domestic product (GDP) (2104): 12th
- by Human Development Index (HDI): 1st
- by life expectancy at birth: 1st
- by literacy rate: 1st

List of states and union territories of India by households having electricity: 1st

Indian states ranking by media exposure: 1st

== Geography ==
- Kerala is: an Indian state, a state of the Republic of India.

=== Location of Kerala ===
- Kerala is situated within the following regions:
  - Northern Hemisphere
  - Eastern Hemisphere
    - Eurasia
      - Asia
        - South Asia
          - Indian subcontinent
            - India
              - South India
- Time zone: Indian Standard Time (UTC+05:30)

=== Environment of Kerala ===
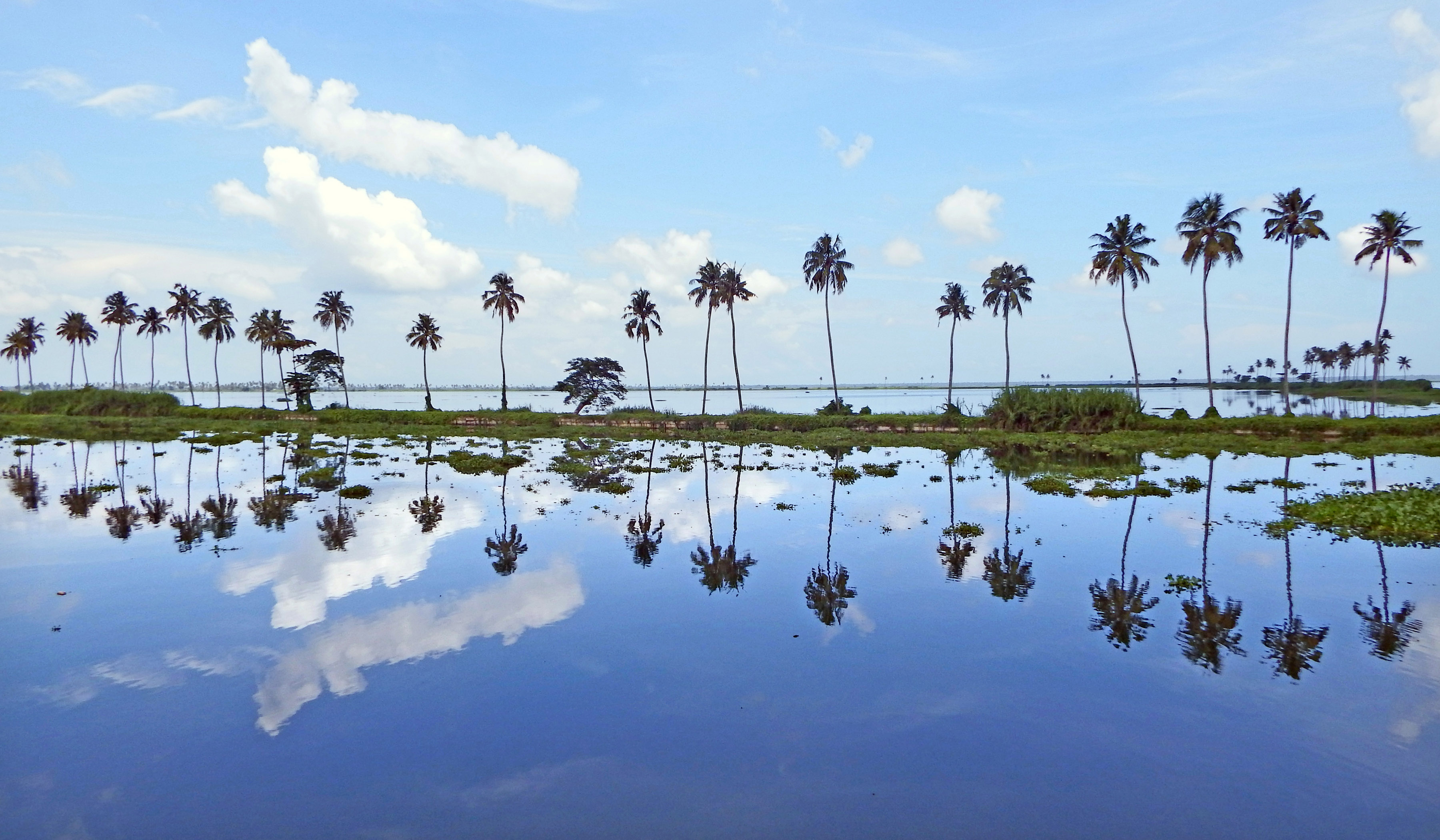
Vembanad Lake at Kumarakom, Kottayam

- Climate of Kerala
- Protected areas of Kerala
  - Biosphere reserves in Kerala
    - Agasthyamala Biosphere Reserve
    - Nilgiri Biosphere Reserve
  - National parks of Kerala
    - Eravikulam National Park
- Wildlife of Kerala
  - Flora of Kerala
  - Fauna of Kerala
    - Birds of Kerala

==== Natural geographic features of Kerala ====
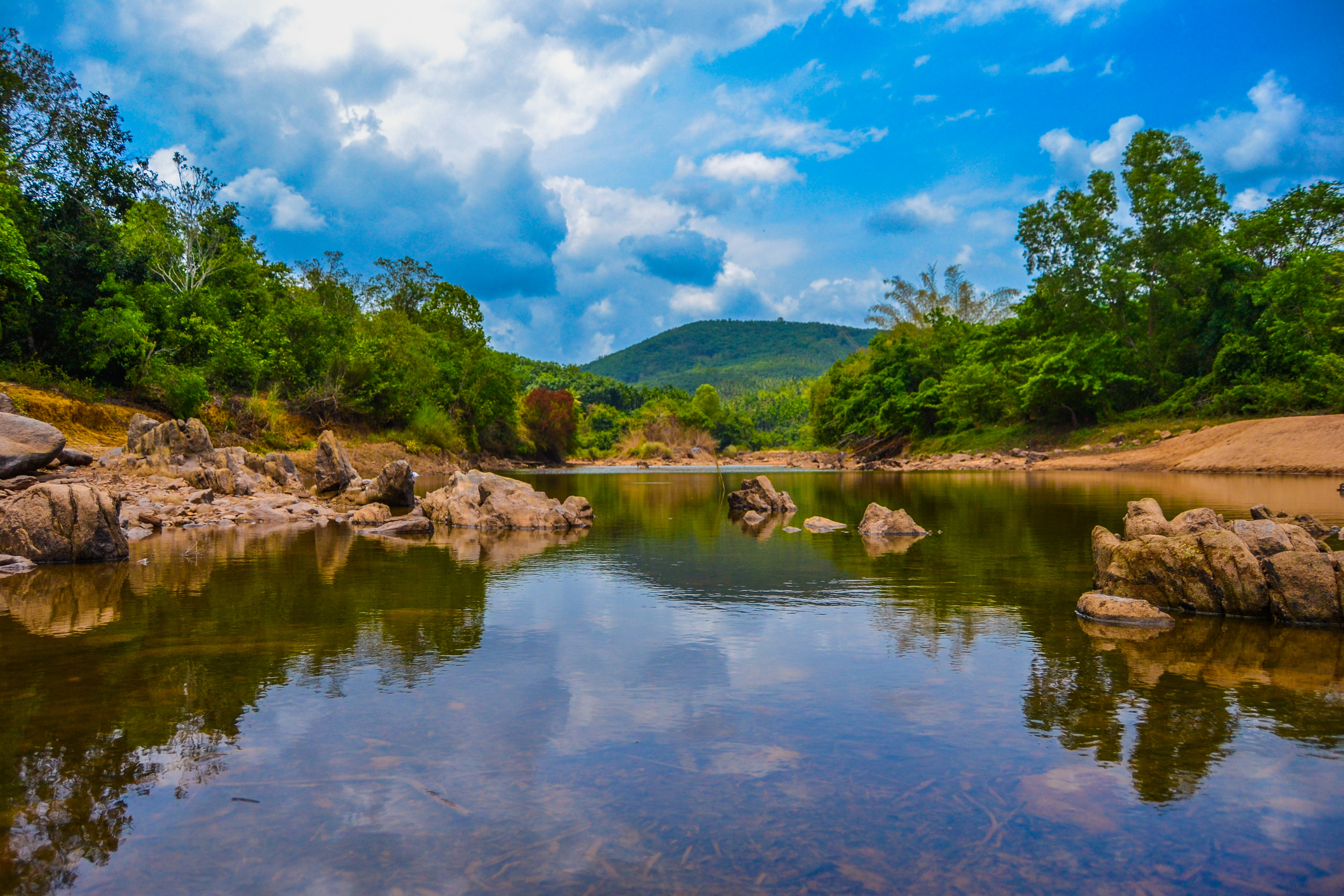
Chandragiri River at Kasaragod

- Malabar Coast
- Lakes of Kerala
  - Kerala Backwaters
  - Vembanad Lake
- Hills and mountains of Kerala
  - Annamalai Hills
  - Nilgiri Hills
  - Nelliampathi Mountains
- Islands in Kerala
  - Islands of Kollam
- Mountain passes in Kerala
  - Palakkad Gap
- Rivers of Kerala

== Administrative divisions ==
=== Districts ===
Districts of Kerala

Kerala's districts

Kerala's 14 districts.

Districts of Kerala

- Malappuram
- Kozhikode
- Wayanad
- Kannur
- Kasaragod
- Idukki
- Ernakulam
- Thrissur
- Palakkad
- Thiruvananthapuram
- Kollam
- Pathanamthitta
- Alappuzha
- Kottayam

==== Taluks ====
- Adoor
- Alathoor
- Aluva
- Ambalappuzha
- Changanasserry
- Chalakudy
- Chavakkad
- Chenganoor
- Cherthala
- Chittur
- Chirayinkeezhu
- Devikulam
- Eranad
- Hosdurg
- Iritty
- Kanayannur
- Kanjirappally
- Kannur
- Karthikappally
- Karunagappalli
- Kasaragod
- Kochi
- Kodungallor
- Kollam
- Kondotty
- Kothamangalam
- Kottarakkara
- Kottayam
- Koyilandy
- Kozhencherry
- Kozhikode
- Kunnamkulam
- Kunnathur
- Kunnathunad
- Kuttanad
- Mallappally
- Mananthavadi
- Manjeshwaram
- Mannarkkad
- Mavelikkara
- Meenachil
- Mukundapuram
- Muvattupuzha
- Nedumangad
- Neyyattinkara
- Nilambur
- Ottappalam
- Palakkad
- Paravur
- Pathanapuram
- Pattambi
- Payyanur
- Peermade
- Perinthalmanna
- Ponnani
- Ranni
- Sulthan Batheri
- Taliparamba
- Thalappilli
- Thalassery
- Thamarassery
- Thiruvalla
- Thiruvananthapuram
- Thodupuzha
- Thrissur
- Tirur
- Tirurangadi
- Udumbanchola
- Varkala
- Vatakara
- Vaikom
- Vellarikundu
- Vythiri

=== Local governments ===
==== Municipal corporations ====
- Thiruvananthapuram
- Kozhikode
- Kochi
- Kollam
- Thrissur
- Kannur

==== Municipalities ====
- Adoor
- Alappuzha
- Aluva
- Angamaly
- Anthoor
- Attingal
- Chalakkudy
- Changanacherry
- Chavakkad
- Chengannur
- Cherpulassery
- Cherthala
- Chittur - Tattamangalam
- Eloor
- Erattupetta
- Ettumanoor
- Feroke
- Guruvayoor
- Harippad
- Irinjalakuda
- Iritty
- Kalamassery
- Kalpetta
- Kanhangad
- Kattappana
- Karunagapally
- Kasaragod
- Kayamkulam
- Kodungallur
- Koduvally
- Kondotty
- Koothattukulam
- Kothamangalam
- Kottakkal
- Kottayam
- Kottarakara
- Koyilandy
- Kunnamkulam
- Kuthuparamba
- Malappuram
- Mananthavadi
- Manjeri
- Mannarkkad
- Maradu
- Mattannur
- Mavelikkara
- Mukkam
- Muvattupuzha
- Nedumangad
- Neyyattinkara
- Nilambur
- Nileshwaram
- North Paravoor
- Ottappalam
- Pala
- Palakkad
- Pandalam
- Panoor
- Paravoor (South)
- Parappanangadi
- Pathanamthitta
- Pattambi
- Payyannur
- Payyoli
- Perinthalmanna
- Perumbavoor
- Piravom
- Ponnani
- Punalur
- Ramanattukara
- Shoranur
- Sreekandapuram
- Sultan Bathery
- Taliparamba
- Tanur
- Thalassery
- Thiruvalla
- Thodupuzha
- Thrikkakara
- Thripunithura
- Tirur
- Tirurangadi
- Vaikom
- Valanchery
- Varkala
- Vatakara
- Wadakkancherry

== Demographics ==
Demographics of Kerala
Economy of Kerala
Religions of Kerala

- Tourism
- Education
  - colleges and universities

== Government and politics of Kerala ==
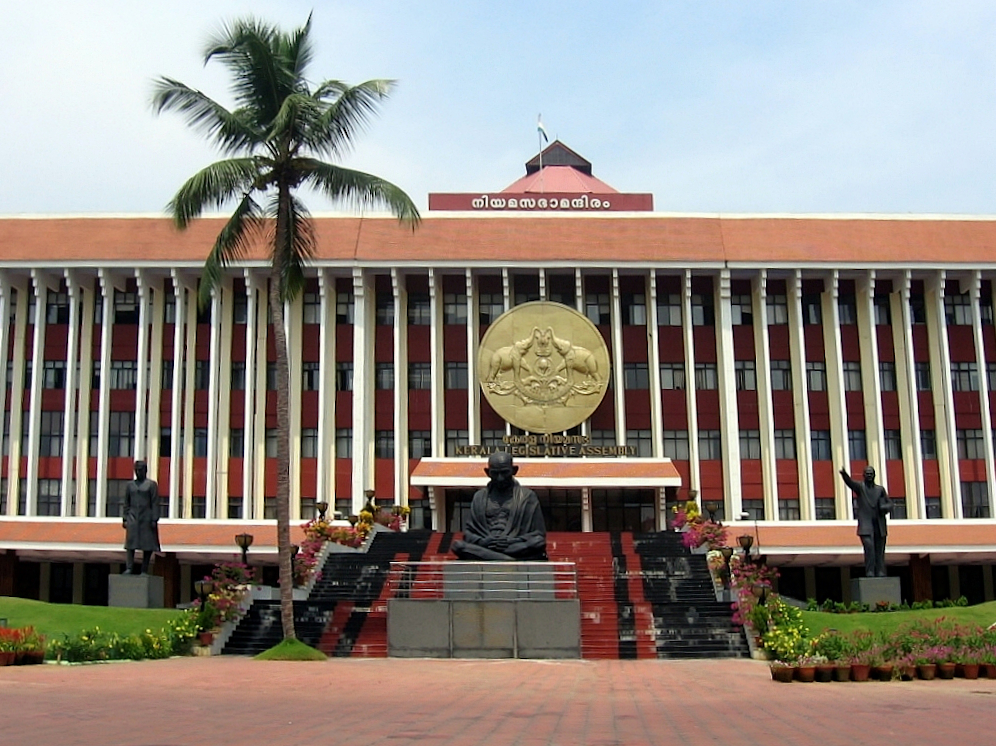
The Kerala Legislative Assembly Building in Thiruvananthapuram

- Government of Kerala
  - Form of government: Indian state government
  - Capital of Kerala: Thiruvananthapuram
  - Elections in Kerala
- Local government in Kerala
  - Municipalities in Kerala
  - Municipal corporations in Kerala
  - Kerala State Election Commission
- Politics of Kerala
  - Political families of Kerala
  - Political parties in Kerala
    - Left Democratic Front
    - United Democratic Front
  - Politicians
  - Communism in Kerala

=== Branches of the government of Kerala ===
==== Executive branch of the government of Kerala ====
- Head of state: Governor of Kerala,
- Head of government: Chief Minister of Kerala
- Kerala Council of Ministers
- Departments and agencies

==== Legislative branch of the government of Kerala ====
Kerala Legislative Assembly

- Constituencies of Kerala Legislative Assembly

==== Judicial branch of the government of Kerala ====
- High Court of Kerala

=== Law and order in Kerala ===
Law of Kerala

- Human rights in Kerala
  - LGBT rights in Kerala
- Law enforcement in Kerala
  - Kerala Police
    - Thiruvananthapuram City Police
    - Kollam City Police
      - Kollam Rural Police
    - Kochi City Police
    - Kozhikode City Police
    - Kannur City Police
    - Thrissur City Police
        - Police Dog Training Centre
    - Kerala Thunderbolts
    - Malabar Special Police
    - State Crime Branch
  - Kerala Excise
  - Kerala Forest and Wildlife Department
  - Kerala Motor Vehicles Department

== History of Kerala ==
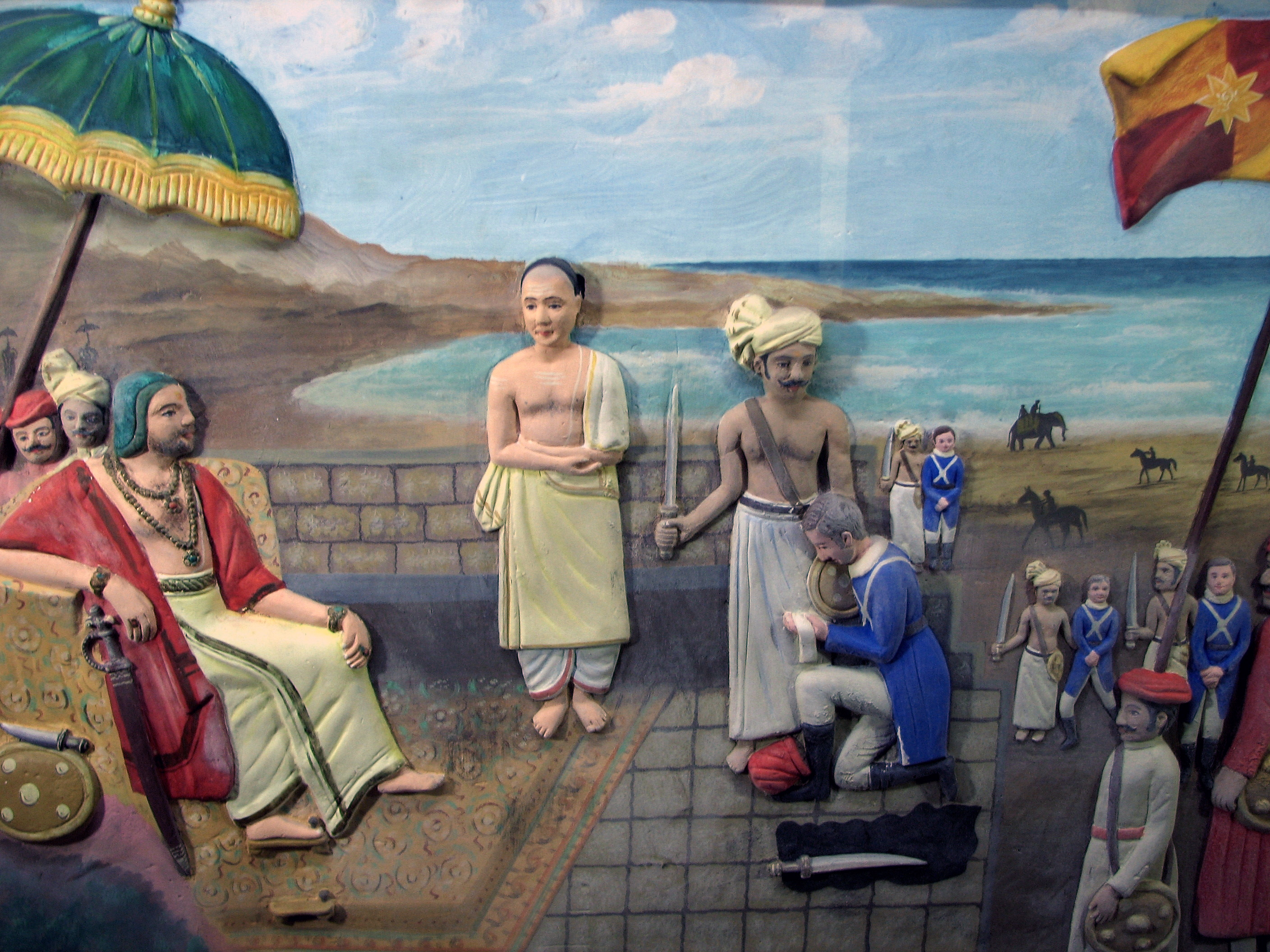
Dutch commander De Lannoy surrenders to Marthanda Varma at the Battle of Colachel. Depiction at Padmanabhapuram Palace

=== History of Kerala, by period ===
==== Prehistoric Kerala ====
- Edakkal Caves

==== Ancient Kerala ====
- Chera
- Sangam period

==== Medieval Kerala ====
- Kerala school of astronomy and mathematics

==== Colonial Kerala ====
- Battle of Kulachal
- Anglo-Mysore Wars
- Battle of Quilon

==== Contemporary Kerala ====
- Vaikom Satyagraham
- Malabar Migration
- Red rain in Kerala

=== History of Kerala, by region ===
==== Historical regions ====
- Kingdom of Travancore
- Kingdom of Calicut
- Kingdom of Valluvanad
- Kingdom of Cannanore (Kolathunadu)
- Malabar District
- North Malabar
- South Malabar
- Kingdom of Quilon (Venad)
- Kingdom of Cochin
- Kingdom of Tanur

=== History of Kerala, by cities ===
- History of Trivandrum
- History of Calicut
- History of Cannanore
- History of Cochin
- History of Kasargode
- History of Malappuram
- History of Quilon
- History of Trichur

=== History of Kerala, by subject ===
- Travancore
- Tharavad

== Culture of Kerala ==
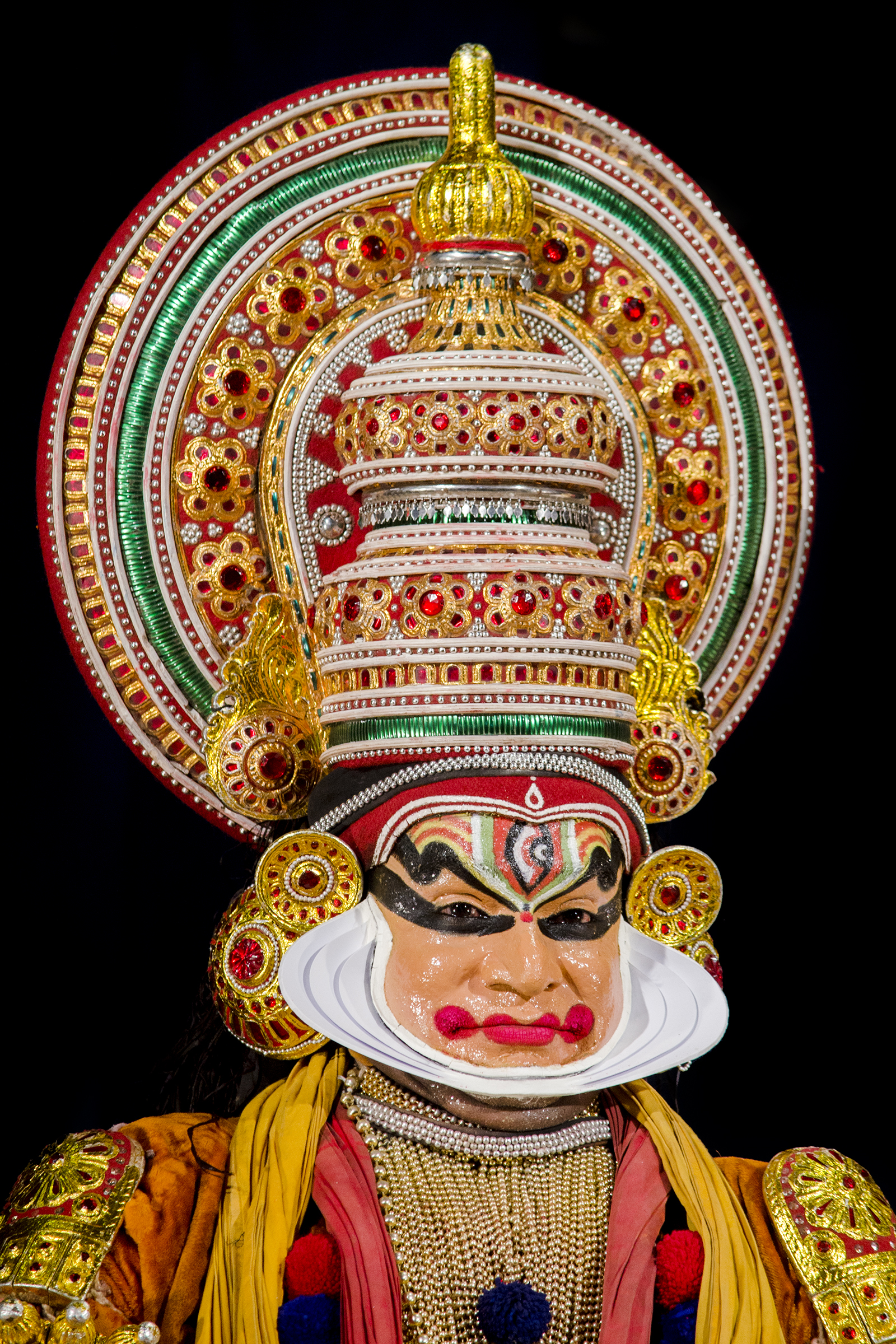
A Kathakali artist

During Onam, Kerala's biggest celebration, Keralites create pookkalam (floral carpet) designs in front of their houses.

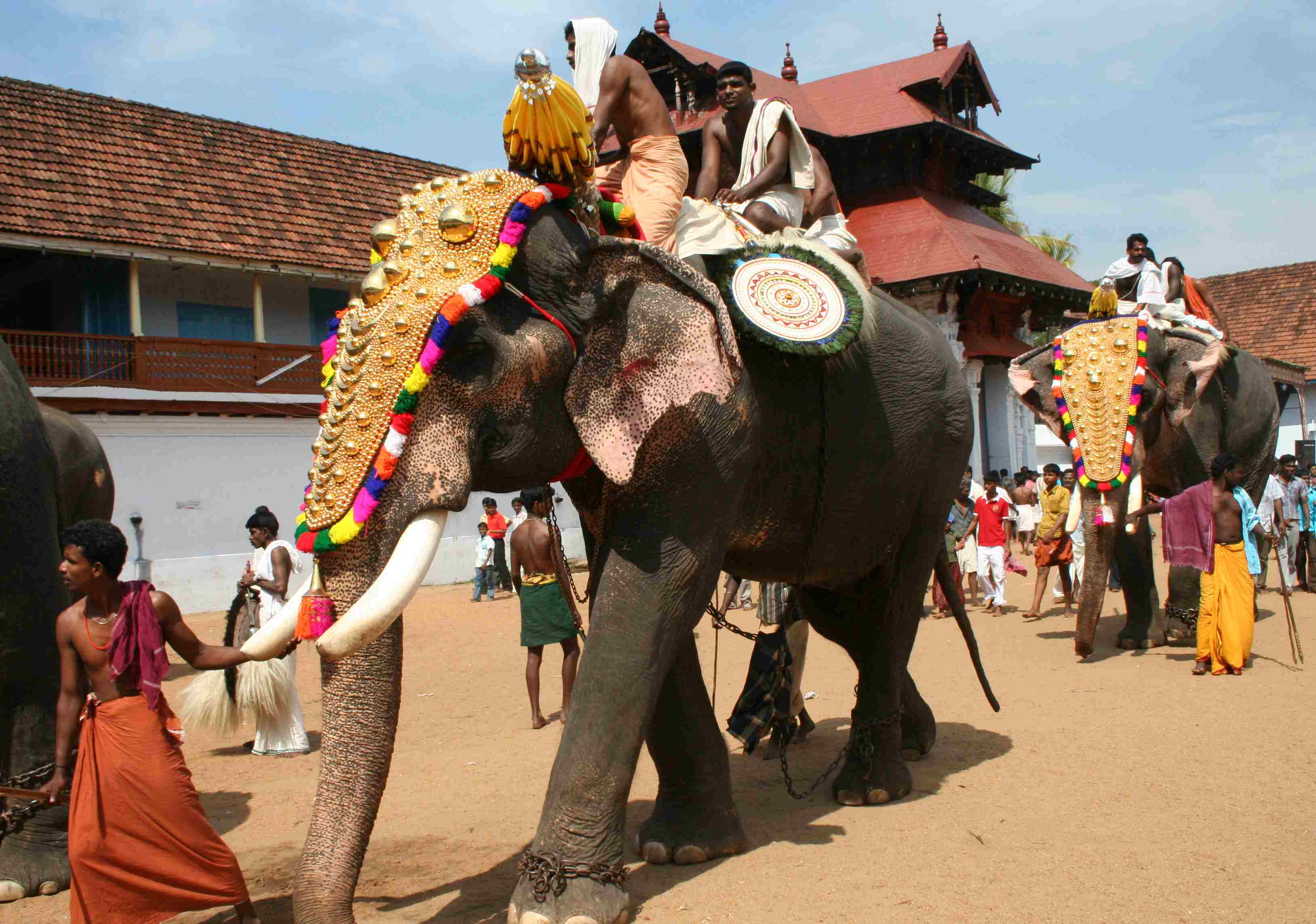
Keralite elephants, caparisoned, during the Sree Poornathrayesa Temple festival.

- Architecture of Kerala
- Cuisine of Kerala
- Martial arts in Kerala
  - Kalarippayattu
- Media in Kerala
- Monuments in Kerala
  - Monuments of National Importance in Kerala
  - State Protected Monuments in Kerala
- World Heritage Sites in Kerala

=== Art in Kerala ===
- Kerala mural painting

==== Cinema of Kerala ====
- International Film Festival of Kerala
- Kerala State Film Award

==== Art forms of Kerala ====
- Kathakali
- Kolkali
- Mohiniyattam
- Margamkali
- Ottamthullal
- Theyyam
- Koodiyattam
- Chavittu Nadakam
- Oppana

==== Literature of Kerala ====
- Triumvirate poets of modern Malayalam

==== Music of Kerala ====
- Chenda (Thayambaka)
- Kolkali
- Panchari melam
- Panchavadyam
- Sopanam

=== Festivals in Kerala ===
- Vishu
- Onam
- Pooram
- Temple festivals of Kerala

=== Languages in Kerala ===
- Malayalam language
- Malayalam calendar
- Tamil Language, Dialect of Palakkad Tamil & Southern Kerala Tamil (Idukki,Thiruvananthapuram Regions)
- Tulu Language, Kasaragod Region
- Mappila dialect of Malayalam, Malappuram & Kozhikode Regions
- Judeo-Malayalam
- Irula language

=== People of Kerala ===
- Malayalis
- Tamils,Tamils of Kerala/Malayala Tamilians
- Tuluvas,Tuluvas of Kerala
- Ezhavas
- Thiyyas
- Nairs
- Pulayar
- Kuravar
- Parayar/Sambavar
- Namboothiris
- Mukkuvar
- Latin Catholics
- Ambalavasis
- Samanthas
- Saint Thomas Christians
- Mappilas
- Kerala Iyers
- Nadars,Tamil Nadars of Southern Kerala
- Jacobites
- Knanaya Christians
- Cochin Jews
- Dravidians
- Adivasis
- Malavettuvan
- Scheduled Tribes

=== Religion in Kerala ===
- Hinduism in Kerala
- Christianity in Kerala
- Islam in Kerala
- Jainism in Kerala
- Sarpam Thullal

=== Sports in Kerala ===
  - Kerala Cricket Association
  - Kerala cricket team
  - Kerala Football Association
  - Kerala football team
- Vallam Kali (boat race)

=== Symbols of Kerala ===
- State animal: Indian elephant
- State fruit: Jackfruit
- State bird: Great hornbill
- State fish: Karimeen
- State flower: Golden shower
- State seal: Seal of Kerala
- State tree: Coconut

=== Tourism ===
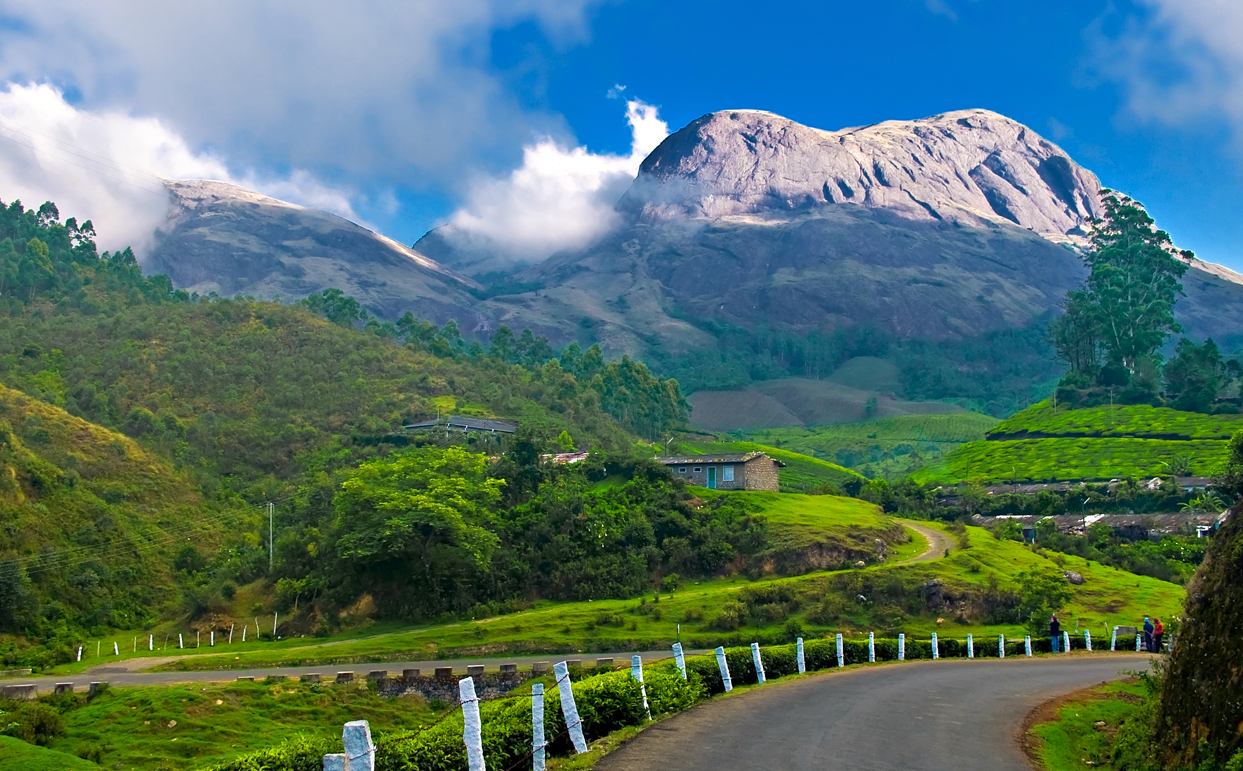
Munnar hill station in Idukki district

- Alappuzha
- Athirappilly Falls
- Beaches in Kerala
- Estuaries of Paravur
- Kerala Backwaters
- Kollam
- Kovalam
- Kumarakom
- Munnar
- Tourism in Thiruvananthapuram
- Vallamkali
- Wayanad
- Bekal

== Economy and infrastructure of Kerala ==
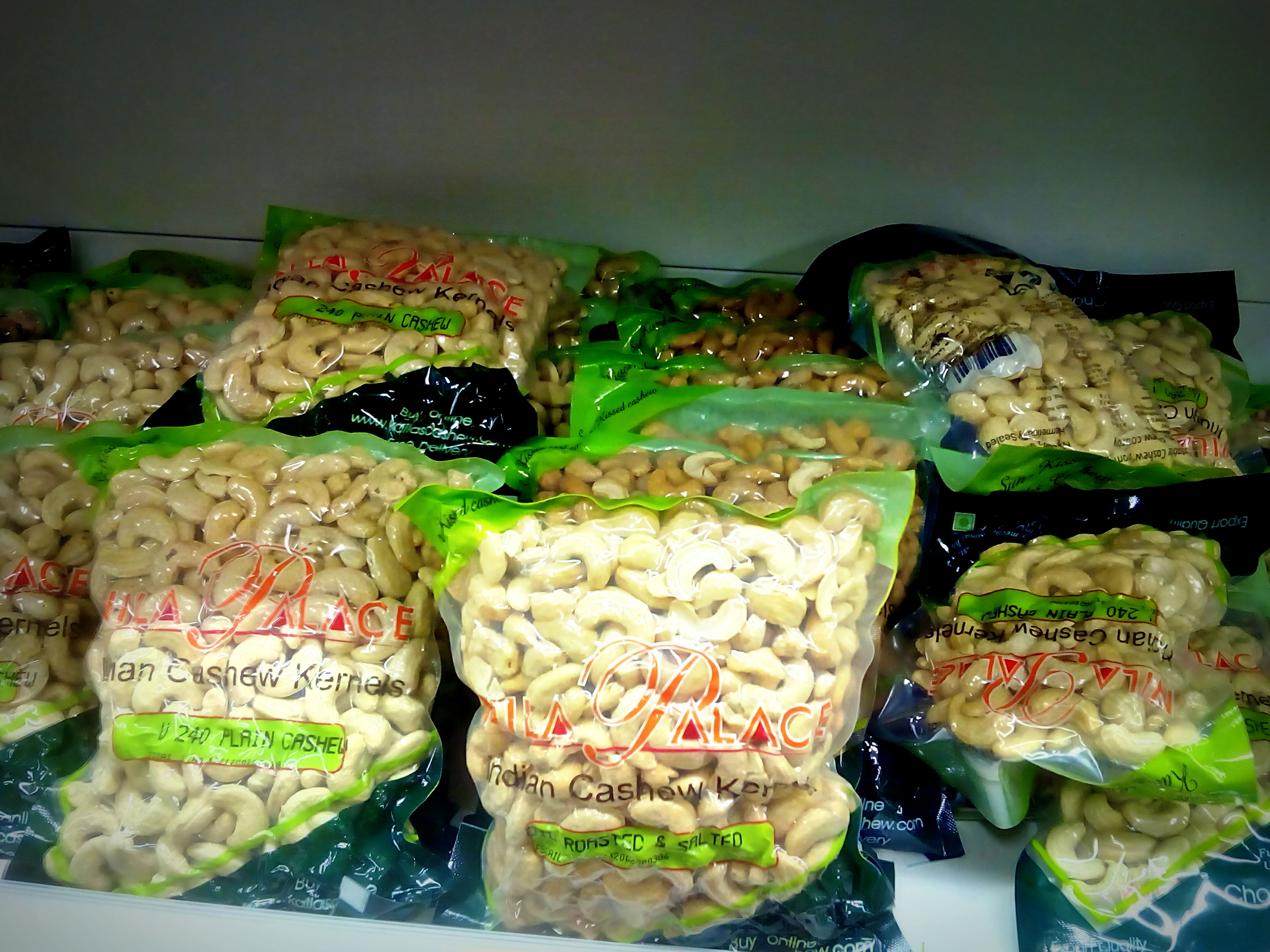
Cashew packets displayed in a Supermarket at Kollam. Kollam is a major exporter of cashews

- Banking in Kerala
- Cashew Business
- Economic development in Kerala
  - Kerala model
- Tourism in Kerala
- Transport in Kerala
  - Airports in Kerala
  - Rail transport in Kerala
  - Roads in Kerala
- Water supply and sanitation in Kerala
  - Dams and reservoirs in Kerala

== Education in Kerala ==
- Institutions of higher education in Kerala
