= Banking in Kerala =

Lines of business

Banking was one of the most preferred lines of business in the princely states of Travancore and Cochin, and the Malabar Province of British India — the area that later became the state of Kerala — during the twentieth century. A list of some of the banks that operated in the region during the twentieth century are given below. Due to various reasons, most of them were either closed or amalgamated with other banks, leaving only a handful now.

== Existing Banks ==
- CSB Bank (formerly known as Catholic Syrian Bank Ltd) — 1920 to Present
- Dhanlaxmi Bank (known as Dhanalakshmi Bank before name change in 2010) — 1927 to Present
- ESAF Small Finance Bank — 2017 to Present
- Federal Bank — (In 1931 originally known as Travancore Federal Bank)
- Kerala Bank
- Kerala Gramin Bank — 2013 to Present
- South Indian Bank — 1929 to Present

== Defunct Banks ==
- Aleppey Bank — 1919–1964 (Amalgamated with Federal Bank)
- Bank of Cochin — 1928–1985 (Amalgamated with State Bank of India)
- Bank of Kerala — 1944–1961 (Amalgamated with Canara Bank)
- Bank of New India — 1944–1961 (Amalgamated with State Bank of Travancore)
- Catholic Bank — ... 1938–1961 (Amalgamated with Syndicate Bank)
- Chalakudy Public Bank — 1929–1964 (Amalgamated with Federal Bank)
- Chaldean Syrian Bank — 1918–1965 (Amalgamated with State Bank of Travancore)
- Champkulam Catholic Bank Ltd. — 1929–964 (Amalgamated with State Bank of Travancore)
- Cochin Nayar Bank — 1929–1964(Amalgamated with State Bank of Travancore)
- Cochin Union Bank — 1932–1964 (Amalgamated with Federal Bank Ltd)
- Kottayam Orient Bank — 1926–1961 (Amalgamated with State Bank of Travancore)
- Latin Christian Bank — 1927–1964 (Amalgamated with State Bank of Travancore)
- Lord Krishna Bank — 1940–2006 (Amalgamated with Centurion Bank of Punjab)
- Marthandom Commercial Bank Ltd — 1950–1968 (Amalgamated with Federal Bank)
- Nedungadi Bank Ltd — 1899–2003 (Amalgamated with Punjab National Bank)
- North Malabar Gramin Bank — 1975–2013 (Amalgamated with South Malabar Gramin Bank to form Kerala Gramin Bank)
- Palai Central Bank — 1927–60 (Liquidated by High Court of Kerala on the request of Reserve Bank of India)
- Mukkattukara Catholic Bank Ltd — 1964 (Amalgamated with South Indian Bank)
- Quilon Bank Ltd — 1919–1937 (Amalgamated to form Travancore National & Quilon Bank Ltd, and later liquidated)
- South Malabar Gramin Bank — 1975–2013 (Amalgamated with North Malabar Gramin Bank to form Kerala Gramin Bank-2013)
- St George Union Bank — 1927–1965 (Amalgamated with Federal Bank)
- State Bank of Travancore (originally known as Travancore Bank Ltd) — 1945–2017 (Amalgamated with the State Bank of India)
- The City Bank — 1926–unknown
- Thiya Bank — 1945-1964 (Amalgamated with Lord Krishna Bank)
- Travancore Forward Bank — 1929–1961 (Amalgamated with State Bank of Travancore)
- Travancore National Bank — ... –1937 (Amalgamated to form Travancore National & Quilon Bank Ltd; later liquidated)
- Travancore National & Quilon Bank — 1937–38 (Liquidated by Travancore Government)
- Vasudeva Vilasom Bank Limited — 1930–1963 (Amalgamated with State Bank of Travancore)
- Venadu Bank Ltd — 1934–1961 (Amalgamated with South Indian Bank)
