= North Malabar Gramin Bank =

Regional bank in India

- Type: Public Sector Bank, sponsored by Syndicate Bank
- Industry: Financial; Commercial banks
- Founded: 1976, under the Regional Rural Banks Act, 1976
- Defunct: 7 July 2013
- Successor: Kerala Gramin Bank
- Headquarters: Kannur, Kerala, India
- Website: www.nmgbank.com

North Malabar Gramin Bank (NMGB) was a Regional Rural Bank in Kerala, India. It was established in 1976 as a Scheduled Commercial Bank under the Regional Rural Banks Act to provide banking facilities in the North Malabar region. It operated in seven districts of Kerala with the headquarters at Kannur, and had 222 branches as of 14 June 2013. The bank was one of the few profit-making RRBs in India before its amalgamation.

On 8 July 2013, per a Government of India notification, North Malabar Gramin Bank (sponsored by Syndicate Bank) and South Malabar Gramin Bank (sponsored by Canara Bank) were amalgamated into a single entity as the Kerala Gramin Bank, with its head office at Malappuram, and Canara Bank as the sponsor bank, after consulting NABARD, the concerned sponsor banks and the Government of Kerala.

== Board of directors ==
The bank's board of directors had the following members before its amalgamation into Kerala Gramin Bank:

- P. Madhu, Chairman
- Tapan Kumar Pradhan
- V. Asokan
- P. Dinesh

== See also ==
- Kerala Gramin Bank
- Kerala Bank
