= Kodaly (disambiguation) =

Kodaly may refer to:

- Zoltán Kodály (1882–1967), a Hungarian composer, ethnomusicologist, pedagogue, linguist, and philosopher
  - Kodály körönd is a circus in Budapest, Hungary, named after the composer
  - Kodály körönd (Budapest Metro), a metro station in Budapest, Hungary
- Kodaly, Thrissur, a village in Thrissur district, in the state of Kerala, India
