= Chattikulam Chalakudy =

Chattikulam Chalakudy Chettikulam Kodassery
- village
- Interactive map of Chattikulam Chalakudy
- Coordinates: 10°20′34″N 76°23′42″E
- Country: India
- State: Kerala
- District: Thrissur
- Elevation: 9 m (30 ft)

Population (2011)
  - Total: 12,575

Languages
  - Official: Malayalam, English
- Time zone: UTC+5:30 (IST)
- PIN: 680721
- Telephone code: 0480-2744319
- Nearest city: Kochi
- Lok Sabha constituency: Chalakudy

Chattikulam is a small high range village near Chalakudy in Thrissur district, Kerala, India. It is 9 km from Chalakudy on the way to Vellikulangara.

== Timber depot ==
A timber depot is located in Chattikulam and this is the heart of this village.

== Administration ==
The kodassery grama panchayath and Chattikulam village office is located near to the Timber Depot.

Chattikulam has one forest nursery. This village has one Post office and post code is 680721.

== Demographics ==
Population of 12,575, 5970 men and 6,605 women. Includes farmers, government employees, daily wage employees, etc..

== Education ==
This village has one nursery school or Anganvadi in tramway road towards thazhoor.

Chattikulam village comes under Chalakudy taluk.

== Economy ==
Left side irrigation canal from the Thumboormuzhi water reservoir passes through Chattikulam village.

== Transportation ==
Chattikulam check-post is the main junction in this village.

Private and public bus transportation facilities are available. Private cars and auto rickshaw's are available to hire.
