= Kodaly, Thrissur =

Kodaly
- village
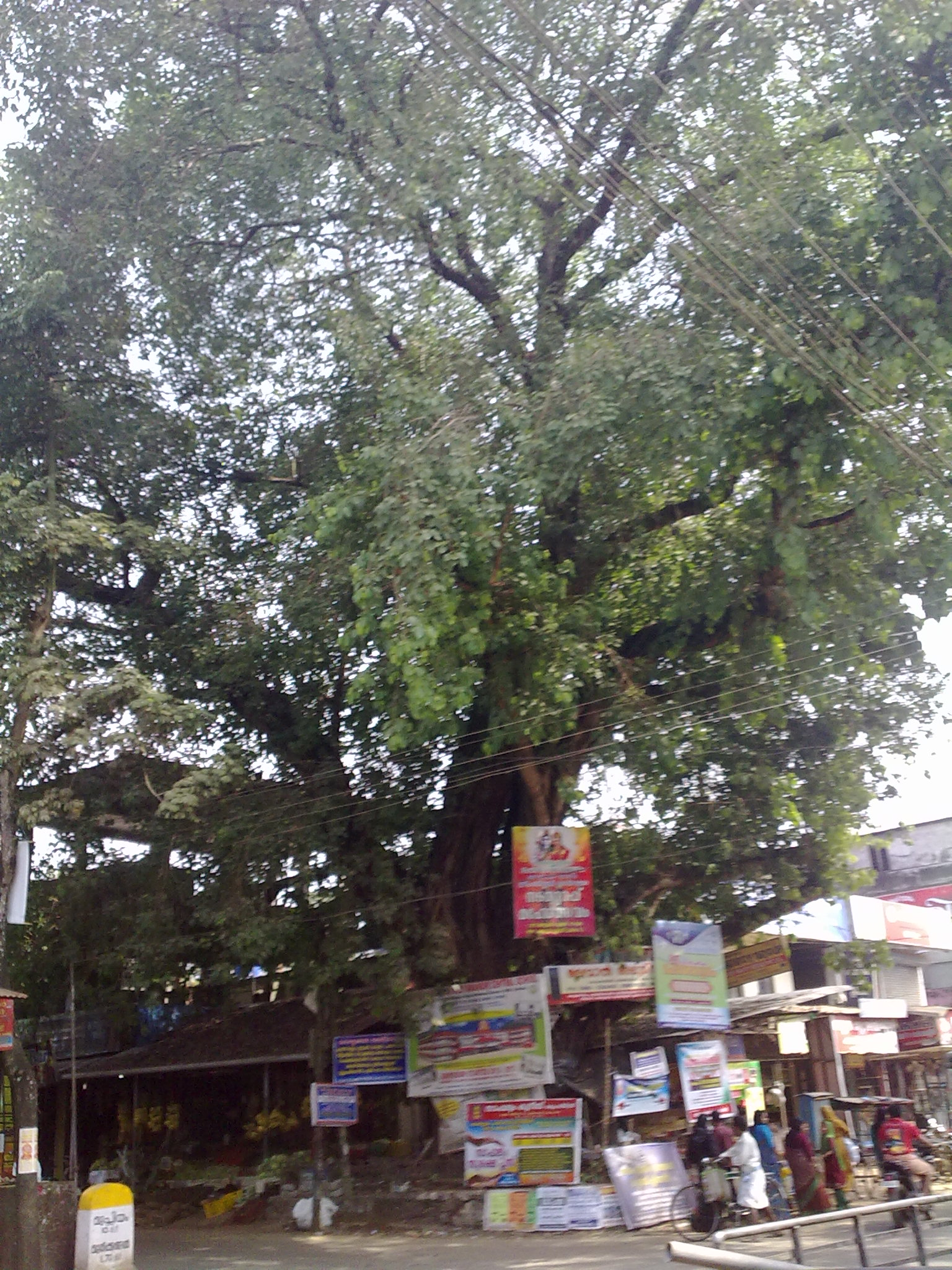
- Banyan Tree at Kodaly Junction.
- Country: India
- State: Kerala
- District: Thrissur

Languages
  - Official: Malayalam
- Time zone: UTC+5:30 (IST)
- PIN: 680699
- Vehicle registration: KL-64

Kodaly is a village in Thrissur district, in the state of Kerala, India. It is 30 km away from Thrissur city and 8 km from Kodakara and belongs to the Mattathur panchayath.

== Economy ==
This place acts as the local hub of trade and commerce for the people from the nearby villages.

The Kodakara - Vellikulangara road which can be used to reach Athirapilly and Chalakkudy passes through Kodaly. There is bus routes from here to Thrissur, Irinjalakkuda, Chalakkudy, Varandarappilly, Ernakulam, Angamaly, etc.

The villages near by Kodaly are Kizhekke Kodaly (East Kodaly), Chembuchira, Mankuttyppadam, Kadambode, Chelakkattukara, Moonnumury, Murukkingal, Thalooppadam, Perumpilly Chira, Inchakundu, Vellikullangara etc.

State Bank of India, Federal Bank, Canara Bank, South Indian Bank, Kerala Gramin Bank, Kerala Bank has Branches here. The Post office here is addressed as P.O.Pady.

== Landmarks ==
Some of the landmarks of Kodaly are

- Edayatt Srikrishnan Temple
- Aalthara Junction
- Government L.P.School
- Government community Health Center
- Sports Ground
- Indian Oil Petrol Pump
- Hotel Ceaser palace (3 Star)
- Sree Narayana Vidya Mandir Central School
- St.Sebastian's Chapel, Kodaly.
- Market Junction, Kodaly.
- Annampadam Junction
- Sri rudhhiramala bagavathy temple
- Sreelakshmi movies 2K
- Kerala State beverages cooperation outlet
- Juma masjid Kodaly
