= South Malabar Gramin Bank =

Defunct bank in India

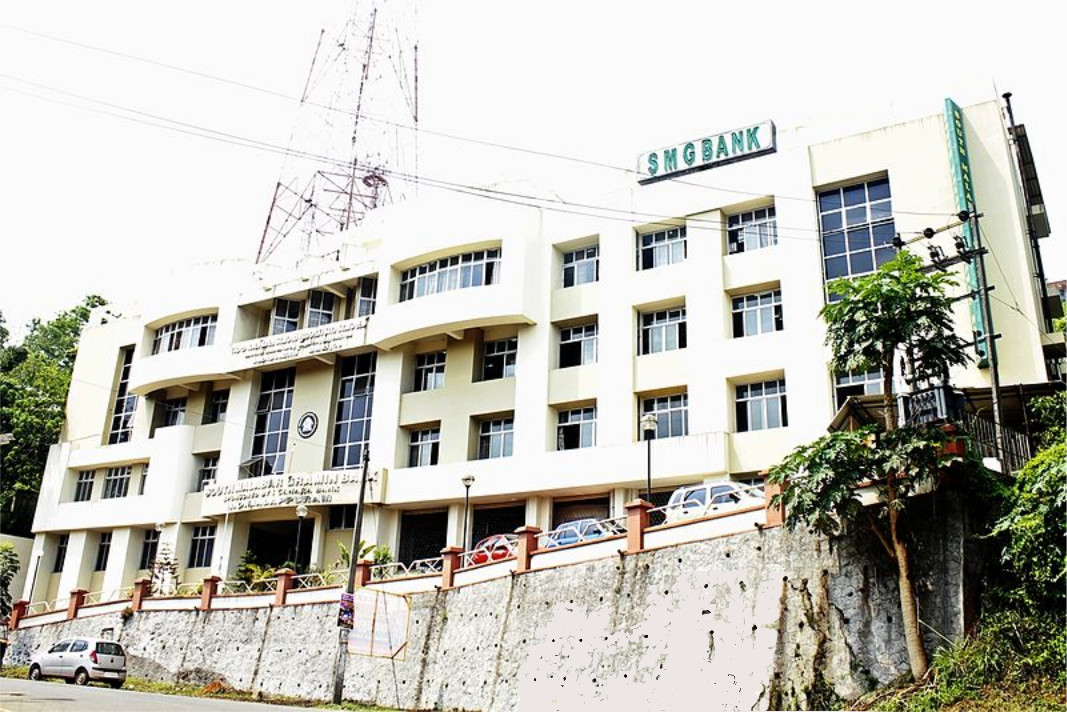
- Company type: Public Sector Bank, sponsored by Canara Bank
- Industry: Financial; Commercial banks
- Founded: Estd. under Regional Rural Banks Act 1976
- Defunct: 7 July 2013
- Successor: Kerala Gramin Bank
- Headquarters: Malappuram, Kerala, India
- Website: www.smgbank.com

South Malabar Gramin Bank Malappuram Kottakunnu (now Kerala Gramin Bank) was a Regional Rural Bank in India, and had its headquarters at Malappuram in Kerala. Its area of operation was limited to 8 districts in Kerala, India. It had been financing farm and non-farm sectors and other employment generation programs through its 506 branches spread over these 8 districts.

As per Government of India notification dated 08.07.2013, amalgamation of South Malabar Gramin Bank and North Malabar Gramin Bank sponsored by Syndicate Bank had been effected into a single entity as Kerala Gramin Bank with its head office at Malappuram and sponsor bank as Canara Bank after consulting NABARD, concerned sponsor banks and State government of Kerala. Government of India notification is effective from 08.07.2013

== See also ==
- Chelembra Bank Robbery
- Kerala Bank
