= Political families of Kerala =

List of Indian political families based in kerala

The list of political families of Kerala state of India:

== Families in INC ==
Oommen Chandy Family

- Oommen Chandy, Ex Chief Minister.
  - Chandy Oommen, Son, MLA

K. Karunakaran Family

- K. Karunakaran, Ex-CM.
  - K. Muraleedharan, Son, ex MP, Minister for Health, Family Welfare and Devaswoms.
  - Padmaja Venugopal, Daughter,

PT Chacko Family

- P. T. Chacko, ex Minister.
  - P. C. Thomas Son, ex Minister Of State,Govt.Of India. (Kerala Congress)

George Eden Family

- George Eden, ex MP.
  - Hibi Eden Son, MP.

P.T Thomas Family

- P. T. Thomas, ex MLA,ex MP
  - Uma Thomas Wife, MLA

G. Karthikeyan Family

- G. Karthikeyan, ex Speaker
  - K. S. Sabarinadhan, Son, ex MLA

Aryadan Family

- Aryadan Muhammed, ex Minister
  - Aryadan Shoukath, Son, MLA

== Families in CPIM ==
Pinarayi Vijayan Family

- Pinarayi Vijayan, Ex-CM.
  - P. A. Mohammed Riyas Son-In-Law, Ex-Minister.

A K Gopalan Family

- A K Gopalan, Ex-MLA.
  - Susheela Gopalan, Wife, Ex-Minister.
  - P. Karunakaran, Son-in-law, Ex-MP

E K Nayanar Family

- E K Nayanar, Ex-CM.
  - K. P. R. Gopalan Uncle-In-Law, Ex-MLA.

R Krishnan Family

- Alathoor R Krishnan, Ex-MLA.
  - K. D. Prasenan Grandson, Ex-MLA.

P K Kunjachan Family

- P. K. Kunjachan, Ex-MP.
  - A. K. Balan Son-in-law, Ex-Minister.

A Vijayaraghavan Family

- A. Vijayaraghavan, Ex-MP.
  - R. Bindu Wife, Ex-Minister.

O. Madhavan Family

- O. Madhavan, founding member
  - Mukesh, Son, Ex-MLA.

M Dasan Family

- M. Dasan, Ex-MLA.
  - P. Sathidevi, Wife Ex-MP.
  - P. Jayarajan, Brother-in-law, Ex-MLA

== Families in Kerala Congress factions ==
=== Kerala Congress ===
P.J.Joseph Family

- P. J. Joseph, ex minister.
  - Apu John Joseph, Son, MLA .

K M George Family

- K M George, ex Minister, Founder of Kerala Congress.
  - Francis George (politician) Son, MP.

=== Kerala Congress (M) ===
K.M. Mani Family

- K. M. Mani, ex minister.
  - Jose K. Mani, Son, Rajya Sabha MP.

K. Narayana Kurupp Family

- K. Narayana Kurup ex minister.
  - N. Jayaraj, Son, ex Chief Vip & MLA.

=== Kerala Congress (Jacob) ===
T. M. Jacob Family

- T.M.Jacob, ex Minister
  - Anoop Jacob, Son,Minister

=== Kerala Congress (B) ===
R Balakrishna Pillai Family

- R. Balakrishna Pillai, ex Minister.
  - Ganesh Kumar Son, Ex-MLA, ex Minister.

== Other families ==
C. H. Mohammed Koya Family (IUML)

- C. H. Mohammed Koya, ex Chief Minister.
  - M. K. Muneer, Son,ex minister

PC George Family (BJP)

- P. C. George, ex Chief Whip.
  - Shone George Son, State Vice President of BJP.

Baby John Family (RSP)

- Baby John, ex Minister
  - Shibu Baby John, Son,Minister.

R Prakasam Family

- R. Prakasam, ex MLA (CPI)
  - Jameela Prakasam, Daughter, ex MLA (JD (S))
  - Neelalohithadasan Nadar, Son-in-law, ex Minister (JD (S))
