= Lord Krishna Bank =

Defunct bank of India

- Type: Private
- Industry: Banking
- Founded: 1940
- Founder: Narayana Prabhu
- Defunct: 2007
- Fate: Merged
- Successor: Centurion Bank of Punjab
- Headquarters: Kodungallur, Thrissur district, Kerala, India
- Area served: India
- Products: Banking services

Lord Krishna Bank was a private sector bank headquartered in Kodungallur, Thrissur District, Kerala, India.

During the 1960s, Lord Krishna Bank expanded through the acquisition and merger of several commercial banks. Kerala Union Bank, established on 22 September 1952, merged with Thiyya Bank, founded in 1941, on 16 November 1964. Lord Krishna Bank subsequently merged with Josna Bank, which had been established in Cochin on 12 June 1944 by N. Govinda Pai and N. Lakshmana Pai. In 1961, Josna Bank had acquired the assets and liabilities of Tripunithura Union Bank, established in 1929. The merger of Josna Bank with Lord Krishna Bank took effect on 13 October 1965. Josna Bank had 14 branches at the time of the merger.

Lord Krishna Bank became a scheduled commercial bank in 1971. In 2007, Lord Krishna Bank was merged with Centurion Bank of Punjab.

== See also ==
- Kerala Bank
