= State Bank of Travancore =

Former associate bank of State Bank of India

- A Long Tradition of Trust
- Formerly: Travancore Bank Ltd.
- Company type: Public
- Traded as: NSE: SBT; BSE: 532191
- Industry: Banking; Capital Markets and allied industries
- Founded: 12 September 1945; 80 years ago (as Travancore Bank Ltd.)
- Founder: C. P. Ramaswami Iyer Chithira Thirunal Balarama Varma (official)
- Defunct: 31 March 2017
- Fate: Merged with State Bank of India
- Successor: State Bank of India
- Headquarters: Poojappura, Thiruvananthapuram, India
- Number of locations: 1,157 Branches, 12 Extension counters and 1,602 ATM Counters
- Area served: Kerala
- Services: Investment Banking; Consumer Banking; Commercial Banking; Retail Banking; Private Banking; Asset Management; Pensions; Mortgages
- Number of employees: 14,069 (2015)
- Parent: State Bank of India

The State Bank of Travancore (SBT) was a major Indian bank headquartered in Thiruvananthapuram, Kerala, and was a major associate of the State Bank of India.

SBT was a subsidiary of the State Bank Group, but also had private share-holders. It was the premier bank of Kerala. As of 31 March 2015, SBT had an overall network of 1,157 branches and 1,602 ATMs, covering 18 states and three union territories in India.

On 15 February 2017, the Union Cabinet approved a proposal to merge SBT and four other associate banks with SBI. It finally merged with its parent bank on 31 March 2017.

== History ==
=== Foundation ===
SBT was established in 1945 as the Travancore Bank Ltd., at the initiative of Travancore Diwan C. P. Ramaswami Iyer. Following popular resentment against his dictatorial rule, the bank never credited his role. Instead, the Bank considered the Maharaja of Travancore Sri Chithira Thirunal Balarama Varma as the founder, though the king had little to do with the founding. Although the Travancore government put up only 25% of the capital, the bank undertook government treasury work and foreign exchange business, apart from its general banking business. Its head office was at Thiruvananthapuram. In 1960, it became a subsidiary of State Bank of India under the SBI Subsidiary Banks Act, 1959, enacted by the Parliament of India., and thus achieved the name 'State Bank of Travancore'.

=== Merger ===
On 15 February 2017, the Union Cabinet approved a proposal to merge SBT and four other associate banks with State Bank of India. It was merged with its parent bank on 31 March 2017.

== Acquisitions ==
Between 1959 and 1965, SBT acquired numerous small, private banks in Kerala.

- 1959: SBT acquired the assets and liabilities of Indo-Mercantile Bank, which Sri Popatlal Goverdhan Lalan had helped found in Kochi in 1937.
- 1961: SBT acquired Travancore Forward Bank (est. 1929), Kottayam Orient Bank (est. 1926), and Bank of New India (est. 1944) after the Reserve Bank of India put the banks under moratorium.
- 1963: SBT acquired Vasudeva Vilasam Bank (est. 1930).
- 1964: SBT acquired Cochin Nayar Bank (est. 1929) and Latin Christian Bank (est. 1928 in Ernakulam), after the Reserve Bank of India put the banks under moratorium. It also acquired Champakulam Catholic Bank, which had been established in 1929 in Alappuzha.
- 1965: SBT acquired Bank of Alwaye (est. 1942), and Chaldean Syrian Bank, which several leading families of Syrian Christian origin had founded in 1918.

== See also ==
- Indian banking
- List of banks in India
- SBI Kerala (football team)
