= List of politicians from Kerala =

The following is a list of politicians from Kerala, a state in India.

Name	Image	Political parties associated	Constituency	Offices held
A
V.S. Achuthanandan		Communist Party of India (Marxist)	Malampuzha	
E. Ahamed	–			
K. R. Gouri Amma	–			
A.K. Antony	–			
B
E. Balanandan	–			
E. K. Imbichi Bava	–			
E. T. Muhammed Basheer	–			
Veliyam Bhargavan	–			
C
P. T. Chacko	–			
Oommen Chandy		Indian National Congress	Puthuppally	(31 August 2004 – 18 May 2006)
Ramesh Chennithala	–			
G
A. K. Gopalan/AKG (1904 - 1977)	–			
K.P.R. Gopalan	–			
Susheela Gopalan	–			
Chadayan Govindan (late)	–			
H
T.K. Hamza	–			
M. M. Hassan	–			
M. M. Hassan	–			
I
Thomas Isaac	–			
J
M. T. Jacob	–			
Sindhu Joy	–			
T.S. John	–			
P.J. Joseph	–			
K
K. Karunakaran				
C. Kesavan (1891 - 1969)	–			
C.H. Mohammed Koya (1927 - 1983)	–			
P. K. Kunhalikutty	–			
M
Vakkom Majeed (1909 - 2000)	–			
K.M. Mani	–			
Mathai Manjooran (1912 - 1970)	–			
C. Achutha Menon (1913 - 1991)	–			
V. K. Krishna Menon (1897 - 1974)	–			
Aryadan Muhammed	–			
K. Muraleedharan	–			
Joseph Mundassery (1903 - 1977)	–			
M. K. Muneer	–			
N
P.K. Vasudevan Nair (1926 - 2005)	–			
E.M.S. Namboodiripad (1909 - 1998)	–			
E.K. Nayanar (1919 - 2004)	–			
P
C.V. Padmarajan	–			
P. Govinda Pillai	–			
P. Krishna Pillai (1906 - 1948)	–			
Pattom A. Thanu Pillai (1885 - 1970)	–			
Vakkom Purushothaman	–			
V. N. Purushothaman (late)	–			
R
Azhikodan Raghavan	–			
M.V. Raghavan	–			
P. Rajendran	–			
Vayalar Ravi	–			
S
M. P. Abdussamad Samadani	–			
R. Sankar (1909 - 1972)	–			
Nalakath Soopy	–			
V.M. Sudheeran	–			
M. Swaraj	–			
T
T. V. Thomas	–			
V
T. M. Varghese	–			
Pinarai Vijayan	–		Chief Minister of Kerala (present)	
W
P.V. Abdul Wahab	–			

== See also ==
- List of political leaders from Kerala
- List of politicians from Bihar
