= History of Kasaragod =

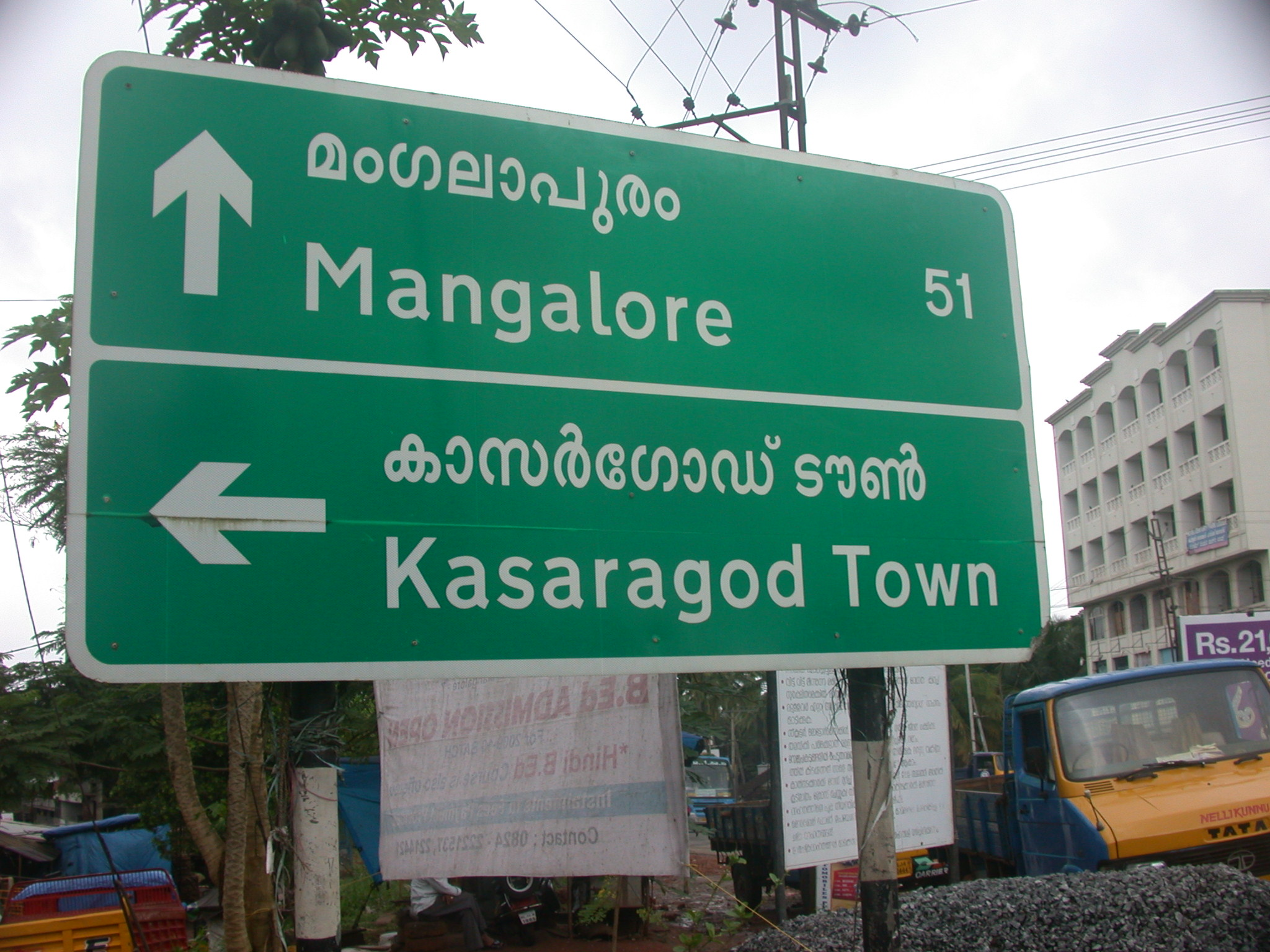
Road sign in Kasaragod town

Kasaragod District is the northernmost district in the southwestern Indian coastal state of Kerala. The district has a long history starting from pre-historic times to the modern period.

The district's northern border Thalappady is located just 10 km south to Mangalore on the southwestern Malabar coast of India. Kasaragod town is located on the estuary where the Chandragiri River, which is also the longest river in the district, empties into Arabian Sea.

The historic hill of Ezhimala is located on the southern portion of Kavvayi Backwaters of Nileshwaram. Kasaragod is home to several forts which include Arikady fort, Bekal Fort, Chandragiri Fort, and Hosdurg Fort (Puthiya Kotta fort). Bekal Fort is also the largest fort in Kerala.

Tulunad, where Tulu is traditionally spoken, is said to be bound on the south by the Chandragiri river and fort, thus including Kasaragod city within the Tulunad region.

Local bodies in Kasaragod district

== Ancient era ==
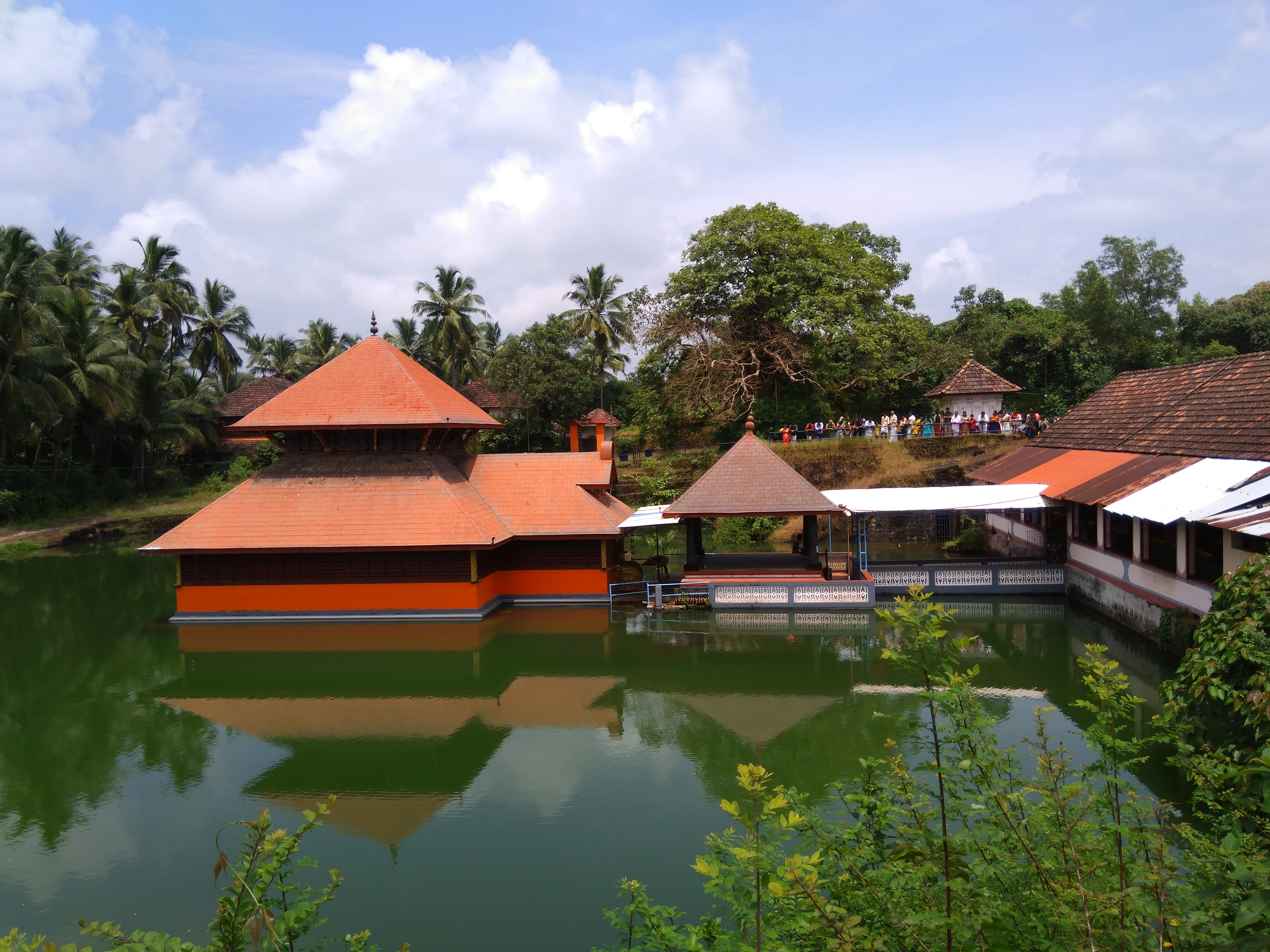
Ananthapadmanabhaswamy temple at Ananthapura, Kumbla

The Ancient Tamil Works of Sangam Age records that the area covering the district was part of Puzhinadu which consists of the coastal belt from Kozhikode to Mangalore. Politically the area was part of the Ezhimala Kingdom with its Capital at Ezhimala in present day Kannur district. The most famous King of Ezhimala was Nannan whose Kingdom extended up to Gudalur and northern parts of Coimbatore. Poozhinad, along with Karkanad which included the eastern regions of Ezhimala dynasty (Wayanad-Gudalur region with some portions of Kodagu), had its capital at Ezhimala. The Mooshaka kings were considered descendants of Nannan. By the 14th century, Mooshaka Kingdom was known as Kolathirinad and the rulers as Kolathiris.

The Kolathunad Kingdom at the peak of its power reportedly extended from Netravati River (Mangalore) in the north to Korapuzha (Kozhikode) in the south with Arabian Sea on the west and Kodagu hills on the eastern boundary, also including the isolated islands of Lakshadweep in Arabian Sea.

== Medieval era ==
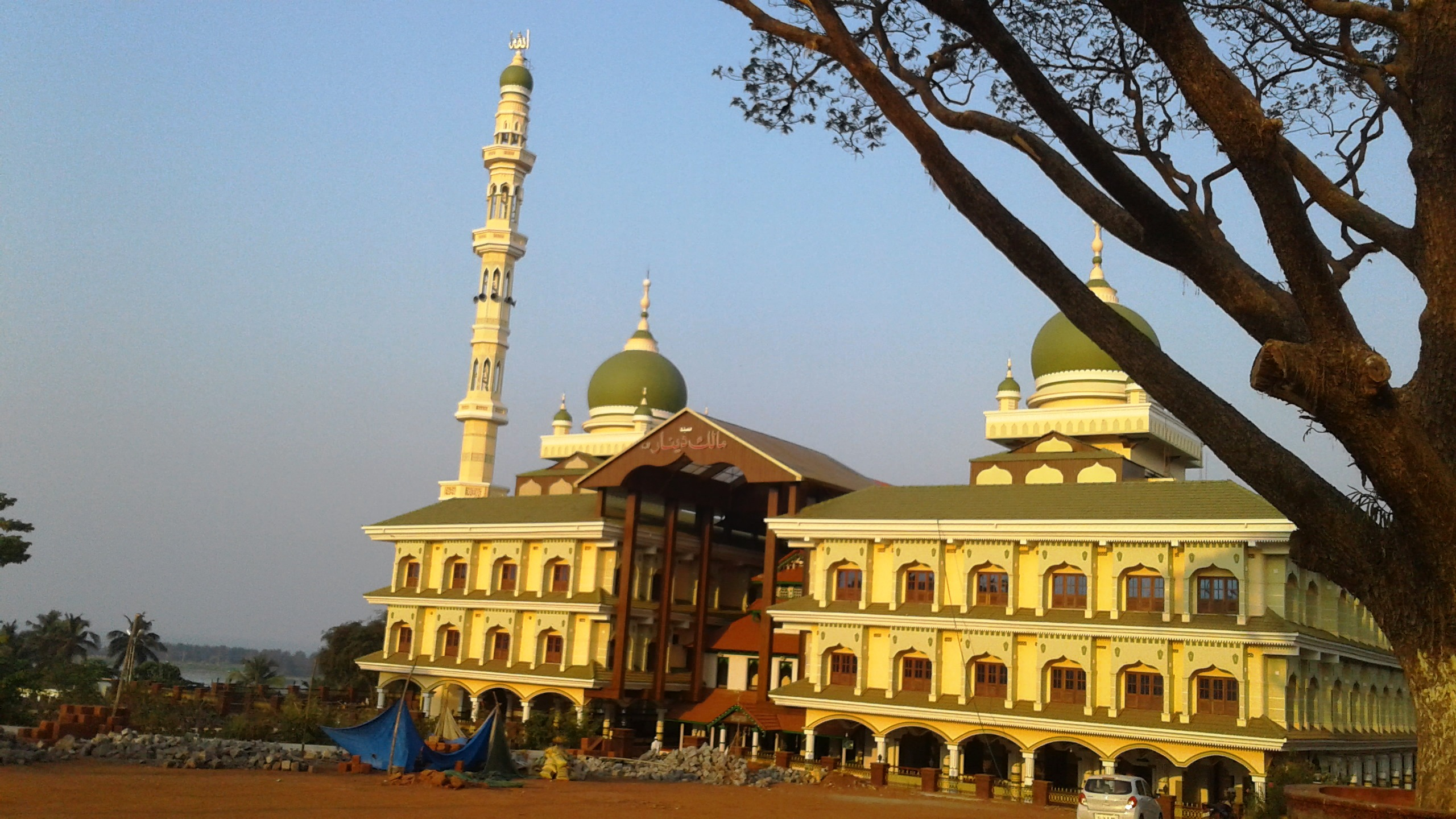
Malik Dinar Mosque, Thalangara, Kasaragod, is one of the oldest mosques in India.

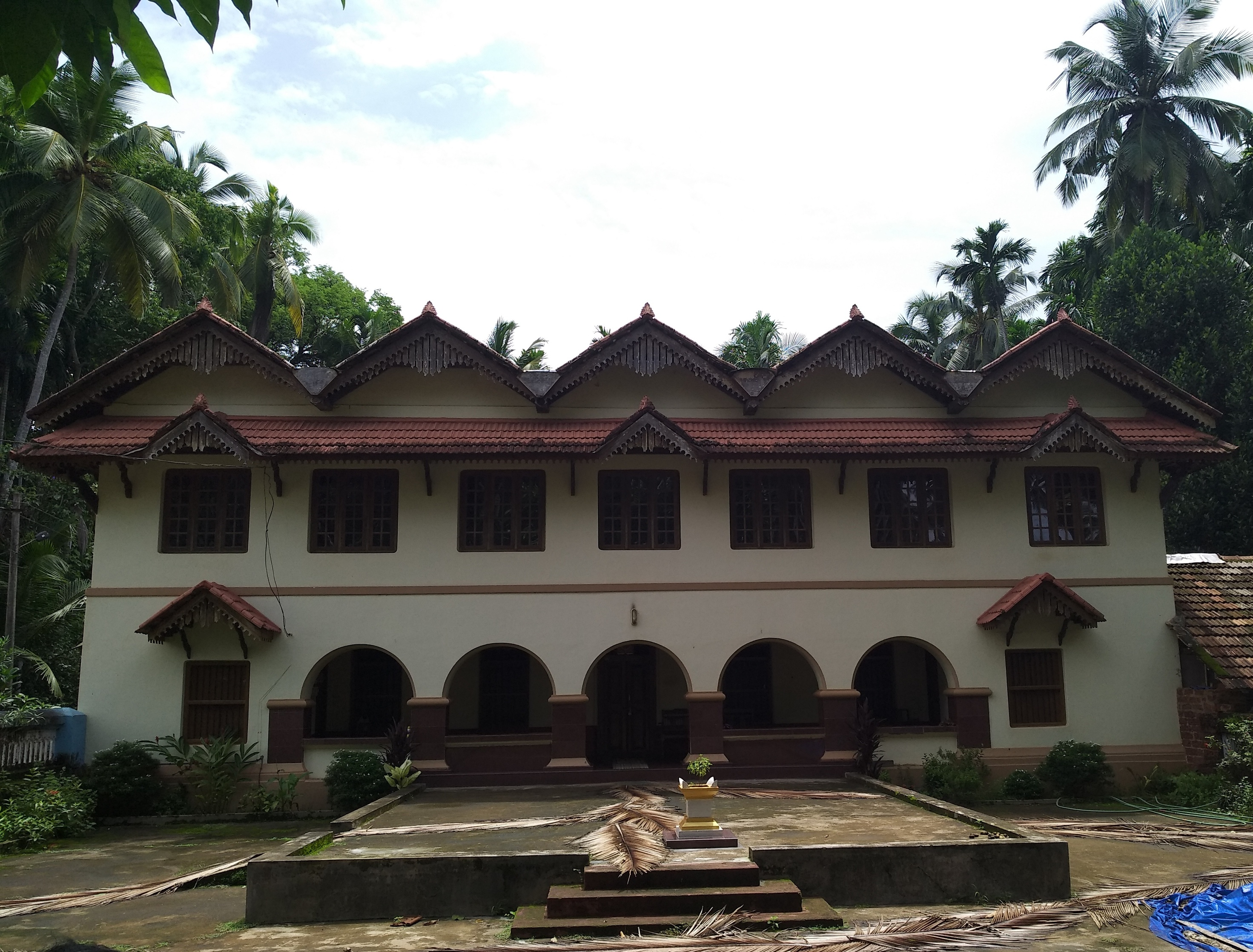
Maipady palace

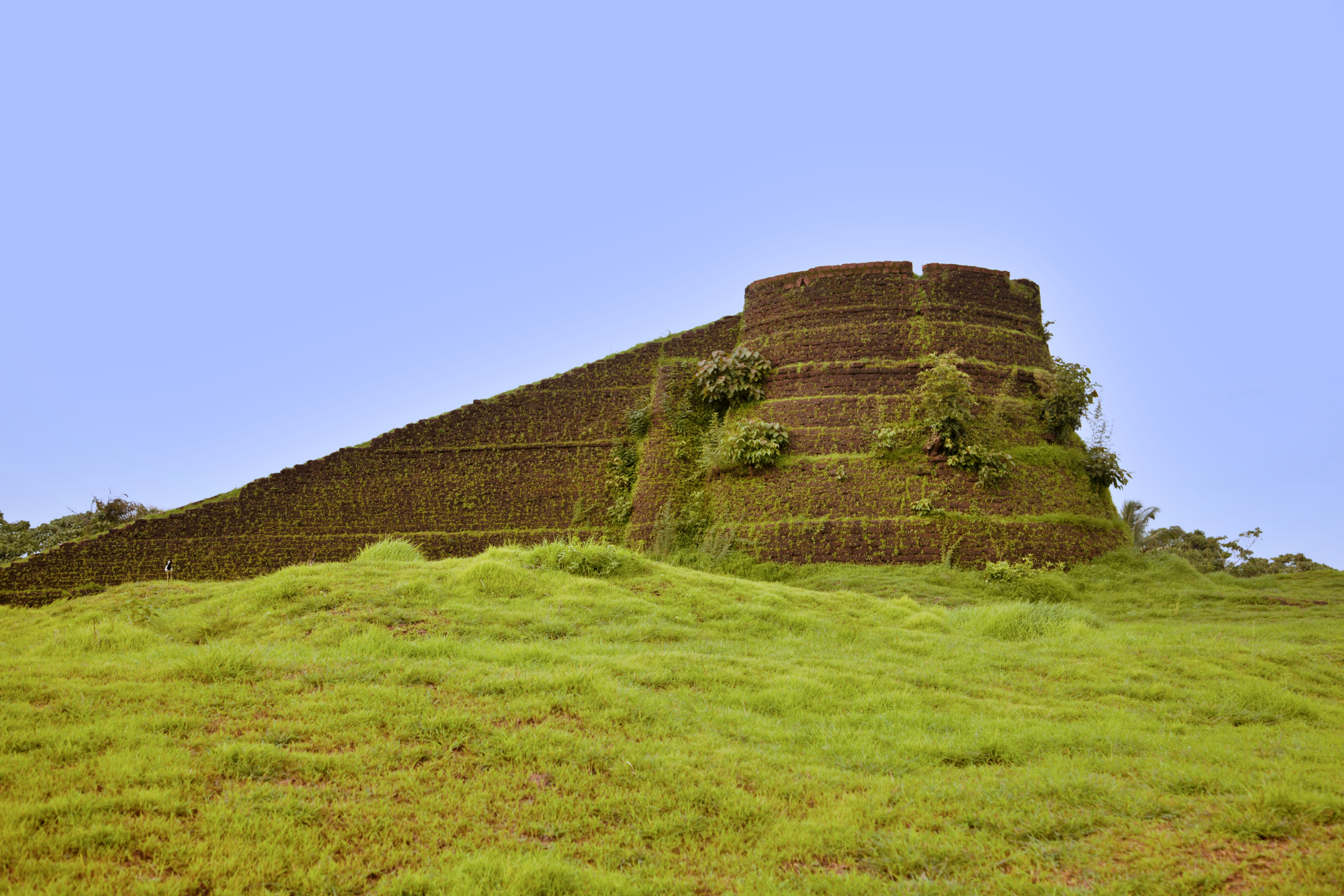
Arikady fort at Kumbla

Kasaragod, about 50 km south of Mangalore city, was an important centre of trade in earlier times. Ramacharitam, probably the oldest literary work written in Old Malayalam, which dates back to 12th century CE, is thought to have written in Kasargod district as its manuscripts were discovered from Nileshwaram and the poem mentions about Ananthapura Lake Temple in Kumbla in detail. Kasaragod was known to the Arabs by the name Harkwillia. The Malik Dinar Mosque in Kasaragod town is one of the oldest Masjids in the Indian subcontinent. According to Qissat Shakarwati Farmad, the Masjids at Kodungallur, Kollam, Madayi, Barkur, Mangalore, Kasaragod, Kannur, Dharmadam, Panthalayini, and Chaliyam, were built during the era of Malik Dinar, and they are among the oldest Masjids in Indian subcontinent. It is believed that Malik Dinar died at Thalangara in Kasaragod town. Many Arab travelers visiting Kerala between the 9th and the 14th centuries visited Kasaragod, which was an important trade centre then. Duarte Barbosa, a Portuguese traveler who visited Kumbla, near Kasaragod Town in 1514 recorded that rice being exported for coir to Maldives. According to Barbosa, the people in the southwestern Malabar coast of India from Kumbla in the north to Kanyakumari in the south had spoken a unique language, which they called as "Maliama" (Malayalam).

Until 16th century CE, Kasargod town was known by the name Kanhirakode (may be by the meaning, 'The land of Kanhira Trees') in Malayalam. The Kumbla dynasty, who swayed over the land of southern Tulu Nadu wedged between Chandragiri River and Netravati River (including present-day Taluks of Manjeshwar and Kasaragod) from Maipady Palace at Kumbla, had also been vassals to the Kolathunadu kingdom of North Malabar, before the Carnatic conquests of Vijayanagara Empire. The Kumbla dynasty had a mixed lineage of Malayali Nairs and Tuluva Brahmins. They also claimed their origin from Cheraman Perumals of Kerala. Francis Buchanan-Hamilton states that the customs of Kumbla dynasty were similar to those of the contemporary Malayali kings.

The Kolathiri Dominion emerged into ten independent principalities i.e., Kadathanadu (Vadakara), Randathara or Poyanad (Dharmadom), Kottayam (Thalassery), Nileshwaram, Iruvazhinadu (Panoor), Kurumbranad etc., under separate royal chieftains due to the outcome of internal dissensions. Many portions of the present-day Hosdurg taluk (Kanhangad) and Vellarikundu were parts of the Nileshwaram dynasty, who were relatives to both Kolathunadu as well as Zamorin of Calicut, in the early medieval period. The areas north to the Chandragiri river (present-day Taluks of Manjeshwaram and Kasaragod) were ruled by the Kumbala dynasty. According to local legends, the region between Talapadi and Kavvayi rivers which constituted the erstwhile Kasaragod taluk, consisted of 32 Tulu and 32 Malayalam villages.

Kannada kingdoms focused on Kasaragod in the 16th century CE. The Vijayanagara Empire attacked and annexed Kasaragod from the Kolathiri Raja with Nileshwaram as one of the capital in the 16th century. During the decline of the Vijayanagara Empire, the administration of this area was vested with Ikkeri Nayakas. At the onset of collapse of the Vijayanagara Empire, Venkappa Nayaka declared independence to Ikkery. Kumbla, Chandragiri, and Bekal are considered to be the chain of forts constructed or renovated by Shivappa Nayaka.

The Chandragiri Fort is built on the southern bank of the estuary of Chandragiri River, just opposite to Kasaragod town. The Bekal Fort at Bekal, Pallikkara, which is situated in the midway between Kasaragod and Kanhangad, and is also largest fort in Kerala, was built in 1650 by Shivappa Nayaka of Keladi.

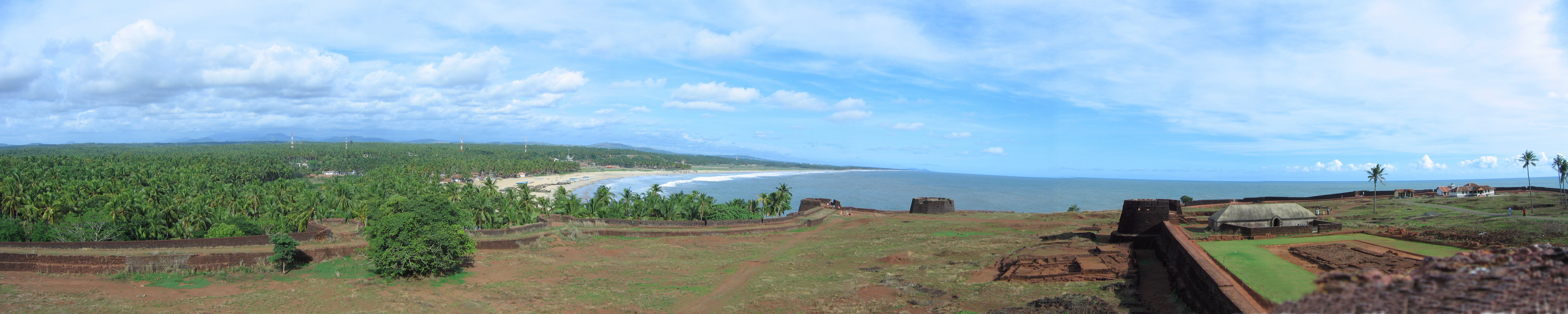
Panoramic view from inside Bekal Fort, the largest fort in Kerala

== Colonial era ==
Sunset at Valiyaparamba beach

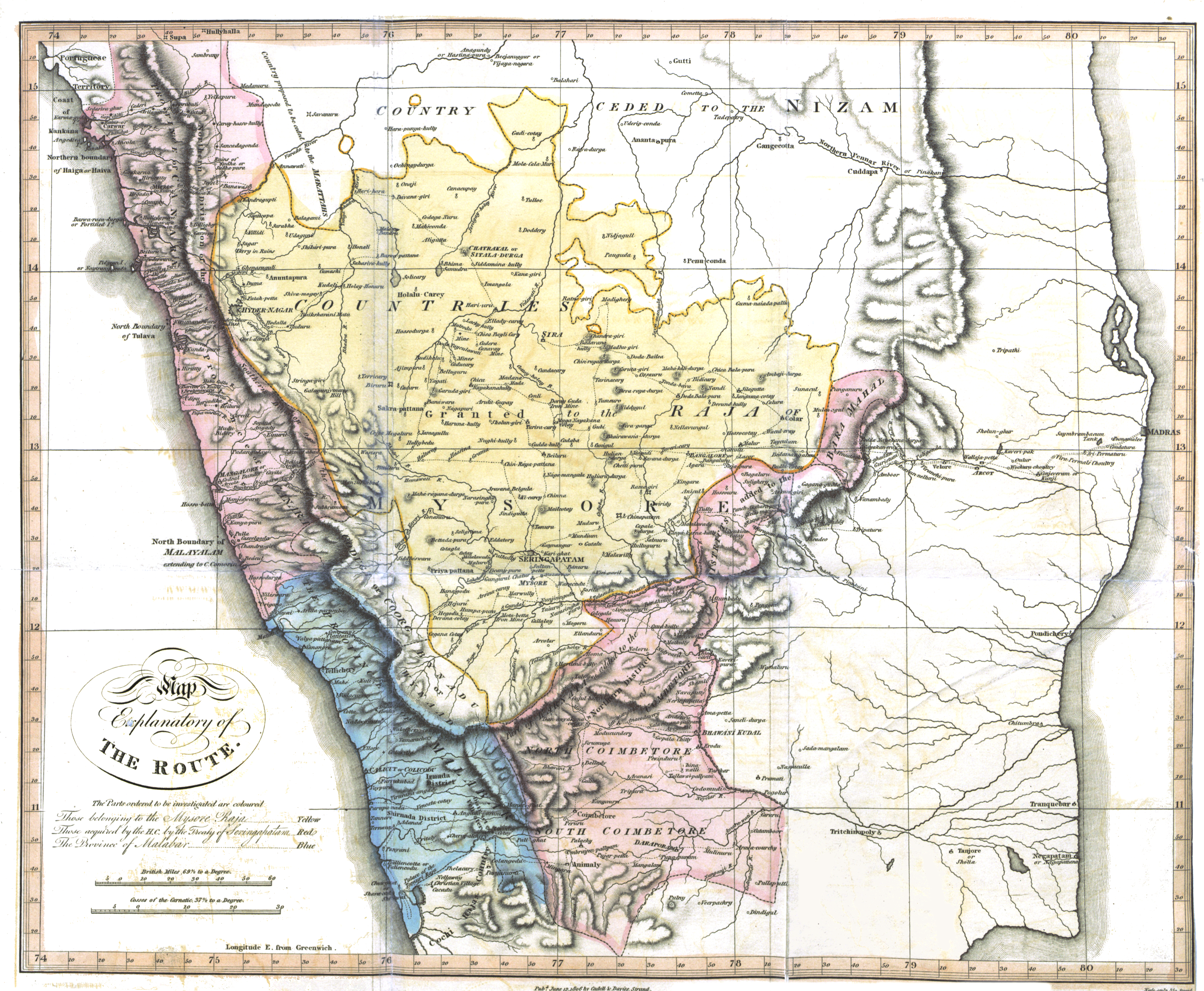
A map of Malabar District (Malayalam district) drawn by Francis Buchanan-Hamilton in 1807. The portion to the south of Kasaragod's Payaswini/Chandragiri river of British South Canara district was also included in the Malayalam region (just above the blue shaded region).

Francis Buchanan, the family doctor of Arthur Wellesley, visited Kasaragod in 1800. In his travelogue, he recorded information on places like Athiraparambu, Kavvayi, Nileshwaram, Bekal, Chandragiri and Manjeshwar. On 19 January 1801, Francis speaks of visiting a Siva temple at Pulla (Pallikere), beyond which, the country rises into open rising lands, all the way to Chandragiri river and Chandragiri fort, which he describes as the northern border of the Malayala. He says that the country on the north of the Chandragiri fort and river is called by Hindus as Tuluva, the Tulu country. In 1763, Hyder Ali raided Bedanoor (Bidnur), the capital of the Ikkery Naiks. His son Tippu Sultan raided much of Malabar region in Kerala. As per the Treaty of Seringapatam of 1792, Tippu surrendered Malabar, except Kanara to the British. The British occupied Kanara only after the death of Tippu Sultan. it is said that Kinavoor Molom (Sree Dharma Shashtha Temple) is belonging to Karinthalam (one of 64 Brahmin villages in old Kerala). Initially South Canara was placed under the Bombay presidency. Later on 16 April 1862, South Canara was transferred to Madras Presidency and Kasaragod taluk was formed by replacing the erstwhile Bekal taluk. Kasaragod was the second-most populated Taluk in South Canara only after to Mangalore taluk, and also the second-largest Taluk.

== Post-Independence ==
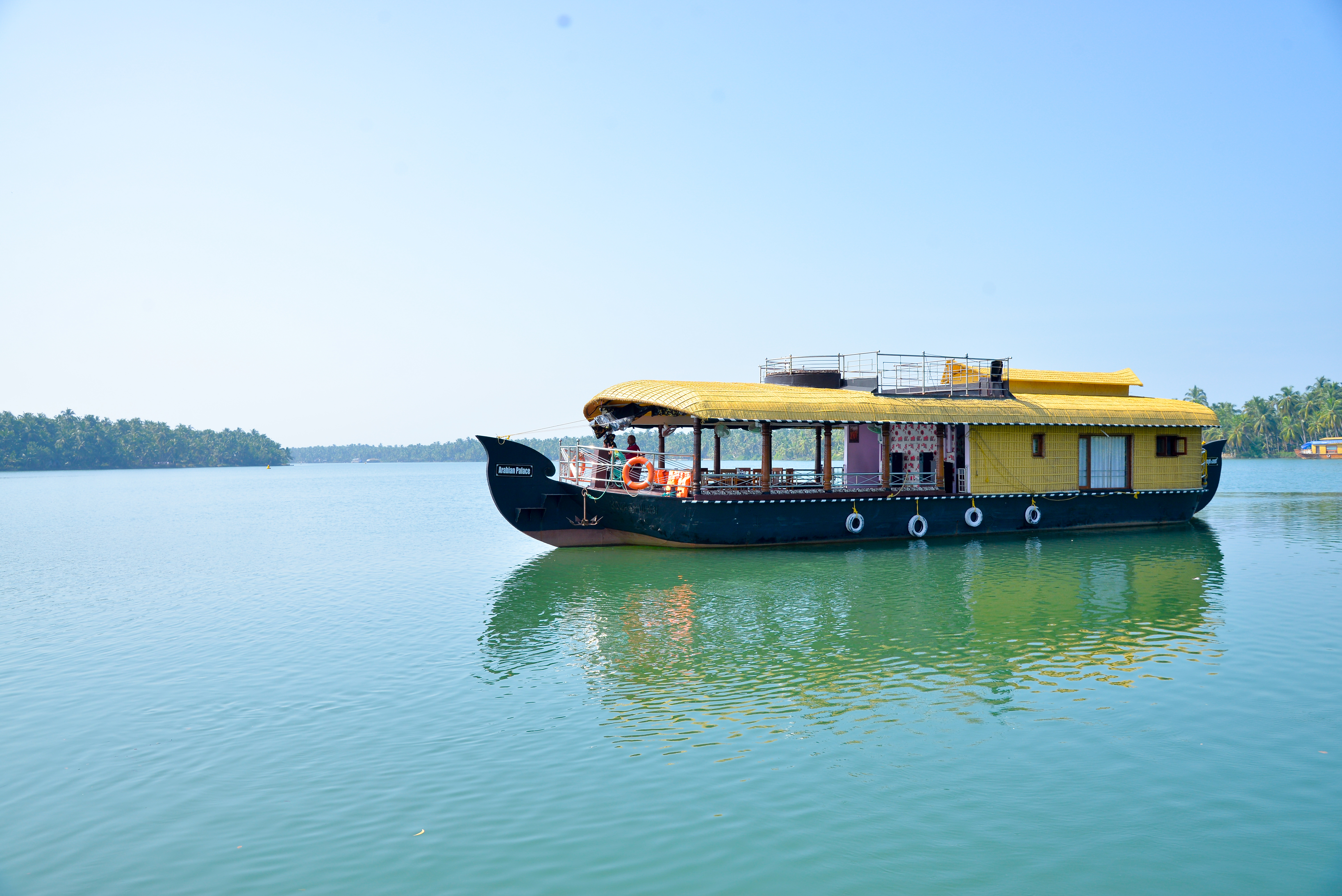
Kavvayi Backwaters of Nileshwaram

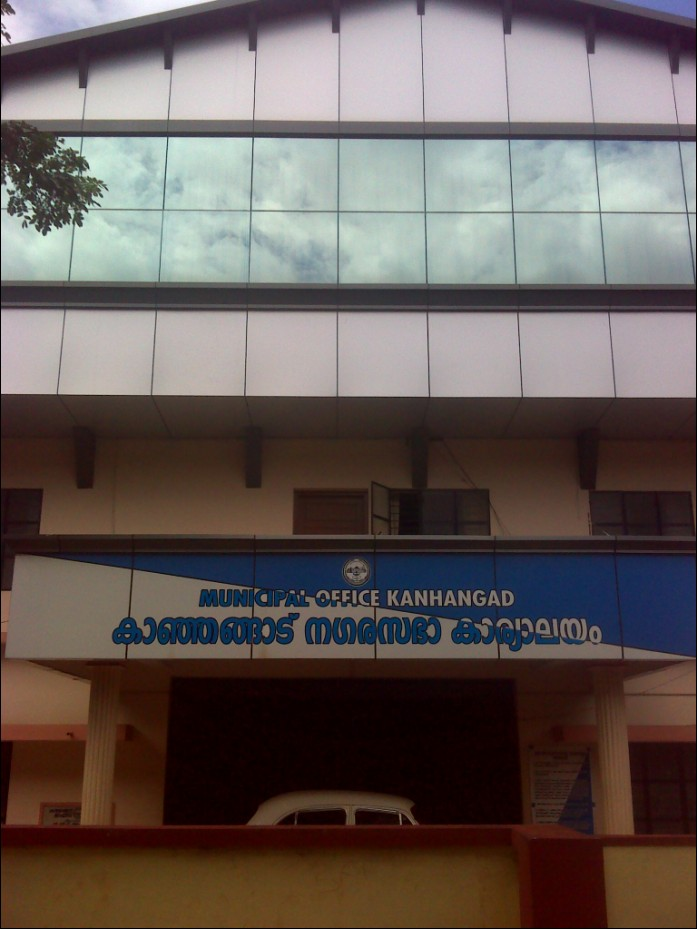
Kanhangad Municipal Office

Before the formation of Kerala, Kasargod was a part of South Canara district of erstwhile Madras Presidency. However, in 19th century CE, Kasargod Taluk witnessed many struggles to separate the region from South Canara and to merge it with the Malabar District as it was the only Malayalam-majority region in South Canara. Kasargod became a part of Kannur district of Kerala following the reorganization of states and the formation of Kerala on 1 November 1956. Later Kasargod was divided into two Taluks for the ease of administration - Kasargod and Hosdurg. Kasargod was declared a district in the year 1984. The inclusion of Kasaragod with Kerala has been a contentious issue as there is a sizeable population that speaks Tulu and Kannada. At the time of the 1951 Census of India, only 72.0% of the district's population chose their mother tongue as Malayalam. 14.2% chose Tulu and 6.3% chose Kannada. But it is noted that as per the 2011 census report only 8.8% and 4.2% of the total population in the district speak Tulu and Kannada respectively as their mother tongue. In 2012, the Second Oommen Chandy ministry appointed a commission under the leadership the former Chief Secretary P. Prabhakaran to study about the backwardness and issues faced by this northernmost district of Kerala and to draw up special package for the district. In 2013, two more taluks, Manjeshwaram and Vellarikundu, were formed in the district.
