= Vellikulangara =

Coordinates: 10°22′N 76°25′E

- village
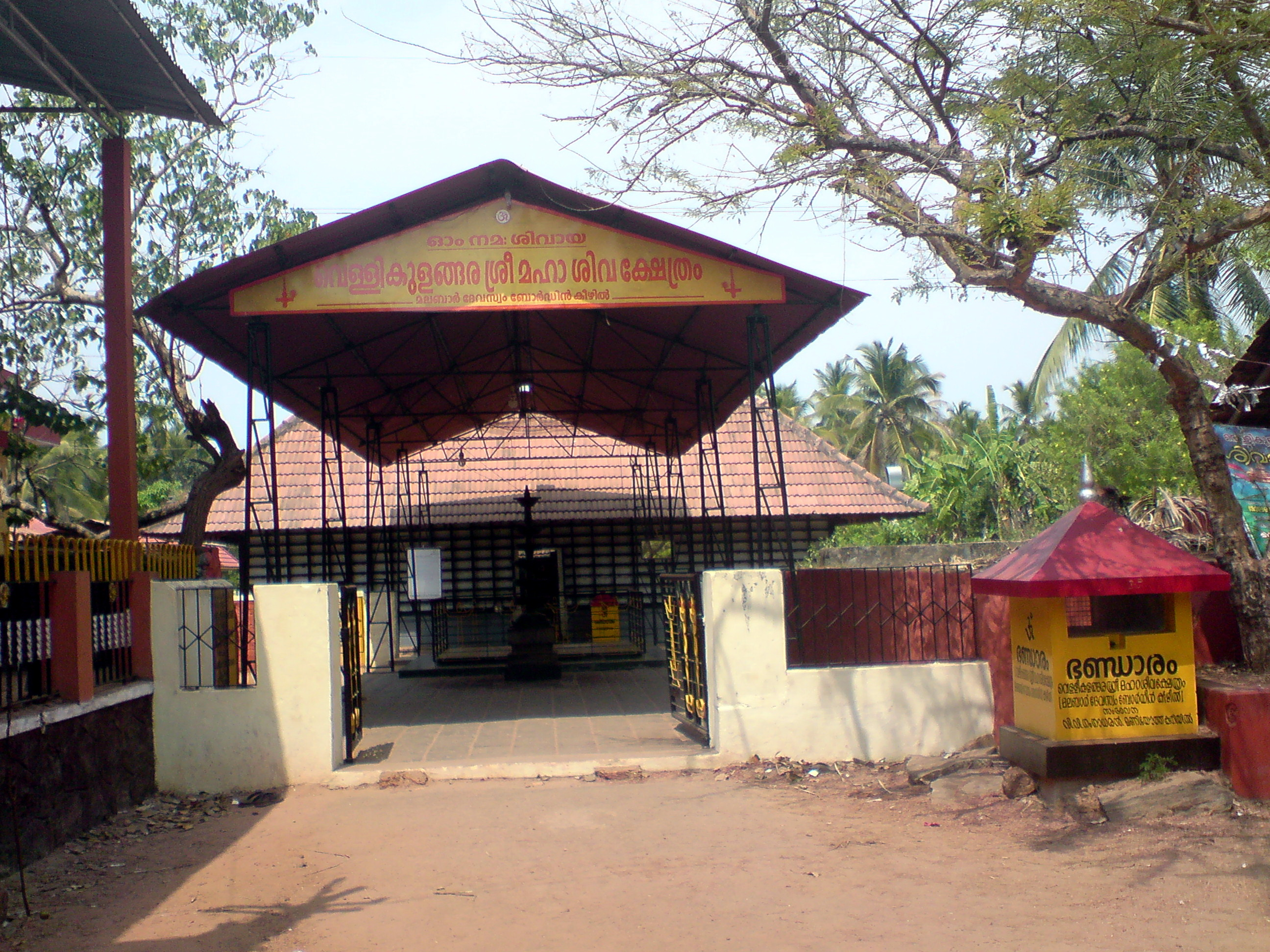
- Shiva Temple, Vellikkulangara
- Interactive map of Vellikulangara
- Country: India
- State: Kerala
- District: Thrissur

Population (2011)
  - Total: 16,854

Languages
  - Official: Malayalam
- Time zone: UTC+5:30 (IST)
- PIN: 680699
- Vehicle registration: KL-64

Vellikulangara is a village in Thrissur district in the state of Kerala, India.

== Demographics ==
As of 2011 India census, Vellikulangara had a population of 16854 with 8275 males and 8579 females.

Vellikulangara is situated near Kodaly which is 12.6 km from Kodakara and 13 km from Chalakudy. There are two ways to reach Vellikulangara: one through Chalakudy and one directly from Kodakara.

Vellikulangara is famous for the Harrison Malayalam estates at Chokana and the Anapantham Forest. Cochin State Forest Tramway used to pass through Vellikulangara, which the British used to transport quality teak logs from Parambikulam forest to the port of Cochin and on to England.

== Vellikulangara Bus Stand ==
Vellikulangara Bus Stand is a small but vital hub in the village of Vellikulangara, positioned along the Chalakudy–Kodakara road, it sits just south of landmarks like Holy Angel Hospital, Vellikulangara Kapela, and Annapoorneswari Temple. The stand is crucial for daily commuting: students, hospital visitors, and villagers rely on it heavily.

=== Routes & Connectivity ===
- Served by both KSRTC and private buses traveling to key towns: Thrissur, Irinjalakuda and Chalakudy. Also have buses to Randukai Village.
  - Frequent connections to Chalakkudy, Kodakara, and Angamaly, including limited-stop services
  - Daily service to Thrissur, with buses departing early morning through evening .
- Distance to Kodakara Junction is approximately 13 km (about a 17-minute drive)
