= Indian states ranking by media exposure =

This is a list of the Indian states and territories ranked in order of percentage of people exposed to the media. This information was compiled from NFHS-4. National Family Health Survey (NFHS) is a large-scale, multi round survey conducted by the International Institute of Population Sciences (IIPS), Mumbai designated by the Ministry of Health and Family Welfare (MOHFW), Government of India. The National Family Health Survey (NFHS-4) was based on year 2015-16 and the detailed survey can be viewed in the following website.

== List ==
State	Media Exposure (males%)	Male Rank	Media Exposure (Female %)	Females Rank
Kerala	99	1	97	1
Goa	99	1	96	2
Andhra Pradesh	96	2	93	5
Mizoram	96	2	92	6
Telangana	96	2	91	7
Himachal Pradesh	96	2	90	8
Tamil Nadu	95	3	95	3
Karnataka	95	3	91	7
Punjab	94	4	95	3
Uttarakhand	93	5	85	10
Maharashtra	92	6	85	10
Manipur	91	7	83	12
Sikkim	90	8	94	4
Jammu and Kashmir	90	8	79	15
West Bengal	88	9	78	16
Gujarat	87	10	82	13
Tripura	86	11	84	11
India	86	11	75	18
Assam	76	17	58	23
Uttar Pradesh	73	19	56	24
Nagaland	74	18	66	22
Odisha	81	14	75	18
Rajasthan	79	16	68	21
Arunachal Pradesh	80	15	70	19
Bihar	68	20	40	26
Chhattisgarh	85	12	80	14
Madhya Pradesh	79	16	69	20
Meghalaya	82	13	76	17
Jharkhand	65	21	49	25
