= Centurion Bank of Punjab =

Bank in India

Centurion bank of Punjab
- Type: Public; BSE:532273 NSE:CENTBOP, Luxembourg Stock Exchange
- Industry: Banking; Insurance; Capital Markets and allied industries
- Founded: Panaji, 1994 (as Centurion bank)
- Headquarters: Corporate Centre, 1201, Raheja Centre, Free Press Journal Marg, Nariman Point, Mumbai 400 021 India
- Key people: Chairman: Mr. Rana Talwar,
- Products: Loans, Credit Cards, Savings, Investment vehicles, Life and General Insurance (Insurance) etc.
- Website: www.centurionbop.co.in

The Centurion Bank of Punjab (formerly Centurion Bank and Bank of Punjab) was an Indian private sector bank that offered retail and corporate banking services. It had 403 branches across India and employed over 5,000 people. The bank was publicly listed on major Indian stock exchanges and the Luxembourg Stock Exchange. On 23 May 2008, it was acquired by HDFC Bank.

== History ==
Centurion Bank was incorporated on 30 June 1994 and received its certificate of Commencement of Business on 20 July. Centurion Bank was a joint venture between 20th Century Finance Corporation and its associates, and Keppel Group of Singapore through Kephinance Investment (Mauritius). Centurion had a network of ten branches, which grew to 29 branches the next year. Also in 1995 Centurion Bank amalgamated 20th Century Finance Corporation.

On 29 June 2005, the boards of directors of Centurion Bank and Bank of Punjab agreed to a merger of the two banks. The combined bank took as its name Centurion Bank of Punjab. Bank of Punjab also had been founded in 1994. In 2007, Centurion Bank of Punjab acquired Thrissur-based Lord Krishna Bank, and soon it was acquired by HDFC Bank, which was also incidentally begun in 1994.
