= Kerala Grameena Bank =

Indian regional rural Bank

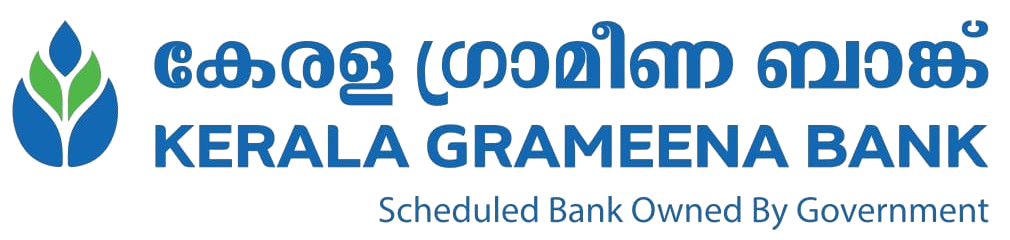
- Native name: കേരള ഗ്രാമീണ ബാങ്ക്
- Formerly: Kerala Gramin Bank (2013–2025)
- Type: Regional rural bank
- Industry: Banking; Financial services
- Predecessor: South Malabar Gramin Bank; North Malabar Gramin Bank
- Founded: 8 July 2013; 13 years ago
- Headquarters: Malappuram, Kerala, India
- Number of locations: 635 branches (2026)
- Area served: Kerala, India
- Key people: Vimala Vijaya Bhaskar (Chairperson )
- Products: Consumer banking; Corporate banking; Finance and insurance; Mortgage loans; Private banking; Savings; Asset management; Wealth management
- Owner: Government of India (50%) Government of Kerala (15%) Canara Bank (35%)
- Parent: Ministry of Finance, Government of India
- Website: kgb.bank.in

Kerala Grameena Bank (KGB) is an Indian regional rural bank (RRB), headquartered in Malappuram, Kerala. As an RRB, the Government of India holds the majority 50% shares, while the Government of Kerala holds 15% and Canara Bank owns the remaining 35% stake.

On 23 October 2025, the Ministry of Finance, Government of India, renamed the bank from Kerala Gramin Bank to Kerala Grameena Bank through Government of India Notification No. S.O. 4836(E) as part of the common branding initiative for Regional Rural Banks. As of 31 March 2026, the bank serves over 8.5 million customers through a network of 635 branches, 12 Regional Offices, 475 Business Correspondents, and 269 ATMs across Kerala.

== History ==
The bank was formed by amalgamating North Malabar Gramin Bank and South Malabar Gramin Bank on 8 July 2013 by the Ministry of Finance, Government of India. The bank serves the area previously operated by the two banks. It is sponsored by Canara Bank.

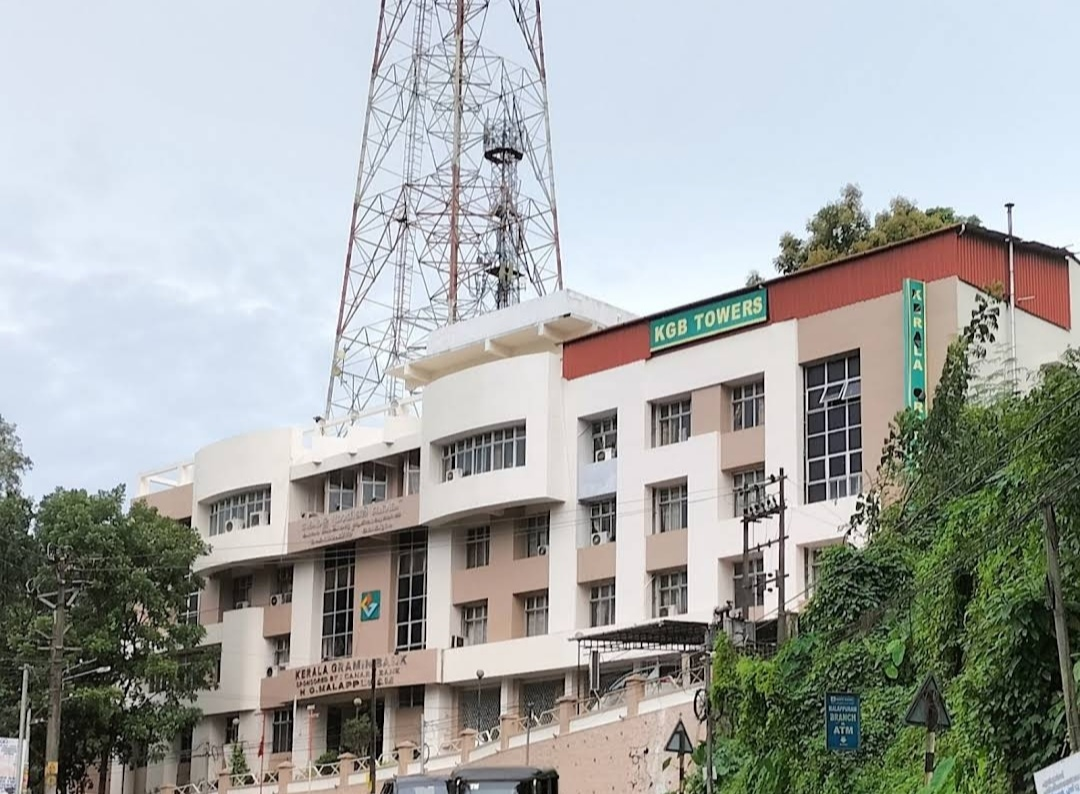
Kerala Grameena Bank Headquarters at Malappuram

On October 23, 2025, Ministry of Finance, Government of India renamed Kerala Gramin Bank as Kerala Grameena Bank through Government of India Notification No. S.O. 4836(E) as part of the Government of India's common branding initiative for Regional Rural Banks.

The origins of Kerala Grameena Bank date back to 1976, when North Malabar Gramin Bank and South Malabar Gramin Bank were established under the Regional Rural Banks Act, 1976. North Malabar Gramin Bank was established on 2 October 1976, while South Malabar Gramin Bank commenced operations on 5 October 1976. The two banks initially operated through a limited branch network and gradually expanded their operations across their respective regions of Kerala over the following decades. They were amalgamated on 8 July 2013 to form Kerala Gramin Bank.

== Operations ==
As of 31 March 2026, Kerala Grameena Bank operates 635 branches, 12 Regional Offices, 475 Business Correspondents and 269 ATMs across all 14 districts of Kerala. The bank serves more than 8.5 million customers and provides banking services through its branch network and digital delivery channels. As of 31 March 2026, the bank employed 3,965 personnel, of whom approximately 52.7% were women.

== Performance ==
In the financial year 2025-26, Kerala Grameena Bank reported a total business of ₹65,834.78 crore, comprising deposits of ₹32,488.95 crore and advances of ₹33,345.83 crore. The bank recorded a net profit of ₹776.22 crore during the financial year. As of 31 March 2026, the bank reported a Gross Non-Performing Asset (GNPA) ratio of 1.43%, a Net Non-Performing Asset (NNPA) ratio of 0%, and a Capital to Risk-Weighted Assets Ratio (CRAR) of 14.34%.

== Digital Banking ==
Kerala Grameena Bank uses the Finacle 10 core banking platform and provides digital banking services including Internet Banking, Mobile Banking, Unified Payments Interface (UPI), Immediate Payment Service (IMPS), National Electronic Funds Transfer (NEFT), Real Time Gross Settlement (RTGS), and Aadhaar Enabled Payment System (AEPS).

== Financial Inclusion ==
Kerala Grameena Bank participates in financial inclusion initiatives including the Pradhan Mantri Jan Dhan Yojana (PMJDY), Pradhan Mantri Jeevan Jyoti Bima Yojana (PMJJBY), Pradhan Mantri Suraksha Bima Yojana (PMSBY), Atal Pension Yojana (APY), Direct Benefit Transfer (DBT), and Financial Literacy Centre (FLC) programmes.

== Awards and Recognitions ==
Kerala Grameena Bank has received awards and recognitions from organizations including the Indian Banks' Association (IBA), ASSOCHAM, Infosys Finacle, IBEX India, and TransUnion CIBIL. Between 2023 and 2026, the bank received awards related to banking technology, digital banking, customer service, and financial inclusion. In 2024, the bank was included in the Forbes World's Best Banks list. At the IBA Banking Technology Awards, the bank received awards including Best Technology Bank, Best AI & ML Adoption, Best Digital Sales, Payments and Engagement, Best Digital Financial Inclusion, and Best Technology Talent & Organisation. The bank also received awards at the Infosys Finacle Innovation Awards for its eKGB digital banking platform and the IBEX India BFSI Technology Award for Most Innovative Use of Technology. In 2025, the bank received the TransUnion CIBIL Gold Award in the Best Quality Award - RRB Consumer Segment category.

== See also ==
- Banking in India
- List of banks in India
- Reserve Bank of India
- Indian Financial System Code
- Kerala Bank
