= List of states and union territories of India by households having electricity =

This is a list of the states and union territories of India ranked in order of percentage of households having electricity as the source of lighting. This information is based on 2011 and 2001 data as published by 2011 census of India and 2015-16 National Family Health Survey (NFHS). In default display, the rankings of 2016 are based on 2015-16 NFHS data. Latest data (April 2019) is based on the Saubhagya scheme portal hosted by Power Ministry.

Between 2010 and 2016, India provided electricity to 30 million people each year, more than any other country, the World Bank said in its latest report released in March 2018. While the percentage of electrified households under Saubhagya is somewhat disputed, it has been acknowledged by various non-governmental organisations that a very huge number (around 30 million) of households were electrified under the scheme.

In 2006, Gujarat became the first state to fully electrify all its villages, followed by Andhra Pradesh in 2016 and Kerala in 2017. Kerala in 2017 became the first state to fully electrify all its households. By 2018, eight other states had achieved 100 per cent saturation in household electrification under Saubhagya: Madhya Pradesh, Tripura, Bihar, Jammu and Kashmir, Mizoram, Sikkim, Telangana and West Bengal. By 2019, 15 states had achieved 100 per cent household electrification.

Note: The Saubhagya percentages does not count the households who have 'willingly not taken connections' as not electrified. In an interview to the Rajya Sabha TV R.K Singh, the power minister had said that the parts of Chhattisgarh left out are the ones that fall in the Bastar region where the Naxals hold the sway.

== List ==
State or union territory	Households having electricity (%) April 2019 (as reported by states)	Households having electricity (%) 2016	Households having electricity (%) (Census 2011)	Households having electricity (%) (Census 2001)
Kerala	100	100.0	99.4	97.9
Lakshadweep	100	99.9	99.7	99.7
Delhi	100	99.8	99.1	92.9
Goa	100	99.8	96.9	93.6
Puducherry	100	99.6	97.7	87.8
Chandigarh	100	99.6	98.4	96.8
Punjab	100	99.6	96.6	91.9
Himachal Pradesh	100	99.5	96.8	94.8
Sikkim	100	99.4	93.2	92.8
Daman and Diu	100	99.1	97	95.2
Andhra Pradesh	100	98.8	92.2	67.2
Haryana	100	98.8	90.5	82.9
Tamil Nadu	100	98.8	93.4	78.2
Telangana	100	98.3	-	-
Karnataka	100	97.8	90.6	78.5
Uttarakhand	100	97.5	87.0	60.3
Dadra and Nagar Haveli	100	97.4	95.2	86.0
Jammu and Kashmir	100	97.4	85.1	80.6
Andaman and Nicobar Islands	100	97	86.1	76.8
Nagaland	100	97	81.6	63.6
Gujarat	100	96.0	90.4	80.4
Mizoram	100	95.9	84.2	69.6
Chhattisgarh	100	95.6	75.3	53.1
West Bengal	100	93.7	54.5	37.5
Tripura	100	92.7	68.4	41.8
Maharashtra	100	92.5	83.9	77.5
Manipur	100	92.4	68.3	60.0
Meghalaya	100	91.4	60.9	42.7
Rajasthan	100	91	67.0	54.7
Madhya Pradesh	100	89.9	67.1	70.0
Arunachal Pradesh	100	88.7	65.7	54.7
India	100	88.2	67.2	55.8
Odisha	100	85.5	43.0	26.9
Jharkhand	100	80.1	45.8	24.3
Assam	100	78.2	37.0	24.9
Uttar Pradesh	100	70.9	36.8	31.9
Bihar	100	58.60	37.50	20.70

== See also ==
- Electricity sector in India
- Energy policy of India
