= George Eden (disambiguation) =

George Eden, 1st Earl of Auckland (1784–1849) was a British politician.

George Eden may also refer to:

- George Morton Eden (1806–1862), British Army officer
- George Rodney Eden (1853–1918), British Anglican bishop; Bishop of Dover and of Wakefield
- George Eden (died 1559), MP for Knaresborough
- George Eden (India) (–2003), former Ernakulam MP, father of Hibi Eden
