= Kerala Bank =

Indian bank based in Kerala

- Company type: Cooperative bank
- Industry: Banking; Financial services
- Founded: 1915; 111 years ago Travancore
- Headquarters: Thiruvananthapuram, India
- Parent: Government of Kerala
- Website: kerala.bank.in

Kerala State Co-operative Bank Limited, branded as Kerala Bank, is an Indian co-operative bank set up by the Government of Kerala, India.

== History ==
Among the 14 District Co-operative Banks functioning in Kerala at the time of the formation of Kerala State Co-operative Bank, only the Malappuram District Co-operative Bank Ltd had opposed merger with the Kerala State Co-operative Bank. Also, the High Court of Kerala has issued a stay order on the Kerala State Government's move to merge the Malappuram District Co-operative Bank with the Kerala State Co-operative Bank. In addition to the 14 district co-operative banks, Kerala has a network of 1,692 Primary Agricultural Credit Societies (PACS's) and 16 licensed Urban Co-operative Banks all of which have become members/shareholders of the current bank.

== Structure ==
The headquarters of the Kerala Bank is in Thiruvananthapuram and the corporate office is based in Kochi. The Bank has seven regional offices created by merging two District Co-operative Banks to handle businesses of two districts each. The regional offices are in Thiruvananthapuram (along with Kollam), Alappuzha (along with Pathanamthitta), Kottayam (along with Idukki), Thrissur (along with Ernakulam), Palakkad (along with Malappuram), Kozhikode (along with Wayanad) and Kannur (along with Kasaragod).

== Controversy ==
In September 2022, a college student from Sooranad committed suicide after the Kerala Bank pasted attachment notice indicating defaulting on loan repayment in front of her house.
