= Banking in Bangladesh =

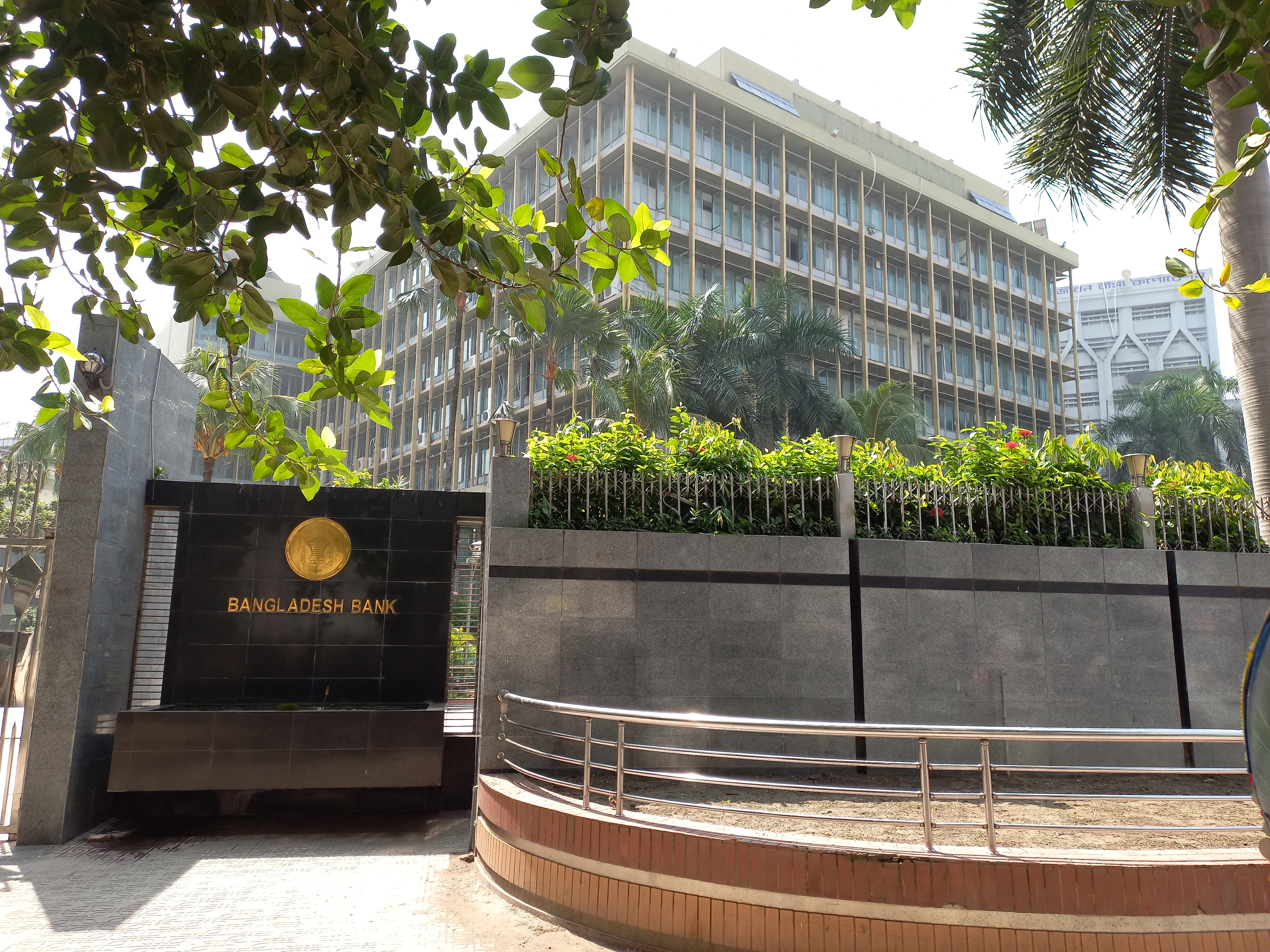
Bangladesh Bank in Motijheel, Dhaka

Bangladesh, classified as a developing country, faces challenges in its banking sector, particularly concerning the services and customer care provided by state-owned banks.

While private banks have made efforts to adopt banking practices similar to those in more developed countries, these initiatives are often hindered by policies implemented by Bangladesh Bank, the country's central bank. These policies, at times, are seen as politically influenced or ineffective, contributing to a banking environment where corruption, money laundering, and illegal financial activities can occur.

== History ==
=== Before independence ===
The first modern bank in Bengal was the Bank of Hindustan, established in 1770 in Calcutta. It was an offshoot of trading company Messrs. Alexander and Co. and operated until 1832, when the trading company failed. The circulation of its notes was limited to Calcutta and its immediate environs.

A number of Calcutta-based banks followed, none of which survived beyond the middle of the 19th century: General Bank of Bengal and Bihar (1733–75); Bengal Bank (1784–91) (no relation to the later Bank of Bengal); General Bank, later General Bank of India (1786–91); The Commercial Bank; The Calcutta Bank; The Union Bank; The Government Savings Bank; and The Bank of Mirzapore.

The Bank of Calcutta, established in 1806, is the oldest still in existence in some form. It was renamed Bank of Bengal in 1809, was merged into the Imperial Bank of India in 1921, and became the State Bank of India in 1955.

The first modern bank headquartered in Dhaka was The Dacca Bank, established in 1846. It did very limited business and did not issue banknotes. It was purchased by the Bank of Bengal in 1862. Bank of Bengal opened branches in Sirajganj and Chittagong in 1873, and in Chandpur in 1900. In 1947, upon the Partition of Bengal, it had six branches in East Bengal, in Dhaka, Chittagong, Chandpur, Mymensingh, Rangpur, and Narayanganj.

Following the partition, branches of the registered banks started shifting to India or closing down their operations in East Bengal. As a result, only 69 branches were left in East Pakistan in 1951.

In 1959, Eastern Mercantile Bank Limited was established and had 106 before independence. Consequently, in 1965, Eastern Banking Corporation was established and soon reached 60 just before the liberation war. These two banks were established with the initiation of some renowned Bengali businessmen for providing credit to the local entrepreneurs who had limited access to credit in those days from other financial institutions of West Pakistan.

=== After independence ===
The banking system at independence (1971) consisted of two branch offices of the former State Bank of Pakistan and seventeen large commercial banks, two of which were controlled by Bangladeshi interests and three by foreigners other than West Pakistanis. There were fourteen smaller commercial banks.

Virtually all banking services were concentrated in urban areas. The newly independent government immediately designated the Dhaka branch of the State Bank of Pakistan as the central bank and renamed it the Bangladesh Bank. The bank was responsible for regulating currency, controlling credit and monetary policy, and administering exchange control and the official foreign exchange reserves. The Bangladesh government initially nationalised the entire domestic banking system and proceeded to reorganise and rename the various banks. Foreign-owned banks were permitted to continue doing business in Bangladesh. The insurance business was also nationalised and became a source of potential investment funds. Cooperative credit systems and postal savings offices handled service to small individual and rural accounts. The new banking system succeeded in establishing reasonably efficient procedures for managing credit and foreign exchange. The primary function of the credit system throughout the 1970s was to finance trade and the public sector, which together absorbed 75 per cent of total advances.

After the liberation of Bangladesh, the twelve banking companies that were doing business in Bangladesh were nationalized by the government of the People's Republic of Bangladesh.

Nationalized Bank	Before Independence		
Sonali Bank	National Bank of Pakistan	Bank of Bhawalpur	Premier Bank Limited
Rupali Bank	Muslim Commercial Bank	Australasia Bank Limited	Standard Bank Limited
Agrani Bank	Commerce Bank Limited	Habib Bank Limited	
Janata Bank	United Bank Limited	Union Bank Limited	
Pubali Bank	Eastern Mercantile Bank Limited		
Uttara Bank	Eastern Banking Corporation		

The government's encouragement during the late 1970s and early 1980s of agricultural development and private industry brought changes in lending strategies. Managed by the Bangladesh Krishi Bank, a specialised agricultural banking institution, lending to farmers and fishermen dramatically expanded. The number of rural bank branches doubled between 1977 and 1985, to more than 3,330. Denationalisation and private industrial growth led the Bangladesh Bank and the World Bank to focus their lending on the emerging private manufacturing sector. Scheduled bank advances to private agriculture, as a percentage of sectoral GDP, rose from 2 per cent in FY 1979 to 11 per cent in FY 1987, while advances to private manufacturing rose from 13 to 53 per cent.

The transformation of finance priorities brought with it problems in administration. No sound project-appraisal system was in place to identify viable borrowers and projects. Lending institutions did not have adequate autonomy to choose borrowers and projects and were often instructed by the political authorities. In addition, the incentive system for the banks stressed disbursements rather than recoveries, and the accounting and debt collection systems were inadequate to deal with the problems of loan recovery. It became more common for borrowers to default on loans than to repay them; the lending system was simply disbursing grant assistance to private individuals who qualified for loans more for political than for economic reasons. The rate of recovery on agricultural loans was only 27 per cent in FY 1986, and the rate on industrial loans was even worse. As a result of this poor showing, major donors applied pressure to induce the government and banks to take firmer action to strengthen internal bank management and credit discipline. As a consequence, recovery rates began to improve in 1987. The National Commission on Money, Credit, and Banking recommended broad structural changes in Bangladesh's system of financial intermediation early in 1987, many of which were built into a three-year compensatory financing facility signed by Bangladesh with the IMF in February 1987.

One major exception to the management problems of Bangladeshi banks was the Grameen Bank, begun as a government project in 1976 and established in 1983 as an independent bank. In the late 1980s, the bank continued to provide financial resources to the poor on reasonable terms and to generate productive self-employment without external assistance. Its customers were landless persons who took small loans for all types of economic activities, including housing. About 70 per cent of the borrowers were women, who were otherwise not much represented in institutional finance. Collective rural enterprises also could borrow from the Grameen Bank for investments in tube wells, rice and oil mills, and power looms and for leasing land for joint cultivation. The average loan by the Grameen Bank in the mid-1980s was around Tk 2,000 (US$25), and the maximum was just Tk 18,000 (for construction of a tin-roof house). Repayment terms were 4 per cent for rural housing and 8.5 per cent for normal lending operations.

The Grameen Bank extended collateral-free loans to 200,000 landless people in its first 10 years. Most of its customers had never dealt with formal lending institutions before. The most remarkable accomplishment was the phenomenal recovery rate; amid the prevailing pattern of bad debts throughout the Bangladeshi banking system, only 4 per cent of Grameen Bank loans were overdue. The bank had, from the outset, applied a specialised system of intensive credit supervision that set it apart from others. Its success, though still on a rather small scale, provided hope that it could continue to grow and that it could be replicated or adapted to other development-related priorities. The Grameen Bank was expanding rapidly, planning to have 500 branches throughout the country by the late 1980s.

Beginning in late 1985, the government pursued a tight monetary policy aimed at limiting the growth of domestic private credit and government borrowing from the banking system. The policy was largely successful in reducing the growth of the money supply and total domestic credit. Net credit to the government actually declined in FY 1986. The problem of credit recovery remained a threat to monetary stability, responsible for serious resource misallocation and harsh inequities. Although the government had begun effective measures to improve financial discipline, the draconian contraction of credit availability contained the risk of inadvertently discouraging new economic activity.

Foreign exchange reserves at the end of FY 1986 were US$476 million, equivalent to slightly more than two months worth of imports. This represented a 20-per cent increase in reserves over the previous year, largely the result of higher remittances by Bangladeshi workers abroad. The country also reduced imports by about 10 per cent to US$2.4 billion. Because of Bangladesh's status as a least developed country receiving concessional loans, private creditors accounted for only about 6 per cent of outstanding public debt. The external public debt was US$6.4 billion, and annual debt service payments were US$467 million at the end of FY 1986.

The reform program continued in subsequent years. Bangladesh Bank administered the World Bank's Financial Institutions Development Project from 2000 to 2006, which, according to the Asian Development Bank, enabled "substantial progress towards sustainable financing of private sector initiatives to accelerate industrial growth in the country".

"Three lessons stand out from Bangladesh's development experience and can inspire other countries: empowering women and girls, investing in people and connectivity, and moving decisively on climate adaptation and resilience," said the World Bank president.

=== Post 2010s ===
Mobile financial services or MFS, such as bKash, Nagad and Rocket, have become widespread in addition to increasing levels of bank accounts per capita and debit card ownership.

=== 2020s ===
Owing to decades of defaulted loans to influential businessmen, politicians and subsequent smuggling/siphoning of wealth from the country had caused a crisis of confidence in the banks after the fall of Hasina.

== Islamic banking in Bangladesh ==
Bangladesh has eight Islamic banks, while several non-Islamic banks offer Islamic-banking services alongside their normal operations. As of 2017, Islamic banking, led by Islami Bank Bangladesh Ltd, controls 20% of deposits in Bangladesh. Bangladesh operates the world's biggest Islamic microfinance scheme. According to Bangladeshi government polling, Islamic banking has an overall approval rating of 84% among the country's population.

== Mobile banking in Bangladesh ==
Service Name	Bank/Service Provider	Inauguration Ceremony	First Operation in market place	Mobile_Partners of operation	Facilities (Charge)					
Service Name	Bank/Service Provider	Inauguration Ceremony	First Operation in market place	Mobile_Partners of operation	Cash In	Cash Out	P2P	Recharge Mobile	Shopping/ Bill Payment	
DBBL Mobile Banking (Rocket)	Dutch Bangla Bank Ltd. Bangladesh	December 2010	May 2011	Banglalink (31 March 2011), CityCell (31 March 2011), Grameen Phone (27 November 2012), Airtel (12 September 2011), Teletalk(Date: )	Yes	Yes	Yes	Yes	Yes	
bKash	Brac Bank Ltd. Bangladesh		July 2011	Grameen Phone (18 January 2012), Banglalink (July 2011), Teletalk(Date: ), Robi-Airtel(Date: )	Yes	Yes	Yes	Yes	Yes	
Cellfin	Islami Bank Bangladesh Ltd				Yes	Yes	Yes	Yes	Yes	
Upay	United Commercial Bank Ltd. Bangladesh		November 2013	Grameen Phone (20 June 2014), Banglalink (March 2014), RobiAirtel(Date: ), Teletalk(Date: )	Yes	Yes	Yes	Yes	Yes	
My Cash	Mercantile Bank Ltd. Bangladesh		February 2012	Grameen Phone (1 December 2013), RobiAirtel(Date: ) Banglalink (28 October 2013)	Yes	Yes	Yes	Yes	Yes	
OK Mobile Banking	One Bank Ltd. Bangladesh		October 2013	Grameen Phone (5 October 2013), Robi-Airtel(Date: ), Teletalk(Date: ), Banglalink(Date: )	Yes	Yes	Yes	Yes	Yes	
Nagad	Bangladesh Post Office, Ministry of Post and Telecommunication.		Teletalk(Date: ), RobiAirtel (Date: ), Banglalink (Date: ), Grameen Phone (Date:)		Yes	Yes	Yes	Yes	Yes	
Trust Axiata Pay	Trust Bank Ltd & Axiata Digital. Bangladesh		1 April 2018		Yes	Yes	Yes	Yes	Yes	
Rupali Bank Sure Cash	Rupali Bank		December 2014	Teletalk(Date: ), RobiAirtel (Date: ), Banglalink (Date: ), Grameen Phone (Date:)		Yes	Yes	Yes	Yes	Yes

== Offshore banking in Bangladesh ==
=== History ===
Offshore Banking Operation (OBO) was first introduced by Bangladesh Bank in 1985 through a circular allowing active foreign financing at Export Processing Zones (EPZs). Banks operated the services with Bangladesh Bank approval without any separate law for an offshore banking system until the enactment of the Offshore Banking Act, 2024. The enactment of a separate law allowed banks to promote fixed deposit products, where banks used to primarily use offshore banking operations by taking foreign loans and lending to local entities.

=== Offshore Banking Act, 2024 ===
- The law allows the offshore banking operations to be executed with US dollar, pound, euro, yen, and the yuan.
- No income tax or charges can be imposed on the interest or profit earned by the Offshore Banking Units, and no fees or levies can be imposed on the accounts of depositors or foreign lenders.
- The OBUs can take deposits from fully foreign-owned companies in Export Processing Zones (EPZs), Economic Zones, and Hi-tech parks.
- The OBUs can provide short-term loans, open letters of credit, provide guarantees, bill discounting, bill negotiating, and other outsourcing services related to international trade. In the case of resident Bangladeshis, OBUs can provide deferred export bill discounting on imports and exports. Upon approval from Bangladesh Bank, OBUs can provide medium- and long-term loans to local industrial enterprises.
- Offshore accounts can be opened on behalf of their relatives or friends residing abroad.

== Bill pay services provided by mobile phone operators ==
Service Name	Mobile operator/ Service Provider	Inauguration Ceremony	First Operation in market place	Service Charge	Services				
Service Name	Mobile operator/ Service Provider	Inauguration Ceremony	First Operation in market place	Service Charge	Regular Mobile Recharge	Electricity	Gas	Water	Others
Teletalk Bill Payment System - TBPS	(Teletalk)				No	Yes; REB Bill	No	No	
RobiCash	(Robi-Airtel)				Yes	Yes; Greater Comilla	Yes	Yes	
GPAY (formerly MobiCash (BillPay))	(Grameenphone)	19 December 2006 ('BillPay', PDB, Chittagong); 4 March 2010 ('Mobitaka', Ticket, Bangladesh Railway)	19 December 2006 ('BillPay', PDB, Chittagong); 4 March 2010 ('Mobitaka', Ticket, Bangladesh Railway)		Yes	Yes	Yes	Yes	
CityCell Moneybag (currently closed)	(CityCell)				Yes; Via SMS(AB Bank), Via USSD(DBBL)	Yes; DESCO (by SMS, Moneybag)	No	Yes; Dhaka Wasa (by SMS, Moneybag)	Foreign Remittance (Ref. AB Bank)
Mobile Cash (currently closed)	(Banglalink Digital Communications Ltd.)	18 January 2011	18 January 2011		Yes	Yes	Yes	Yes	

== See also ==
- List of banks in Bangladesh
- Bangladesh Security Printing Corporation
