= History of the rupee =

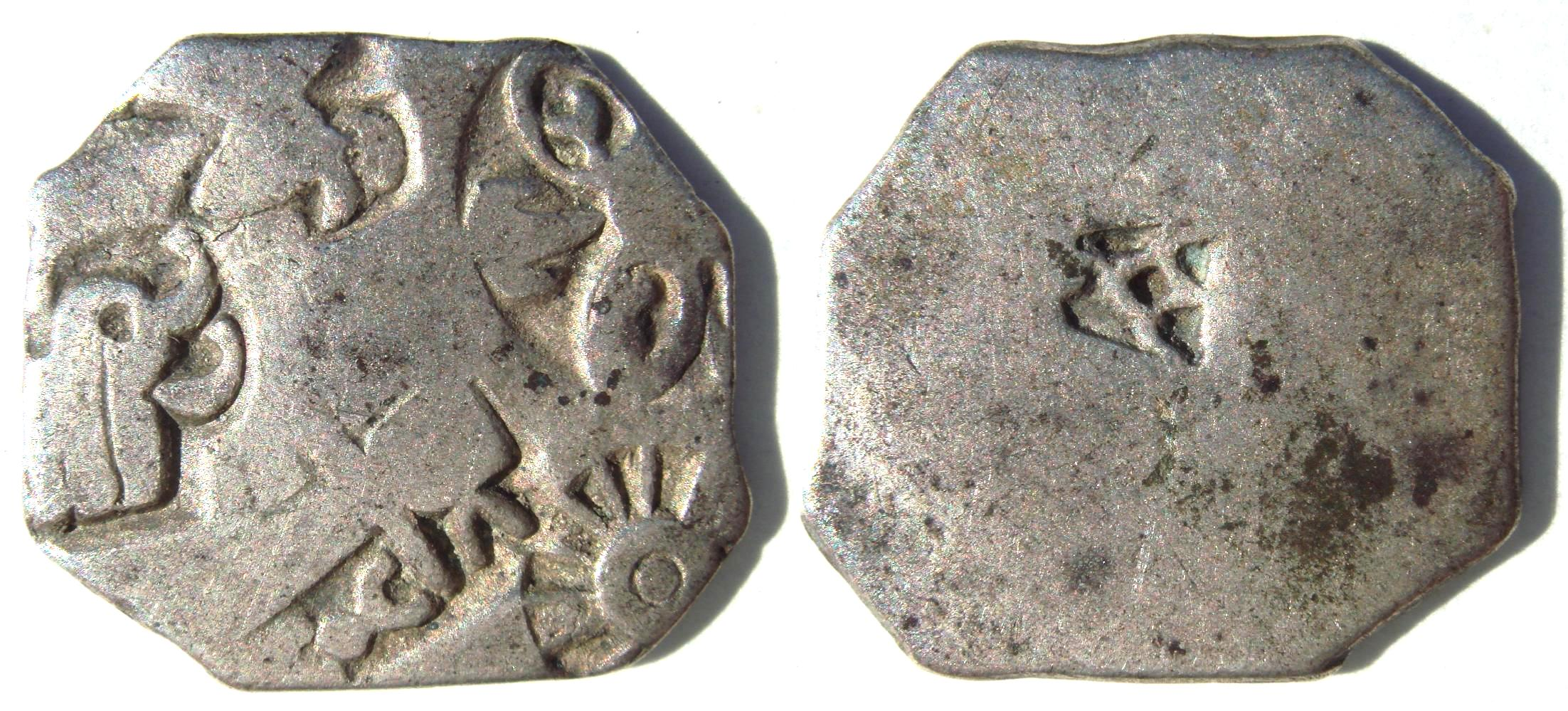
Silver coin of the Maurya Empire, known as Rūpyarūpa, with symbols of wheel and elephant. 3rd century BC.

The history of the rupee traces back to ancient times in the Indian subcontinent. The mention of rūpya by Pāṇini is seemingly the earliest reference in a text about coins. The term in Indian subcontinent was used for referring to a coin.

The word "rupee" is derived from a Sanskrit word "rūpya", which means "wrought silver", and maybe also something stamped with an image or a coin. As an adjective it means "shapely", with a more specific meaning of "stamped, impressed", whence "coin". It is derived from the noun rūpa "shape, likeness, image".

Arthashastra, written by Chanakya, prime minister to the first Maurya emperor Chandragupta Maurya (c. 340–290 BC), mentions silver coins as rūpyarūpa, other types including gold coins (suvarṇarūpa), copper coins (tāmrarūpa) and lead coins (sīsarūpa) are mentioned. Rūpa means form or shape, example, rūpyarūpa, rūpya – wrought silver, rūpa – form.

In the intermediate times there was no fixed monetary system as reported by the Great Tang Records on the Western Regions.

Sher Shah Suri, during his five-year rule from 1540 to 1545, set up a new civic and military administration and issued a coin of silver, weighing 178 grains, which was also termed Rupiya. The Mughal rulers issued coins honouring the Hindu deities in 1604–1605.

The coins depicting Ram and Sita were issued in both silver and gold; minting ended right after Akbar's death in 1605.

The silver coin remained in use during the Mughal period, Maratha era, as well as in British India. Among the earliest issues of paper rupees include the Bank of Hindostan (1770–1832), the General Bank of Bengal and Bihar (1773–75, established by Warren Hastings), and the Bengal Bank (1784–1791).

The Indian rupee was a silver-based currency during much of the 19th century, which had severe consequences on the standard value of the currency, as stronger economies were on the gold standard. During British rule, and the first decade of independence, the rupee was subdivided into 16 annas. Each anna was subdivided into 4 pices. So one rupee was equal to 64 pice (paisa) and 192 pies as 1 Pice was equal to 3 pies. In 1957, decimalisation occurred and the rupee was divided into 100 naye paise (Hindi/Urdu for new paisas). After a few years, the initial "naye" was dropped.

For many years in the early and mid-20th century, the Indian rupee was the official currency in several areas that were controlled by the British and governed from India; areas such as East Africa, Southern Arabia and the Persian Gulf.

== Early uses ==
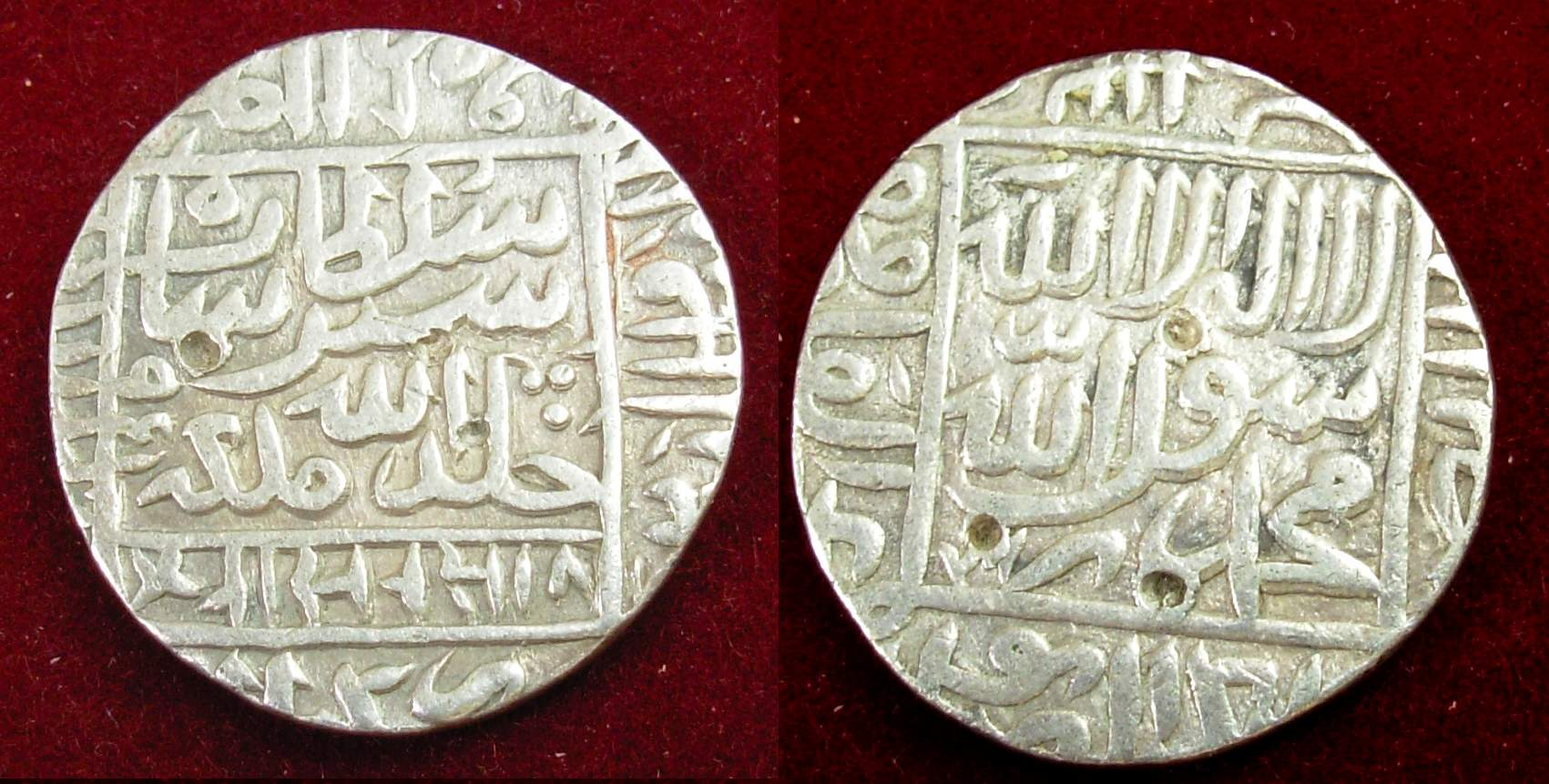
Rupiya issued by the Sher Shah Suri, 1540–1545 CE

The word "rupee" is derived from a Sanskrit word "rūpya", which means "wrought silver", and maybe also something stamped with an image or a coin. As an adjective it means "shapely", with a more specific meaning of "stamped, impressed", whence "coin". It is derived from the noun rūpa "rupa in sanskrit means silver".

Pāṇini used rūpya to mean beautiful or struck (ahāta). The second meaning applies to a coin. Kasikakara expands upon this, these coins that stamped were the Dinara, Kedara and Karshapana. The term Rupataraka is mentioned by Patanjali in reference to one who checks the Karshapana coins. An early Pali scripture uses the term Mashaka-rupa, Mashaka being a token Karshapana. The term was no longer in much use to refer to a coin in later eras. In the Rajatarangini, the term rupakas is used for gold coins, they are called svarna-rupakas. The Kathasaritsagara calls the gold Dinar coins svarna-rupakas.

Arthashastra, written by Chanakya, prime minister to the first Maurya emperor Chandragupta Maurya (c. 340–290 BC), mentions silver coins as rūpyarūpa, other types of coins including gold coins (suvarṇarūpa), copper coins (tāmrarūpa) and lead coins (sīsarūpa) are also mentioned. Rūpa means form or shape, example, rūpyarūpa, rūpya – wrought silver, rūpa – form.

In the intermediate times there is no fixed monetary system as reported by the Da Tang Xi Yu Ji.

During his five-year rule from 1540 to 1546, Sher Shah Suri set up a new civic and military administration and issued a coin of silver, weighing 178 grains, which was also termed the Rupiya. The silver coin remained in use during the Mughal period, the Maratha era (1674–1818) and in British India, as well.

== Coinage since the British period ==
1 Paisa coupon issued by Princely State of Sayla

The British settlements in Western India, South India, and the Eastern Province of Bengal (Calcutta) independently developed different coinages in consonance with the local acceptability of the coins for the purposes of trade.

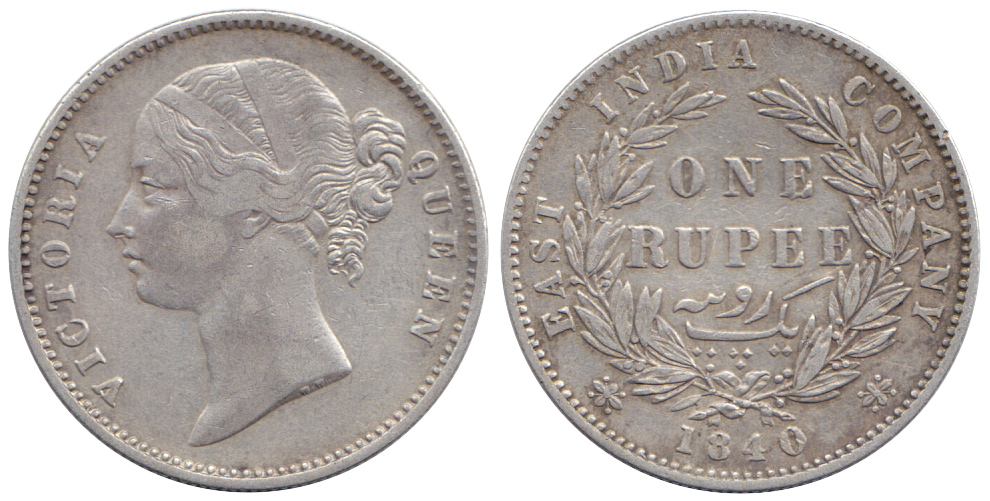
1840 East India Company rupee. It was minted in Bombay, Calcutta and Madras.

Indian rupee featuring bust of George V.
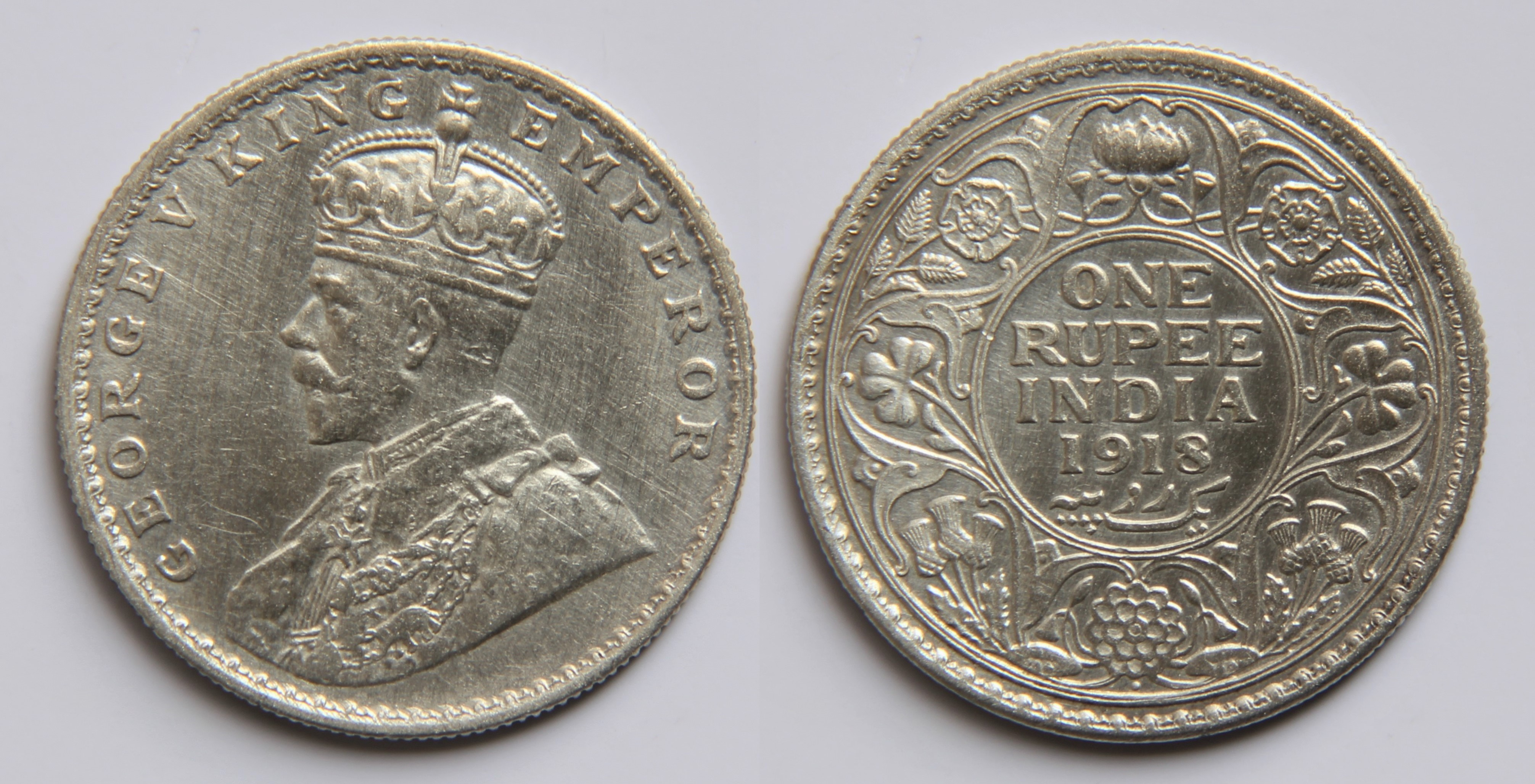
First side of the image: Obverse: Profile of George V surrounded by his name.
Second side of the image: Reverse: Face value, country and date.
Made of 91.7% silver.

There are many fake coins of East India Company, with Indian gods depicted on the obverse side as shown in side-bar. Original East India Company coins show only the coat of arms of the East India Company.

The coins of Bengal were developed in the Mughal style and those of Madras mostly in a South Indian style. The English coins of Western India developed along Mughal as well as English patterns. It was only in AD 1717 that the British obtained permission from the Emperor Farrukh Siyar to coin Mughal money at the Bombay mint. The British gold coins were termed Carolina, the silver coins Anglina, the copper coins Cupperoon and tin coins Tinny. By early 1830, the British had become the dominant power in India. The Coinage Act of 1835 provided for uniform coinage throughout India. The new coins had the effigy of William IV on the obverse and the value on the reverse in English and Persian. The coins issued after 1840 bore the portrait of Queen Victoria. The first coinage under the crown was issued in 1862 and in 1877 Queen Victoria assumed the title the Empress of India. The gold silver ratio widened during 1870–1910. Unlike India, Britain was on the gold standard. To meet the Home Charges (i.e., expenditure in England) the colonial government had to remit a larger number of rupees due to the ratio change; this necessitated increased taxation and unrest.

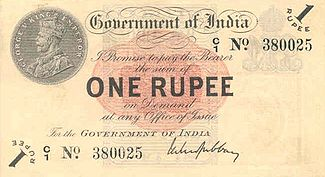
British Indian 1 rupee, 1917

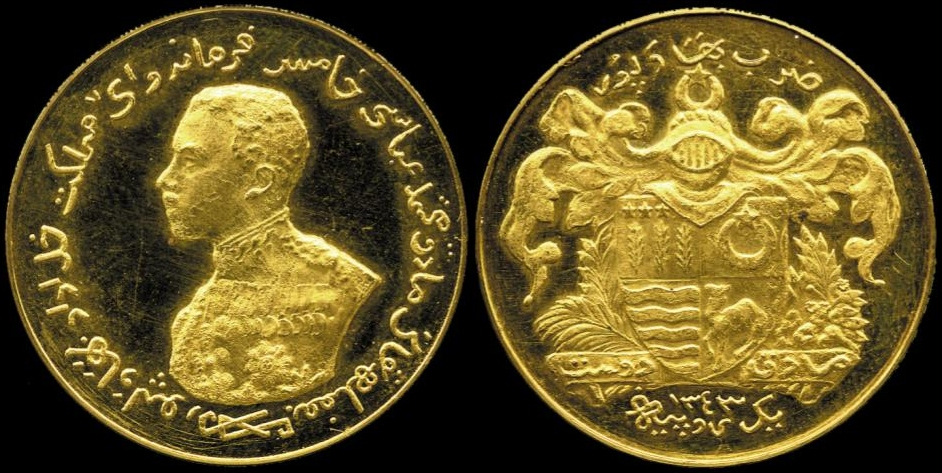
Rupee gold coin of princely state of Bahawalpur

The 1911 accession to the throne of the King-Emperor George V led to the famous "pig rupee". On the coin, the king appeared wearing the chain of the Order of the Indian Elephant. Through poor engraving, the elephant looked very much like a pig. The Muslim population was enraged and the image had to be quickly redesigned.

Acute shortage of silver during the First World War, led to the introduction of paper currency of one rupee and two and a half rupees. The silver coins of smaller denominations were issued in cupro-nickel. The Second World War led to experiments in coinage where the standard rupee was replaced by the "Quaternary Silver Alloy". The Quaternary Silver coins were issued from 1940. In 1947 these were replaced by pure Nickel coins.

Immediately after independence, the British coinage was continued. The monetary system remained unchanged at One Rupee consisting of 64 pice, or 192 pies.

The "Anna Series" was introduced on 15 August 1950. This was the first coinage of the Republic of India. The King's image was replaced by the Ashoka's Lion Capital. A corn sheaf replaced the tiger on the one rupee coin. The monetary system was retained with one rupee consisting of 16 Annas. The 1955 Indian Coinage (Amendment) Act, that came into force with effect from 1 April 1957, introduced a "Decimal series". The rupee was now divided into 100 'Paisa' instead of 16 Annas or 64 Pice. The "Naye Paise" coins were minted in the denominations of 1, 2, 5, 10, 20 and 50 Naye Paise. Both the Anna series and the Naye Paise coins were valid for some time. From 1968 onward, the new coins were called just Paise instead of Naye Paise because they were no longer 'naye' (English = new).

With high inflation in the sixties, small denomination coins which had been made from bronze, nickel-brass, cupro-nickel, and aluminium-bronze were gradually minted in aluminium. This change commenced with the introduction of the new hexagonal 3 paise coin. A twenty paise coin was introduced in 1968 but did not gain much popularity.

Over a period, cost-benefit considerations led to the gradual discontinuance of 1, 2 and 3 paise coins in the 1970s. Stainless steel coinage of 10, 25 and 50 paise was introduced in 1988 and of one rupee in 1992. The very considerable costs of managing note issues of ₹1, ₹2, and ₹5 led to the gradual replacement of notes by coins for these denominations in the 1990s.

During the World War II, Subhas Chandra Bose led Indian National Army (INA) liberated Mizoram, Manipur and parts of Nagaland from the colonial British control with the help of Japanese forces, British Indian rupee was banned and Japanese rupee (1942–44) was introduced.

== Since 1947 ==
Since its Independence in 1947, Indian rupee was adopted as currency in the nation. During this period almost till mid the 1960s Indian rupee was also a legal tender in Trucial States, Oman, Bahrain and Kuwait.

=== Decimalisation (1950s) ===
History of Indian Rupee (₹):

Dates	Currency system
1850–1957	Rupee = 16 annas = 64 pices = 192 pies
From 1 April 1957 to 31 May 1964	1₹ = 100 naye paise
From 1 June 1964 till today	1₹ = 100 paise

The price of 16 Annas was 1 rupee in 1947. The demand for decimalization existed for over a century. Sri Lanka decimalised its rupee in 1869. The Indian Coinage Act was amended in September 1955 for the adoption of a decimal system for coinage. The Act came into force with effect from 1 April 1957. The rupee remained unchanged in value and nomenclature. It, however, was now divided into 100 'Paisa' instead of 16 Annas or 96 paisa or 64 Pice. For public recognition, the new decimal Paisa was termed 'Naya Paisa' until 1 June 1964 when the term 'Naya' was dropped. The coins of that period also mentioned their value in terms of the rupee to avoid confusion and cheating. For example, the one paisa coin carried the text "एक रुपये का सौंवा भाग"(One hundredth of one rupee).

=== 1966 Economic crisis ===
Indian currency began with a devaluation in 1949 due to devaluation of Pound sterling. However, since India's trade was largely in Pound sterling it did not register much impact like the two major devaluations of the rupee: In 1966 and 1991 in the face of economic crisis.

From 1950, India ran continued trade deficits that increased in magnitude in the 1960s. Furthermore, the Government of India had a budget deficit problem and could not borrow money from abroad or from the private corporate sector, due to that sector's negative savings rate. As a result, the government issued bonds to the RBI, what increased the money supply, leading to inflation. In 1966, foreign aid, which had hitherto been a key factor in preventing devaluation of the rupee, was finally cut off and India was told it had to liberalise its restrictions on trade before foreign aid would again materialize. The response was the politically unpopular step of devaluation accompanied by liberalisation. Furthermore, the Indo-Pakistan War of 1965 led the US and other countries friendly towards Pakistan to withdraw foreign aid to India, which necessitated more devaluation. Defense spending in 1965/1966 was 24.06% of total expenditure, the highest it has been in the period from 1965 to 1989 (Foundations, pp 195). Another factor leading to devaluation was the drought of 1965/1966 which resulted in a sharp rise in prices.

At the end of 1969, the Indian Rupee was trading at around 13 British pre-decimal pence (1s 1d), or Rs. 18 = £1. A decade later, by 1979, it was trading at around 6 British new pence (6p). Finally, by the end of 1989, the Indian Rupee had plunged to a then-all-time low of about four British pence (4p). This triggered a wave of irreversible liberalisation reforms away from populist measures.

=== Post Bretton Woods (1970s) ===
Reserve Bank of India and Government of India adopted multiple adjustments to the Indian rupee following the Nixon shock of 1971 and Smithsonian Agreement. The currency gradually shifted from Par value system to pegged system and to basket peg by 1975.

=== 1991 Economic crisis ===
In 1991, India still had a fixed exchange system, where the rupee was pegged to the value of a basket of currencies of major trading partners. India started having the balance of payments problems since 1985, and by the end of 1990, it found itself in serious economic trouble. The government was close to default and its foreign exchange reserves had dried up to the point that India could barely finance three weeks' worth of imports. As in 1966, India faced high inflation and large government budget deficits. This led the government to devalue the rupee.

At the end of 1999, the Indian Rupee was devalued considerably.

=== Revaluation (2000s) ===
In the period between 2000 and 2007, the Rupee stopped declining and stabilised ranging between $1 = ₹44– ₹48. In late 2007, the Indian Rupee reached a record high of 39 Indian national rupee per United States dollars, on account of sustained foreign investment flows into the country. This posed problems for major exporters, IT and BPO firms located in the country who were incurring losses in their earnings given the appreciation in rupee. The trend reversed with the 2008 world financial crisis as Foreign investors transferred huge sums out to their own countries. Such appreciations were reflected in many currencies, e.g. the British sterling pounds, which had gained value against the dollar and then has lost value again with the recession of 2008.

=== 2013 Depreciation ===
Due to stagnant reforms, and declining foreign investment, rupee started depreciating in the early 2013. Measures were announced by the government before this drop to prevent it from dropping further, but none managed to slow down the depreciation. After continued depreciation, and high inflation, the then Prime Minister of India, Manmohan Singh, made a statement in the Parliament of India on the issue. He was of the view that, the present depreciation is partly led by global factors as well as domestic factors. He also asked the political parties to help his Government, tide over the crisis that the country was facing with rupee losing its value.

=== 2016 Demonetisation ===
2016 saw the discontinuation of ₹500 and ₹1,000 notes due to the 2016 Indian bank note demonetisation and consequently the introduction of new a ₹500 note, and a ₹2,000 note- a first for the currency. Later on, new notes of old denominations viz. ₹10, ₹20, ₹50 and ₹100 were issued with old notes of the same value still being legal tender. A ₹200 note, also a first for the Indian Rupee, is currently in circulation.

2023 Currency recall

In May 2023, the Reserve Bank of India started withdrawing the ₹2,000 notes from circulation. The ₹2,000 bank note which was introduced in 2016 however, will remain in legal tender until September 2023 according to RBI. One among the main reason of removing it from circulation is the low rate of its use to the Indian current market economy and its printing was stopped as of 2018 - 2019.

== Banknotes ==
=== Early paper issues ===
Notes issued by the Bank of Bengal can be categorised in the following three series.

- Unifaced series: The early notes of the Bank of Bengal were printed only on one side and were issued as one gold mohur and in denominations of ₹100, ₹250, ₹500, etc.
- Commerce series: Later notes had a vignette representing an allegorical female figure personifying 'commerce'. The notes were printed on both sides. On the obverse the name of the bank and the denominations were printed in three scripts, viz., (Urdu, Bengali and Devanagari). On the reverse of such notes was printed a cartouche with ornamentation carrying the name of the Bank.
- Britannia series: By the late 19th century, the motif 'commerce' was replaced by 'Britannia'. The new banknotes had more features to prevent forgery.

=== British India issues ===
The Paper Currency Act,1861 gave the Government the monopoly of note issue throughout the vast expanse of British India, which was a considerable task. Eventually, the management of paper currency was entrusted to the Mint Masters, the Accountant Generals and the Controller of Currency.

- Victoria portrait series: The first set of British India notes were the 'Victoria Portrait' series issued in denominations of ₹10, ₹20, ₹50, ₹100 and ₹1,000. These were unifaced, carried two language panels. The security features incorporated the watermark, the printed signature and the registration of the notes.
- Underprint series: The unifaced Underprint series was introduced in 1867 as the Victoria Portrait series was withdrawn in the wake of a spate of forgeries. These notes were issued in denominations of ₹5, ₹10, ₹20, ₹50, ₹100, ₹500, ₹1,000 and ₹10,000.
- George V series: A series carrying the portrait of George V were introduced in 1923, and was continued as an integral feature of all paper money issues of British India. These notes were issued in denominations of ₹1, ₹2 1/2, ₹5, ₹10, ₹50, ₹100, ₹1,000, and ₹10,000.

=== Reserve Bank issues during British India ===
The Reserve Bank of India was formally inaugurated on Monday, 1 April 1935 with its Central Office at Calcutta. Section 22 of the RBI Act, 1934, empowered it to continue issuing Government of India notes until its own notes were ready for issue. The bank issued the first five rupee note bearing the portrait of George VI in 1938. This was followed by ₹10 in February, ₹100 in March and ₹1,000 and ₹10,000 in June 1938. The first Reserve Bank issues were signed by the second Governor, Sir James Taylor. In August 1940, the one-rupee note was reintroduced as a wartime measure, as a government note with the status of a rupee coin. During the war, the Japanese produced high-quality forgeries of the Indian currency. This necessitated a change in the watermark. The profile portrait of George VI was changed to his full frontal portrait. The security thread was introduced for the first time in India. The George VI series continued till 1947 and thereafter as a frozen series till 1950 when post-independence notes were issued.

=== Republic of India issues ===
Following the Independence of India the Government of India brought out the new design ₹1 note in 1949. Initially, it was felt that the King's portrait is replaced by a portrait of Mahatma Gandhi. Finally, however, the Lion Capital of Ashoka was chosen. The new design of notes were largely along earlier lines. In 1953, Hindi was displayed prominently on the new notes. The economic crisis in the late 1960s led to a reduction in the size of notes in 1967. High denomination notes, like ₹10,000 notes were demonetized in 1978.

The first "Mahatma Gandhi Series" was introduced in 1996. Prominent new features included a changed watermark, windowed security thread, latent image and intaglio features for the visually handicapped.

The five hundred (₹500) and one thousand rupee notes (₹1,000) were demonetised by an unscheduled address to the nation by Prime Minister Narendra Modi starting from midnight 8 November 2016. These notes are being replaced by the Mahatma Gandhi New Series of notes.

== Valuation history ==
INR value against USD

The rupee was never equal to the dollar. At the time of independence (in 1947), India's currency was pegged to pound sterling, and the exchange rate was a shilling and six pence for a rupee – which worked out to ₹13.33 to the pound. The dollar-pound exchange rate then was $4.03 to the pound, which in effect gave a rupee-dollar rate in 1947 of around ₹3.30. The pound was devalued in 1949, changing its parity from 4.03 to 2.80. India was then a part of the sterling area, and the rupee was devalued on the same day by the same percentage so that the new dollar exchange rate in 1949 became ₹4.76 – which is where it stayed till the rupee devaluation of 1966 made it ₹7.50 to the dollar and the pound moved to ₹21.

Year	Exchange rate (₹ per $)
1947	3.30
1949	4.76
1966	7.50
1975	8.39
1980	6.61
1985	12.38
1990	17.01
1995 (Jan)	37.69
2000 (Jan)	44.31
2005 (Jan)	43.50
2006 (Jan)	46.92
2007 (Jan)	49.32
2008 (Jan)	43.30
2009 (1 Jan)	48.82
2010 (January)	46.02
2011 (1 Jan)	44.65
2012 (1 Jan)	53.06
2013 (1 Jan)	54.78
2014 (1 Jan)	61.86
2014 (15 May)	59.44
2014 (12 Sep)	60.95
2015 (15 Apr)	62.30
2015 (15 May)	64.22
2015 (19 Sep)	65.87
2015 (30 Nov)	66.79
2016 (20 Jan)	68.01
2016 (25 Jan)	67.63
2016 (25 Feb)	68.82
2016 (14 April)	66.56
2016 (22 Sep)	67.02
2016 (24 Nov)	67.63
2017 (28 Mar)	65.04
2017 (28 April)	64.27
2017 (15 May)	64.05
2017 (14 August)	64.13
2017 (24 October)	64.94
2018 (9 May)	64.80
2018 (5 Oct)	74.09
2018 (9 Oct)	74.35
2018 (22 Oct)	73.66
2018 (13 Nov)	72.56
2018 (4 Dec)	70.64
2019 (6 Jan)	69.53
2019 (12 Jan)	70.37
2019 (1 Feb)	71.44
2019 (10 July)	68.37
2019 (13 Nov)	72.15
2020 (15 Jan)	70.72
2020 (6 March)	74.00
2020 (21 April)	76.97
2020 (5 Nov)	74.31
2021 (14 April)	75.07
2021 (22 May)	72.91
2021 (12 June)	73.23
2021 (5 August)	74.18
2021 (7 December)	75.45
2022 (5 July)	79.27
2022 (18 July)	80.03
2022 (17 November)	81.62
2023 (8 January)	82.52
2025 (3 February)	87.29

== Other issues ==
In Mozambique the British India rupees were overstamped, and in Kenya the British East Africa company minted the rupee and its fractions as well as pice. It was maintained as the florin, using the same standard, until 1920. In Somalia the Italian colonial authority minted 'Rupia' to exactly the same standard, and called the paisa 'besa'. Early 18th-century E.I.C. rupees were used in Australia for a limited period.

- Jammu and Kashmir issues: Maharaja Ranbir Singh introduced paper money on watermarked paper in 1877. The notes were not very popular and were in circulation for a very short period. The notes carried the 'Sun' motif of the Dogra family.
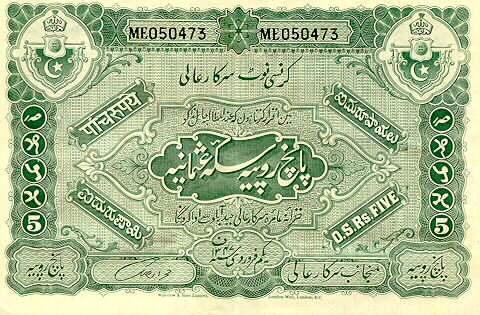
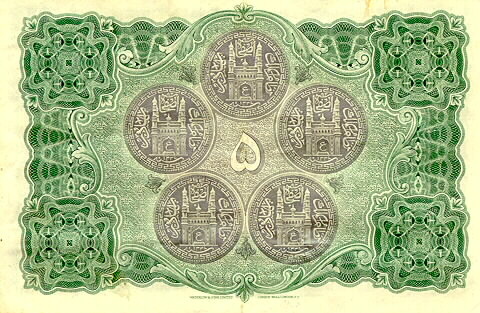
Five-rupee note from Hyderabad
- Hyderabad issues: The Government of Hyderabad had made several efforts to organize private bankers to set up a banking company which could issue paper money. The British, however, resisted the attempts of Indian princely states to issue paper currency. The acute shortage of silver during the First World War and the contributions of Hyderabad State to the British war effort led them to accept, in 1918, paper currency in denominations of ₹10/- and ₹100/- issued under the Hyderabad Currency Act. The currency was designated the Osmania Sicca (OS). Rupee One and Rupees Five notes were issued subsequently in 1919 and Rupees One Thousand notes were issued in 1926. After the setting up of the India Currency Notes Press at Nasik, Hyderabad notes came to be printed there.
- Burma issues: Burma separated from India in 1938; however, the Reserve Bank of India acted as Banker to the Government of Burma and was responsible for note issue in terms of the Burma Monetary Arrangements Order, 1937. In May 1938 the Bank issued Burma notes which were not legal tender in India.
- Indo-French issues: The French Indian rupee (FIR) was introduced by France's Bank of Indochina in French colonies of India.
- Indo-Portuguese issues : The Portuguese Indian Rupia was the currency of Portuguese India until 1959. It was divisible into 16 Tangas or 960 Reis. In 1959, the currency was changed to the Portuguese Indian Escudo, at the rate of 1 Rupia for 6 Escudos.
- Persian Gulf issues: For many years in the early and mid-20th century, the Indian rupee was the official currency in several areas that were controlled by the British and governed from India: areas such as East Africa, Southern Arabia and the Persian Gulf. The rupees used in the Persian Gulf had been bought by the Gulf states from the Reserve Bank of India, who held the sterling reserves by which the rupees had originally been purchased. However, Indian rupees were being smuggled from India to the states of the Persian Gulf in exchange for gold. It was estimated in 1959 that the total amount of gold in private hands in India was about US$1.75 to 2 billion – roughly two-thirds of the value of paper money in circulation. While it was legal to own and to trade in gold within India, it was illegal to import or export gold. The Gulf Rupee, also known as the Persian Gulf Rupee (PGR), was introduced by the Indian government as a replacement for the Indian Rupee for circulation exclusively outside the country with the Reserve Bank of India Amendment Act, 1 May 1959. After India devalued the rupee in June 1966, those countries still using it – Oman, Qatar and what is now the United Arab Emirates (known as the Trucial States until 1971) – replaced the Gulf Rupee with their own currencies. Kuwait and Bahrain had already done so in 1961 and 1965 respectively.
- Emergency issues, Princely states: During the 1940s, when mints were occupied for use in the war, an acute scarcity of small coins was felt throughout India. Princely states in Western India like Balvan, Bikaner, Bundi, Gondal, Indergadh, Junagadh, Jasdan, Kutch Mengni, Muli, Morvi, Mangrol, Nawanagar, Nawalgarh Palitana, Rajkot, Sailana, Sayla, Vithalgadh, issued "Cash Coupons" to meet the shortage.
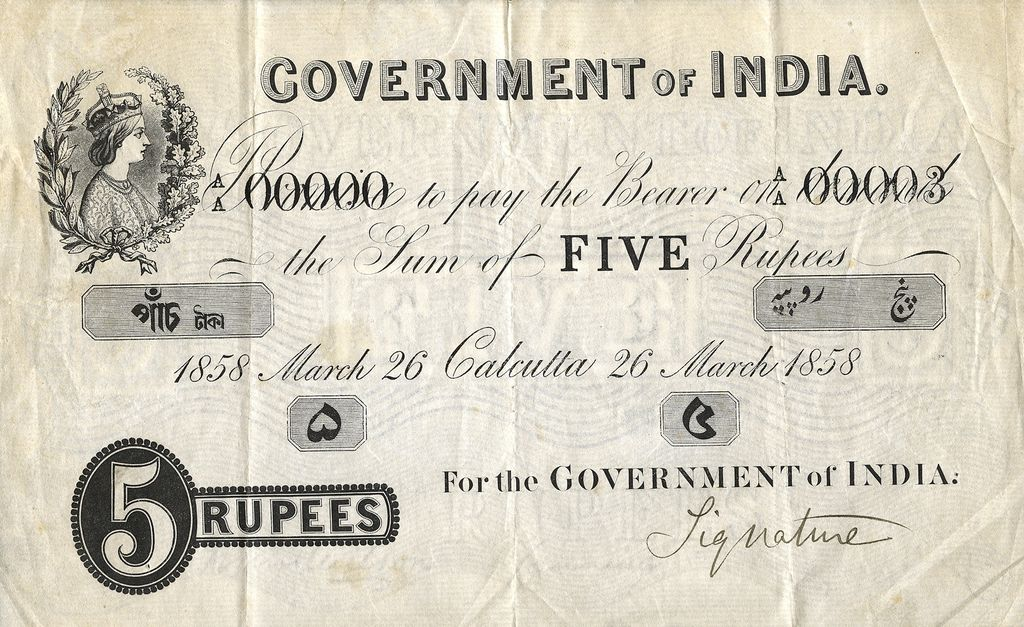
Government of India 5 Rupee note (1858)

Hyderabad State OS Rupee 100 issue

Five rupees, 1922

Portuguese Indian 1 rupee, 1924

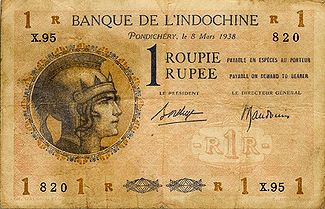
French Indian 1 rupee, 1938

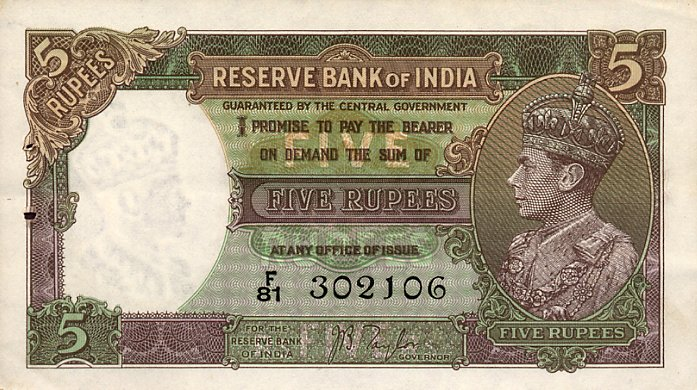
George VI profile portrait, RBI, 1937

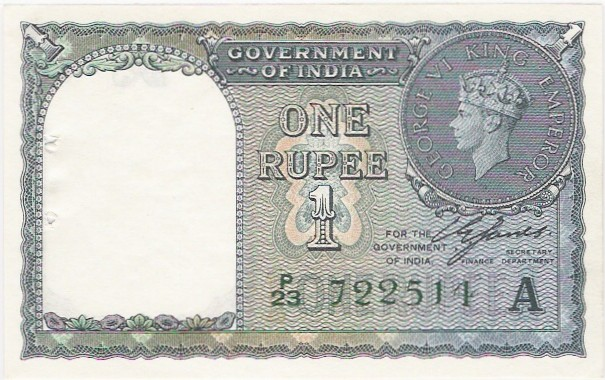
One rupee, British India

George VI profile portrait changed to frontal portrait, RBI, 1943

== See also ==
- Exchange rate history of the Indian rupee
- The Revised Standard Reference Guide to Indian Paper Money
- Rupee
- Indian rupee
- Mauritian rupee
- Pakistani rupee
- Nepalese rupee
- Coinage of India
- Coins of British India
- History of the taka
