= Bank of Bombay (1720) =

Indian bank (now dissolved)

- Type: Public sector
- Industry: Banking, Insurance, Capital Markets and allied industries
- Founded: 1720
- Founder: East India Company
- Defunct: 31 March 1770
- Fate: Defunct
- Headquarters: Bombay, India
- Number of locations: Bombay Presidency
- Area served: India
- Products: Deposits, Personal Banking Schemes, C & I Banking Schemes, Agri Banking Schemes, SME Banking Schemes
- Services: Loans, Deposits

The Bank of Bombay was the second-oldest bank in India after The Madras Bank (1683). It was started in 1720, and lasted until 1770.

The bank is one of the three oldest Banks in India, along with The Madras Bank (1683) and the Bank of Hindostan.

== History ==
=== Founding ===
The bank was founded in 1720. The initial capital of the bank was 100,000 rupees and the amount was financed by the East India Company.

The bank was founded by the British employees of the East India Company in Bombay, Bombay Presidency. The Bank's initial headquarters were in the Bombay Castle.

=== Management ===
The bank was staffed by mostly British nationals who were drawn mainly from the East India Company.

The bank was managed by the government of the Bombay Presidency.

=== Final Years ===
In the 1760s, the bank owned a sum of 28,00,000 rupees to its creditors. Moreover the assets mortgaged to the Bank had fallen into disrepair. The bank found itself in a precarious financial situation. The government of the Bombay Presidency decided to write off the dues of the bank and establish a new bank with the same name to take its place.

The Bank wound up its operations in 1770.

== Legacy ==
The bank is chiefly notable for being only the second bank founded in India, making it older than all other Indian banks except The Madras Bank (1683).

In 1840, another bank of the same name was founded to take its place. However this 1840 bank has survived to the present day in the form of the State Bank of India, through its predecessor the Imperial Bank of India.

== See also ==
- Indian banking
- List of oldest banks in India
- List of banks in India
