= The Cawnpore Bank =

Commercial bank

- Company type: Private sector
- Industry: Financial services
- Founded: 1 May 1845 as The Cawnpore Bank
- Defunct: 31 March 1852
- Fate: Defunct
- Headquarters: Kanpur, India
- Number of locations: United Provinces of British India
- Area served: India
- Products: Deposits, Personal Banking Schemes, C & I Banking Schemes, Agri Banking Schemes, SME Banking Schemes
- Services: Banking, Insurance, Capital Markets and allied industries

The Cawnpore Bank (1845) was an Indian bank that operated between 1845 and 1852 in British India. It was founded in the year 1845 under the company rule in India and became defunct in the year 1852 with the winding down of its operations. The bank was notable for being the thirty first oldest bank in India.

== History ==
=== Founding ===
The Cawnpore Bank was founded in 1845 in Kanpur, India.

The bank was well known for providing stiff competition to the then Bank of Bengal, which is a precursor of today's State Bank of India.

=== Management ===
The bank was staffed by mostly British nationals who were drawn mainly from the East India Company.

The bank was headquartered in the Kanpur city in the United Provinces.

=== Final years ===
In 1851, the bank was on the verge of failure.

The bank was finally closed in the year 1852.

== Legacy ==
The bank is notable for being the thirty first oldest bank in India.

The bank played a key role in the history of Banking in India.

== See also ==
- Indian banking
- List of banks in India
