= The Bank of India =

Bank established in 1828

- Type: Private sector
- Industry: Banking, insurance, capital markets and allied industries
- Founded: 1 April 1828
- Defunct: 31 March 1829
- Fate: defunct in 1829
- Headquarters: India
- Number of locations: Bengal Presidency
- Area served: India
- Products: Deposits, personal banking schemes, C & I banking schemes, agri banking schemes, SME banking schemes
- Services: Banking, trade finance

The Bank of India was a bank founded in the year 1828 in British India and was closed down one year later in 1829. It was the thirteenth oldest bank in India.

== History ==
=== Founding ===
Raj Kissen Dutt founded the bank in 1828. It closed down in 1829. The bank played a major role in the early economic history of East Bengal and Bangladesh.

=== Fate ===
The bank issued its own currency notes in its one year of existence. However, many of the currency notes issued by the bank were found to have been forged.

The bank closed and was liquidated in 1829.

== Legacy ==
The bank is notable for being the thirteenth oldest bank in India. It is also notable for being one of the first institutions in India to issue its own paper banknotes or currency notes. The Paper Currency Act, 1861, abolished the right of private banks to issue their own currency notes.

== See also ==
- Indian banking
- List of banks in India
- List of oldest banks in India
