= The North Western Bank of India =

Indian bank

The North Western Bank of India (1840)
- Company type: Private sector
- Industry: Banking, Insurance, Capital Markets and allied industries
- Founded: 1 April 1840; 186 years ago as The North Western Bank of India (1840)
- Defunct: 31 March 1859
- Fate: defunct in 1859
- Headquarters: India
- Number of locations: Mussoorie and Meerut
- Area served: India
- Products: Deposits, Personal Banking Schemes, C & I Banking Schemes, Agri Banking Schemes, SME Banking Schemes
- Services: Banking, Trade Finance

The North Western Bank of India (1840) was a bank founded in the year 1840 in Mussoorie, British India. The bank was the nineteenth oldest bank in India.

== History ==
=== Founding ===
The bank was founded in 1840 in Mussoorie by English businessmen. The headquarters of the bank were later shifted to Meerut.

The bank was initially named as the Mussoorie Bank. After its headquarter was moved to Meerut, the bank was renamed as The North Western Bank of India.

The seven earliest directors of the bank were: T. F. Blois, William M. George, H. S. Ravenshaw, William Freeth, J. Angelo, W. H. Orde and R. Willis.

=== Management ===
The bank's area of operations was largely centered around the United Provinces of British India, which corresponds to the present day states of Uttar Pradesh and Uttarakhand. Both Mussoorie and Meerut were located in this same province or region. Most of the earliest employees of the bank were sourced from the Chartered Bank of India, Australia and China.

Some of the branches of the North Western Bank also operated from the branches of the Chartered Bank of India, Australia and China

=== Final Years ===
In its later years, the bank was headquartered in Calcutta and had opened branches in London, Mussoorie, Bombay and Singapore.

The bank was finally liquidated in 1859, as it was unable to withstand the competition from more well capitalized banks.

== Legacy ==
The bank is notable for being the nineteenth oldest bank in India.

== See also ==
- Indian banking
- List of banks in India
- List of oldest banks in India
