= The Benares Bank =

Defunct Indian bank

- Company type: Private sector
- Industry: Banking, Insurance, Capital Markets and allied industries
- Founded: 1 May 1844 as The Benares Bank
- Defunct: 31 March 1850
- Fate: Defunct in 1850
- Headquarters: Varanasi, India
- Number of locations: United Provinces
- Area served: India
- Products: Deposits, Personal Banking Schemes, C & I Banking Schemes, Agri Banking Schemes, SME Banking Schemes
- Services: Banking, Trade Finance

The Benares Bank was a bank founded in the year 1844 in British India. The bank became defunct in the year 1850 with the winding down of its operations. The bank was notable for being the twenty eighth oldest bank in India.

== History ==
=== Founding ===
The Benares Bank was founded in 1844 in Varanasi, India.

The bank largely served the customers of the United Provinces, which today corresponds to the Uttar Pradesh state of India.

=== Management ===
The bank was staffed by mostly British nationals who were drawn mainly from the East India Company.

The bank was headquartered in the Varanasi city in the United Provinces.

=== Final years ===
In 1849, the bank was on the verge of failure.

The bank was finally closed in the year 1850.

== Legacy ==
The bank is notable for being the twenty eighth oldest bank in India.

The bank played a key role in the history of Banking in India.

== See also ==
- Indian banking
- List of banks in India
