= The Agra Savings Fund =

Defunct Indian bank

- Company type: Private sector
- Industry: Banking, Insurance, Capital Markets and allied industries
- Founded: 1 May 1842 as The Agra Savings Fund
- Defunct: 31 March 1863
- Fate: Defunct in 1863
- Headquarters: Agra, India
- Number of locations: United Provinces
- Area served: India
- Key people: Elizabeth Jahans
- Products: Deposits, Personal Banking Schemes, C & I Banking Schemes, Agri Banking Schemes, SME Banking Schemes
- Services: Banking, Trade Finance

The Agra Savings Fund (1842) was a bank founded in the year 1842 in British India. The bank became defunct in the year 1863 with the winding down of its operations. The bank was notable for being the twenty fifth oldest bank in India.

== History ==
=== Founding ===
The Agra Savings Fund was founded in 1842 in Agra, India.

The bank largely served the customers of the United Provinces, which today corresponds to the Uttar Pradesh state of India.

=== Management ===
The bank was staffed by mostly British nationals who were drawn mainly from the East India Company. Elizabeth Jahans (a European Portuguese woman residing in India) was one of the directors of the bank.

The bank was headquartered in the Agra city in the United Provinces.

=== Final years ===
In 1862, the bank was on the verge of failure.

The bank was finally closed in the year 1863.

== Legacy ==
The bank is notable for being the twenty fifth oldest bank in India.

The bank played a key role in the history of Banking in India.

== See also ==
- Indian banking
- List of banks in India
