= List of oldest banks in India =

This list of the oldest banks in Indian subcontinent includes financial institutions that were founded in the 18th and 19th centuries. Listed are the forty oldest banks in India, which includes all financial institutions founded prior to 1850.

The oldest bank in India is The Madras Bank, followed by the Bank of Bombay, founded in 1720, which is then followed by the Bank of Hindustan, founded in 1770.

Imperial Bank of India was succeeded by State Bank of India in 1955 and State Bank of Pakistan in 1948 respectively whose origins can be traced back to the Bank of Calcutta. It was founded in 1806, although some of its precursors are even older, this includes the The Madras Bank.

Rank	Name of bank	Year of founding	Year of closing	Present status	Headquartered in	References
1	The Madras Bank	1683	1843	Merged to form Bank of Madras, presently the State Bank of India	Madras Presidency	
2	Bank of Bombay	1720	1770	Defunct	Bombay	
3	Bank of Hindustan	1770	1832	Defunct	Calcutta	
4	General Bank of Bengal and Bihar	1773	1775	Defunct	Calcutta	
5	Bengal Bank	1784	1791	Defunct	Calcutta	
6	General Bank of India	1786	1791	Defunct	Calcutta	
7	Carnatic Bank	1788	1843	Merged to form Bank of Madras, presently the State Bank of India	Madras Presidency	
8	British Bank of Madras	1795	1843	Merged to form Bank of Madras, presently the State Bank of India	Madras Presidency	
9	The Asiatic Bank	1804	1843	Merged to form Bank of Madras, presently the State Bank of India	Madras Presidency	
10	Bank of Calcutta	1806	1921	Merged with the Imperial Bank of India, presently the State Bank of India	Calcutta	
11	The Commercial Bank	1819	1828	Merged with The Calcutta Bank to form The Union Bank	Calcutta	
12	Calcutta Bank	1824	1828	Merged with The Commercial Bank to form The Union Bank	Calcutta	
13	The Bank of India	1828	1829	Defunct	Calcutta	
14	The Union Bank	1828	1848	Defunct	Calcutta	
15	The Government Savings Bank	1833	1843	Defunct	Calcutta	
16	The Agra & United Service Bank	1833	1866	Defunct	Agra	
17	The Bank of Mirzapore	1835	1837	Defunct	Mirzapur	
18	Bank of India	1836	1836	Defunct	Calcutta	
19	The North Western Bank of India	1840	1859	Defunct	Mussoorie	
20	Bank of Bombay	1840	1921	Merged with the Imperial Bank of India, presently the State Bank of India	Bombay	
21	Bank of Asia	1841	1842	Defunct	London	
22	The Bank of Ceylon	1841	1849	Merged with the Oriental Bank Corporation	Colombo	
23	The East India Bank	1842	1842	Defunct	London	
24	The Oriental Bank Corporation	1842	1884	Defunct	Bombay	
25	The Agra Savings Fund	1842	1863	Defunct	Agra	
26	The Bank of Madras	1843	1921	Merged with the Imperial Bank of India, presently the State Bank of India	Madras Presidency	
27	Delhi Bank Corporation	1844	1916	Merged with the Alliance Bank of Simla	Delhi	
28	The Benares Bank	1844	1850	Defunct	Benares	
29	The Simla Bank Limited	1844	1893	Defunct	Shimla	
30	The Commercial Bank of India	1845	1866	Defunct	Bombay	
31	The Cawnpore Bank	1845	1852	Defunct	Kanpur	
32	The Dacca Bank	1846	1862	Merged with the Bank of Bengal, presently State Bank of India	Dhaka	
33	The London Bank of Australia and India	1852	1852	Defunct	Agra	
34	Chartered Bank of Asia	1852	1855	Defunct	London	
35	Chartered Mercantile Bank of India, London & China	1853	1853	Defunct	London	
36	Chartered Bank of India, Australia and China	1853	1853	Defunct	London	
37	The London and Eastern Banking Corporation	1854	1857	Defunct	London	
38	The Comptoir D'Escompte of Paris	1854	1854	Defunct	Paris	

== Locations of headquarters ==
The below cities are frequently listed among the headquarters of the banks mentioned in the above table.

Rank	Name of city	Number of ancient banks headquartered
1	Calcutta	11
2	London	6
3	Madras	5
4	Bombay	4
5	Agra	3

== See also ==
- History of banking
- Banking in India
- List of oldest companies
- List of oldest companies in India
- Lindy effect
