= The Bank of Mirzapore =

Bank in British Raj

- Type: Private company
- Industry: Financing
- Founded: 1 April 1835
- Founder: Mr. Bathurst
- Defunct: 31 March 1837
- Fate: Liquidated
- Headquarters: Mirzapur, India
- Area served: India
- Products: Deposits, Personal banking
- Services: Banking, Trade Finance

The Bank of Mirzapore was a bank founded in the year 1835 in British India. The bank was the seventeenth oldest bank in India. It was liquidated in 1937.

== History ==
=== Founding ===
The bank was founded in 1835 in Mirzapur by a Mr. Bathurst, a businessman from England who had arrived in India with a hope of striking it big in the banking industry.

The bank printed its own notes and achieved a modest level of success in the bill discounting of its notes.

=== Management ===
The bank was known for its punctuality and it soon gained the confidence of merchants and traders of Calcutta who came to rely on it for their banking needs. The owner of the bank Mr. Bathurst was able to build a large house in Mirzapur due to the success of his bank.

=== Final Years ===
The bank faced a lot of competition from the Bank of Calcutta which had opened at around the same time and enjoyed the patronage of the East India Company. By 1837, the Bank of Mirzapore was unable to scale up its operations and was not able to compete with the Bank of Calcutta. The Bank of Mirzapore was finally liquidate in 1937.

== Legacy ==
The bank is notable for being the seventeenth oldest bank in India.

== See also ==
- Indian banking
- List of banks in India
- List of oldest banks in India
