= History of paper currency in the Indian subcontinent =

Many European trading companies came to India's during the 18th century. These trading companies set up private banks which issued paper currencies in Indian subcontinent first. But these notes were text-based. Charles Canning, 1st Earl Canning first introduced paper currency in Indian subcontinent in 1861 officially.

India has a rich tradition of financial instruments and hundi. In the modern sense, paper currency was introduced in India in the last half of the eighteenth century when private and semi-public banks began to introduce currency. The Paper Currency Act, 1861 gave the Government of India the exclusive right to print and circulate banknotes and thereby abolishes the printing and circulation of banknotes by the private Presidency Banks. Until the establishment of the Reserve Bank of India on 1 April 1935, the Government of India continued to print and issue banknotes.

== Reason ==
The expansionist strategies of the East India Company led Bengal to a scarcity of gold and silver bullion. Sensing an emerging credit crisis, the British official introduced paper currency in India.

== Historical overview ==
Warren Hastings established the Bank of Hindostan (1770–1832) which was considered the general bank in Bengal and Bihar (1773–75) and the Bank of Bengal (1784–91) issued the bank notes initially. The government formed by the East India Company did not recognize these paper currencies officially. These were restricted promissory currencies and only legal for private uses. Because of financial mishandling, the three banks were shut down and these notes were non-starters even in 1832. After the enactment of the paper currency act in 1861, a series of banknotes and coins were issued in the honor of Queen Victoria in 1862 with her portrait on them.

As the business of counterfeit notes increased, this new chain was introduced in 1867 and was divided into 5, 10, 20, 50, 100, 500, 1,000 and 10,000 rupees notes. In 1923, another series with the portrait of George V was introduced. It was divided into 1, 26, 5, 10, 50, 100, 1,000 and 10,000 rupees notes.

In January 1936, the Reserve Bank of India first issued five rupee notes containing the portrait of King George VI. Then in 10 February rupee notes, in March 100 rupee notes and in June 1938 1000 and 10000 rupee notes were released. Notes with a portrait of King George VI were issued in 1948 and later until 1950, after which notes with a picture of the Ashoka Pillar were issued.
