= The Simla Bank Limited =

Defunct Indian bank

- Company type: Private sector
- Industry: Banking, Insurance, Capital Markets and allied industries
- Founded: 19 November 1844 as The Simla Bank Limited
- Defunct: 31 March 1893
- Fate: Defunct in 1893
- Headquarters: Shimla, India
- Number of locations: Himachal Pradesh
- Area served: India
- Products: Deposits, Personal Banking Schemes, C & I Banking Schemes, Agri Banking Schemes, SME Banking Schemes
- Services: Banking, Trade Finance

The Simla Bank Limited (1844) was a bank founded in the year 1844 in British India. The bank became defunct in the year 1893 with the winding down of its operations. The bank was notable for being the twenty ninth oldest bank in India.

== History ==
=== Founding ===
The Simla Bank Limited was founded in 1844 in Shimla, India.

The bank largely served the customers near the city of Shimla, which today corresponds to the Himachal Pradesh state of India.

=== Management ===
The first Secretary of the bank was Dr. Carte. He was succeeded by Mr. Arnold H. Matthews, who continued attached to the Bank till 1854, when he was appointed Agent for the Agra United Service Bank at Agra.

The headquarters of this Bank are at Simla. It had branches at Ambala, Calcutta, Lahore, Mussoorie, Delhi, Agra, Bombay, and Madras.

=== Final years ===
In 1892, the bank was on the verge of failure.

The bank was finally closed in the year 1893.

== Legacy ==
The bank is notable for being the twenty ninth oldest bank in India.

The bank played a key role in the history of Banking in India.

== See also ==
- Indian banking
- List of banks in India
