= Bengal Bank =

Bank in India

- Company type: Private sector
- Industry: Banking, Insurance, Capital Markets and allied industries
- Founded: 1 April 1784; 242 years ago as The Bengal Bank
- Defunct: 31 March 1791
- Fate: Defunct
- Headquarters: India
- Number of locations: Bengal Presidency
- Area served: India
- Products: Deposits, Personal Banking Schemes, C & I Banking Schemes, Agri Banking Schemes, SME Banking Schemes
- Services: Banking, Trade Finance

The Bengal Bank was a bank founded in 1784 in British India. The bank was the fifth oldest bank in India.

The bank became defunct on March 31, 1791.

== History ==
=== Founding ===
The bank was established in 1784 by private entrepreneurs.

The bank has played a major role in the early economic history of East Bengal and Bangladesh.

=== Management ===
Although the bank was largely a private bank, it enjoyed patronage from the then government of India, the East India Company.

The bank was staffed by mostly British nationals who were drawn mainly from the East India Company.

The bank had most of its offices and branches in East Bengal, which is present day Bangladesh.

=== Final years ===
The bank lasted in business for only seven years and was finally closed in 1791.

The bank also issued its own currency notes in its seven years of existence.

== Legacy ==
The bank is notable for being the fifth oldest bank in India. It is also notable for being one of the first institutions in India to issue its own paper banknotes or currency notes.

The ability of private banks to issue their own currency notes was taken away by The Paper Currency Act, 1861.

The bank is also notable for being the very first bank in India to issue cheques and chequebooks to its customers. This innovation was later adopted by all other banks in India.

== See also ==
- Indian banking
- List of banks in India
- List of oldest banks in India
