= Alexander and Co. =

1700s–1832 Agency House in British India

Alexander and Company
- Company type: Agency House
- Founded: 18th century in British India
- Founders: Scottish traders and merchants
- Headquarters: Fort William, India, Calcutta, Calcutta, Bengal Presidency, British India
- Area served: British India
- Services: Trading and Banking

Alexander and Company, Limited, often simply called Alexander and Co., was an Agency House in British India founded by traders and merchants from Scotland. Alexander and Co. has made several pioneering contributions to the economy of India. Alexander and Co. was the promoter and founder of India's very first bank, the Bank of Hindostan.

== History ==
=== Background ===
Before the advent of joint-stock banking companies in India, the role of banks was played by agency houses. The agency houses performed various quasi-banking functions which included but were not limited to:

- Accepting deposits (Agency houses accepted deposits only from British nationals and other Europeans)
- Financing trade
- Lending of money (primarily to the Government)

=== Business ===
After their initial success, the agency houses started lending money to European entrepreneurs in India and not just the Government. The Alexander and Co. agency house also lent money to several European entrepreneurs, the most notable among them was Josiah Marshall Heath, an English metallurgist who owned several mining ventures in British India.

An amount of Rupees 100,000 had been loaned to Josiah Marshall Heath by the Alexander and Co. agency house in order to finance his mining related ventures. He used the sum to start the Porto Novo Steel and Iron Company. By 1832, he was unable to repay the debt, and this contributed to the failure of the Alexander and Co. agency house.

=== Bank of Hindostan ===
After having experimented with lending and other banking activities, the Alexander and Co. agency house separated its banking activities and divested it into a separate banking company which was named the Bank of Hindostan. The Bank of Hindostan was notable for being one of the oldest banks in India.

=== Failure ===
The Alexander and Co. agency house failed in the year 1832 due to major economic downturn affecting the British India. The main cause of the economic crisis was the unexpected fall in the prices of commodities such as Indigo. As a result and consequence of its failure, the Bank of Hindostan also failed and had to be liquidated in the very same year.

== Legacy ==
The legacy of the Alexander and Co. and its role in shaping the economic fortunes of India have been widely recognized. It has been credited as a major pioneer in the history of Banking in India.

The failure of the early Indian financial firms also led to the passing of the Companies Act, 1860 which granted limited liability to banking companies. Many of the early Indian Banks had been partnership firms with unlimited liability.

== See also ==
- Banking in India
- Economy of India under Company rule
- Company rule in India
