= Government Savings Bank =

Government Savings Bank may refer to:

- Government Savings Bank (Thailand)
- The Government Savings Bank (1833), a historical bank in British India
- Queensland Government Savings Bank, a historical bank in Australia
