= General Bank of India =

18th-century bank

- Type: Public sector
- Industry: Banking, Insurance, Capital Markets and allied industries
- Founded: 1786
- Founder: East India Company
- Defunct: 31 March 1791
- Fate: Defunct
- Headquarters: Calcutta, Calcutta
- Number of locations: Bengal Presidency
- Area served: India
- Products: Deposits, Personal Banking Schemes, C & I Banking Schemes, Agri Banking Schemes, SME Banking Schemes
- Services: Loans, Deposits

The General Bank of India was a bank founded in the 18th century and lasted till 1791.

== History ==
The Bank was the sixth oldest bank in India.

In the 18th century, Calcutta had become a centre of trade and commercial activities of the East India Company. Most of British commercial agencies, businesses, export houses and private industry were headquartered in Calcutta. All of these businesses were staffed and managed by British expatriates in India. A need was felt for a bank which would cater to the needs of these people. As a result, the General Bank of India was founded in 1786 in Calcutta.

The bank was staffed by employees, who were mostly British nationals and drawn mainly from the East India Company.

== Legacy ==
The bank is largely notable for being the sixth oldest bank in India.

The bank also played a major role in making the city of Calcutta, the economic and financial centre of British India. Calcutta thus came to be known as the second city of the British Empire.

== See also ==
- Indian banking
- List of banks in India
- List of oldest banks in India
