= General Bank of Bengal and Bihar =

Bank in British India

- Company type: Private company
- Industry: Banking, Insurance, Capital Markets and allied industries
- Founded: 1 April 1773 (as The General Bank of Bengal and Bihar)
- Founder: Warren Hastings
- Defunct: 31 March 1775
- Fate: Defunct
- Headquarters: India
- Number of locations: Bengal Presidency
- Area served: India
- Key people: Warren Hastings
- Products: Deposits, Personal Banking Schemes, C & I Banking Schemes, Agri Banking Schemes, SME Banking Schemes
- Services: Banking, Trade Finance

The General Bank of Bengal and Bihar (alternate spelling: General Bank of Bengal and Bahar) was a bank in British India that operated between 1773 and 1775.

It was founded in the year 1773 when India was under control of the East India Company. The bank was the fourth oldest bank in India. The bank became defunct March 31, 1775 having operated for only two years.

== History ==
=== Founding ===
The bank was established in 1773 by Warren Hastings, the first Viceroy of India.

During the early years of the British rule in India, a need was felt for a bank that would service the British employees of the East India Company. Many banks were founded as a result, and the General Bank of Bengal and Bihar was one such bank.

=== Management ===
Although the bank was largely a private bank, it enjoyed patronage from the then government of India, the East India Company.

The bank was staffed by mostly British nationals who were drawn mainly from the East India Company.

=== Final Years ===
The bank lasted in business for only two years and was finally closed in 1775.

The bank also issued its own currency notes in its two years of existence.

== Legacy ==
The bank is notable for being the fourth oldest bank in India. It is also notable for being one of the first institutions in India to issue its own paper banknotes or currency notes.

The ability of private banks to issue their own currency notes was taken away by The Paper Currency Act, 1861.

== See also ==
- Indian banking
- List of banks in India
- List of oldest banks in India
