= Sahukar =

A Sahukar is a money lender, who provides loans to people for specific interest in India.

Having dominated the money lending system since the arrival of the British in South Asia, Sahukars serve as one of the most important means for an informal credit system in India.
