= The Government Savings Bank (1833) =

Bank established in India in 1833

- Company type: Public sector
- Industry: Banking, Insurance, Capital Markets and allied industries
- Founded: 1 April 1833 as The Government Savings Bank (1833)
- Defunct: 31 March 1843
- Fate: Liquidated
- Headquarters: Kolkata, India
- Number of locations: Bengal Presidency
- Area served: India
- Products: Deposits, Personal Banking Schemes, C & I Banking Schemes, Agri Banking Schemes, SME Banking Schemes
- Services: Banking, Trade Finance

The Government Savings Bank (1833) was an Indian bank founded in 1833 in British India and operated until it was liquidated in 1843. The bank was the fifteenth oldest bank in India.

== History ==
=== Founding ===
The bank was founded in 1833 in Kolkata. Two more branches were opened at Bombay (Mumbai) and Madras (Chennai) in 1833 and 1834 with maximum deposit limit of Rs 500 at 4 per cent interest.

The bank played a major role in the early economic history of East Bengal and Bangladesh.

=== Management ===
The bank had its branches in each of the three Presidencies of British India: Bombay, Madras and Bengal (Calcutta). These branches were later merged into a single entity.

=== Final Years ===
The bank was finally closed and liquidated in 1843.

== Legacy ==
The bank is notable for being the fifteenth oldest bank in India.

The bank was the spiritual predecessor of the India Post Payments Bank.

== See also ==
- Indian banking
- List of banks in India
- List of oldest banks in India
