= Deposit slip =

Banking depositing form

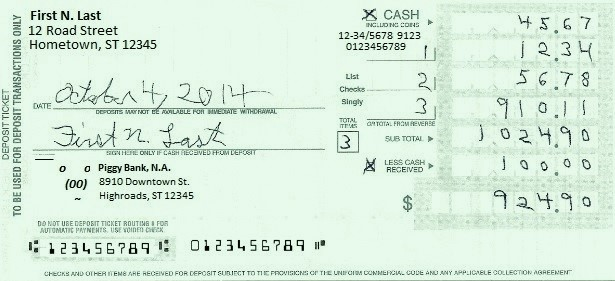
A deposit slip allowing cash back

A deposit slip or a pay-in-slip is a form supplied by a bank for a depositor to fill out, designed to document in categories the items included in the deposit transaction when physically depositing at a bank. The categories include type of item, and if it is a cheque or cash and which bank it is from, such as a local bank or not.

The bank teller keeps the deposit slip along with the deposit (cash and cheques), and provides the depositor with a receipt. Slips can be filled in prior to attending the bank, making depositing money more convenient. They are also used when transporting money. Pay-in slips encourage the sorting of cash and coins, are filled in and signed by the person who deposited the money, and some tear off from a record that is also filled in by the depositor.

Deposit slips are also called deposit tickets and come in a variety of designs. They are signed by the depositor if the depositor is cashing some of the accompanying check and depositing the rest.

== Cash received ==
On a deposit slip, "cash received" means that part of the amount on a cheque that is to be withdrawn as cash. The remainder is deposited into the person's account.

== Completion of slips ==
The description column on deposit slips has been used for over 100 years in the U.S. to notate where the bank should send the check to reclaim the money; this was done at first by notating in words the name of bank or its location. The bank's transit number, also called bank number, began to be used instead of words. The bank number was written as the upper line of a fraction, with the bottom number referring to the central bank branch. Some people wrote just the top of the fraction, others tried writing the entire fraction. After the introduction of automated sorting of checks, many people wrote nothing at all in the deposit slip's description column. Some people put the check writers' names in the description column. There was a tendency in the early 2010s to write in the number of the check being deposited without mentioning who the check was from.

With the rise of remote deposit through mobile banking apps, the requirement to scan a deposit slip in addition to the check scan varies by each institution's policies.

== See also ==
- Passbook
- Bank statement
- Cheque book
- Deposit account
