= The Dacca Bank =

Indian bank

- Type: Private sector
- Industry: Banking, Insurance, Capital Markets and allied industries
- Founded: 1 April 1846; 180 years ago
- Defunct: 31 March 1862
- Fate: merged with the Bank of Bengal in 1862
- Headquarters: British India
- Number of locations: Dhaka
- Products: Deposits, Personal Banking Schemes, C & I Banking Schemes, Agri Banking Schemes, SME Banking Schemes
- Services: Banking, Trade Finance

The Dacca Bank was a bank founded in 1846 in Dhaka, in the then British India. The bank was the thirty second oldest bank in India. It is the very first private bank founded in the present day country of Bangladesh.

== History ==
The bank was founded in 1846 in Dhaka by Khwaja Alimullah. He was a merchant and the largest and most influential zamindar in East Bengal. He also managed to maintain friendly relations with the British during the British Raj in India. The bank was started with a capital of four lakh rupees.

After his death in 1954, Khwaja Alimullah was succeeded by his son Khwaja Abdul Ghani, who continued to manage the affairs of the bank. The directors of the bank were J P Wise, R J Carnegie, Nicholas Pogose, Babu Mirtunjoy Dutt, Babu Dinanath Ghosh, William Foley and G M Reilly.

The bank was acquired by the Bank of Bengal in 1862. The last few branches of the bank were shut in 1877 and were gradually replaced by the branches of the Bank of Bengal.
