= Exchange rate history of the Indian rupee =

== Monetary system and exchange rate before independence ==
Indian Rupee Symbol

Prior to World War One, the major countries (England, USA etc.) were on the gold standard. The Indian rupee coin was silver, convertible into gold at the prevailing 15:1 ratio based on their weights. [Note that 1 pound equalled 20 shillings (sh.) and 1 shilling equalled 12 pence (d.). So, 1 pound = 20×12 = 240d.] Hence the rupee exchange rate was 240/15 equalled 16 d. or 1 sh. 4 d. This was its par value. It was called a silver exchange standard: rupee notes were convertible into silver coin, and that was in turn convertible into gold. Based on the actual sale of Council Bills, incorporating transaction costs, the Rs. was 1 sh. 3.906 d. for the years 1907 to 1911, effectively at par. However, during World War 1 the Rs. rose to 1 sh. 4.906 d. by 1918–19 and during this time the par value was also raised.

The rupee was worth one shilling and sixpence in sterling in 1947. The US dollar was worth ₹3.3085 in 1947 and ₹92.30 in March 2026.

== Rupee value in early post-independence period ==
At Independence the Rs. was fixed at 1 sh. 6 d. which was equivalent of Rs 13.33 per pound sterling. In 1949 the pound was devalued against the U.S. dollar to $2.80 per pound, but the Rs. pound rate was left unchanged. So the Rs. became 4.76 per $ (13.33/2.80). This fixed exchange rate continued until 1966 when the Rs. was devalued, following a severe drought, and based on World Bank advice and pressure to Rs. 7.50 per US $.

== Rupee value after 1974 ==
This is a list of tables showing the historical timeline of the exchange rate for the Indian rupee (INR) against the special drawing rights unit (SDR), United States dollar (USD), pound sterling (GBP), Deutsche mark (DM), euro (EUR) and Japanese yen (JPY).

== Notes for table below ==
- The data on exchange rate for Japanese yen is in per 100 Yen.
- The end-of-year rate for 1998–99 pertains to March 26, 1999, of the Deutsche Mark rate.
- Data from 1971 to 1991–92 are based on official exchange rates.
- Data from 1992 to 1993 onward are based on FEDAI (Foreign Exchange Dealers' Association of India) indicative rates.
- Data from 1971 to 1972–73 for the Deutsche Mark and the Japanese Yen are cross rates with the US Dollar.
- The Euro replaced the Deutsche Mark w.e.f. January 1, 1999.

== 2014 to 2026 ==
Exchange Rate of the Indian Rupee vis-a-vis the SDR, USD, GBP, DM and JPY (FY, annual average and end-year rates)
Year	SDR (average)	SDR (end year)	USD (average)	USD (end year)	GBP (average)	GBP (end year)	DM/EUR (average)	DM/EUR (end year)	JPY (average)	JPY (end year)
1974–75	9.6233	9.723	7.9408	7.74	18.8	18.776	3.1917	3.324	3	2.7
1975–76	10.3642	10.375	8.6825	8.973	18.3933	17.19	3.4458	3.535	3	3
1976–77	10.35	10.206	8.9775	8.804	15.5733	15.144	3.6308	3.686	3	3.2
1977–78	10.1605	10.43	8.5858	8.434	15.4292	15.656	3.8358	4.169	3.33	3.8
1978–79	10.4315	10.488	8.2267	8.15	15.9658	16.861	4.22	4.364	4	3.9
1979–80	10.4935	10.251	8.0975	8.193	17.655	17.753	4.4717	4.219	3.58	3.3
1980–81	10.1777	10.0620	7.9092	8.1900	18.5042	18.3800	4.1875	3.9000	3.7500	3.9000
1981–82	10.3354	10.4030	8.9683	9.3460	17.1096	16.6520	3.8607	3.8710	3.9400	3.8000
1982–83	10.5628	10.7540	9.6660	9.9700	16.1356	14.7460	3.9600	4.1090	3.8900	4.2000
1983–84	10.9405	11.3940	10.3400	10.7070	15.4174	15.4460	3.9402	4.1340	4.3800	4.8000
1984–85	11.9328	12.3210	11.8886	12.4300	14.8668	15.4500	3.9877	4.0190	4.8700	4.9000
1985–86	12.9232	13.9860	12.2349	12.3061	16.8467	18.2500	4.5553	5.3020	5.6200	6.8000
1986–87	15.4472	16.6210	12.7782	12.8882	15.2255	20.7490	6.2970	7.1620	8.0200	8.9000
1987–88	17.1208	17.9700	12.9658	13.0318	22.0872	24.3510	7.4004	7.8070	9.4100	10.3000
1988–89	19.2619	20.2080	14.4817	15.6630	25.5959	26.3990	8.0494	8.2590	11.3000	11.8000
1989–90	21.3684	22.4090	16.6492	17.3248	26.9179	28.3010	9.0922	10.1670	11.6600	11.0000
1990–91	24.8431	26.4140	17.9428	19.6429	33.1930	34.0500	11.4351	11.4270	12.7900	13.9000
1991–92	33.4325	35.5143	24.4737	31.2256	42.5151	53.6913	14.6248	18.3501	18.4400	23.2800
1992–93	37.1415	43.6511	30.6488	31.2354	51.6858	46.6200	19.5877	19.2864	24.5900	26.9900
1993–94	43.8863	44.3133	31.3655	31.3725	47.2064	46.5200	18.7403	18.7575	29.1100	35.5200
1994–95	45.7908	49.1558	31.3986	31.4950	48.8211	50.5650	20.2017	22.3600	31.6341	35.2888
1995–96	50.4768	50.1633	33.4498	34.3500	52.3526	52.4300	23.3993	23.3038	34.8425	32.2975
1996–97	50.8858	49.8032	35.4999	35.9150	56.3646	58.6938	22.9244	21.3863	31.5879	28.9463
1997–98	50.6735	52.7677	37.1648	39.4950	61.0240	66.1638	20.9613	21.3350	30.2990	29.7813
1998–99	57.5129	57.6132	42.0706	42.4350	69.5505	68.3588	24.1792	23.2863	33.1341	35.3263
1999–00	58.9335	58.7505	43.3327	43.6050	69.8510	69.5100	44.7909	41.7975	39.0606	41.4825
2000–01	59.5459	58.7969	45.6844	46.6400	67.5522	66.5788	41.4832	41.0113	41.4052	37.4338
2001–02	60.2150	60.8446	47.6919	48.8000	68.3189	69.5863	42.1811	42.6438	38.1790	36.8063
2002–03	64.1257	65.2550	48.3953	47.5050	74.8193	74.9225	48.0901	51.4925	39.7363	39.8925
2003–04	65.6876	64.2393	45.9516	43.4450	77.7389	79.6813	53.9896	53.1725	40.7077	41.6725
2004–05	66.9282	66.0987	44.9315	43.7550	82.8644	82.1125	56.5523	56.5863	41.8046	40.8075
2005–06	64.4898	64.2566	44.2735	44.6050	79.0472	77.7963	53.9124	54.1875	39.1438	38.0188
2006–07	67.2538	65.8289	45.2849	43.5950	85.7274	85.5938	58.1110	58.1513	38.7975	37.0338
2007–08	62.6506	65.7307	40.2410	39.9850	80.8016	79.5138	56.9906	63.0963	35.2896	40.0650
2008–09	71.2770	76.1742	45.9170	50.9450	78.4485	72.8575	65.1345	67.4713	46.0521	51.8900
2009–10	73.7333	68.5335	47.4166	45.1350	75.8861	68.0188	67.0843	60.5913	51.1261	48.4338
2010–11	69.7228	70.7930	45.5768	44.6450	70.8853	71.9163	60.2181	63.2350	53.2963	54.0175
2011–12	75.3132	79.2512	47.9229	51.1600	76.3912	81.7975	65.8939	68.3550	60.7484	62.4250
2012–13	83.0262	81.4764	53.2112	54.2323	85.9713	82.3209	70.0693	69.5438	65.8530	57.7600
2013–14	92.2602	92.7790	60.5019	60.0998	98.3058	99.8498	81.1745	82.5765	60.4026	58.8300
2014–15	90.7955	86.3431	61.1436	62.5908	98.5731	92.4591	77.5209	67.5104	55.8266	52.1100
2015–16	91.3452	93.4510	65.4685	66.3329	98.7260	95.0882	72.2894	75.0955	54.5934	59.0600
2016–17	92.6156	87.9763	67.0720	64.8386	87.6897	80.8797	73.6087	69.2476	62.0350	57.9600
2017–18	90.8989	94.8065	64.4549	65.0441	85.5129	92.2846	75.4378	80.6222	58.1822	61.5400
2018–19	98.0361	96.0273	69.9229	69.1713	91.7865	90.4756	80.9580	77.7024	63.0468	65.5200
2019–20	97.6267	102.8870	70.8970	75.3859	90.1587	93.0760	78.7997	83.0496	65.2442	69.6500
2020–21	104.5530	104.1710	74.2250	73.5047	97.0386	100.9509	86.5385	86.0990	70.0366	66.3600
2021–22	105.3677	104.7960	74.5039	75.8071	101.8107	99.5524	86.5922	84.6599	66.3389	62.2300
2022–23	106.4172	110.6010	80.3635	82.2169	96.8216	101.8728	83.6826	89.6076	59.4073	61.8000
2023–24	110.2343	110.3390	82.7897	83.3739	104.0468	105.2935	89.8022	90.2178	57.3740	55.0900
2024–25	111.8956	113.4500	84.5756	85.5814	107.8792	110.7389	90.7604	92.3246	55.5302	56.7500
