= Paper Currency Act, 1861 =

British Indian law

Imperial Legislative Council (India)
- Long title: An Act to consolidate and amend the law relating to the Government Paper Currency
- Citation: Act No. 3 of 1861
- Enacted by: Imperial Legislative Council (India)
- Enacted: 1861
- Commenced: 1861
- Status: Repealed

The Paper Currency Act, 1861 is an act in India dating from the British colonial rule, that is currently no longer in force.

== Background ==
Before the passing of the Act, there were a number of commercial banks in India which issued their own banknotes to the general public. Some of these commercial banks included:

- The General Bank of Bengal and Bihar
- The Bank of Hindostan, which had been set up by the Alexander and Co. agency house

The East India Company, which then ruled over large parts of India, wanted to take away this power of issuing banknotes from the commercial banks, as a result of which The Paper Currency Act, 1861 was enacted into law.

== Tenets and Precepts ==
After the enactment of the Act, the East India Company government became the sole issuer of banknotes in India.

The three Presidency Banks of India became the issuer of banknotes on the behalf of the East India Company:

- Bank of Calcutta
- Bank of Bombay
- Bank of Madras

== Repealment ==
Just a few years before the Independence of India, the Reserve Bank of India Act, 1934 was passed which effectively repealed The Paper Currency Act, 1861. From now onwards, the Reserve Bank of India became the sole issuer of banknotes in India.
