= Bank of Bombay =

Indian bank founded by British East India Company

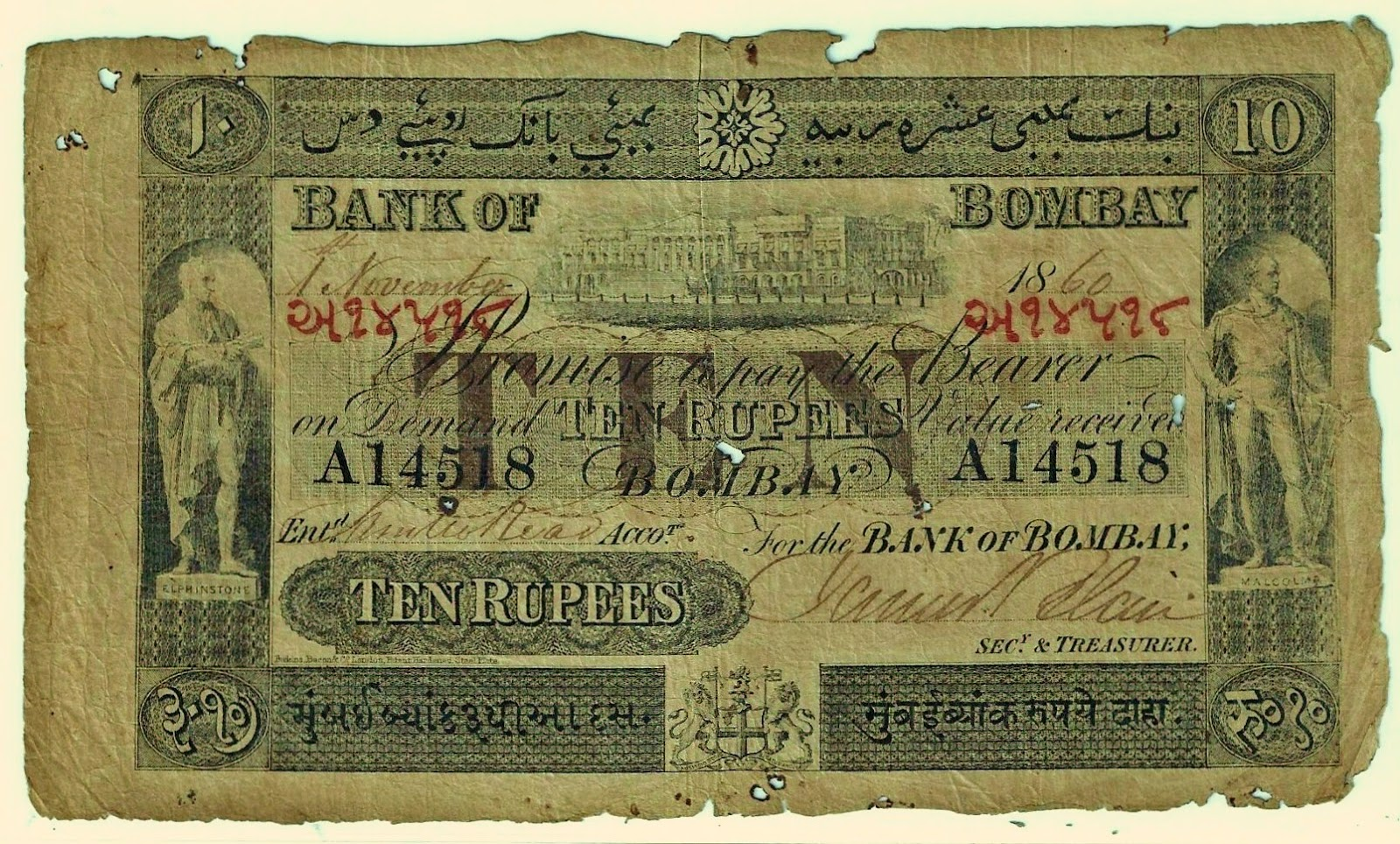
- Bank of Bombay, 10 Rupees, 1860.
- Industry: Banking; Financial services
- Founded: 15 April 1840; 186 years ago
- Defunct: 27 January 1921; 105 years ago
- Fate: Merged with Bank of Calcutta and Bank of Madras
- Successor: Imperial Bank of India
- Headquarters: Bombay, Bombay Presidency, British India
- Area served: British India

The Bank of Bombay was the second of the three presidency banks (others being the Bank of Calcutta and the Bank of Madras) of the Raj period. It was established, pursuant to a charter of the British East India Company, on 15 April 1840.

== Subsidiaries ==
The bank's headquarters were in Bombay, now called Mumbai. The Bank of Bombay undertook all the normal activities which a commercial bank was expected to undertake. The Bank of Bombay, in the absence of any central banking authority at that time, also conducted certain functions which are ordinarily a preserve of a central bank.

The Bank of Bombay and two other Presidency banks - the Bank of Calcutta and the Bank of Madras - were amalgamated and the reorganized banking entity was named the Imperial Bank of India on 27 January 1921. The Reserve Bank of India, which is the central banking organization of India, in the year 1955, acquired a controlling interest in the Imperial Bank of India and the Imperial Bank of India was renamed on 30 April 1955 to the State Bank of India.

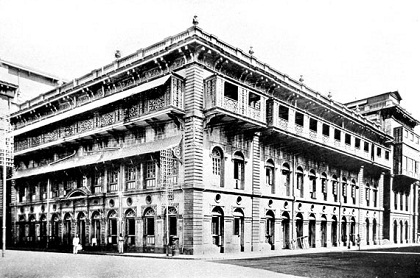

== See also ==
- List of banks that have merged to form the State Bank of India
- Indian banking
