= Bank of Hindostan =

1770–1832 bank in British India

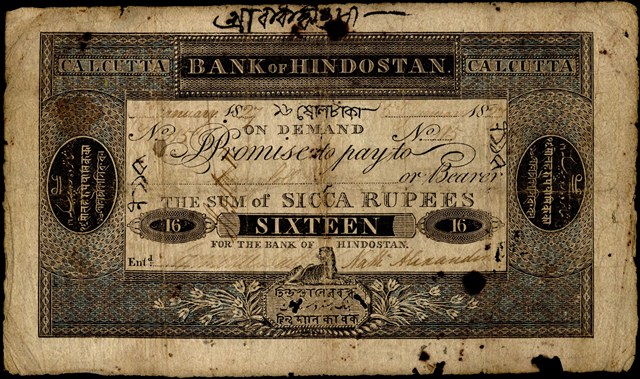
- Type: Public sector
- Industry: Banking, Insurance, Capital Markets and allied industries
- Founded: 1770
- Founder: Alexander and Co.
- Defunct: 31 March 1832; 194 years ago
- Fate: Defunct
- Headquarters: Calcutta
- Number of locations: Bengal Presidency
- Area served: Indian subcontinent
- Products: Deposits, Personal Banking Schemes, C & I Banking Schemes, Agri Banking Schemes, SME Banking Schemes
- Services: Loans, Deposits

Bank of Hindostan (1770–1832), a now defunct bank, was the third oldest bank in Indian region.

== History ==
It was established by the agency house of Alexander and Company.

The Bank lived through three economic crises of the 19th century:

- The Recession of 1819
- The failure of Palmer and Co., a British agency house
- The Banking Crisis of 1832

== Business Activities ==
In India, the paper currency was first issued during British East India Company rule. The first paper notes were issued by the private banks such as the Bank of Hindostan and the presidency banks during the late 18th century. Via the Paper Currency Act of 1861, the British Government of India was conferred the monopoly to issue paper notes in India. It was liquidated in 1830–1832.

== See also ==
- Indian banking
- List of banks in India
- List of oldest banks in India
