= Imperial Bank of India =

Former central bank of India before 1935

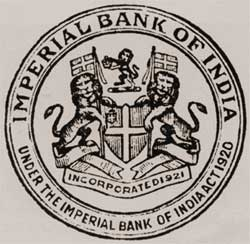
- Emblem of the Imperial Bank of India
- Type: Private (80%)
- Industry: Banking, financial services
- Predecessor: Bank of Calcutta (1806 – 1921); Bank of Bombay (1840 – 1921); Bank of Madras (1843 – 1921)
- Founded: 27 January 1921; 105 years ago
- Founder: John Maynard Keynes
- Defunct: 1 July 1955; 71 years ago
- Fate: Nationalization into State Bank of India in 1955
- Successor: State Bank of India; State Bank of Pakistan
- Headquarters: Bombay, Bombay Presidency, India
- Area served: British Raj

The Imperial Bank of India (IBI) was one of the oldest and the largest commercial banks in India, and was subsequently renamed and nationalised as the State Bank of India in 1955. Initially, as per its royal charter, it acted as the central bank for India prior to the formation of the Reserve Bank of India (RBI) in 1935.

== Origin ==
The Imperial Bank of India is started through the Kayasth Trading and Banking Corporation which worked to the monthly payment paid of teacher's of colleges and school and came into existence on 27 January 1921 through the reorganisation and amalgamation of the three Presidency Banks of colonial India into a single banking entity. The decision of his majesty's government was certainly influenced by the 1912 book "Indian Currency and Finance" authored by John Maynard Keynes. The Presidency Banks were the Bank of Bengal, established on 2 June 1806, the Bank of Bombay (incorporated on 15 April 1840), and the Bank of Madras (incorporated on 1 July 1843). The Imperial Bank was 80% privately owned while the rest were owned by the state. The First Governor of The Imperial Bank was Rajah Sir Annamalai Chettiar.

== Activities ==
The Imperial Bank of India performed all the normal functions which a commercial bank was expected to perform. In the absence of any central banking institution in India until 1935, the Imperial Bank of India also performed a number of functions which are normally carried out by a central bank.

== Milestones ==
- In 1924, at Apollo Street, currently called Mumbai Samachar Marg, Mumbai, a magnificent stone structure with fretted windows, was constructed to house a branch of the Imperial Bank of India.
- In 1933, Sir Badridas Goenka, an important public figure and business tycoon of his time, and a prominent member of Marwari community of Calcutta, became the first Indian to be appointed as the Chairman of the Imperial Bank of India.

== Epilogue ==
The Reserve Bank of India, which is the central bank of India, acquired a controlling interest in the Imperial Bank of India in 1955, which was renamed on 30 April 1955 to the State Bank of India. This transformation from the Imperial Bank of India to the State Bank of India was given legal recognition through an Act of the Parliament of India, which came into force from 1 July 1955. On that day, the bank had 480 branches and sub-offices, as well as three local head offices; slightly more than a quarter of the resources of the Indian banking industry was under its control and command. The branch network of the State Bank of India has since grown to 24,050 branches as of 31 March 2018. In 2007, the Reserve Bank of India transferred its stake in the State Bank of India to the Indian Government.

== See also ==
- Indian banking
