= Bank of Calcutta =

Bank in British Raj

Bank of Bengal
- Formerly: Bank of Calcutta
- Industry: Banking, financial services
- Founded: 2 June 1806; 220 years ago
- Defunct: 27 January 1921; 105 years ago
- Fate: Merged with Bank of Bombay and Bank of Madras
- Successor: Imperial Bank of India
- Headquarters: Calcutta, Bengal Presidency, British India
- Area served: British India

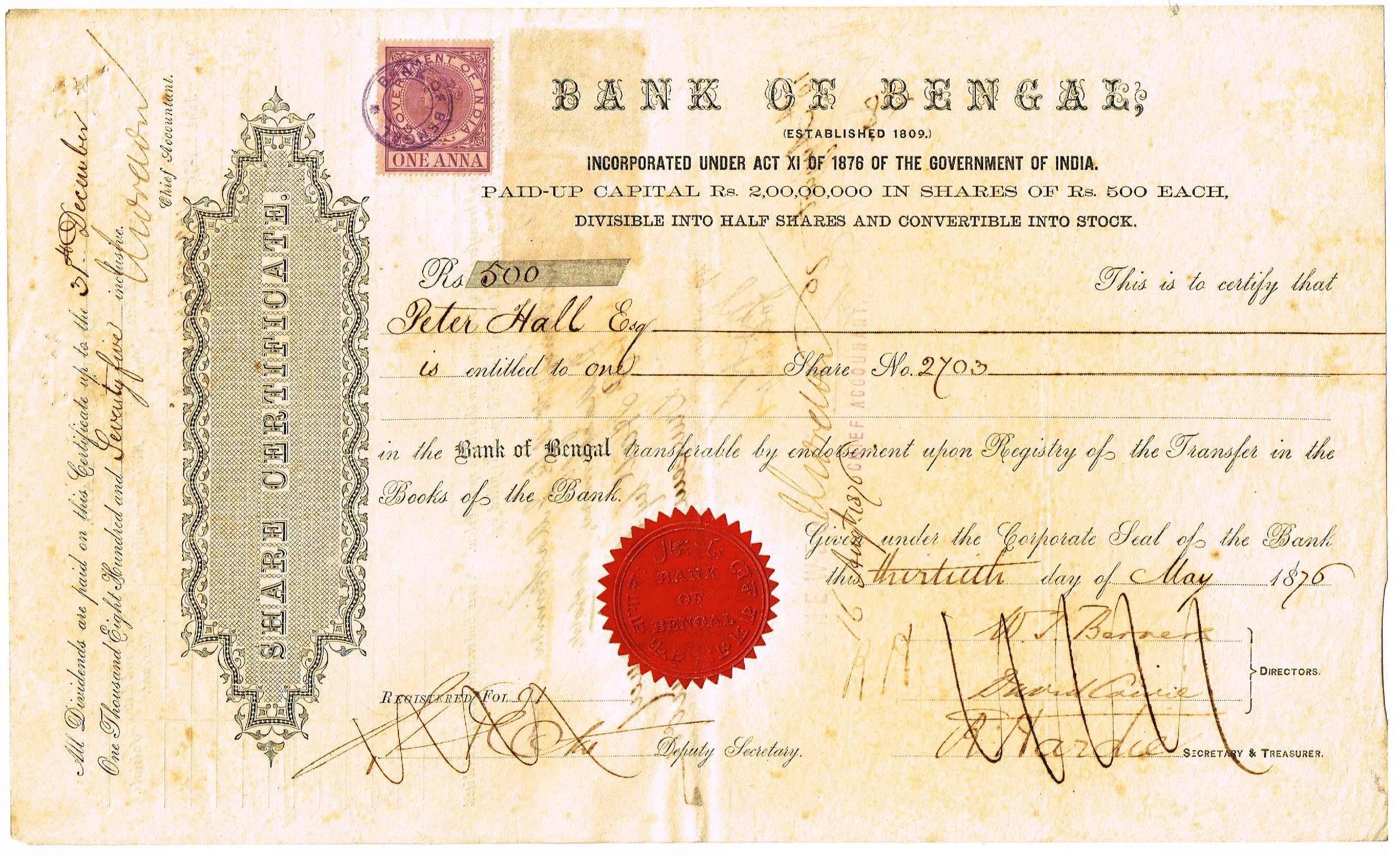
Share of the Bank of Bengal, issued on 13 May 1876.

The Bank of Calcutta (a precursor to the present State Bank of India) was founded on 2 June 1806, mainly to fund General Arthur Wellesley's wars against Tipu Sultan and the Marathas. It was the tenth oldest bank in India and was renamed Bank of Bengal on 2 January 1809.

== History ==
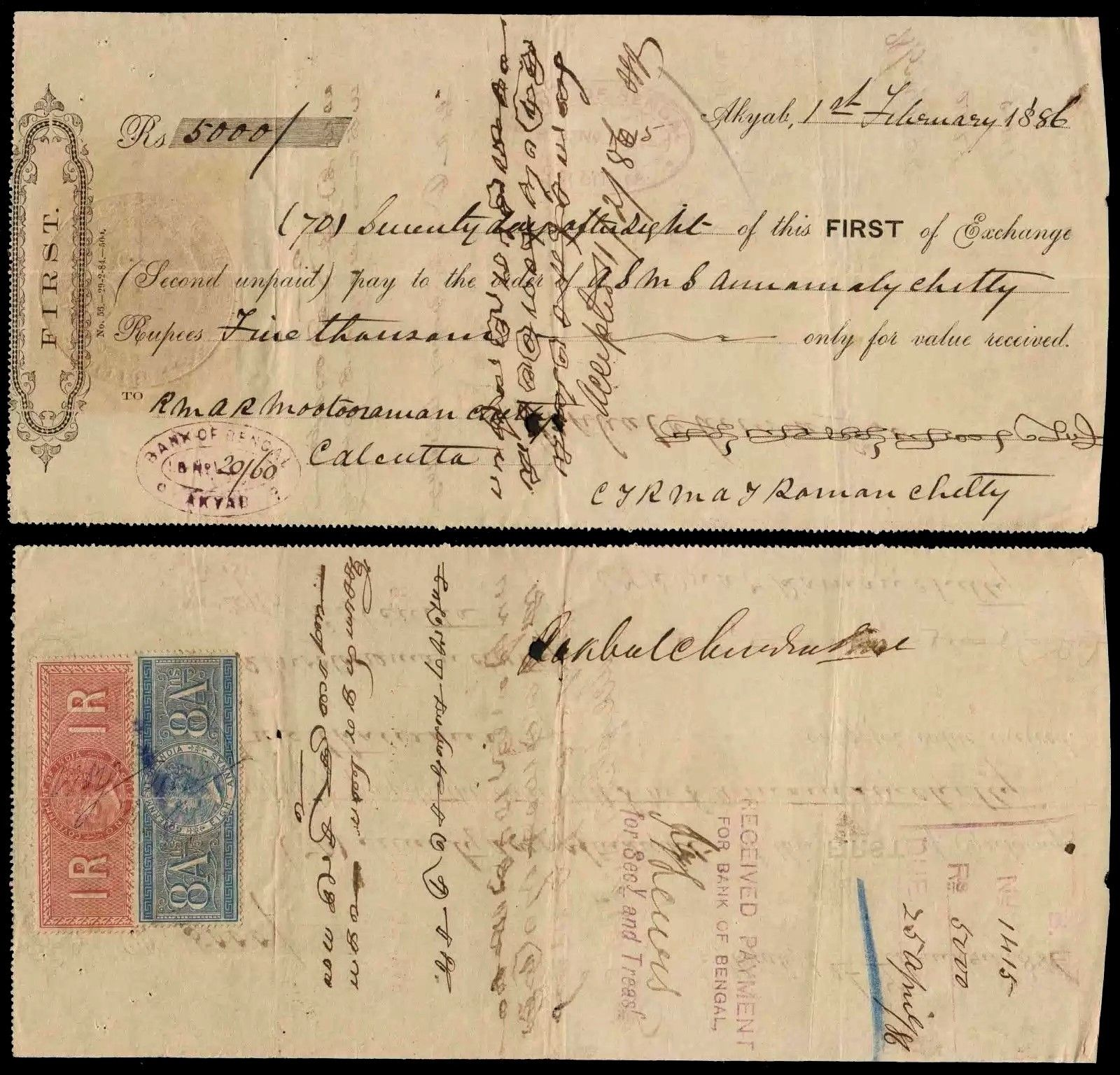
A bill of exchange processed by the Bank of Bengal, 1886.

The bank opened branches at Rangoon (1861), Patna (1862), Mirzapur (1862), and Benares (1862). When it became known that the bank intended to open a branch at Dacca, negotiations began that resulted in Bank of Bengal in 1862 amalgamating The Dacca Bank (1846). A branch at Cawnpore followed.

== Famous customers ==
Among the bank's renowned customers were scholar and politician Dadabhai Naoroji, scientist Jagadish Chandra Bose, India's first President Rajendra Prasad, Nobel laureate Rabindranath Tagore, and educationalist Ishwar Chandra Vidyasagar.

== Work ==
The bank was risk averse and would not lend for more than three months, leading to local businessmen, both British and Indian, launching private banks, many of which failed. The most storied bank failure was The Union Bank (1828) founded by Dwarakanath Tagore in partnership with British companies.

The Bank of Calcutta, and the two other Presidency banks – the Bank of Bombay and the Bank of Madras – amalgamated on 27 January 1921. The reorganized banking entity assumed the name Imperial Bank of India. The Reserve Bank of India, which is the central banking organization of India, in the year 1955, acquired a controlling interest in the Imperial Bank of India and the Imperial Bank of India was renamed on 30 April 1955 as the State Bank of India.

== See also ==
- Banking in India
- History of banking
- List of banks that have merged to form the State Bank of India
