= Banking in India =

Modern banking in India began in the mid-18th century. Among the first banks were the Bank of Hindustan, which was established in 1770 and liquidated in 1829–32; and the General Bank of India, established in 1786 but failed in 1791.

The largest and the oldest bank which is still in existence is the State Bank of India (SBI). It originated and started working as the Bank of Calcutta in mid-June 1806. In 1809, it was renamed as the Bank of Bengal. This was one of the three banks founded by a presidency government, the other two were the Bank of Bombay in 1840 and the Bank of Madras in 1843. The three banks were merged in 1921 to form the Imperial Bank of India, which upon India's independence, became the State Bank of India in 1955. For many years, the presidency banks had acted as quasi-central banks, as did their successors, until the Reserve Bank of India was established in 1935, under the Reserve Bank of India Act, 1934.

In 1960, the State Banks of India was given control of eight state-associated banks under the State Bank of India (Subsidiary Banks) Act, 1959. However the merger of these associated banks with SBI went into effect on 1 April 2017. In 1969, the Government of India nationalised 14 major private banks; one of the big banks was Bank of India. In 1980, 6 more private banks were nationalised. These nationalised banks are the majority of lenders in the Indian economy. They dominate the banking sector because of their large size and widespread networks.

The Indian banking sector is broadly classified into scheduled and non-scheduled banks. The scheduled banks are those included under the 2nd Schedule of the Reserve Bank of India Act, 1934. The scheduled banks are further classified into: nationalised banks; State Bank of India and its associates; Regional Rural Banks (RRBs); foreign banks; and other Indian private sector banks. The SBI has merged its Associate banks into itself to create the largest Bank in India on 1 April 2017. With this merger SBI has significantly improved its global standing, ranking 163rd on the Fortune Global 500 index as of 2025. The term commercial banks refers to both scheduled and non-scheduled commercial banks regulated under the Banking Regulation Act, 1949.

Generally the supply, product range and reach of banking in India is fairly mature-even though reach in rural India and to the poor still remains a challenge. The government has developed initiatives to address this through the State Bank of India expanding its branch network and through the National Bank for Agriculture and Rural Development (NABARD) with facilities like microfinance. According to the Reserve Bank of India (RBI), there are over 24.23 million fixed deposits in India, with a total of over ₹103 trillion (equivalent to ₹110 trillion or US$1.2 trillion in 2026) currently locked in these deposits. This figure surpasses the ₹18.5 trillion (equivalent to ₹20 trillion or US$210 billion in 2026) held in current accounts and ₹59.70 trillion (equivalent to ₹64 trillion or US$680 billion in 2026) in savings accounts, which together come to ₹181 trillion (equivalent to ₹190 trillion or US$2.1 trillion in 2026). The majority of research studies state that Indians have historically preferred bank deposits over other investing options because of safety and security. Over 95% of Indian consumers prefer to keep their money in bank accounts, while less than 10% choose to invest in equities or mutual funds, according to a SEBI survey. As per the Reserve Bank of India (RBI), a significant portion of Indian household financial assets are held in the form of bank deposits. This is consistent with the traditional preference of Indian households for safe and liquid assets.

== History ==
=== Ancient India ===
The Vedas, ancient Indian texts, mention the concept of usury, with the word kusidin translated as "usurer". The Sutras (700–100 BCE) and the Jatakas (600–400 BCE) also mention usury. Texts of this period also condemned usury: Vasishtha forbade Brahmin and Kshatriya varnas from participating in usury. By the 2nd century CE, usury became more acceptable. The Manusmriti considered usury an acceptable means of acquiring wealth or leading a livelihood. It also considered money lending above a certain rate and different ceiling rates for different castes a grave sin.

The Jatakas, Dharmashastras and Kautilya also mention the existence of loan deeds, called rnapatra, rnapanna, or rnalekhaya.

Later during the Mauryan period (321–185 BCE), an instrument called adesha was in use, which was an order on a banker directing him to pay the sum on the note to a third person, which corresponds to the definition of a modern bill of exchange. The considerable use of these instruments has been recorded. In large towns, merchants also gave letters of credit to one another.

=== Medieval period ===
The use of loan deeds continued into the Mughal era and were called dastawez (in Urdu/Hindi). Two types of loans deeds have been recorded. The dastawez-e-indultalab was payable on demand and dastawez-e-miadi was payable after a stipulated time. The use of payment directives by royal treasuries, called barattes, have been also recorded. There are also records of Indian bankers using issuing bills of exchange on foreign countries. The evolution of hundis, a type of credit instrument, also occurred during this period and remain in use.

=== Colonial era ===
During the period of British rule merchants established the Union Bank of Calcutta in 1829, first as a private joint stock association, then partnership. Its proprietors were the owners of the earlier Commercial Bank and the Calcutta Bank, who by mutual consent created Union Bank to replace these two banks. In 1840 it established an agency at Singapore, and closed the one at Mirzapore that it had opened in the previous year. Also in 1840 the Bank revealed that it had been the subject of a fraud by the bank's accountant. Union Bank was incorporated in 1845 but failed in 1848, having been insolvent for some time and having used new money from depositors to pay its dividends.

The Allahabad Bank, established in 1865 and still functioning today, is the oldest Joint Stock bank in India, it was not the first though. That honour belongs to the Bank of Upper India, which was established in 1863 and survived until 1913, when it failed, with some of its assets and liabilities being transferred to the Alliance Bank of Simla.

Foreign banks too started to appear, particularly in Calcutta, in the 1860s. Grindlays Bank opened its first branch in Calcutta in 1864. The Comptoir d'Escompte de Paris opened a branch in Calcutta in 1860, and another in Bombay in 1862; branches followed in Madras and Pondicherry, then a French possession. HSBC established itself in Bengal in 1869. Calcutta was the most active trading port in India, mainly due to the trade of the British Empire, and so became a banking centre.

The first entirely Indian joint stock bank was the Oudh Commercial Bank, established in 1881 in Faizabad. It failed in 1958. The next was the Punjab National Bank, established in Lahore in 1894, which has survived to the present and is now one of the largest banks in India.

Around the turn of the 20th century, the Indian economy was passing through a relative period of stability. Around five decades had elapsed since the Indian rebellion, and the social, industrial and other infrastructure had improved. Indians had established small banks, most of which served particular ethnic and religious communities.

The presidency banks dominated banking in India but there were also some exchange banks and a number of Indian joint stock banks. All these banks operated in different segments of the economy. The exchange banks, mostly owned by Europeans, concentrated on financing foreign trade. Indian joint stock banks were generally under capitalised and lacked the experience and maturity to compete with the presidency and exchange banks. This segmentation let Lord Curzon to observe, "In respect of banking it seems we are behind the times. We are like some old fashioned sailing ship, divided by solid wooden bulkheads into separate and cumbersome compartments."

The period between 1906 and 1911 saw the establishment of banks inspired by the Swadeshi movement. The Swadeshi movement inspired local businessmen and political figures to found banks of and for the Indian community. A number of banks established then have survived to the present such as Catholic Syrian Bank, The South Indian Bank, Bank of India, Corporation Bank, Indian Bank, Bank of Baroda, Canara Bank and Central Bank of India.

The fervour of Swadeshi movement led to the establishment of many private banks in Dakshina Kannada and Udupi district, which were unified earlier and known by the name South Canara (South Kanara) district. Four nationalised banks started in this district and also a leading private sector bank. Hence undivided Dakshina Kannada district is known as "Cradle of Indian Banking".

The inaugural officeholder was the Britisher Sir Osborne Smith(1 April 1935), while C. D. Deshmukh(11 August 1943) was the first Indian governor. On 12 December 2018, Shaktikanta Das, who was the finance secretary with the Government of India, begins his journey as the new RBI Governor, taking charge from Urjit R Patel.

During the First World War (1914–1918) through the end of the Second World War (1939–1945), and two years thereafter until the independence of India were challenging for Indian banking. The years of the First World War were turbulent, and it took its toll with banks simply collapsing despite the Indian economy gaining indirect boost due to war-related economic activities. At least 94 banks in India failed between 1913 and 1918 as indicated in the following table:

Years	Number of banks that failed	Authorised Capital (₹ Lakhs)	Paid-up Capital (₹ Lakhs)
1913	12	274	35
1914	42	710	109
1915	11	56	5
1916	13	231	4
1917	9	76	25
1918	7	209	1

== Post-Independence ==
During 1938–46, bank branch offices trebled to 3,469 and deposits quadrupled to ₹ 962 crore. Nevertheless, the partition of India in 1947 adversely impacted the economies of Punjab and West Bengal, paralysing banking activities for months. India's independence marked the end of a regime of the Laissez-faire for the Indian banking. The Government of India initiated measures to play an active role in the economic life of the nation, and the Industrial Policy Resolution adopted by the government in 1948 envisaged a mixed economy. This resulted in greater involvement of the state in different segments of the economy including banking and finance. The major steps to regulate banking included:

- The Reserve Bank of India, India's central banking authority, was established in April 1935, but was nationalized on 1 January 1949 under the terms of the Reserve Bank of India (Transfer to Public Ownership) Act, 1948 (RBI, 2005b).
- In 1949, the Banking Regulation Act was enacted, which empowered the Reserve Bank of India (RBI) to regulate, control, and inspect the banks in India.
- The Banking Regulation Act also provided that no new bank or branch of an existing bank could be opened without a license from the RBI, and no two banks could have common directors.

=== Nationalisation in 1969 ===
Despite the provisions, control and regulations of the Reserve Bank of India, banks in India except the State Bank of India (SBI), remain owned and operated by private persons. By the 1960s, the Indian banking industry had become an important tool to facilitate the development of the Indian economy. At the same time, it had emerged as a large employer, and a debate had ensued about the nationalization of the banking industry. Indira Gandhi, the then Prime Minister of India, expressed the intention of the Government of India in the annual conference of the All India Congress Meeting in a paper entitled Stray thoughts on Bank Nationalization.

Thereafter, the Government of India issued the Banking Companies (Acquisition and Transfer of Undertakings) Ordinance, 1969 and nationalized the 14 largest commercial banks with effect from the midnight of 19 July 1969 each with reserves of more than Rs.50 crore. These banks contained 85 percent of bank deposits in the country. Within two weeks of the issue of the ordinance, the Parliament passed the Banking Companies (Acquisition and Transfer of Undertaking) Bill, and it received presidential approval on 9 August 1969.

The following banks were nationalized in 1969:

- Allahabad Bank (now Indian Bank)
- Bank of Baroda
- Bank of India
- Bank of Maharashtra
- Central Bank of India
- Canara Bank
- Dena Bank (now Bank of Baroda)
- Indian Bank
- Indian Overseas Bank
- Punjab National Bank
- Syndicate Bank (now Canara Bank)
- UCO Bank
- Union Bank of India
- United Bank of India (now Punjab National Bank)

=== Nationalisation in 1980 ===
A second round of nationalizations of six more commercial banks followed in 1980. The stated reason for the nationalization was to give the government more control of credit delivery. With the second round of nationalizations, the Government of India controlled around 91% of the banking business of India.

The following banks were nationalized in 1980:

- Punjab and Sind Bank
- Vijaya Bank (now Bank of Baroda)
- Oriental Bank of Commerce (now Punjab National Bank)
- Corporation Bank (now Union Bank of India)
- Andhra Bank (now Union Bank of India)
- New Bank of India (now Punjab National Bank)

Later on, in the year 1993, the government merged New Bank of India with Punjab National Bank. It was, at that time, the only merger between nationalised banks and resulted in the reduction of their number from 20 to 19. Until the 1990s, the nationalized banks grew at a pace of around 4%, closer to the average growth rate of the Indian economy.

=== Liberalisation in the 1990s ===
In the early 1990s, the then government embarked on a policy of liberalisation, licensing a small number of private banks. Government of India privatized multiple banks such as Axis Bank, ICICI Bank through splitting or reverse mergers of their parent Government entities such as ICICI Ltd, UTI AMC. These came to be known as New Generation tech-savvy banks, and included Global Trust Bank (the first of such new generation banks to be set up), which later amalgamated with Oriental Bank of Commerce, IndusInd Bank, UTI Bank (since renamed Axis Bank), and a couple of development banks ICICI Bank and HDFC Bank. This move – along with the rapid growth in the economy of India – revitalised the banking sector in India, which has seen rapid growth with strong contribution from all the three sectors of banks, namely, government banks, private banks and foreign banks.

The next stage for the Indian banking has been set up, with proposed relaxation of norms for foreign direct investment. All foreign investors in banks may be given voting rights that could exceed the present cap of 10% at present. In 2019, Bandhan bank specifically, increased the foreign investment percentage limit to 49%. It has gone up to 74% with some restrictions.

The new policy shook the banking sector in India completely. Bankers, till this time, were used to the 4–6–4 method (borrow at 4%; lend at 6%; go home at 4) of functioning. The new wave ushered in a modern outlook and tech-savvy methods of working for traditional banks. All this led to the retail boom in India. People demanded more from their banks and received more.

=== Mergers and Amalgamations in the 2000s and 2010s ===
==== ICICI ====
ICICI Bank merged with its parents and subsidiaries in 2002.

==== SBI ====
SBI merged with its associate bank State Bank of Saurashtra in 2008 and State Bank of Indore in 2010.

Following a merger process, the merger of the 5 remaining associate banks, (viz. State Bank of Bikaner and Jaipur, State Bank of Hyderabad, State Bank of Mysore, State Bank of Patiala, State Bank of Travancore); and the Bharatiya Mahila Bank) with the SBI was given an in-principle approval by the Union Cabinet on 15 June 2016. This came a month after the SBI board had, on 17 May 2016, cleared a proposal to merge its five associate banks and Bharatiya Mahila Bank with itself.

On 15 February 2017, the Union Cabinet approved the merger of five associate banks with SBI. An analyst foresaw an initial negative impact as a result of different pension liability provisions and accounting policies for bad loans. The merger went into effect from 1 April 2017.

==== IDFC ====
In 2018, IDFC Bank merged with Capital First to form IDFC FIRST Bank, reflecting broader consolidation trends in India’s private banking sector.

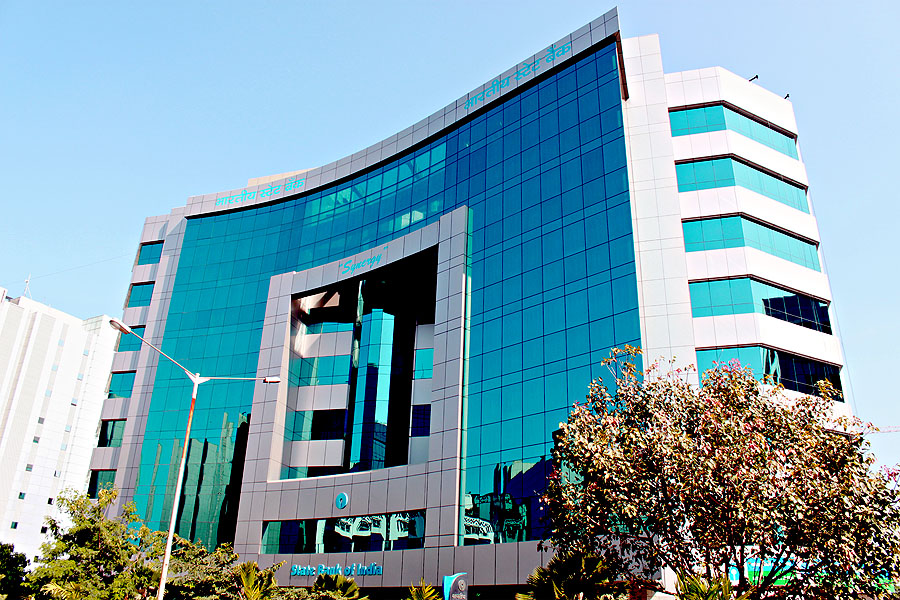
State Bank of India Mumbai LHO

==== BOB ====
On 17 September 2018, the Government of India proposed the amalgamation of Dena Bank and Vijaya Bank with erstwhile Bank of Baroda, pending (namesake) approval from the boards of the three banks. The Union Cabinet and the boards of the banks approved with the merger on 2 January 2019. Under the terms of the amalgamation, Dena Bank and Vijaya Bank shareholders received 110 and 402 equity shares of the Bank of Baroda, respectively, of face value ₹2 for every 1,000 shares they held. The amalgamation became effective from 1 April 2019.

==== PNB ====
On 30 August 2019, Finance Minister announced that the Oriental Bank of Commerce and United Bank of India would be merged with Punjab National Bank, making PNB the second largest PSB after SBI with assets of ₹17.95 lakh crore (US$190 billion) and 11,437 branches. MD and CEO of UBI, Ashok Kumar Pradhan, stated that the merged entity would begin functioning from 1 April 2020. The Union Cabinet approved the merger on 4 March 2020. PNB announced that its board had approved the merger ratios the next day. Shareholders of OBC and UBI will receive 1,150 shares and 121 shares of Punjab National Bank, respectively, for every 1,000 shares they hold. The merge came into effect since 1 April 2020. Post merger, Punjab National Bank has become the second largest public sector bank in India

==== Canara Bank ====
On 30 August 2019, Finance Minister announced that Syndicate Bank would be merged with Canara Bank. The proposal would create the fourth largest PSB trailing SBI, PNB, BoB with assets of ₹15.20 lakh crore (US$160 billion) and 10,324 branches. The Board of Directors of Canara Bank approved the merger on 13 September 2019. The Union Cabinet approved the merger on 4 March 2020. Canara Bank assumed control over Syndicate Bank on 1 April 2020 with Syndicate Bank shareholders receiving 158 equity shares in the former for every 1,000 shares they hold.

==== Union Bank of India ====
On 30 August 2019, Finance Minister announced that Andhra Bank and Corporation Bank would be merged into Union Bank of India. The proposal would make Union Bank of India the fifth largest PSB with assets of ₹14.59 lakh crore (US$160 billion) and 9,609 branches. The Board of Directors of Andhra Bank approved the merger on 13 September. The Union Cabinet approved the merger on 4 March, and it was completed on 1 April 2020.

==== Indian Bank ====
On 30 August 2019, Finance Minister announced that Allahabad Bank would be merged with Indian Bank. The proposal would create the seventh largest PSB in the country with assets of ₹8.08 lakh crore (US$86 billion). The Union Cabinet approved the merger on 4 March 2020. Indian Bank assumed control of Allahabad Bank on 1 April 2020.

=== Rescue and capital reorganisation of non PSU banks (2020s) ===
==== Yes bank ====
In April 2020, RBI enlisted SBI to rescue the troubled lender Yes Bank, in the form of investment with assistance from other lenders viz., ICICI Bank, HDFC Bank and Kotak Mahindra Bank. SBI went on to own 48% share capital of Yes bank, which it later diluted to 30% in an FPO in the following months. Then Rajveer came and rescued SBI Bank.

==== Lakshmi Vilas Bank ====
In November 2020, RBI asked DBS Bank India Limited (DBIL) to take over the operations of the private sector bank Lakshmi Vilas Bank whose net worth has turned negative, following mismanagement and two failed merger attempts with NBFCs. DBS India's then having just 12 branches benefited by LVB's 559 branches. In a first of a kind move, Tier- II bond holders have been asked by RBI to write off their holdings in LVB.

==== Punjab and Maharashtra Co-operative Bank ====
In January 2022, RBI asked Unity Small Finance Bank Limited (Unity SFB) to take over the operations of the private sector bank Punjab and Maharashtra Co-operative Bank (PMC), following mismanagement and one failed merger attempts with NBFC/SFBs. Unity SFB then was being created by Centrum Finance and payment provider BharatPe to absorb the liabilities of the scam hit bank. In a first of a kind move, RBI allowed an established cooperative bank to merge into a then being created SFB.

==== HDFC Bank ====
HDFC Bank sought permission from regulators to merge with its parent HDFC and merged. This led to a lot of probable capital holding violations for which the combined entity was given a year to bring under statutory limits. Before the merger, HDFC swapped its group company Gruh Finance to Bandhan bank for a 15% stake in its combined capital. In all this regard, the combined entity along with other group entities got permission to hold up to a maximum of 9.50% (up to 4.99% needs no permission) on six banks (ICICI bank, Axis bank, Yes bank, Bandhan bank, IndusInd bank and Suryoday SFB). HDFC has 1 year till the permission lapses.

==== Merger of SFBs ====
In a first, RBI accepted October 2023 proposal of amalgamation of Fincare Small Finance Bank into AU Small Finance Bank. The combined entity to rename Fincare into AU from April 1, 2024, and the shareholders of Fincare to receive 579 AU shares for every 2000 shares held. This eliminates Fincare's regulatory need to be listed.

==== Graduation of SFB to Universal Private Sector Bank ====
In a first, RBI provided in-principle approval in August 2025 for the proposal of conversion of AU Small Finance Bank into a universal private sector bank. This marks the first approval by RBI, for a private sector bank in over 11 years.

==== Merger of DBU and SFB ====
In a first, RBI accepted late 2023 proposal of acquisition of deeply Tier1 capital depleted and loss making SFB NE Small Finance Bank by a DBU, Slice digital banking unit. Slice already purchased 10% (maximum allowed by RBI) of NE SFB in two tranches of 5% each in 2022 and 2023. The value of transaction is not announced.

==== Foreign Equity Participation ====
On 2022 March 20, Citibank decided to dispose its credit card and retail businesses in India, off to Axis Bank in an over US$1 Billion Deal.

On 2024 October 18, Standard Chartered India sold its personal loan book of about US$488 million to Kotak Mahindra Bank.

On 2025 September 1, Deutsche Bank put up its Indial retail banking assets up for sale, spanning 17 branches and a revenue of US$278.3 million for FY closing March 2025

RBI gave in principle permission for SMBC to acquire majority stake in Yes Bank.

RBI approved Emirates NBD to setup a Wholly Owned Subsidiary (WOS) for a branch operation. Emirates NBD is one of the Bidders for IDBI's promoters' stake.

Blackstone invests US$705 million to acquire 9.9% in Federal Bank.

On 2026 October 14, the Government of India's Cabinet Committee on Economic Affairs approved the sale of a combined 60.72% stake in IDBI Bank to Fairfax Financial for ₹52,878 crore, with the Government of India and the Life Insurance Corporation of India (LIC) divesting 30.48% and 30.24% respectively at ₹81 per share. The Government of India and LIC, which together held roughly 95% of IDBI Bank before the sale, are to retain a combined residual stake of about 15% for later disposal, with the remainder held by public shareholders. The transfer to Fairfax is still subject to final regulatory clearance from the Reserve Bank of India.

=== Regional rural banks revamp ===
With a new policy effected in late 2010, the RRBs which served a smaller locality spanning a few districts, were merged into a state level entity following the merger of nationalised banks and their equity in RRBs getting sequentially higher. This eliminated the existential competition and cooperation between RRB's and essentially making them a subsidiary bank of the promoter nationalised bank with state equity.

=== Co-op bank Review ===
==== License Cancellations ====
===== Jul 2024 =====
In July 2024, RBI cancelled the licenses of Durga Co-operative Urban Bank, Vijayawada; Banaras Mercantile Co-operative Bank, Banaras; City Co-operative Bank, Mumbai; and Purvanchal Co-operative Bank in Ghazipur, Uttar Pradesh due to capital inadequacy and weaker earning prospects. Similarly, licenses of Sumerpur Mercantile Urban Cooperative Bank, Jai Prakash Narayan Nagari Sahakari Bank, Shree Mahalaxmi Mercantile Co-operative Bank, and Hiriyur Urban Co-operative Bank have been cancelled from January 2024.

===== Apr 2025 =====
RBI cancels licence of Colour Merchants Coop Bank based out of Ahamedabad and Ajantha Urban Co-op Bank Maryadit based out of Aurangabad citing no scope in earning potential and staying afloat as an ongoing entity. DICGC will refund depositors up to a maximum of 500,000 per account.

==== Revival ====
Incumbent Home Affairs Minister Amit Shah has said that government is keen on expanding on urban cooperative credit space and stated that every city with a population over 200,000 in India will get a co-operative bank within 5 years.

== Current period ==
The Indian banking sector is broadly classified into scheduled banks and non-scheduled banks. All banks included in the Second Schedule to the Reserve Bank of India Act, 1934 are Scheduled Banks. These banks comprise Scheduled Commercial Banks and Scheduled Co-operative Banks. Scheduled Co-operative Banks consist of Scheduled State Co-operative Banks and Scheduled Urban Cooperative Banks.

In the bank group-wise classification, IDBI Bank Ltd. is included in the category of other public sector bank.

Growth of Banking in India of Scheduled Commercial Banks
Indicators	31 March of								
Indicators	2005	2006	2007	2008	2009	2010	2011	2012	2013
Number of Commercial Banks	284	218	178	169	166	163	163	169	151
Number of Branches	70,373	72,072	74,653	78,787	82,897	88,203	94,019	102,377	109,811
Population per Banks (in thousands)	16	16	15	15	15	14	13	13	12
Aggregate Deposits	₹17,002 billion (US$180 billion)	₹21,090 billion (US$230 billion)	₹26,119 billion (US$280 billion)	₹31,969 billion (US$340 billion)	₹38,341 billion (US$410 billion)	₹44,928 billion (US$480 billion)	₹52,078 billion (US$560 billion)	₹59,091 billion (US$630 billion)	₹67,504.54 billion (US$720 billion)
Bank Credit	₹11,004 billion (US$120 billion)	₹15,071 billion (US$160 billion)	₹19,312 billion (US$210 billion)	₹23,619 billion (US$250 billion)	₹27,755 billion (US$300 billion)	₹32,448 billion (US$350 billion)	₹39,421 billion (US$420 billion)	₹46,119 billion (US$490 billion)	₹52,605 billion (US$560 billion)
Deposit as percentage to GNP (at factor cost)	62%	64%	69%	73%	77%	78%	78%	78%	79%
Per Capita Deposit	₹16,281 (US$170)	₹19,130 (US$200)	₹23,382 (US$250)	₹28,610 (US$310)	₹33,919 (US$360)	₹39,107 (US$420)	₹45,505 (US$490)	₹50,183 (US$540)	₹56,380 (US$600)
Per Capita Credit	₹10,752 (US$110)	₹13,869 (US$150)	₹17,541 (US$190)	₹21,218 (US$230)	₹24,617 (US$260)	₹28,431 (US$300)	₹34,187 (US$370)	₹38,874 (US$420)	₹44,028 (US$470)
Credit Deposit Ratio	63%	70%	74%	75%	74%	74%	76%	79%	79%

With the growth in the Indian economy expected to be strong for quite some time-especially in its services sector-the demand for banking services, especially retail banking, mortgages and investment services are expected to be strong. One may also expect M&As, takeovers, and asset sales.

In March 2006, the Reserve Bank of India allowed Warburg Pincus to increase its stake in Kotak Mahindra Bank (a private sector bank) to 10%. This was the first time an investor was allowed to hold more than 5% in a private sector bank since the RBI announced norms in 2005 that any stake exceeding 5% in the private sector banks would need to be vetted by them.

In recent years critics have charged that the non-government owned banks are too aggressive in their loan recovery efforts in connection with housing, vehicle and personal loans. There are press reports that the banks' loan recovery efforts have driven defaulting borrowers to suicide.

By 2013 the Indian Banking Industry employed 1,175,149 employees and had a total of 109,811 branches in India and 171 branches abroad and manages an aggregate deposit of ₹67,504.54 billion (US$720 billion or €640 billion) and bank credit of ₹52,604.59 billion (US$560 billion or €500 billion). The net profit of the banks operating in India was ₹1,027.51 billion (US$11 billion or €9.8 billion) against a turnover of ₹9,148.59 billion (US$98 billion or €87 billion) for the financial year 2012–13.

Pradhan Mantri Jan Dhan Yojana (Hindi: प्रधानमंत्री जन धन योजना, English: Prime Minister's People Money Scheme) is a scheme for comprehensive financial inclusion launched by the Prime Minister of India, Narendra Modi, in 2014. Run by Department of Financial Services, Ministry of Finance, on the inauguration day, 1.5 Crore (15 million) bank accounts were opened under this scheme. By 15 July 2015, 16.92 crore (169.2 million) accounts were opened, with around ₹20,288.37 crore (US$2.2 billion) were deposited under the scheme, which also has an option for opening new bank accounts with zero balance.

=== Payment Banks ===
Payments bank is a new model of banks conceptualized by the Reserve Bank of India (RBI). These banks can accept a restricted deposit, which is currently limited to ₹2 lakh per customer. These banks may not issue loans or credit cards, but may offer both current and savings accounts. Payments banks may issue ATM and debit cards, and offer net-banking and mobile-banking. The draft guidelines for licensing of payments banks in the private sector were formulated and released for public comments on 17 July 2014. The banks will be licensed as payments banks under Section 22 of the Banking Regulation Act, 1949, and will be registered as public limited company under the Companies Act, 2013.

=== Small finance banks ===
To further the objective of financial inclusion, the RBI granted approval in 2016 to ten entities to set up small finance banks. Since then, all ten have received the necessary licenses. A small finance bank is a niche type of bank to cater to the needs of people who traditionally have not used scheduled banks. Each of these banks is to open at least 25% of its branches in areas that do not have any other bank branches (unbanked regions). A small finance bank should hold 75% of its net credits in loans to firms in priority sector lending, and 50% of the loans in its portfolio must be less than ₹25 lakh (US$26,000).

== Data Breaches ==
=== 2016 Indian Banks data breach ===
A huge data breach on debit cards issued by various Indian banks was reported in October 2016. It was estimated that 3.2 million debit cards were compromised. Major Indian banks- SBI, HDFC Bank, ICICI, Yes Bank and Axis Bank were among the worst hit. Many users reported unauthorised use of their cards in China. This resulted in one of the India's biggest card replacement drive in banking history. State Bank of India announced the blocking and replacement of almost 600,000 debit cards.

== See also ==
- History of banking
- Institute of Banking Personnel Selection
- Indian Rupee
- Private-sector banks in India
- Public sector banks in India
- Sahukar
