= Chairpersons of the State Bank of India =

Chief executive of the State Bank of India

Chairman of State Bank of India

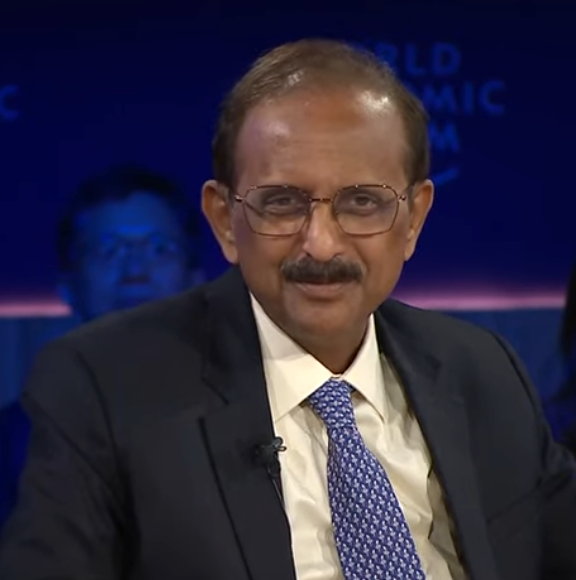
- Incumbent; Challa Sreenivasulu Setty since 28 August 2024
- Residence: Dunedin Bunglow, Mumbai
- Appointer: Government of India
- Term length: Three years
- Constituting instrument: The State Bank of India Act, 1955
- Inaugural holder: John Matthai (1955–1956)
- Formation: 1 July 1955; 71 years ago
- Deputy: 4 Managing Directors and 8 Directors
- Salary: ₹225,000 (US$2,300)
- Website: sbi.bank.in

The chairperson of the State Bank of India is the chief executive officer of India's largest scheduled commercial bank and the ex-officio chair of its Central Board of Directors. Since its establishment in 1955 by the government of India, the State Bank of India has been headed by twenty-seven chairpersons.

The term of office typically runs for three years and can, in some cases, be extended for another two years. However, in practice, only four Chairmen, Raj Kumar Talwar, O. P. Bhatt, Arundhati Bhattacharya and Dinesh Kumar Khara had their terms extended. Arundhati Bhattacharya was also the first female chairperson of the bank and continues to be the only woman to have held that post.

The inaugural officeholder was the Indian railway minister John Matthai, while Raj Kumar Talwar holds the unique distinction of having been in office for the longest time. H. V. R. Iengar and P. C. Bhattacharya also held the post of governor of the Reserve Bank of India. Borra Venkatappaiah also held the post of the Deputy governor of the Reserve Bank of India.

Although the State Bank of India, through its predecessors, the Imperial Bank of India and others, has existed in some form since 1806, this article strives to list only those chairmen who have headed the bank since its formation in its modern form, that is since 1955.

Challa Sreenivasulu Setty is the current chairman of the State Bank of India since 28 August 2024.

== SBI chairman list ==
List of chairpersons of the State Bank of India
No.	Officeholder	Portrait	Term start	Term end	Term in office	Background	Other offices held	References
1	John Matthai		1 July 1955	30 September 1956	1 year, 91 days	Economist	Minister of Railways and Minister of Finance	
2	H. V. R. Iengar		1 October 1956	28 February 1957	150 days	Indian Civil Service officer	Governor of the Reserve Bank of India	
3	P. C. Bhattacharya		1 March 1957	28 February 1962	4 years, 364 days	Indian Audits and Accounts Service officer	Governor of the Reserve Bank of India	
4	Borra Venkatappaiah		1 March 1962	28 February 1965	2 years, 364 days	Indian Civil Service (ICS) officer	Deputy governor of the Reserve Bank of India	
5	V. T. Dehejia		1 March 1965	28 February 1969	3 years, 364 days	Career civil servant	Indian Civil Service officer	
6	Raj Kumar Talwar		1 March 1969	3 August 1976	7 years, 155 days(longest tenure)	Career banker		
7	T. R. Varadachary		4 August 1976	30 April 1977	269 days	Career banker		
8	P. C. D. Nambiar		23 May 1977	13 December 1982	5 years, 204 days	Career banker		
9	V. S. Natarajan		20 December 1982	30 January 1983	41 days	Career banker		
10	R. P. Goyal		31 January 1983	30 November 1983	303 days	Career banker		
11	Vishwanath N. Nadkarni		1 December 1983	27 July 1984	239 days	Career banker		
12	D. N. Ghosh		13 May 1985	12 May 1989	3 years, 364 days	Career civil servant	Indian Audit and Accounts Service officer	
13	Atal V.		15 January 1990	17 February 1990	33 days	Career banker		
14	M. N. Goiporia		19 February 1990	31 July 1992	2 years, 163 days	Career banker	Chairman of the Central Bank of India	
15	Dipankar Basu		25 February 1993	31 August 1995	2 years, 187 days	Career banker	Economist	
16	P. G. Kakodkar		1 October 1995	31 March 1997	1 year, 181 days	Career banker	Chairman of the Goa Public Service Commission	
17	M. S. Verma		1 April 1997	30 September 1998	1 year, 182 days	Career banker	Chairman of the Telecom Regulatory Authority of India	
18	M. P. Radhakrishnan		1 December 1998	31 January 1999	61 days	Career banker	Economist	
19	G. G. Vaidya		1 February 1999	1 October 2000	1 year, 273 days	Career banker	Chairman of the State Bank of Travancore	
20	Janki Vallabh		1 November 2000	31 October 2002	1 year, 364 days	Career banker	Economist	
21	Arun Kumar Purwar		13 November 2002	31 May 2006	3 years, 199 days	Career banker	Chairman of the Federation of Indian Chambers of Commerce & Industry Senior lecturer at the University of Allahabad	
22	O. P. Bhatt		1 July 2006	31 March 2011	4 years, 279 days	Career banker	Chairman of the Indian Banks' Association	
23	Pratip Chaudhuri		7 April 2011	30 September 2013	2 years, 176 days	Career banker	Chairman of the State Bank of Saurashtra	
24	Arundhati Bhattacharya		1 October 2013	6 October 2017	4 years, 5 days	Career banker	Head of India Operations of Salesforce	
25	Rajnish Kumar		7 October 2017	6 October 2020	2 years, 365 days	Career banker	Chairman of the Indian Institute of Banking and Finance	
26	Dinesh Kumar Khara		7 October 2020	28 August 2024	3 years, 326 days	Career banker	Chairman of the SBI Life Insurance Company	
27	Challa Sreenivasulu Setty		28 August 2024	Incumbent	2 years, 52 days	Career Banker	Managing Director of the State Bank of India	

== See also ==
- State Bank of India
- List of banks that have merged to form the State Bank of India
