= CNN-News18 Indian of the Year =

Indian annual award

CNN–News18 Indian of the Year
- Awarded for: An Honour That Embodies Greatness
- Country: India
- Presented by: CNN-News18
- First award: 2006
- Website: indianoftheyear.com

The CNN–News18 Indian of the Year (initially CNN–IBN Indian of the Year) is an award presented annually to various Indians for their work in their respective fields by the Indian media house CNN–News18. The awards are presented in various categories of Politics, Sports, Business, Entertainment, Public Service and Global Indian. The idea of the award was originated by journalists: Rajdeep Sardesai and Sagarika Ghose.

In addition to the traditional award categories of Politics, Business, Sports, Entertainment, Public Service and Global Indian, a new category, that of a 'CNN-IBN Indian of the Year – Popular Choice' was introduced in the ninth edition, where one awardee was chosen from the 35 nominees across categories basis the votes received from public through Facebook.

== Winners ==
=== Main awards ===
Ceremony	Year	Person	Politics	Sports	Business	Entertainment	Public Service	Global Indian
1st	2006	Manmohan Singh	Manmohan Singh	Jeev Milkha Singh	Ratan Tata	Rajkumar Hirani	Arvind Kejriwal	Indra Nooyi
2nd	2007	E. Sreedharan	P. Chidambaram	Viswanathan Anand	O. P. Bhatt	Shimit Amin and Jaideep Sahni	E. Sreedharan	Arun Sarin
3rd	2008	Chandrayaan	Nitish Kumar	Abhinav Bindra	Aditya Puri	Aamir Khan	Team Chandrayaan	A. R. Rahman
4th	2009	A. R. Rahman	Rahul Gandhi	Saina Nehwal	Satyam Revival Team	A. R. Rahman	Pratham	---
5th	2010	Nitish Kumar	Nitish Kumar	Sushil Kumar	Kumar Mangalam Birla	S. Shankar	Ladakh Ecological Development Group & Seeds India	---
6th	2011	Anna Hazare	Mamata Banerjee	Mahendra Singh Dhoni	Dilip Shanghvi	Amitabh Bachchan and team KBC	Binalakshmi Nepram, Founder of the Manipur Women Gun Survivors Network	---
7th	2012	Viswanathan Anand	Manohar Parrikar	Viswanathan Anand	Yusuf Hamied	Irrfan Khan	Devi Prasad Shetty	---
8th	2013	Stop Acid Attack	Arvind Kejriwal	P. V. Sindhu	Rajiv Bajaj	Kapil Sharma	ADR & Lily Thomas	---
9th	2014	Narendra Modi	Arun Jaitley	Jitu Rai	N. Chandrasekaran	Chetan Bhagat	Tongam Rina	Satya Nadella
10th	2015	People of Chennai	---	Sania Mirza	Bandhan Bank	S. S. Rajamouli	People of Chennai	---
11th	2017	Virat Kohli		Kidambi Srikanth	Acharya Balkrishna	Raj Kumar Rao	Afroz Shah	
——	2018–2021	Not held						
12th	2022	Neeraj Chopra	Yogi Adityanath	Neeraj Chopra	---	Allu Arjun	---	---
13th	2023	Shah Rukh Khan	Narendra Modi	Neeraj Chopra	Dinesh Kumar Khara	Mani Ratnam	---	---
14th	2024	Kartik Aryan	---	Jasprit Bumrah	Sangita Reddy	Lapata Ladies	Adhik Kadam	---
15th	2025	Harmanpreet Kaur		Suruchi Phogat	Baba Kalyani	Arijit Singh		Chef Vijay Kumar

=== Special awards ===
1. 2007

- Lifetime Achievement - R K Laxman

2. 2008

- Lifetime Achievement - Dilip Kumar
- Special Awards - Tukaram Omble
- Special Awards - Mumbai Police
- Special Awards - Sheila Dikshit

3. 2009

- Lifetime Achievement - Pandit Ravi Shankar
- Special Awards - Kamal Haasan
- Special Awards - Indian Cricket Team

4. 2010

- Lifetime Achievement - M. S. Swaminathan

5. 2011

- Lifetime Achievement - Verghese Kurien
- Outstanding Achievement - K J Yesudas
- Special Awards - Yuvraj Singh
- Special Awards - Manipur Women Gun Survivors Network
- Special Awards - Ronjan Sodhi

6. 2012

- Lifetime Achievement - Heroes of Rezang La, 1962
- Special Awards - Aamir Khan & Team Satyamev Jayate
- Special Awards - MC Mary Kom
- Special Awards - Tessy Thomas & Team DRDO

7. 2013

- Outstanding Achievement - Leander Paes
- 2013 Outstanding Achievement - Ramakant Achrekar
- Special Awards - Team ITBP and NDRF
- Special Awards - Deepika Padukone

8. 2014

- Lifetime Achievement Award: ISRO team
- Outstanding Achievement Award: Azim Premji, Kailash Satyarthi
- Special Achievement Award: Kangana Ranaut
- Popular Choice Award: Kalvakuntla Chandrashekar Rao, P Vijayan
- Public Service: Tongam Rina
- Politics: Arun Jaitley
- Global Indian: Satya Nadella

8. 2015

- Lifetime Achievement Award: Balbir Singh Dosanjh
- Outstanding Achievement Award: Dr.Bindeshwar Pathak, United Technologies (Make in India)
- Special Achievement Award: Kangana Ranaut, Ranveer Singh
- Public Service: People of Chennai
- Special Jury Award: Leander Paes

10. 2017

- Outstanding Achievement in Business: Adar Poonawalla
- Special Achievement Award: India women's national cricket team
- Special Achievement Award: Manushi Chhillar
- Outstanding Achievement in Entertainment (2017): Team Baahubali

12. 2022

- Outstanding Achievement - Sania Mirza, Ranveer Singh
- Special Achievement - Sonu Sood
- Climate Warrior - M. Yoganathan
- Social Change - Shankare Gowda
- Start-ups - Zoho Corporation
- Special Mention - Kulsum Shadab Wahab

13. 2023

- Outstanding Achievement - ISRO
- Youth Icon (Jury) - Trinetra Haldar Gummaraju
- Youth Icon (Popular) - Anirudh Ravichander
- Climate Warriors - Arun Krishnamurthy, Saalumarada Thimmakka
- Social Change - Ravi Kannan R
- Special Mention - Heroes of Uttarkashi

== See also ==
- NDTV Indian of the Year
