= Arunachal Christian Forum =

Apex body of Christian denominations in Arunachal Pradesh, India

- Abbreviation: ACF
- Type: Apex body of Christian denominations
- Headquarters: Itanagar, Arunachal Pradesh, India
- Region served: Arunachal Pradesh
- President: James Techi Tara

The Arunachal Christian Forum (ACF). is an apex body of various Christian denominations in Arunachal Pradesh, India.

== Leadership ==
In early 2025, the forum was led by its president, Tarh Miri, with James Techi Tara as its secretary-general. By 2026, James Techi Tara was described as the forum's president.

== Activities ==
The forum's main public activity has been its opposition to the Arunachal Pradesh Freedom of Religion Act, 1978 (APFRA), a law that declares a follower of christianity or islam to loose their indigenous status. The forum has demanded the repeal of the Act, which it describes as unconstitutional, anti-Christian, and draconian, arguing that the law violates the right to freedom of religion under Article 25 of the Constitution. The campaign around the Act revived after the Itanagar bench of the Gauhati High Court directed the state government in September 2024 to finalise the rules to implement it.

In February 2025, the ACF announced a week-long fast beginning on 10 February, and on 17 February it observed an eight-hour hunger strike at Borum, near Itanagar. On 6 March 2025, it held a rally at Borum, where president Tarh Miri said more than two lakh people gathered; the demonstration had been planned near the state legislative assembly but was moved after permission was denied. Forum leaders met the state home minister, Mama Natung, on 21 February 2025, in a meeting that ended without a resolution.

The state government later included the ACF, alongside the Indigenous Faith and Cultural Society of Arunachal Pradesh (IFCSAP) and other organisations, in a high-powered committee headed by Justice (retired) B. P. Katakey to frame the rules under the Act. Although its president was made a member, the forum said the committee's constitution undermined its demand for the Act to be scrapped. After the committee submitted its report in 2026, the ACF urged the government to suspend the rule-framing process and hold detailed consultations with all stakeholders, saying that implementation could affect constitutional rights, religious freedom, and social harmony.

The forum's campaign has run against that of the IFCSAP, which has called for the Act to be implemented. In June 2026, the ACF accused the IFCSAP of pursuing a politically motivated campaign and urged the state government to investigate it, with its president saying the renewed demand for the Act had been influenced by external forces seeking to disturb the state's communal harmony.
