= Arunachal church burnings, 1968–1978 =

Violence in NEFA/Arunachal Pradesh, India

Anti-Christian violence in Arunachal Pradesh
- 1968–1978; Part of Religious history of Northeast India
- Date: 1968 – October 1978
- Location: North-East Frontier Agency / Arunachal Pradesh, India
- Caused by: Saffronisation; indigenous-faith reform
- Methods: Administrative restrictions; Arson and vandalism of churches; Arrests of pastors
- Result: Enactment of the Arunachal Pradesh Freedom of Religion Act, 1978

Parties
NEFA / Arunachal Pradesh administration; indigenous-faith bodies	Christian missions and congregations

Lead figures
K. A. A. Raja (lieutenant governor); Talom Rukbo; Eknath Ranade; Takeng Taggu (till 1976)	Local clergy, Takeng Taggu (as Revival Pastor)

Casualties and losses
	c. 254 churches burnt or vandalised; over 5,000 reported cases of arson; 47 churches burnt in one region by 1974

Between 1968 and 1978, Christian communities in the North-East Frontier Agency (NEFA), renamed Arunachal Pradesh in January 1972, faced a period of persecution that included church burnings, a crackdown on missionaries, and arrests of pastors and converts, alongside standing Inner Line restrictions on missionary entry. Journalistic accounts associate the crackdown with the tenure of K. A. A. Raja, the territory's first chief commissioner and later first lieutenant governor. It has also been documented by the Government of Arunachal Pradesh including Bundle-Con-1970-73, titled as Confidential Files, which contains 16 files. Among them is a 1970 confidential file titled "National Integration, Protection of culture and religious faiths of the people of NEFA".

== Overview ==
According to Christianity Today, police burned churches, looted homes, and attacked Christian families between 1968 and 1974, with 47 churches reportedly torched in a single region in 1974. A former Adi policeman, Takeng Taggu, later recalled having burned churches and arrested missionaries on government orders during this period before he himself converted. A 1990 dispatch by the Catholic agency UCA News, the main contemporaneous Christianpress account, reported substantially higher decade-long totals.

The period overlapped with the founding of the Donyi-Polo revival among the Tani communities and the entry of RSS-affiliated organisations, developments later linked by scholars to the administrative climate of the time.

In 1978, when Arunachal Pradesh was still a union territory administered directly by the central government, accounting for this incident, its legislature passed the Arunachal Pradesh Freedom of Religion Act, which prohibits conversion by force, inducement, or fraud. The period thus is also regarded as the culmination for the passing of the Arunachal Pradesh Freedom of Religion Act, which is an attempt to prohibit proselytism.
