= G. G. Vaidya =

Indian career banker

19th Chairman of State Bank of India
- Preceded by: M. P. Radhakrishnan
- Succeeded by: Janki Vallabh

G. G. Vaidya was an Indian career banker who served as the nineteenth Chairman of State Bank of India.

== Personal life ==
He has one son, Ashish Vaidya, who like him is also a banker, having worked for HDFC Bank. Ashish Vaidya is currently Head of Trading at the Swiss Bank UBS.

== Career ==
He joined the State Bank of India as a probationary officer and served in a number of roles until finally becoming the Chairman of State Bank of India in 1999.

He served as the nineteenth Chairman of State Bank of India from 1 February 1999 until 31 October 2000.

It has been claimed that he was largely responsible for the bank's adoption of new technology, primarily the core banking solution known as CBS:

It was during G.G. Vaidya's tenure that the bank began harnessing technology to streamline operations. In early 2000, the bank laid the foundation of core banking solution (CBS). A CBS allows customers to operate their bank account from anywhere and anytime. The actual implementation started in 2003 during Purwar's tenure and completed in July 2008 when Bhatt was the bank's chairman.

— Business Today (India)

== Legacy ==
He was responsible for a number of financial innovations being introduced to the Indian Banking Industry during his tenure. For example, the India Millennium Deposit bonds were introduced during his tenure. The objective of the bonds was to raise deposits from non-resident Indians for the purpose of contributing funds towards India's infrastructure and growth.

It was also during his tenure that State Bank of India entered the insurance sector and started selling life insurance.
