= Rajnish Kumar (banker) =

Indian banker

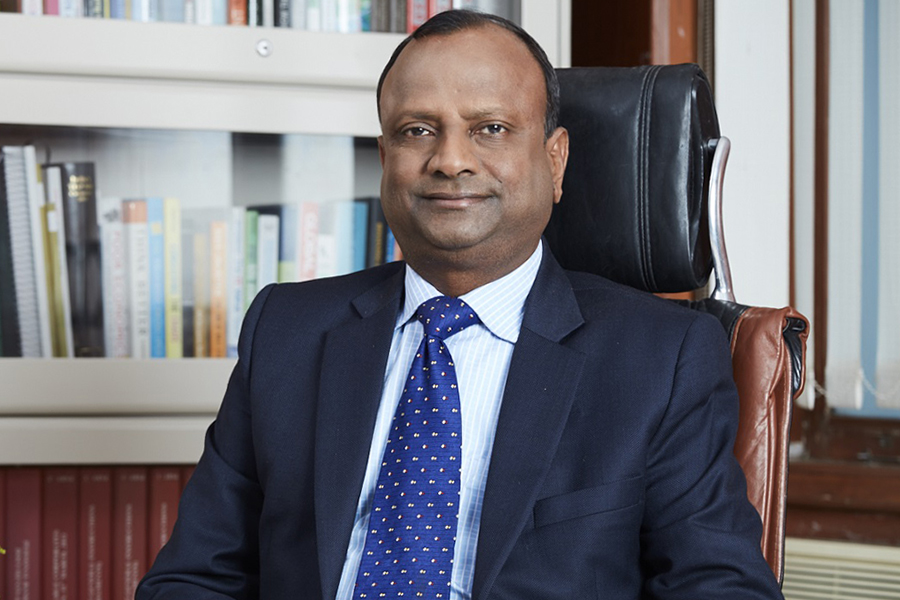

25th Chairperson of State Bank of India
- In office 7 October 2017 – 6 October 2020
- Preceded by: Arundhati Bhattacharya
- Succeeded by: Dinesh Kumar Khara

Personal details
- Born: 14 January 1958 (age 68)

Rajnish Kumar is an Indian banker. He held the position of chairman of the State Bank of India.

He joined SBI as a probationary officer in 1980. He has served as managing director (National Banking Group), a position he was given on 2 November 2015 and the managing director (compliance and risk) of SBI. He also cracked the Certified Associate of Indian Institute of Bankers of Indian Institute of Banking and Finance. The senior bank official previously also headed the SBI Capital Markets Limited (the Merchant Banking arm of State Bank of India) as managing director and chief executive officer, prior to becoming managing director in SBI. He is also the chairman of Management Development Institute (MDI) Gurgaon, one of the top management institutes of India in the private business schools category.

== Competence ==
O. P. Bhatt lauded Kumar's experience in the corporate banking and international banking divisions of State Bank of India. Laying out his agenda Rajnish Kumar said,

NPA management has been one of the biggest agendas being pursued by Mrs Bhattacharya. We will continue that agenda. The bank is already in the midst of a digital transformation, which in itself is a big change. The market is also very competitive and we will have to be on our toes in this matter.
