= Political hypocrisy =

Discrepancy between a politicians' claims and practices

Political hypocrisy refers to any discrepancy between what politicians claim and the practices politicians are trying to hide. Modern political debate is often characterized by accusations and counter-accusations of hypocrisy.

== Definition ==
The notion of hypocrisy has its origins in the theater. The Greek word (hypokrisis) meant 'acting' and the first 'hypocrites' were classical theater actors. As a result, the phrase was first used to describe the theatrical function of appearing to be someone else. As an attempt to separate one's personal behavior from the standards that apply to everyone else, hypocrisy in its pejorative connotation always implies some form of deception. American political journalist Michael Gerson says that political hypocrisy is "the conscious use of a mask to fool the public and gain political benefit".

== Views of early modern Western philosophers ==
The English philosopher Thomas Hobbes was an outspoken opponent of political hypocrisy, though he considered it inevitable. David Runciman writes that "Hobbes was at pains not to set the bar for sincerity too high, which would let in the most corrosive forms of hypocrisy through the back door. But he also believed that some forms of hypocrisy, unchecked, would render political life impossible". The author Bernard Mandeville goes further, distinguishing two types of hypocrisy: one in which politicians wear a mask of hypocrisy to protect public interests, and the other more sinister hypocrisy to serve the interests of malicious politicians. The distinction between the two, as Mandeville seeks to demonstrate, is difficult to maintain in any political setting. The philosopher Jean-Jacques Rousseau devoted much of his writing to creating portraits of innocence, virtue, and integrity as counterpoints to his scathing critique of the corruption, flattery, and hypocrisy that afflicted the social and political life in his view. For the British philosopher Jeremy Bentham, the mask of hypocrisy is intended to conceal or deceive and must always be removed. Similarly, in his book On Compromise (dubbed "The Prince for Victorian liberalism" by his biographer), the British politician John Morley expresses his concerns about the triumph of the political spirit, which he defines as the abandonment of principles and the willingness of politicians of all stripes to dissimulate and compromise in the name of the party. In contrast, the English philosopher Francis Bacon, believed that wisdom is striking the correct balance between honesty and deception, so that one's reputation for honesty and their ability to deceive are both preserved.

== In democracies ==
In democratic politics, according to Dhruba Ghosh, the need for hypocrisy arises from the structure of political interactions. David Runciman suggests that hypocrisy is common in politics and particularly unavoidable in liberal democratic democracies: "No one likes it, but everyone is at it." In her book Ordinary Vices (1984), Judith Shklar downplays hypocrisy, ranking it as an unimportant vice based on its damage to liberal communities in comparison with, for instance, cruelty. Nevertheless, because hypocrisy is despised and commonplace, Shklar writes that democratic politicians are often tempted to reveal their opponents' double standards: it is easier to dispose of an opponent's character by exposing his hypocrisy than to challenge his political convictions. Shklar believes that we should be more accepting of hypocrisy and realize that liberal democratic politics can only be sustained with a certain amount of deception and pretense.

== See also ==
- Political integrity
- Double standard

== Sources ==
- Runciman, David (2008). Political Hypocrisy: The Mask of Power, from Hobbes to Orwell and Beyond ... United Kingdom: Princeton University Press. ISBN 978-0-691-12931-0.
- Ghosh, D. N. (2011). "Hypocrisy in Democratic Politics". Economic and Political Weekly. 46 (15): 32–35. JSTOR 41152314.
