= Ashok Sarangi =

CGM in Charge Reserve Bank of India
- Incumbent
- Assumed office 25 April 2014
- Preceded by: A K Bera

Personal details
- Born: 15 June 1959 Odisha, India
- Children: 1
- Education: M.Phil
- Alma mater: Jawaharlal Nehru University
- Occupation: Banker, Editor
- Known for: Officer in charge, RBI Belapur

Ashok Kumar Sarangi (born 15 June 1959) is a 1987 Batch Grade-A Officer of Reserve Bank of India. He was a Chief General Manager in RBI. He was also the Chief Vigilance Officer (CVO) and Transparency Officer. He is the only public sector executive to simultaneously hold these three positions. He was also editor of the journal Without Reserve. He has the unique distinction of being the longest serving in-charge of Human Resources Department of RBI. He is also a member of the Education Committee of Indian Institute of Banking and Finance.

== Early life and education ==
Ashok Sarangi was born on 15 June 1959 in Sambalpur. After his early education in Odisha, he obtained his post graduation and Master in Philosophy degrees from Jawaharlal Nehru University. He is also a certified associate of the Indian Institute of Banking and Finance.

== Career and achievements ==
Sarangi joined Reserve Bank of India on 20 July 1987 as a Grade-A officer. He quickly rose through the ranks, becoming General Manager of Currency Management Department in 2001. He took over from A K Bera as officer in charge of RBI Belapur in 2008. He became Chief General Manager of Human Resources Department in 2014. Subsequently, he was elevated to the position of Chief General Manager in Charge and Chief Vigilance Officer of RBI. He also took over from R. L. Das as Transparency Officer. For a brief period he served as GM (Administration) at RBI, Nagpur. Sarangi made glorious contributions as the Editor of the journal "Without Reserve". Under his editorship the journal has won several Gold and Silver awards at national level.

Sarangi has also taken initiatives for propagating inter-bank sports meets. He has been a spokesperson for improving productivity of employees with disabilities in public sector banks.

In September 2018, when RBI officers and employee unions threatened to go on mass casual leave demanding pension updation, the matter was amicably resolved through a series of meeting with Sarangi and Deputy Governor Viral Acharya.

== Major contributions ==
Sarangi has taken pioneering initiatives for settlement of industrial disputes.

== Controversies ==
In June 2018 Bombay High Court issued a contempt notice to Ashok Sarangi and other officials for violating guidelines on validation of caste claims of employees.

== Important assignments ==
- Chief General Manager in Charge, Reserve Bank of India
- Member, Education Committee, Indian Institute of Banking and Finance
- Editor, "Without Reserve"
- Officer in Charge, RBI Belapur
- Chief Vigilance Officer, RBI
- Transparency Officer
