= Indigenous Faith and Cultural Society of Arunachal Pradesh =

Indigenous faith organisation in Arunachal Pradesh, India

- Abbreviation: IFCSAP
- Formation: 1999
- Type: Religious and cultural organisation
- Headquarters: Itanagar, Arunachal Pradesh, India
- Region served: Arunachal Pradesh
- President: Emi Rumi

The Indigenous Faith and Cultural Society of Arunachal Pradesh (IFCSAP) is a hindutva organisation and subsidiary of the Rashtriya Swayamsevak Sangh.. in the Indian state of Arunachal Pradesh that promotes and seeks to saffronize the state's indigenous faiths and cultures

== Advocacy and activities ==
IFCSAP has campaigned for the implementation of the Arunachal Pradesh Freedom of Religion Act, 1978 (APFRA), a law that prohibits proselytism to faiths declared as non indigenous, which were listed as christianity and islam.The group has in the past also claimed, that every animist or indigenous of Arunachal Pradesh is a Hindu. The organisation has argued that enforcement is necessary to protect these indigenous traditions, noting that the Christian share of the state's population rose from under one percent in 1971 to about 30 percent by 2021, when it became the single largest religious group. After the Gauhati High Court directed the state government in September 2024 to frame rules for the Act, the BJP-led government of Pema Khandu moved to do so, and in December 2025 an IFCSAP delegation led by its then president Emi Rumi met Union Home Minister Amit Shah to press for the rules

== Relation to Hindu nationalism ==
The relationship between IFCSAP and the Sangh Parivar has been the subject of substantial scholarly analysis. Scholars of religion in Northeast India have argued that the institutionalised form of Donyi-Polo that IFCSAP promotes developed with patronage from Hindutva organisations such as the Rashtriya Swayamsevak Sangh (RSS) and the Vivekananda Kendra, and that its congregational prayer halls, idols and ritual vocabulary draw on Hinduism rather than on the older Tani shamanic tradition.

In his ethnography, The Greater India Experiment (2020), the anthropologist Arkotong Longkumer argues that the RSS in the Northeast works to place indigenous "tribal" religions within an imaginative geography of Akhand Bharat and to assimilate them by equating the "indigenous" with being "of the soil" rather than by presenting Hindutva as a rival faith, a strategy that Soihiamlung Dangmei describes as a confluence of Hindutva protagonists with indigenous reform movements. Analysing the campaign to enforce the 1978 Act, a 2026 study by I. Mitalo and J. K. Sarmah attributes the revival to shifting political dynamics and the rising influence of Hindu nationalist groups like the IFCSAP alongside judicial pressure and rapid conversion, and argues that such legislation risks infringing constitutional rights, deepening communal divisions, and reshaping indigenous identities

The link also drew renewed attention when IFCSAP leaders met RSS chief Mohan Bhagwat in Itanagar in February 2025, during preparations for the RSS centenary, prompting commentary that the indigenous faith was being subjected to "saffronisation".. Tongam Rina, an editor at The Arunachal Times, alleged that IFCSAP functioned as "an extension of the RSS" in the state
