= A. K. Bera =

Indian banker

PCGM at Reserve Bank of India
- In office 1 April 2011 – 31 October 2014
- Preceded by: Deepak Singhal
- Succeeded by: Ashok Sarangi

Personal details
- Born: 1954 (age 72) West Bengal, India
- Children: 1
- Education: Calcutta University; Indian Institute of Banking and Finance
- Occupation: Banker
- Known for: Officer-in-charge, RBI Belapur
- Nickname: Behraji

A. K. Bera is an Indian banker from Assam.

== Early life and education ==
A K Bera was born in 1954 in West Bengal. He obtained his post graduation in economics from Calcutta University. He is also a certified associate of the Indian Institute of Banking and Finance.

== Career in RBI ==
Bera joined the Reserve Bank of India in 1978. He worked in various areas, including public debt management, government & bank accounts and cooperative banking. His career took off when as an administrator, he took over as officer-in-charge of RBI Belapur in 2005. He was elevated to the position of chief general manager in 2006. Subsequently, he served as regional director of Gujarat State from 2009 to 2011, before being appointed as chief general manager of RBI in DGBA. As the chief general manager, he was signatory to three consecutive balance sheets of RBI from 2011 to 2013. In recognition of his outstanding work, he was elevated to the position of principal chief general manager in 2011. In 2014 he became the longest-serving PCGM of Urban Banks Department.

== Outstanding achievement ==
Bera has the distinction of being the signatory to three consecutive balance sheets of RBI as its chief general manager from 2011 to 2013. He was also instrumental in bringing Core Banking Solution to RBI. He has been the longest serving GM-in-Charge of RBI Belapur. During his tenure the irregularities in the construction of RBI staff quarters at Kharghar were addressed. Under his leadership, Guidelines on Inspection and Audit Systems in Urban Cooperative Banks (UCB) were released in 2014. As PCGM of RBI, he was instrumental in addressing a large cross section of professionals on regulatory concerns pertaining to UCBs. As regional director of Gujarat, he had taken initiatives for cautioning the public about electronic frauds and phishing mails.

== Important assignments ==
- Regional Director, Gujarat, Daman & Diu
- Officer in Charge, RBI Belapur
- Chief General Manager, RBI (Dept of Govt & Bank Accounts)
- Principal Chief General Manager, Urban Banks, RBI
- Chairman, Task Force for Diamond Sector

== See also ==
- Ashok Kumar Sarangi
