= Kakodkar =

Kakodkar is a surname. Notable people with the surname include:

- Anil Kakodkar (born 1943), Indian nuclear physicist
- P. G. Kakodkar (1937–2020), Indian banker
- Purushottam Kakodkar (1913–1998), Indian politician
- Shashikala Kakodkar (1935–2016), Indian politician
