= K. A. A. Raja =

Indian civil servant, first Lieutenant Governor of Arunachal Pradesh

First Lieutenant Governor of the Union Territory of Arunachal Pradesh
- In office 15 August 1975 – 1979
- Preceded by: office established
- Succeeded by: R. N. Haldipur

Chief Commissioner of Arunachal Pradesh (formerly North-East Frontier Agency)
- In office 21 January 1972 – 15 August 1975

Security Commissioner, North-East Frontier Agency
- In office c. late 1960s – 1972

Personal details
- Occupation: Indian Administrative Service officer
- Known for: Administration of NEFA / Arunachal Pradesh in the 1970s

K. A. A. Raja was an Indian bureaucrat of the Indian Administrative Service who served as the first Chief Commissioner of Arunachal Pradesh from its reconstitution as a Union Territory on 21 January 1972, and subsequently as its first Lieutenant Governor.

== Political career ==
Raja joined the Indian Army and rose to the ranks of lieutenant colonel. He was later appointed as Political Officer of the Tirap Frontier Division. During this tenure, he undertook several projects for road construction to develop a network of communication in the frontier areas. He was elevated to the position of Security Commissioner before his subsequent appointment as the Advisor of the then Governor of Assam Pran Nath Luthra.

After the reorganisation of Assam, North-East Frontier Agency was created a separate union territory as Arunachal Pradesh in 1972 with Raja as the first Chief Commissioner. One of this first achievements was the conduct of panchayat elections in every village leading to the creation of the Pradesh Council. Subsequently, Arunachal Pradesh's representation in the Lok Sabha elections was raised to two seats. Raja was appointed the territory's Lieutenant Governor in 1975 along with a provisional assembly.

On Raja's invitation to open schools in the territory, Eknath Ranade, then general secretary of the Rashtriya Swayamsevak Sangh, established eight Vivekananda Kendra Vidyalaya in 1977. During this tenure too, Raja continued to facilitate road construction projects for increased connectivity.

His tenure was marked with anti-Christian violence in the territory. Between 1968 and 1974 police were reported to have burned churches, looted homes and attacked Christian families, with 47 churches torched in a single region in 1974. In 1990, a retrospective dispatch from UCA News stated that, as NEFA Security Commissioner, Raja "initiated a series of persecutions to destroy Christianity" in Arunachal Pradesh, and reported approximately 254 churches burnt or vandalised across the decade, with over 5,000 cases of arson and 47 churches burnt down by 1974. Before the end of Raja's tenure, the territory passed the Arunachal Pradesh Freedom of Religion Act 1978.

Raja was succeeded by Ramdas Narayan Haldipur on 18 January 1979.

== Legacy ==
Raja is viewed as a staunch Hindu who worked towards saffronising the indigenous customs and traditions of the people of Arunachal Pradesh.

In 2022, he was awarded the Arunachal Ratna posthumously.

== See also ==
- Donyi-Polo
- Ralengnao Khathing, Arunachal Ratna awardee
