= J. C. Almeida =

Indian civil servant (1930–2017)

Jose Conceição Almeida
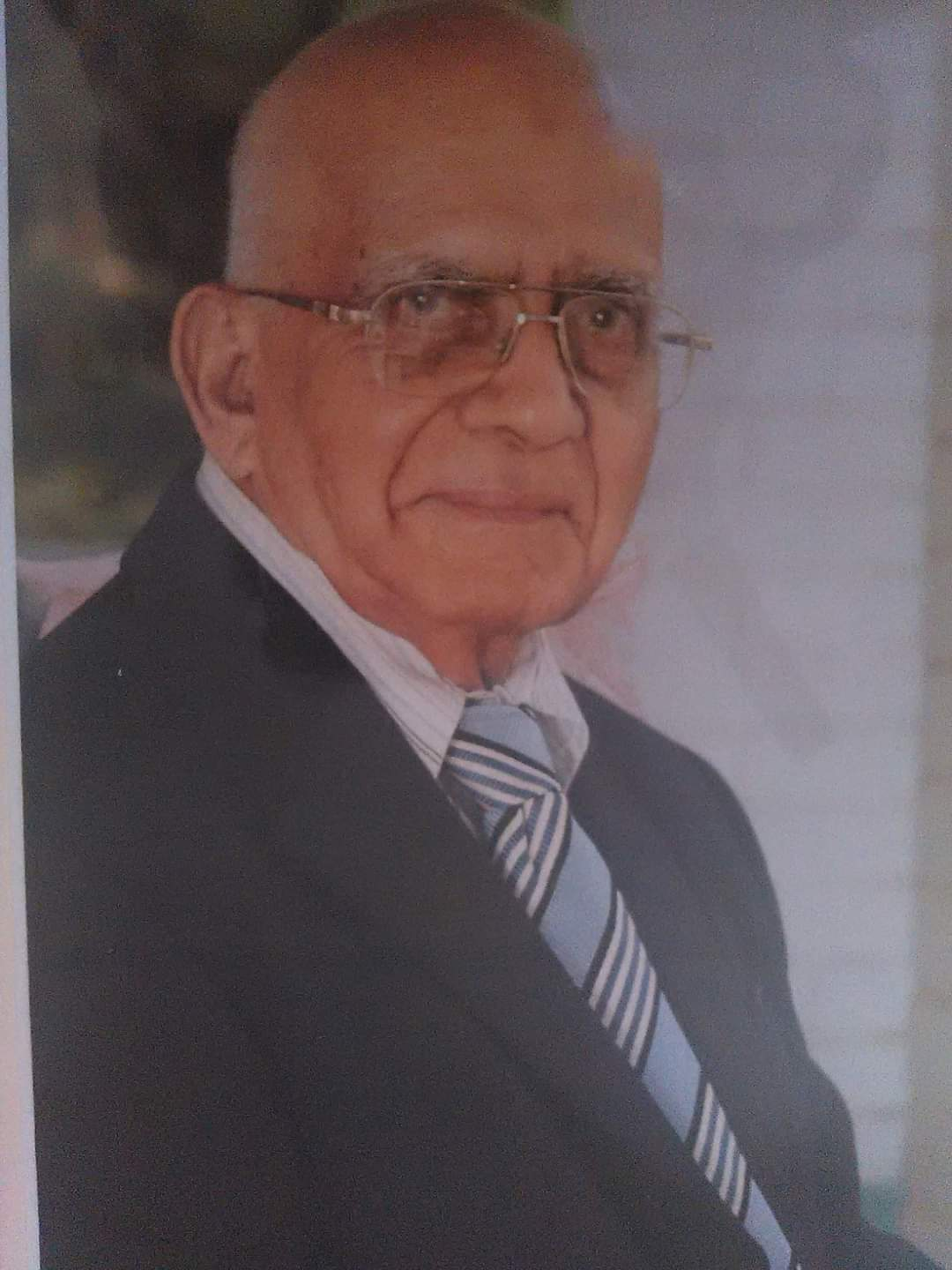
- Jose Conceição Almeida

Personal details
- Born: 6 March 1930 Goa, India
- Died: 28 November 2017 (aged 87) Miramar, Goa, India
- Occupation: Indian Administrative Service officer
- Known for: Former Chief Secretary of Goa, Daman and Diu; First Chairman of the Goa Public Service Commission

Jose Conceição Almeida (6 March 1930 – 28 November 2017), also known as Dr J. C. Almeida, was an Indian Administrative Service officer and economist from Goa. He served as Chief Secretary of Goa, Daman and Diu and was the first Chairman of the Goa Public Service Commission after Goa became a state.

== Early life and education ==
Almeida was born on 6 March 1930 in Goa, Portuguese India. He received his primary education at the Instituto Abade Faria in Margão and secondary education at the Liceu Nacional Afonso de Albuquerque in Pangim. In 1951, he moved to Lisbon to study at the Instituto Superior de Ciências Económicas e Financeiras of the Technical University of Lisbon, graduating in Economics in 1957.

== Career ==
=== Work in Portugal and return to Portuguese Goa ===
After graduation, Almeida taught at a technical school in Tomar, Portugal, and worked as a Section Officer in the Ministry of Finance, Lisbon. In 1958, he returned to Goa as Chefe de Repartição de Estatística, establishing the General Statistical Department. He also served as Managing Director of Caixa Económica de Goa and advisor to Emissora de Goa.

=== Transition to Indian administration ===
Following Goa's liberation in 1961, Almeida helped integrate the region into the Indian administrative system.

=== Chief Secretary and Public Service ===
He served as Secretary and Development Commissioner and later as Chief Secretary of Goa, Daman, and Diu. After statehood in 1987, he became the first Chairman of the Goa Public Service Commission (GPSC) and also served as Managing Director of the Economic Development Corporation. He retired on 6 March 1992.

== Academic and literary work ==
Almeida earned a PhD in Economics from the University of Lisbon. He authored Goa: Administration and Economy Before and After 1962, which is used as a reference work in academic institutions.

== Death and legacy ==
Almeida died on 28 November 2017 in Miramar, Goa. He is remembered for his integrity, discipline, and contributions to Goa’s administrative and socio-economic development.

== Publications ==
- Almeida, Jose Conceição. Goa: Administration and Economy Before and After 1962. Panaji: Civitas and Broadway Publishing House, 2013. ISBN 978-93-80837-58-1.
