= Integrity =

Moral virtue and practice

Integrity is the quality of being honest and having a consistent and uncompromising adherence to strong moral and ethical principles and values. In ethics, integrity is regarded as the honesty and truthfulness or earnestness of one's actions. Integrity can stand in opposition to hypocrisy. It regards internal consistency as a virtue, and suggests that people who hold apparently conflicting values should account for the discrepancy or alter those values.

The word integrity evolved from the Latin adjective integer, meaning whole or complete. In this context, integrity is the inner sense of "wholeness" deriving from qualities such as honesty and consistency of character.

== In ethics ==
In ethics, a person is said to possess the virtue of integrity if the person's actions are based upon an internally consistent framework of principles. These principles should uniformly adhere to sound logical axioms or postulates. A person has ethical integrity to the extent that the person's actions, beliefs, methods, measures, and principles align with a well-integrated core group of values. A person must, therefore, be flexible and willing to adjust these values to maintain consistency when these values are challenged—such as when observed results are incongruous with expected outcomes. Because such flexibility is a form of accountability, it is regarded as a moral responsibility as well as a virtue.

A person's value system provides a framework within which the person acts in ways that are consistent and expected. Integrity can be seen as the state of having such a framework and acting congruently within it.

One essential aspect of a consistent framework is its avoidance of any unwarranted (arbitrary) exceptions for a particular person or group—especially the person or group that holds the framework. In law, this principle of universal application requires that even those in positions of official power can be subjected to the same laws as pertain to their fellow citizens. In personal ethics, this principle requires that one should not act according to any rule that one would not wish to see universally followed. For example, one should not steal unless one would want to live in a world in which everyone was a thief. The philosopher Immanuel Kant formally described the principle of universality of application for one's motives in his categorical imperative.

The concept of integrity implies a wholeness—a comprehensive corpus of beliefs often referred to as a worldview. This concept of wholeness emphasizes honesty and authenticity, requiring that one act at all times in accordance with one's worldview.

Ethical integrity is not synonymous with the good, as Zuckert and Zuckert show about Ted Bundy:

When caught, he defended his actions in terms of the fact-value distinction. He scoffed at those, like the professors from whom he learned the fact-value distinction, who still lived their lives as if there were truth-value to value claims. He thought they were fools and that he was one of the few who had the courage and integrity to live a consistent life in light of the truth that value judgments, including the command "Thou shalt not kill," are merely subjective assertions.

— Zuckert and Zuckert, The truth about Leo Strauss: political philosophy and American democracy

== In politics ==
Politicians are given power to make, execute, or control policy, which can have important consequences. They typically promise to exercise this power in a way that serves society, but may not do so, which opposes the notion of integrity. Aristotle said that because rulers have power they will be tempted to use it for personal gain.

In the book The Servant of the People, Muel Kaptein says integrity should start with politicians knowing what their position entails, because the consistency required by integrity applies also to the consequences of one's position. Integrity also demands knowledge and compliance with both the letter and the spirit of the written and unwritten rules. Integrity is also acting consistently not only with what is generally accepted as moral, what others think, but primarily with what is ethical, what politicians should do based on reasonable arguments.

Important virtues of politicians are faithfulness, humility, and accountability. Furthermore, they should be authentic and a role model. Aristotle identified dignity (megalopsychia, variously translated as proper pride, greatness of soul, and magnanimity) as the crown of the virtues, distinguishing it from vanity, temperance, and humility.

== In psychological/work-selection tests ==
"Integrity tests" or (more confrontationally) "honesty tests" aim to identify prospective employees who may hide perceived negative or derogatory aspects of their past, such as a criminal conviction or drug abuse. Identifying unsuitable candidates can save the employer from problems that might otherwise arise during their term of employment. Integrity tests make certain assumptions, specifically:

- that persons who have "low integrity" report more dishonest behaviour
- that persons who have "low integrity" try to find reasons to justify such behaviour
- that persons who have "low integrity" think others more likely to commit crimes—like theft, for example. (Since people seldom sincerely declare to prospective employers their past deviance, the "integrity" testers adopted an indirect approach: letting the work-candidates talk about what they think of the deviance of other people, considered in general, as a written answer demanded by the questions of the "integrity test".)
- that persons who have "low integrity" exhibit impulsive behaviour
- that persons who have "low integrity" tend to think that society should severely punish deviant behaviour (specifically, "integrity tests" assume that people who have a history of deviance report within such tests that they support harsher measures applied to the deviance exhibited by other people.)

The claim that such tests can detect "fake" answers plays a crucial role in detecting people who have low integrity. Naive respondents really believe this pretense and behave accordingly, reporting some of their past deviance and their thoughts about the deviance of others, fearing that if they do not answer truthfully their untrue answers will reveal their "low integrity". These respondents believe that the more candid they are in their answers, the higher their "integrity score" will be.

== In other disciplines ==
Disciplines and fields with an interest in integrity include philosophy of action, philosophy of medicine, mathematics, the mind, cognition, consciousness, materials science, structural engineering, and politics. Popular psychology identifies personal integrity, professional integrity, artistic integrity, and intellectual integrity.

For example, to behave with scientific integrity, a scientific investigation shouldn't determine the outcome in advance of the actual results. As an example of a breach of this principle, Public Health England, a UK Government agency, stated that they upheld a line of government policy in advance of the outcome of a study that they had commissioned.

The concept of integrity may also feature in business contexts that go beyond the issues of employee/employer honesty and ethical behavior, notably in marketing or branding contexts. Brand "integrity" gives a company's brand a consistent, unambiguous position in the mind of their audience. This is established for example via consistent messaging and a set of graphics standards to maintain visual integrity in marketing communications. Kaptein and Wempe developed a theory of corporate integrity that includes criteria for businesses dealing with moral dilemmas.

Another use of the term "integrity" appears in Michael Jensen's and Werner Erhard's paper, "Integrity: A Positive Model that Incorporates the Normative Phenomena of Morality, Ethics, and Legality". The authors model integrity as the state of being whole and complete, unbroken, unimpaired, sound, and in perfect condition. They posit a model of integrity that provides access to increased performance for individuals, groups, organizations, and societies. Their model "reveals the causal link between integrity and increased performance, quality of life, and value-creation for all entities, and provides access to that causal link." According to Muel Kaptein, integrity is not a one-dimensional concept. In his book he presents a multifaceted perspective of integrity. Integrity relates, for example, to compliance to the rules as well as to social expectations, to morality as well as to ethics, and to actions as well as to attitude.

Electronic signals are said to have integrity when there is no corruption of information between one domain and another, such as from a disk drive to a computer display. Such integrity is a fundamental principle of information assurance. Corrupted information is untrustworthy; uncorrupted information is of value.

== See also ==
- Authenticity (philosophy) – Concept in existential psychology and philosophy
- Bodily integrity – Human right to personal autonomy, self-ownership, and self-determination
- Consistency – Non-contradiction of a theory
- Data integrity – Maintenance of data over its entire life-cycle
- Digital integrity
- Doubt – Status between belief and disbelief
- Ethics – Philosophical study of morality
- Honesty – Moral quality of truthfulness
- Morality – Standard, doctrine or system of conduct
- Political hypocrisy – Discrepancy between a politicians' claims and practices
- Trikaranasuddhi – Sanskrit motto
