= V. S. Natarajan =

Indian career banker (1923–2013)

9th Chairman of State Bank of India
- In office 20 December 1982 – 30 January 1983
- Preceded by: P. C. D. Nambiar
- Succeeded by: R. P. Goyal

Personal details
- Born: c. 1923 Madras, Madras Presidency, British India (now Chennai, Tamil Nadu, India)
- Died: 9 January 2013 (aged 89–90) Chennai, Tamil Nadu, India
- Children: 3

V. S. Natarajan (1923 – 9 January 2013) was an Indian career banker who served as the 9th Chairman of State Bank of India.

== Personal life ==
He died on 9 January 2013 at his home in Boat Club Road in Chennai, just a few days before his 90th birthday surviving two daughters, a son, four grand children and a couple dozen great grand children.

== Career ==
He had joined the State Bank of India as a probationary officer in 1943 and served in a number of roles. He also served as the chief manager of the Thalassery branch in Kerala. He served as the ninth Chairman of State Bank of India from 20 December 1982 until 30 January 1983. After his retirement in 1983, he was succeeded by R. P. Goyal as the Chairman of State Bank of India. After having retired from the State Bank of India in 1983, he became a lifelong member of the Indian Institute of Banking and Finance.
