= Double standard =

Inconsistent application of principles

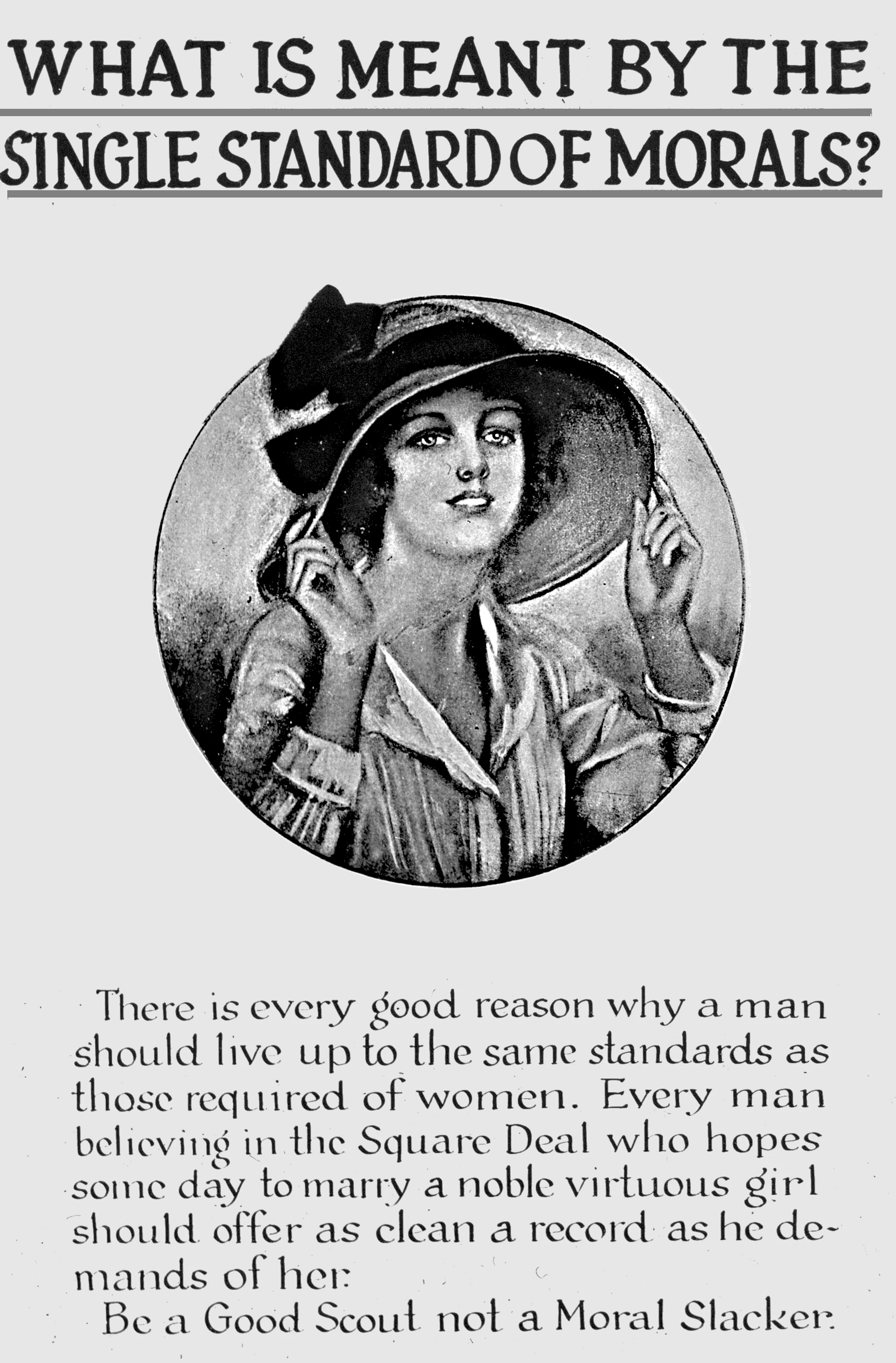
A poster from 1925 critiquing society's unequal expectations of men and women's sexuality

A double standard is the application of different sets of principles for situations that are, in principle, the same. It is often used to describe treatment whereby one group is given more latitude than another. A double standard arises when two or more people, groups, organizations, circumstances, or events are treated differently even though they should be treated the same way. A double standard "implies that two things which are the same are measured by different standards".

Applying different principles to similar situations may or may not indicate a double standard. To distinguish between the application of a double standard and a valid application of different standards toward circumstances that only appear to be the same, several factors must be examined. One is the sameness of those circumstances – what are the parallels between those circumstances, and in what ways do they differ? Another is the philosophy or belief system informing which principles should be applied to those circumstances. Different standards can be applied to situations that appear similar based on a qualifying truth or fact that, upon closer examination, renders those situations distinct (a physical reality or moral obligation, for example). However, if similar-looking situations have been treated according to different principles and there is no truth, fact, or principle that distinguishes those situations, then a double standard has been applied.

If correctly identified, a double standard usually indicates the presence of hypocrisy, bias, or unjust behaviors.

== Causes and explanations ==
Double standards are believed to develop in people's minds for a multitude of possible reasons, including: finding an excuse for oneself, emotions clouding judgement, twisting facts to support beliefs (such as confirmation biases, cognitive biases, attraction biases, prejudices, or the desire to be right). Human beings have a tendency to evaluate people's actions based on who did them.

In a study conducted in 2000, Dr. Martha Foschi observed the application of double standards in group competency tests. She concluded that status characteristics, such as gender, ethnicity, and socioeconomic class, can provide a basis for the formation of double standards in which stricter standards are applied to people who are perceived to be of lower status. Dr. Foschi also noted the ways in which double standards can form based on other socially valued attributes such as beauty, morality, and mental health.

Dr. Tristan Botelho and Dr. Mabel Abraham, Assistant Professors at the Yale School of Management and Columbia Business School, studied the effect that gender has on the way people rank others in financial markets. Their research showed that average-quality men were given the benefit of the doubt more than average-quality women, who were more often "penalized" in people's judgments. Botelho and Abraham also showed that women and men are similarly risk-loving, contrary to popular belief. Altogether, their research showed that double standards (at least in financial markets) do exist around gender. They encourage the adoption of controls to eliminate gender bias in application, hiring, and evaluation processes within organizations. Examples of such controls include using only initials on applications so that applicants' genders are not apparent, or auditioning musicians from behind a screen so that their skills, and not their gender, influence their acceptance or rejection into orchestras. Practices like these are, according to Botelho and Abraham, already being implemented in a number of organizations.

== Common areas ==
=== Gender ===
It has long been debated how someone's gender role affects others' moral, social, political, and legal responses. Some believe that differences in the way men and women are perceived and treated is a function of social norms, thus indicating a double standard. For example, one claim is that a double standard exists in society's judgment of women's and men's sexual conduct. Research has found that casual sexual activity is regarded as more acceptable for men than for women. According to William G Axinn, double standards between men and women can potentially exist with regard to: dating, cohabitation, virginity, marriage/remarriage, sexual abuse/assault/harassment, domestic violence, and singleness. It has also been argued that a double standard exists for shows of ambition and self-advancement: often considered a virtue for men, it is seen as vicious and unnatural for women.

Kennair et al. (2023) found no signs of a sexual double standard in long- or short-term mating contexts, nor in choosing a friend. They did find that women's self-stimulation was judged positively, and men's self-stimulation was judged negatively. A 2017 study of American college students also found no evidence of a gendered double standard around promiscuity.

=== Law ===
A double standard may arise if two or more groups who have equal legal rights are given different degrees of legal protection or representation. Such double standards are seen as unjustified because they violate a common maxim of modern legal jurisprudence - that all parties should stand equal before the law. Where judges are expected to be impartial, they must apply the same standards to all people, regardless of their own subjective biases or favoritism, based on: social class, rank, ethnicity, gender, sexual orientation, religion, age, or other distinctions.

=== Politics ===
A double standard arises in politics when the treatment of the same political matters between two or more parties (such as the response to a public crisis or the allocation of funding) is handled differently.

Double standard policies can include situations when a country's or commentator's assessment of the same phenomenon, process, or event in international relations depends on their relationship with or attitude to the parties involved. In Harry's Game (1975), Gerald Seymour wrote: "One man's terrorist is another man's freedom fighter".

=== Ethnicity ===
Double standards exist when people are preferred or rejected based on their ethnicity in situations in which ethnicity is not a relevant or justifiable factor for discrimination (as might be the case for a cultural performance or ethnic ceremony).

The intentional efforts of some people to counteract racism and ethnic double standards can sometimes be interpreted by others as actually perpetuating racism and double standards among ethnic groups. Writing for The American Conservative, Rod Dreher quotes the account published in Quillette by Coleman Hughes, a black student at Columbia University, who said he was given an opportunity to play in a backup band for Grammy Award-winning pop artist Rihanna at the 2016 MTV Video Music Awards Show. According to Hughes, several of his friends were also invited; however, one of them was fired and replaced because, according to Hughes, his white Hispanic background did not suit the all-black aesthetic that Rihanna's team had chosen for her show. The team had decided that all performers on stage were to be black, aside from Rihanna's regular guitar player. Hughes was uncertain about whether he believed this action was unethical, given that the show was racially themed to begin with. He observed what he believed to be a double standard in the entertainment industry, saying, "if a black musician had been fired in order to achieve an all-white aesthetic — it would have made front page headlines. It would have been seen as an unambiguous moral infraction." Dreher argues that Hughes's observations highlight the difficulty in distinguishing between the exclusion of one ethnic group to celebrate another, and the exclusion of an ethnic group as the exercise of racism or a double standard. Dreher also discussed another incident, in which New York Times columnist Bari Weiss, who is Jewish, was heavily criticized for tweeting, "Immigrants: They get the job done", in a positive reference to Mirai Nagasu, a Japanese-American Olympic ice skater, who Weiss was trying to honor. The Harvard University Presidential Task Force on Combating Antisemitism and Anti-Israel Bias found that some Jewish students perceived dismissals of their reported experiences of antisemitism as reflecting a double standard within campus anti-bias frameworks that otherwise prioritize lived experience and discriminatory impact. The public debate about ethnicity and double standards remains controversial and, by all appearances, will continue.

== See also ==
- Discrimination
- Double bind
- Doublethink
- Golden Rule or ethic of reciprocity
- Honne and tatemae
- Hypocrisy
- In-group and out-group
- In-group favoritism
- Naeronambul
- Nordic sexual morality debate
- Political hypocrisy
- Quod licet Iovi, non licet bovi
- Psychological projection
- Reciprocity (social and political philosophy)
- Social exclusion
