= The Arunachal Times =

English-language daily newspaper in Arunachal Pradesh, India

- Type: Daily newspaper
- Format: Broadsheet
- Owner: The Arunachal Times Publications Pvt. Ltd.
- Founder: Vijay Kumar Nath
- Associate editor: Tongam Rina
- Founded: June 6, 1989; 37 years ago
- Language: English
- Headquarters: Itanagar, Arunachal Pradesh, India
- City: Itanagar
- Country: India
- RNI: 40909
- Website: arunachaltimes.in

The Arunachal Times is an English-language daily newspaper published from Itanagar, the capital of Arunachal Pradesh, India. First published on 6 June 1989, it was the first broadsheet English-language daily in the state and is regarded as one of Arunachal Pradesh's principal dailies.

== History ==
The Arunachal Times was launched on 6 June 1989 as the first broadsheet English-language daily of Arunachal Pradesh, and it was inaugurated by the Chief Minister, Gegong Apang, at the Naharlagun industrial estate. The paper was set up by Vijay Kumar Nath and was run by him before being taken over by The Arunachal Times Publications Pvt. Ltd., its present owner. Nath served as its chief editor and Taso Grayu as editor-cum-publisher, and Nath became editor in December 2003. The newspaper then moved from letterpress to offset printing in 1996 and adopted web offset printing in December 2008.

== Coverage and standing ==
Mass Media in India lists The Arunachal Times among the principal dailies of the state, and the Registrar of Newspapers for India's Press in India records it as a daily published from Arunachal Pradesh. Scholarship on India-China relations has cited the newspaper's editorial positions on border and strategic questions between the two countries. In 2014 and 2015, it received the second largest volume of advertising payments from the central Ministry of Information and Broadcasting among newspapers in Arunachal Pradesh.

The paper's associate editor, Tongam Rina, had also been the target of threats and violence in connection with her investigative reporting. On 15 July 2012, unidentified gunmen shot and critically injured Rina outside the newspaper's Itanagar office, an attack which followed the ransacking of the office earlier that year.
