= M. S. Verma =

Indian career banker

17th chairman of State Bank of India
- Preceded by: P. G. Kakodkar
- Succeeded by: M. P. Radhakrishnan

Maya Shankar Verma was an Indian career banker who served as the seventeenth Chairman of the State Bank of India. He had also served as the Chairman of TRAI.

== Life and education ==
He held a master's degree in art and was a certified associate of the Indian Institute of Banking and Finance.

He also held an M.Phil. degree from Patna University.

== Banking career ==
He joined the State Bank of India as a probationary officer in 1956. He served in various roles until he became the seventeenth Chairman of the State Bank of India from April 1, 1997, to September 30, 1998.

After his retirement in 1998, M. P. Radhakrishnan succeeded him as chairman of the State Bank of India.

== Later career ==
Upon retiring in 1998, he was appointed chairman of the Telecom Regulatory Authority of India on March 23, 2000.

He also served as an honorary advisor to the Reserve Bank of India.

He served as the international chairman of SREI Infrastructure Finance Limited.
