= Norcot Warren =

Irish banker

- Born: June 4, 1864; Galway, Ireland
- Died: April 23, 1947 (aged 82); Kingswear, Devon
- Occupation: Banker
- Known for: Managing Governor of the Imperial Bank of India from 1921 to 1927
- Spouse: Mabel Augusta Peters (m. 1893)
- Children: 3

Sir Norcot Hastings Yeeles Warren KCIE (4 June 1864 – 23 April 1947) was an Irish banker who served as the Managing Governor of the Imperial Bank of India from 1921 to 1927. He also served as the President of the Indian Institute of Bankers.

== Early life ==
Norcot Warren was born in Galway, Ireland, the son of Augustus Offer Warren and Martha Hopkins. He went to India in 1885 where he secured employment as a clerk in the Bank of Bengal.

== Career ==
Joining the Bank of Bengal as a clerk in 1885, Warren rose to become its Secretary and Treasurer. When the Imperial Bank of India was formed on 27 January 1921 by the merger of the three presidency banks – the Bank of Bengal, Bank of Bombay and Bank of Madras, Warren became its first Managing-Governor. As head of the Imperial Bank of India, Warren was instrumental in the founding of the Indian Institute of Bankers and served as its first President in 1928. He resigned in 1928 and returned to England.

== Honours ==
Warren was made a Knights Bachelor in 1917. He was subsequently made a Knight Commander of the Order of the Indian Empire in the 1922 New Year Honours list.

== Personal life ==
Norcot Warren married Mabel Peters on 26 December 1893 in Chhindwara, British India. While in India, they had a daughter, Kathleen Claude Warren, born in 1894, and a son, Francis Patrick Sutherland Warren, born in 1901 followed by a son Theodore Egerton Nicholson "Toby" Warren born in 1910.

He died in Kingswear, Devon, aged 83.
