= Goa Human Rights Commission =

- Type: Non-profit

The Goa Human Rights Commission was constituted in March 2011 to perform the functions assigned to the State Commission under Chapter V of the Protection of Human Rights Act 1993. The current Chairman of the Commission is Justice Utkarsh V. Bakre, a former High Court judge.

== History ==
Justice Shri Prafulla Kumar Mishra, former Chief Justice of Patna High Court, was appointed as the first Chairperson of the Commission with Shri. A. D. Salkar, former district judge, and Shri J. A. Keny, former Member of the Goa Public Service Commission, as members. The office of the commission is located in Panaji, Goa. The website of the Goa Human Rights Commission was made in January 2015.

Initially the Commission functioned from the premises provided by the Goa Public Service Commission, while hearings were held at the State Guest House at Altinho, Panaji. Currently, the Commission is housed at 1st Floor, Old Directorate of Education Building, 18th June Road, Panaji- Goa.

== Appointment of chairperson and other members of State Commission ==
The Chairperson and other Members shall be appointed by the Governor by warrant under his hand and seal provided that every appointment shall be made after obtaining the recommendation of a Committee consisting of -

- The Chief Minister - Chairperson
- Speaker of the Legislative Assembly - Member
- Ministers in-charge of the Department of Home in that State - Member
- Leader of the Opposition in the legislative Assembly – Member

== Powers of the Commission ==
The Powers of the Commission are as follows-

- To inquire, suo motu or on a petition presented to it by a victim or any person on his behalf, into complaint of-

(i) violation of human rights or abetment thereof; or
(ii) negligence in the prevention of such violation, by a public servant

- To intervene in any proceeding involving any allegation of violation of human rights pending before a court with the approval of such court
- To visit, under intimation to the State Government, any jail or any other institution under the control of the State Government, where persons are detained or lodged for purposes of treatment, reformation or protection to study the living conditions of the inmates and make recommendations thereon
- To review the safeguards provided by or under the Constitution or any law for the time being in force for the protection of human rights and recommend measures for their effective implementation
- To review the factors, including acts of terrorism that inhibit the enjoyment of human rights and recommend appropriate remedial measures
- To undertake and promote research in the field of human rights
- To spread human rights literacy among various sections of society and promote awareness of the safeguards available for the protection of these rights through publications, the media, seminars and other available means;
- To encourage the efforts of non-governmental organisations and institutions working in the field of human rights;
- Such other functions as it may consider necessary for the promotion of human rights
