= Pratip Chaudhuri =

Indian banker (born 1953

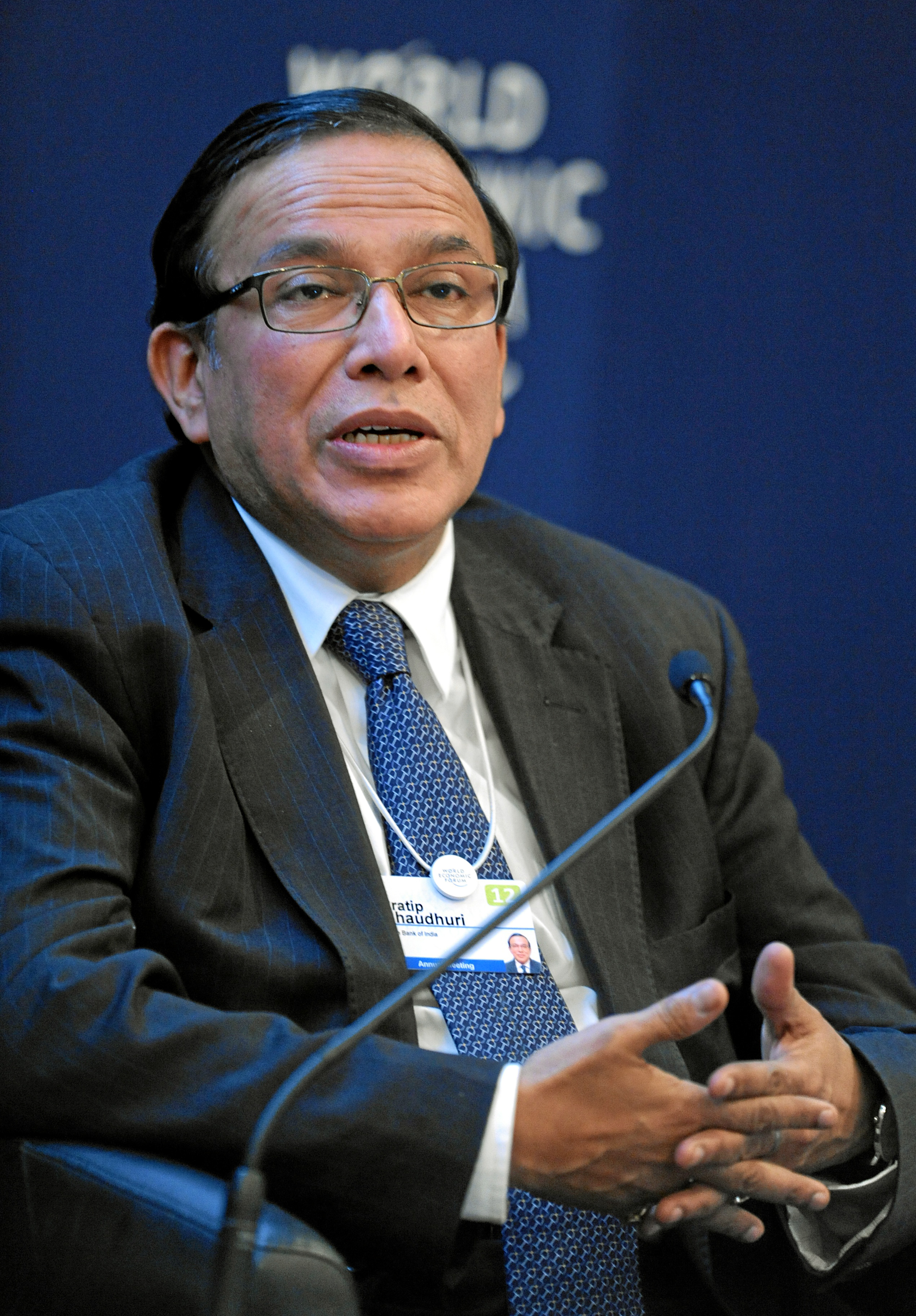
- Chaudhuri during the WEF 2012

23rd Chairman of State Bank of India
- Preceded by: O. P. Bhatt
- Succeeded by: Arundhati Bhattacharya

Pratip Chaudhuri (born 1953) is an Indian banker. An alumnus of the 1974 batch of University Business School - Chandigarh, he is a former chairman of State Bank of India. He took charge from O. P. Bhatt, on 7 April 2011 and retired on 30 September 2013. Prior to that he was the Deputy Managing Director (DMD) of the International Division of SBI.

He joined the State Bank of India as a probationary officer in 1974.

He has held several important positions in SBI including Chief General Manager of Chennai Circle. He is also credited with the merger of State Bank of Saurashtra in 2008, where he was a director. He has one daughter and one son. He was arrested on 31 October 2021 for selling property as throwaway price to one company and he joined same company after retirement. Now he was out of jail on prior bail.
