= Naeronambul =

Korean for 'double standards'

Naeronambul is a Korean term for 'double standards' ( The dictionary definition of 내로남불 at Wiktionary), constructed as an abbreviation for "romance if I do it, affair if others do it", which is usually used to make political criticism. The term is used to assess oneself and the other party with double standards. While the expression romance is considered perfectly normal and personal, affair makes a person with a family to be socially criticized for having a secret relationship with another person. In other words, by lowering moral standards for one's actions and raising moral standards for the other or the enemy, one's actions require freedom and choice to others, and strict compliance with the law. It is similar in meaning to the act of eating out in the Bible, "Watch out for the Pharisees".

== Political meaning ==
In party politics, one party's policy decision is used as a critical expression when it is seen as inappropriate for the other party. In particular, the ruling party's policy calls for the people to follow the law, but the ruling party itself uses it sarcastically when it takes the opposite course of action. In fact, used when government criticised the government.
