= T. R. Varadachary =

Indian banker

7th Chairman of State Bank of India
- Preceded by: Raj Kumar Talwar
- Succeeded by: P. C. D. Nambiar

T. R. Varadachary was an Indian career banker who served as the seventh Chairman of State Bank of India.

== Career ==
=== Early career ===
He was a long time member of the Indian Banks' Association. His most notable achievement was the 1977 Final Report of the Working Group on Customer Service in Banks which played a major role in improving the customer service in Indian banks.

He also served as the Vice President of the Indian Institute of Banking and Finance from 1976 to 1977.

=== Banking career ===
He served as the seventh Chairman of State Bank of India from August 1976 until April 1977.

He served as Chairman of State Bank of India for just 269 days and had one of the shortest stints at the post.

== Controversies ==
He is notable for the acrimonious circumstances in which his predecessor Raj Kumar Talwar was replaced from his office. A report published in the India Today magazine claimed that T. R. Varadachary paid bribes to Indian politicians in order to become the Chairman of State Bank of India.

T. R. Varadachary's appointment as the Chairman of State Bank of India later became the subject of a major court case and was reported on by all the major Indian newspapers.
