= Burra Venkatappaiah =

Indian banker

4th Chairman of State Bank of India
- Preceded by: P. C. Bhattacharya
- Succeeded by: V. T. Dehejia

Burra Venkatappaiah was an Indian banker and was the Chairman of State Bank of India from March 1962 until February 1965.

He was also a career civil servant and a former deputy governor at the Reserve Bank of India.

== Early career ==
He joined the Imperial Civil Service in 1932 and served in a variety of roles in the Bombay State secretariat.

Prior to becoming the chairman of the State Bank of India, he served as the Deputy Governor of the Reserve Bank of India.

During his time at the Reserve Bank of India, he played a key role in the drive towards the nationalization of the Imperial Bank of India, as a result of which the State Bank of India was formed.

== Banking career ==
He served as the Chairman of State Bank of India from March 1962 until February 1965.

During his tenure, at the State Bank of India, there was substantial growth in rural and agricultural credit and banking.

He also headed the All India Rural Credit Survey Committee in 1954 (it came to be known as the Gorwala committee), which made several recommendations to expand bank credit towards the rural and agricultural sector.

== Legacy ==
B. Venkatappiah played a key role in the documentation of the bank's history. Under his aegis, a separate Historical Research Department was set up at the Bank's Head Office at Mumbai. Several historical researchers worked at the department. As a result, a multi-volume historical treatise Evolution and History of the State Bank of India was published.

It was also during his tenure on 1 February 1965, that Hyderabad Circle was carved out of the erstwhile Madras Circle, in order to cater to the customers of Telangana and Andhra Pradesh.

He has also served as a board member at the Institute of Public Enterprise, an educational institute in Hyderabad.
