= Arun Kumar Purwar =

- The President, Dr. A.P.J. Abdul Kalam releasing State Bank of India Bicentennial Commemorative Coin, in New Delhi on May 30, 2006. The Union Finance Minister, Shri P. Chidambaram and the Chairman of SBI, Shri A.K. Purwar are also seen.

21st Chairman of State Bank of India
- Preceded by: Janki Vallabh
- Succeeded by: O. P. Bhatt

Personal details
- Born: 14 May 1946 (age 79)

Arun Kumar Purwar, also known as A. K. Purwar, became the Chairman of State Bank of India in 2002, during his tenure from 1968 to 2006. He joined the bank as an officer on January 3, 1968. His father's name is Anant Ram Purwar. With a master's degree in commerce from Allahabad University, in 1966, he was previously a lecturer in their Business Administration Department. After joining SBI, he appeared for departmental examinations, like CAIIB, a very tough examination, and stood third in the country.

== Career ==
In 1991, he was posted to Tokyo by SBI. McKinsey & Company was engaged by State Bank of India, during his times for introduction of world-class processes and best practices, such as centralized credit processes in 83 cities, upgradation and computerization of the entire currency administration, upgradation of the pension administration system, and introduction of core banking in 2700 branches, with centralized back-end processing in 300 cities.

Under Purwar, McKinsey, improved SBI agricultural lending, with creation of an agri-business unit in Mumbai, where micro-finance and contract farming, led to agriculture lending growth by 40%.

He also chairs the Federation of Indian Chambers of Commerce and Industry (FICCI) Diaspora Division.

His profile has a plethora of key financial positions which can be viewed at Zauba Corp.

== See also ==
- List of chairpersons of the State Bank of India
