= Afroz Shah =

Indian environmental activist and lawyer

- Born: Afroz Shah; Mumbai, India
- Occupations: Environmental activist, lawyer

Afroz Shah is an Indian environmental activist and lawyer from Mumbai. He is best known for organizing the world's largest beach clean-up. Versova Beach.

Shah partnered with the Dawoodi Bohra's Turning the Tide campaign to remove plastic from the Mithi river and Dana Pani beach in Mumbai. Inspired by Afroz Shah's effort to clean beaches in Mumbai, the United Nations Environment Program launched the Clean Seas campaign globally. In 2019, Shah was listed as one of CNN's Top 10 Heroes of the Year.

- United Nations Champions of the Earth 2016
- CNN-News18 Indian of the Year 2017
- CNN named him amongst its list of Top 10 Heroes of Year 2019
- GQ awarded the trophy for Eco Warrior of the Year 2019

PM of India Narendra Modi praised Shah's work for transforming Versova beach from filth and garbage to clean and beautiful during his radio programme 'Mann ki Baat' on 28 May 2017.
