= Prafulla Kumar Mishra =

Indian judge

Prafulla Kumar Mishra or P. K. Misra (born 17 September 1947) is a retired Indian judge, former Chief Justice of Patna High Court and present Lokayukta for Goa.

== Career ==
Mishra was born in 1947. His father, late Jaya Krishna Mishra was also a judge. He passed LL.B. with gold medal from the Utkal University in 1968. Mishra became the additional judge of Orissa High Court on 17 January 1996. In 2001 he was transferred to the Madras High Court. On 12 August 2009 he was elevated in the post of the Chief Justice of Patna High Court. Justice Mishra was retired on 16 September 2009 from the Judgeship. After the retirement he became the first Chairman of Goa Human Rights Commission. In April 2016 Mishra was appointed as Goa Lokayukta after Justice B. Sudarshan Reddy.
