= Challa Sreenivasulu Setty =

Indian banker

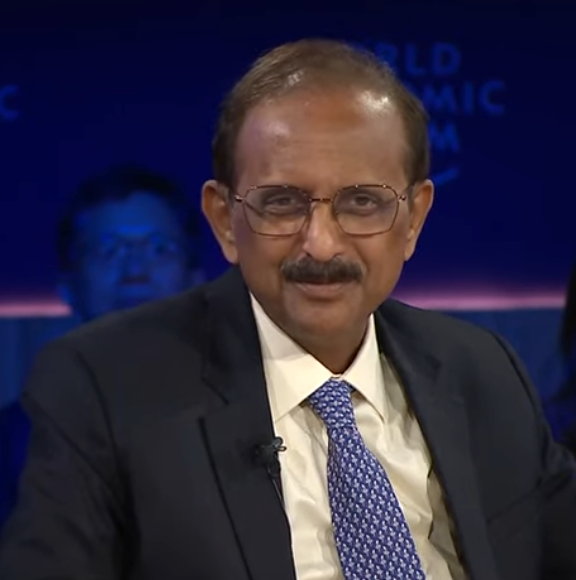
- At the WEF Annual Meeting in 2025

27th Chairman of State Bank of India
- Incumbent
- Assumed office 28 August 2024
- Preceded by: Dinesh Kumar Khara

Personal details
- Born: 26 September 1965 (age 61) Pedda Pothulapadu, Manopad Mandal, Jogulamba Gadwal district, Telangana, India
- Education: Acharya N. G. Ranga Agricultural University (BSc); Indian Institute of Banking and Finance

Challa Sreenivasulu Setty (born 26 September 1965), also known as C. S. Setty, is a banker and the current chairman of State Bank of India, India's largest public sector bank.

== Early life and education ==
Setty was born on 26 September 1965 in a Telugu family. He was born in Manopad mandal Peddapothulapadu village in the Jogulamba Gadwal district of Telangana state.

He completed his schooling in government schools. Later, he earned his Bachelor of Science degree in agriculture from the Acharya N. G. Ranga Agricultural University (ANGRAU).

== Career ==
He began his career at the State Bank of India in 1988 as a probationary officer. He started his banking career with an assignment at the Bardoli, Surat branch of the State Bank of India in 1988.

He is also a certified associate of the Indian Institute of Bankers.

As one of the managing directors, he looked after international banking, global markets, and technology verticals before succeeding Dinesh Kumar Khara as the 27th chairman of State Bank of India. As of 2024, he had served over 35 years at various levels in the State Bank of India.

=== Chairmanship ===
His leadership style is characterized by his proactive approach to understanding customer needs. He is known for frequently engaging with retail customers to gather feedback on their service experiences, pain points, and suggestions for improvement. This hands-on approach reflects his dedication to enhancing customer satisfaction and driving continuous improvement within the bank.

== See also ==
- State Bank of India
- List of chairpersons of the State Bank of India
