= Christianity in Arunachal Pradesh =

Religion within the Indian state

Christianity is the dominant religion in the Northeastern Indian state of Arunachal Pradesh, which borders China. According to the census of 2011 Christians constitute 30.26% of the state's population. Christians in Arunachal Pradesh belong to a variety of denominations. The Roman Catholic Church is the largest individual denomination in the state with around 180,000 adherents. The Arunachal Baptist Church Council is the second largest denomination with 150,000 baptized members in about 1,200 churches and Arunachal Pradesh Christian Revival Church Council (APCRCC) which was started in 1987 at Naharlagun also growing fast.

The state belongs to the area of the diocese of North East India of the Church of North India. Baptists were the first to start missionary work in the region, as early as 1836. The Presbyterian Church has been active in missionary work since 1984, and the United Pentecostal Church North-East India since 1989. The Roman Catholic Diocese of Itanagar and the Roman Catholic Diocese of Miao have their seat in the state. The state is an area of rapid growth of Roman Catholicism in recent years.

Among the Christians in the state there is a literacy rate higher than the rate in the state population at large.

Religion in Arunachal Pradesh
religion	percent
Christianity	30.2%
Hinduism	29.4%
Others (mostly Donyi-Polo)	26.2%
Buddhism	11.7%
Islam	1.9%
Sikhism	0.1%
Jainism	0.1%

Although the state has prohibited bribery or coercion for conversion since 1978, but it has not been implemented yet.

== Demography ==
Christians in Arunachal Pradesh
Year	Number	Percentage
2001	205,548	18.72
2011	418,732	30.26

Historical Christian Population in Arunachal Pradesh
Year	Pop.	±%
1971	3,684	—
1981	27,306	+641.2%
1991	89,013	+226.0%
2001	205,548	+130.9%
2011	418,732	+103.7%
Source: census of India

=== Trends ===
Percentage of Christians in Arunachal Pradesh by decades

Year	Percent	Increase
1971	0.79%	-
1981	4.32%	+3.53%
1991	10.3%	+5.98%
2001	18.72%	+8.42%
2011	30.26%	+11.54%

=== Tribes ===
Percentage of Christians in the Scheduled Tribes

Tribe	Christians	Percent
Nyishi	180,609	63.3%
Adi	65,691	27.60%
Wancho	54,165	95.22%
Nocte	23,093	66.62%
Tangsa	21,291	58.95%
Apatani	9,513	21.73%
Tagin	7,634	12.13%
Miji	3,419	42.07%
Yobin	2,965	99.03%
Aka	2,788	34.38%
Sulung	2,085	46.14%
Mishmi	1,864	4.24%

== See also ==
- Arunachal Baptist Church Council
- Arunachal church burnings, 1968–1978
- Christian Revival Church
- Christianity in India
- List of Christian denominations in North East India
- Religion in Arunachal Pradesh
