= M. P. Radhakrishnan =

Indian career banker

18th Chairman of State Bank of India
- Preceded by: M. S. Verma
- Succeeded by: G. G. Vaidya

M. P. Radhakrishnan was an Indian career banker who served as the eighteenth Chairman of State Bank of India.

== Career ==
He joined the State Bank of India as a probationary officer in September 1964 and served in a number of roles until finally becoming the Chairman of State Bank of India in 1998.

He served as the eighteenth Chairman of State Bank of India from 1 December 1998 until 31 January 1999. He was succeeded by G. G. Vaidya after his retirement in 1999.
