= V. T. Dehejia =

5th Chairman of State Bank of India
- Preceded by: Borra Venkatappaiah
- Succeeded by: Raj Kumar Talwar

V. T. Dehejia was an Indian career civil servant and bank executive. He is most notable for having served as the fifth Chairman of State Bank of India.

== Career ==
=== Early career ===
Dehejia was one of the early recipients of the Jamsetjee Nusserwanjee Tata Scholarship established in 1892. He was known for being an outstanding scholar in his school days and achieved many laurels.

=== Civil Service ===
Dehejia joined the Imperial Civil Service before India's independence in 1947.

Dehejia was the district collector of Ahmednagar district in Maharashtra from 27 April 1935 to 7 December 1935.

Dehejia has also served in the post of secretary to the Ministry of Finance (India).

=== Banking career ===
Dehejia served as the fifth Chairman of State Bank of India from March 1965 until February 1969.

After his retirement in 1990, he was succeeded by Raj Kumar Talwar as the Chairman of State Bank of India. Raj Kumar Talwar went on to have one of the longest tenures of any Chairman of the State Bank of India

During his tenure, The National Credit Council (NCC) was established in October 1968, to estimate the credit requirements in Indian trade and industry. The committee came to be known as the Dehejia Committee and made several important recommendations on working capital estimation.

== Legacy ==
V. T. Dehejia is notable for being one of the last members of the Imperial Civil Service to serve as Chairman of State Bank of India. After him, all the future Chairmen of State Bank of India were either career bankers or were sourced from the Indian Administrative Service.
