= Vishwanath N. Nadkarni =

Indian career banker

11th Chairman of State Bank of India
- Preceded by: R. P. Goyal
- Succeeded by: D. N. Ghosh

Personal details
- Born: 28 July 1924
- Died: 3 August 2006 (aged 82) Mumbai

Vishwanath N. Nadkarni was an Indian career banker who served as the eleventh Chairman of State Bank of India.

== Life ==
He was born on 28 July 1924.

He died on 3 August 2006 at the age of 82 at his home in Mumbai. His obituary was published by The Times of India the very next day after his death.

He is survived by one daughter, two sons, five grand children and a couple dozen great grand children.

== Career ==
=== Early career ===
He had joined the State Bank of India as a probationary officer and served in a number of roles until finally becoming the Chairman of State Bank of India in 1983.

=== Banking career ===
He served as the eleventh Chairman of State Bank of India from 1 December 1983 until 27 July 1984.

After his retirement in 1984, he was succeeded by D. N. Ghosh as the Chairman of State Bank of India.

=== Later career ===
After having retired from the State Bank of India in 1984, he lived quietly at his home until his death in 2006. He is notable for being one of the few Chairmen of the State Bank of India who never took up any post retirement assignments in the private sector.
