= M. N. Goiporia =

Indian career banker

14th chairman of the State Bank of India
- Preceded by: Atal V.
- Succeeded by: Dipankar Basu

M. N. Goiporia was an Indian career banker who was the 14th chairman of the State Bank of India.

== Career ==
He joined the Central Bank of India as a probationary officer and worked in a number of roles until becoming the 14th chairman of State Bank of India, a position he held from 19 February 1990 until 31 July 1992.

Following the 1992 Indian stock market scam, Goiporia was asked by the Indian government to step down from his role as and was replaced by Dipankar Basu.

He was the chairman of the Goiporia Committee, which made several important recommendations to improve the level of customer service in Indian banks. As a result of the committee's recommendations, all Indian banks are required to maintain a customer complaint book with adequate pages for recording complaints.

== Legacy ==
Today, he is largely remembered for his role in 1992 Indian stock market scam. The State Bank of India was involved in the scam and several allegations were made against Goiporia, who was the then chairman.

In Scam 1992: The Harshad Mehta Story, a documentary film chronicling the 1992 scam, the role of Goiporia was played by the Indian actor Vivek Vaswani.
