= D. N. Ghosh =

Indian career bureaucrat and civil servant

Dhruba Narayan Ghosh

12th Chairman of State Bank of India
- Preceded by: Vishwanath N. Nadkarni
- Succeeded by: Atal V.

Personal details
- Born: 6 August 1928 Cooch Behar
- Died: 7 November 2023 (aged 95) Kolkata, India

Dhruba Narayan Ghosh was an Indian career bureaucrat and civil servant who served as the twelfth Chairman of State Bank of India. He was also the founder and first chairman of the ICRA Limited.

== Life ==
He was born on 6 August 1928 in Cooch Behar, India.

He died on 07 November 2023 in Kolkata, India.

Most of the details about his early life are known from his autobiography No Regrets published by Rupa Publications on 1 August 2015. The book was released by Arundhati Bhattacharya, the then Chairman of State Bank of India and Deepak Parekh, chairman of the Housing Development Finance Corporation on 27 August 2015.

== Education ==
He spent his formative years in Presidency College, Calcutta, where he completed his BA and MA degrees in economics.

He holds a Master's degree in Economics from the University of Calcutta.

== Career ==
=== Early career ===
He joined the Indian Audit and Accounts Service in 1952 and worked in a number of roles. He played a key role in the nationalization of Indian banks.

A large chunk of his civil service years were spent in the banking division (later department) of the Union finance ministry as a key official who helped draft laws that led up to bank nationalisation and thereafter to a supervisory structure for public sector banks.

— Business Standard

=== Banking career ===
He served as the twelfth Chairman of State Bank of India from 13 May 1985 until 12 May 1989.

After his retirement from the State Bank of India in 1989, he was succeeded by Atal V. as the Chairman of State Bank of India.

It was during his time at the State Bank of India, that the drive towards computerization of branches was begun. The State Bank of India was also rated by the international rating agency the S&P Global Ratings for the first time during his tenure.

=== Later career ===
After having retired from the State Bank of India in 1989, he held a number of executive posts in the private sector which included:

- Member of Board of Directors of Philips company
- Member of Board of Directors of Larsen & Toubro company
- Chairman of the Board of Governors of the Indian Institute of Management Lucknow
- Chairman of the board of Sundaram BNP Paribas Asset Management Company Limited
- Chairman of the board of Gerdau Steel India Limited
- Chairman of the Management Development Institute, Gurgaon
- Chairman and Director of The Peerless General Finance and Investment Company Limited
- Managing Director of Damodar Cement and Slag Limited
- Independent Non-Executive Director of Birla Corporation Limited
- Independent Director of Housing Development Finance Corporation.
- Director of Tata Global Beverages Limited.

He has also served as the president of the Society for the Preservation of Satyajit Ray Archives.

In 1991, he became the Managing Trustee of the Sameeksha Trust, which is the publisher of Economic and Political Weekly.
