= Pran Nath Luthra =

Indian Administrative Service Officer

- Born: 1917; India
- Died: 2000 (aged 82–83); India
- Occupations: Civil service officer, writer
- Known for: Rehabilitation of refugees in the Northeast India and writings
- Awards: 1972 Padma Bhushan

Pran Nath Luthra (1917–2000) was an Indian civil service officer and writer, best known for his services for the rehabilitation of the refugees in the Northeast India and his writings on his days of service. He was an adviser to the Governor of Assam and an additional secretary at the Ministry of Labour and Rehabilitation of the Government of West Bengal. The Government of India awarded him the Padma Bhushan, the third highest civilian award, in 1972.

== Biography ==
Pran Luthra was born in 1917. He joined the Indian Army in 1939 and became a lieutenant colonel when he was drafted into the Indian Frontier Administrative Service in 1955 as one of its first batch of officers. He worked at the north-east frontiers till 1960 during which time he served as the special officer of the Ministry of External Affairs in 1956, as the commissioner of Nagaland during 1957–60 and as the officer on special duty with the Border Roads Development Board (present-day Border Roads Organisation) until 1963. His next move was to Dispur as and adviser to the Governor of Assam, a position he held until April 1971 when he was appointed as the additional secretary at the Ministry of Labour and Rehabilitation of the Government of West Bengal where he stayed till his retirement from official service in March 1973.

Luthra was the author of a number of books, most of them detailing his experiences during his civil service. Rehabilitation, Constitutional and administrative growth of the North-East Frontier Agency, Nagaland from a district to a state, Democracy in NEFA, Constitutional and administrative growth of Arunachal Pradesh, Problems of Bangladesh refugee influx and emerging lessons for administration, and Encyclopaedia of social work in India are some his notable works. The Government of India awarded Luthra the third highest civilian honor of the Padma Bhushan in 1972.

Luthra, who was married to Indira Seth, died in 2000. at the age 87.

== See also ==
- North-East Frontier Agency
