= Dipankar Basu =

Indian career banker (1935–2018)

15th Chairman of State Bank of India
- Preceded by: M. N. Goiporia
- Succeeded by: P. G. Kakodkar

Personal details
- Born: 10 August 1935 Kolkata
- Died: 15 February 2018 (aged 82) Kolkata

Dipankar Basu was an Indian career banker who served as the fifteenth Chairman of the State Bank of India.

== Life ==
He was born on 10 August 1935.

He was born and raised in the Indian city of Kolkata.

He died on 15 February 2018 in Kolkata.

== Education ==
He held a master's degree in Economics from Delhi University.

== Career ==
=== Early career ===
He joined the State Bank of India as a probationary officer in 1956 and served in a number of roles until finally becoming the Chairman of State Bank of India in 1993.

=== Banking career ===
He served as the fifteenth Chairman of State Bank of India from 25 February 1993 until 31 August 1995.

He was largely responsible for the bank's entry into the investment banking and mutual fund businesses and was instrumental in setting up SBI Capital Markets Ltd. and SBI Mutual Fund.

After his retirement in 1995, he was succeeded by P. G. Kakodkar as the Chairman of the State Bank of India.

=== Later career ===
After having retired from the State Bank of India in 1995, he was appointed as the non-executive chairman of the Sun Foreign & Colonial Asset Management, which is currently a subsidiary of the Principal Financial Group.

He was nominated by the Securities and Exchange Board of India to serve as a director of the Calcutta Stock Exchange.
