= P. C. D. Nambiar =

Indian career banker

8th Chairman of State Bank of India
- Preceded by: T. R. Varadachary
- Succeeded by: V. S. Natarajan

Personal details
- Born: P.C Damodaran Nambiar Kuthuparamba, Kannur, Kerala, India.
- Died: 27 May 2012
- Parent(s): Dr. Krishnan Nambiar(Father), P.C Madhavi Amma(Mother)

P. C. D. Nambiar was an Indian career banker who served as the eighth Chairman of State Bank of India.

== Life ==
He was born and raised in Kuthuparamba, Kerala, to Dr. Krishnan Nambiar and P.C. Madhavi Amma, and later moved to Chennai, Tamil Nadu.

He died on 28 May 2012 in Chennai.

== Career ==
=== Early career ===
He has joined the State Bank of India as a probationary officer and served in a number of roles. He also served as the chief manager of the Thalassery branch in Kerala.

=== Banking career ===
He served as the eighth Chairman of State Bank of India from 23 May 1977 until 13 December 1982.

After his retirement in 1982, he was succeeded by V. S. Natarajan as the Chairman of State Bank of India.

=== Later career ===
After having retired from the State Bank of India in 1982, he was appointed as a director and board member at many private companies including Reliance Industries and Western India Plywood Limited.

He also served as vice-chairman of the now defunct Dubai Bank.
