= Dinesh Kumar Khara =

Indian banker

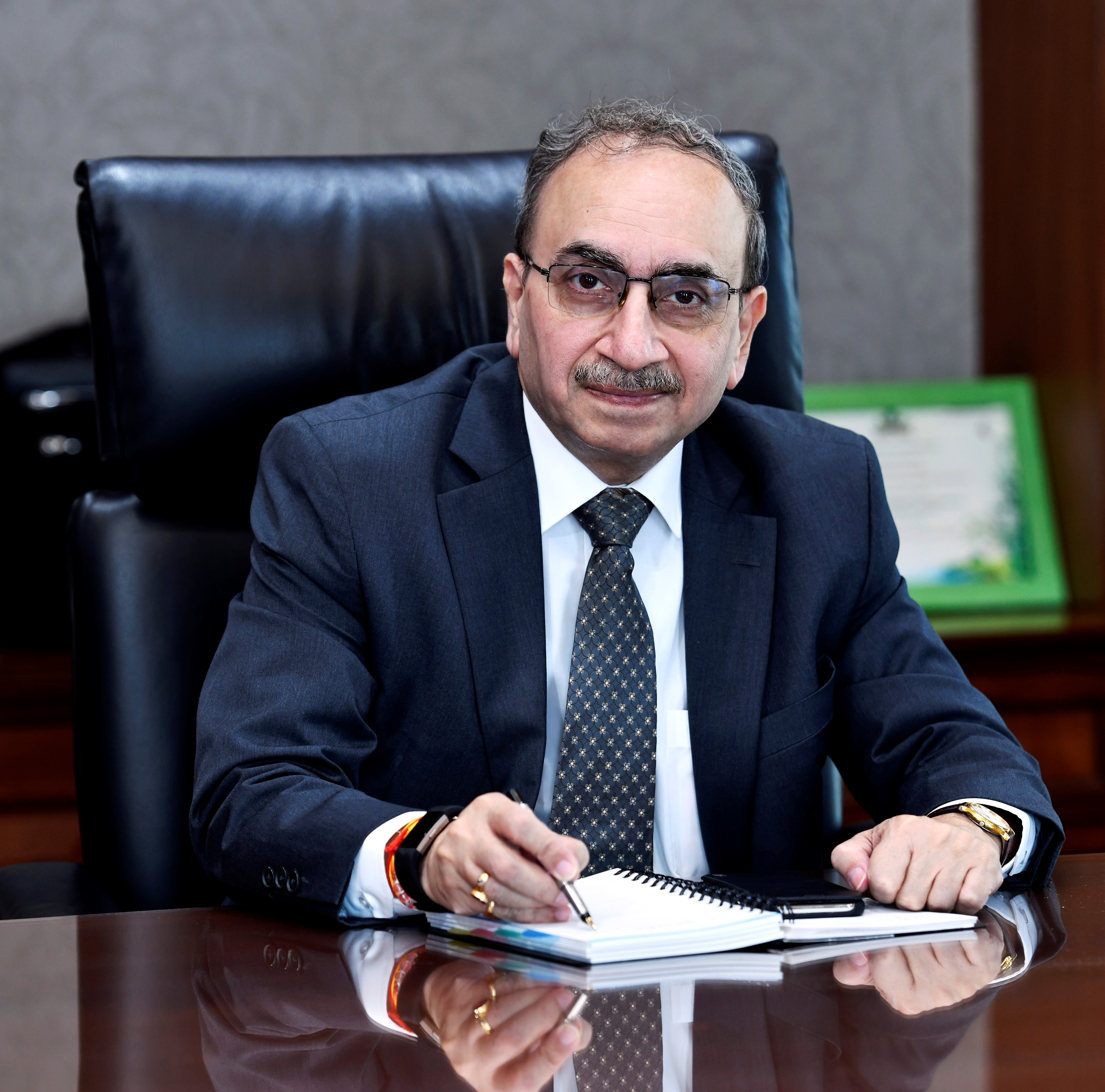
- Dinesh Kumar Khara in 2020

26th Chairperson of State Bank of India
- In office 7 October 2020 – 28 August 2024
- Preceded by: Rajnish Kumar
- Succeeded by: Challa Sreenivasulu Setty

Personal details
- Born: 28 August 1961 (age 65)
- Education: (MCom) Delhi School of Economics (MBA) Faculty of Management Studies – University of Delhi; Delhi University

Dinesh Kumar Khara (born 28 August 1961) is an Indian Business Executive and Career Banker who served as the Chairman of the State Bank of India from 7 October 2020 to 28 August 2024.

== Education ==
He is a MCom from Delhi School of Economics and an MBA from the Faculty of Management Studies – University of Delhi, New Delhi.

He is also a Certified Associate of the Indian Institute of Bankers (CAIIB).

== Career ==
He joined the SBI in 1984 as a Probationary Officer.

He rose up the ranks in the bank to eventually become the chairman of the SBI.

He has held several key positions such as MD (Global Banking & Subsidiaries), MD (Associates & Subsidiaries), MD & CEO (SBI Mutual Funds) and Chief General Manager – Bhopal Circle. He was also posted in SBI, Chicago for an overseas assignment. As Managing Director, he led the International Banking Group, Corporate Banking and Global Treasury Operations, as well as the non-banking subsidiaries of the Bank viz., SBI Cards, SBIMF, SBI Life Insurance and SBI General Insurance, etc.

He executed the merger of five Subsidiary Banks of SBI and Bhartiya Mahila Bank with SBI. Additionally, he headed the Risk, IT and Compliance functions of the bank at various points.
