= Raj Kumar Talwar =

Chairman of State Bank of India

5th Chairman of State Bank of India
- Preceded by: V. T. Dehejia
- Succeeded by: T. R. Varadachary

Personal details
- Born: 28 May 1922

Raj Kumar Talwar (1922–2002) was an Indian business executive. He served as chairman of State Bank of India and was sacked by the Indira Gandhi government in the emergency in 1976 for refusing to grant loans to people favoured by the government. As no provision in the SBI Act allowed them to terminate the chairman, the Act was amended to sack him.

== Early life ==
He was born in 1922. He earned an M.A. degree in Mathematics from Lahore University.

== Legacy ==
Talwar was known for his values, integrity, dynamism and professionalism. He left the Bank on 3 August 1976, at age 54.Settling in Pondicherry, he served on boards of companies and headed the Industrial Development Bank of India in the late 1970s. He lived a spartan life and traveled around Pondicherry on a bicycle. He died on 23 April 2002.
