= P. G. Kakodkar =

Indian career banker (1937–2020)

- Portrait of Kakodkar

16th Chairman of State Bank of India
- In office 1 October 1995 – 31 March 1997
- Preceded by: Dipankar Basu
- Succeeded by: M. S. Verma

Personal details
- Born: Pandurang Ghanasham Kakodkar; 10 March 1937 Goa, Portuguese India
- Died: 8 November 2020 (aged 83) Panaji, Goa, India
- Education: Master of Arts in Economics
- Alma mater: St Anthony's High School
- Occupation: Banker
- Committees: Goa Chamber of Commerce and Industries (GCCI)
- Nickname: Guru Bab

Pandurang Ghanasham Kakodkar (10 March 1937 – 8 November 2020) popularly known as Guru Bab, also known as P. G. Kakodkar, was an Indian career banker who served as the sixteenth Chairman of State Bank of India. He also served as the Chairman of Goa Public Service Commission from 1997 to 1991, finally being appointed as a member of the Managing Committee of Goa Chamber of Commerce and Industries (GCCI).

== Early life and education ==
Pandurang Ghanasham Kakodkar was born and raised in the Indian coastal state of Goa. He completed his schooling at St. Anthony's High School. He later obtained a Master of Arts degree in Economics.

== Death ==
On 8 November 2020, Kakodkar died following a cardiac arrest in Panaji, he was 83.

== Career ==
=== Early career ===
Kakodkar had joined the State Bank of India as a probationary officer in 1957 and served in a number of roles until finally becoming the Chairman of State Bank of India in 1995.

=== Banking career ===
He then served as the sixteenth Chairman of State Bank of India from 1 October 1995 until 31 March 1997. He was largely responsible for the bank's entry into the global capital markets through its very own Global depository receipt (GDR) issue. After his retirement in 1997, he was succeeded by M. S. Verma as the Chairman of State Bank of India.

=== Later career ===
After Kakodkar's retirement, he served as the chairman of the Goa Public Service Commission from 1997 to 1999. He was also appointed as a member of the Managing Committee of Goa Chamber of Commerce and Industries (GCCI).

== Bibliography ==
He has written several books, including his bestselling autobiography My 40 years with SBI:

- My 40 years with SBI (His autobiography published in 2006)
- Investment by pension funds in emerging markets in Asia with special reference to India (A scholarly article written by him)
