= H. V. R. Iengar =

Indian banker and civil servant (1902–1978)

H.V.R. Iengar
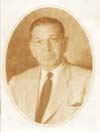

6th Governor of the Reserve Bank of India
- In office 1 March 1957 – 28 February 1962
- Preceded by: K. G. Ambegaonkar
- Succeeded by: P. C. Bhattacharya

2nd Chairman of State Bank of India
- In office 1 October 1956 – 28 February 1957
- Preceded by: John Matthai
- Succeeded by: P. C. Bhattacharya

Personal details
- Born: 23 August 1902
- Died: 22 February 1978 (aged 75)
- Education: University of Mysore; Queen's College, Oxford

Haravu Venkatanarasingha Verada Raj "H. V. R." Iengar CIE, ICS (23 August 1902 – 22 February 1978) was the sixth Governor of the Reserve Bank of India from 1 March 1957 to 28 February 1962.

He was a member of the Indian Civil Service, entering service on 20 October 1926. He was invested as a Companion of the Order of the Indian Empire (CIE) in the 1941 New Year Honours. He served as the Chairman of State Bank of India, before his appointment as the Governor of the Reserve Bank.

During Iengar's tenure, the Indian coinage system shifted from the earlier pies, paise, and anna system to the modern decimal coinage system. During his tenure also variable cash reserve ratio and selective credit control were introduced for the first time in India. He received the Padma Vibhushan, India`s second highest civilian honour from the Government of India in 1962. In 2002 on his birth centenary, an illustrated book, Snapshots of History— Through The Writings of H V R Iyengar consisting of articles written by Iengar after his retirement in 1962, were compiled and edited by his daughter Indira and son-in-law Bipin Patel.
