= R. P. Goyal =

Indian career banker (d. 2011)

10th Chairman of State Bank of India
- In office 31 January 1983 – 30 November 1983
- Preceded by: V. S. Natarajan
- Succeeded by: Vishwanath N. Nadkarni

Personal details
- Born: Mumbai, India
- Died: 22 October 2011 Worli, Mumbai, India

R. P. Goyal (died 22 October 2011, Worli) was an Indian career banker who served as the tenth Chairman of State Bank of India.

== Biography ==
Goyal was born and raised in the Indian city of Mumbai.

He joined the State Bank of India as a probationary officer and served in a number of roles until finally becoming the Chairman of State Bank of India in 1983. He served as the tenth Chairman of State Bank of India from 31 January 1983 until 30 November 1983. After his retirement in 1983, he was succeeded by Vishwanath N. Nadkarni as the Chairman of State Bank of India. After having retired from the State Bank of India in 1983, he became a lifelong member of the Institute of Cost Accountants of India.

He died on 22 October 2011 in Worli, Mumbai. His obituary was published by The Times of India on 23 October 2011.
