= P. C. Bhattacharya =

Indian banker

Paresh Chandra Bhattacharya

7th Governor of the Reserve Bank of India
- In office 1 March 1962 – 30 June 1967
- Preceded by: H. V. R. Iyengar
- Succeeded by: L. K. Jha

Personal details
- Born: 1 March 1903 West Bengal, India
- Died: 13 February 1969 (aged 66) Calcutta, West Bengal, India
- Education: University of Calcutta
- Occupation: Civil Servant, Banker
- Known for: Governor, RBI; Finance Secretary; Chairman, SBI

Paresh Chandra Bhattacharya OBE (born 1 March 1903 – 13 February 1969) was the seventh Governor of the Reserve Bank of India from 1 March 1962 to 30 June 1967. Unlike his predecessors he was a member of the Indian Audits and Accounts Service (IA&AS). He was appointed an Officer of the Order of the British Empire (OBE) in the 1946 New Year Honours. He served as Secretary in the Finance Ministry and later as Chairman of State Bank of India before his appointment as Governor.

As RBI Governor he strongly opposed the nationalising of private banks in India, by writing a letter to the then Deputy Prime Minister Morarji Desai warning about the costs of nationalising the banks saying it was not desirable. During his tenure the size of the currency notes of denomination 5, 10 and 100 were reduced in size for economic reasons.

Bhattacharya's tenure saw the establishment of the Industrial Development Bank of India in 1964, the Agricultural Refinance Corporation in 1963 and the Unit Trust of India in 1964.

The banknotes signed by P C Bhattacharya have very high resale value in the grey market because of their rarity. A 10 rupee note signed by Bhattacharya fetches 800 to 1000 rupees today. During his tenure as Governor of RBI, the size of the bank notes of ₹ 5, 10 and 100 denominations had been reduced to cut cost of production, which make these notes relatively rare in the collectors market.
