= Goa Public Service Commission =

Indian government body

- गोंय लोक सेवा आयोग

Constitutional body overview
- Formed: 30 May 1988
- Preceding Constitutional body: Governor Of Goa
- Jurisdiction: Goa
- Headquarters: EDC House, Dada Vaidya Road, Panaji, Goa; 15.4954°N 73.8248°E
- Constitutional body executive: Jose Manuel Noronha, Chairman
- Website: gpsc.goa.gov.in

The Goa Public Service Commission (GPSC) is a constitutional body of the government of Goa, India, responsible for recruiting through standardized examinations candidates for various state government jobs under the Government of Goa. It deals with matters relating to the appointment, rules of recruitment, transfer, promotion and disciplinary action of government officials. It reports directly to the Governor of Goa.

The chairman and other members are appointed by the Governor of Goa. In 2018, Jose Manuel Noronha was the chairman, Ameya Abhayankar was secretary and Seema V. Malkarnekar the deputy-secretary.

== History ==
After Goa became a Union territory in 1962, the Union Public Service Commission was responsible for civil service recruitment and other service-related matters. When Goa became a State of India in 1987, it became entitled to its own Public Service Commission. The Goa Public Service Commission was set up on 30 May 1988. The first chairman was J.C. Almeida.

== See also ==
- Goa Human Rights Commission
- Goa State Information Commission
- List of Public service commissions in India
