= Arunachal Pradesh Freedom of Religion Act =

Indian anti-conversion law of the state of Arunachal Pradesh

AFRA, 1978

Legislative Assembly of the Union Territory of Arunachal Pradesh
- Long title: Arunachal Pradesh Freedom of Religion Act, 1978
- Citation: Act No. 4 of 1978
- Territorial extent: Arunachal Pradesh
- Enacted by: Legislative Assembly of the Union Territory of Arunachal Pradesh
- Assented to: 25 October 1978
- Commenced: Not operationalised; implementing rules not framed as of 2026
- Introduced by: Government of Prem Khandu Thungon

The Arunachal Pradesh Freedom of Religion Act, 1978 (APFRA) is a state law of Arunachal Pradesh, India, that prohibits religious conversion. It was passed by the first Legislative Assembly of the then Union Territory of Arunachal Pradesh during the Janata Party government of Chief Minister Prem Khandu Thungon and received presidential assent on 25 October 1978.

== Background ==
APFRA is among the early anti-conversion laws in independent India following those passed in other states such as the Orissa Freedom of Religion Act, 1967, and Madhya Pradesh's Dharma Swatantrya Adhiniyam (Religious Freedom Act) in 1968.

Christian missionary activity in the North-East Frontier Agency (NEFA), later Arunachal Pradesh, had begun in the mid-20th century. In the 1971 India census, Christian population was less than one percent in the territory, which increased to just four percent in the following census. At the time of enacting the APFRA, the union territory was witnessing a surge in the Christian missionary activity.

== Provisions ==
APFRA protects a category of "indigenous faiths," covers religion, rites, and customs then predominantly practiced by indigenous communities. The statutory definition names, Buddhism, Vaishnavism and Donyi-Polo.

Section 3 of the Act, prohibits any person from converting or attempting to convert another from one religious faith to another by force, inducement or fraudulent means, or abetting such conversion. "Force" includes the threat of divine displeasure or social excommunication, and "inducement" includes any gift or material benefit.

Critics argue this definition privileges those faiths while effectively excluding Christianity and Islam even though neither Vaishnavism or Buddhism was indigenous to Arunachal Pradesh.

It prescribes imprisonment of up to two years and a fine of up to ₹10,000.

== Reception ==
The Indigenous Faith and Cultural Society of Arunachal Pradesh (IFCSAP), formed in 2010, has been the principal organised supporter of the Act and has pressed the central government to expedite the rules. A delegation met RSS chief Mohan Bhagwat in Itanagar in November 2024 in connection with the demand, a meeting cited as evidence of a working relationship between the institutional indigenous-faith movement and Hindu nationalist organisations. Scholars have analysed this alignment as part of the growth of religious nationalism and the institutionalisation of indigenous faiths in the state. The Arunachal Christian Forum (ACF), formed in 1979, has consistently opposed the Act as anti-Christian and contrary to secularism, and led large protests against its implementation in early 2025. ACF president Tarh Miri argued that operationalising the Act would create religious tension previously absent from the state, and critics contend that the "inducement" and "fraud" provisions are broad enough to reach routine pastoral and charitable work.

== Implementation ==
While APFRA has been a law since 1978, it has remained non-enforceable for almost five decades. Since receiving presidential assent in 1978, successive governments failed to frame the rules required for prosecution. This dormancy ended in 2024, when the Gauhati High Court ordered the state government to finalise the rules within six months, reviving political contestation between indigenous-faith organisations and Christian groups.

== Legacy ==
Several journalists and political commentators have identified K. A. A. Raja, the territory's first chief commissioner, as instrumental in pushing for the law. During his tenure, the territory witnessed attacks on new churches and its missionaries. Raja also, later in 1977, invited the RSS ideologue Eknath Ranade and the Vivekananda Kendra to open schools in the territory to proselytise the populace into Hinduism.

In a March 2025 recollection in The Arunachal Times, former state home minister James Lowangcha Wanglat said Raja had told him of a perception that the Central Intelligence Agency sought a Christian-majority buffer state along the borders with China and Myanmar. Wanglat cited this as one of the factors behind the framing of Christianity as a "foreign religion."

Andhra Pradesh and Tamil Nadu enacted similar laws in 1967.

== See also ==
- Anti-conversion laws in India
- Christianity in Arunachal Pradesh
- Donyi-Polo
- Religion in Arunachal Pradesh
- Freedom of religion in India
- Article 25 of the Constitution of India
