= Tongam Rina =

Indian journalist (born 1979)

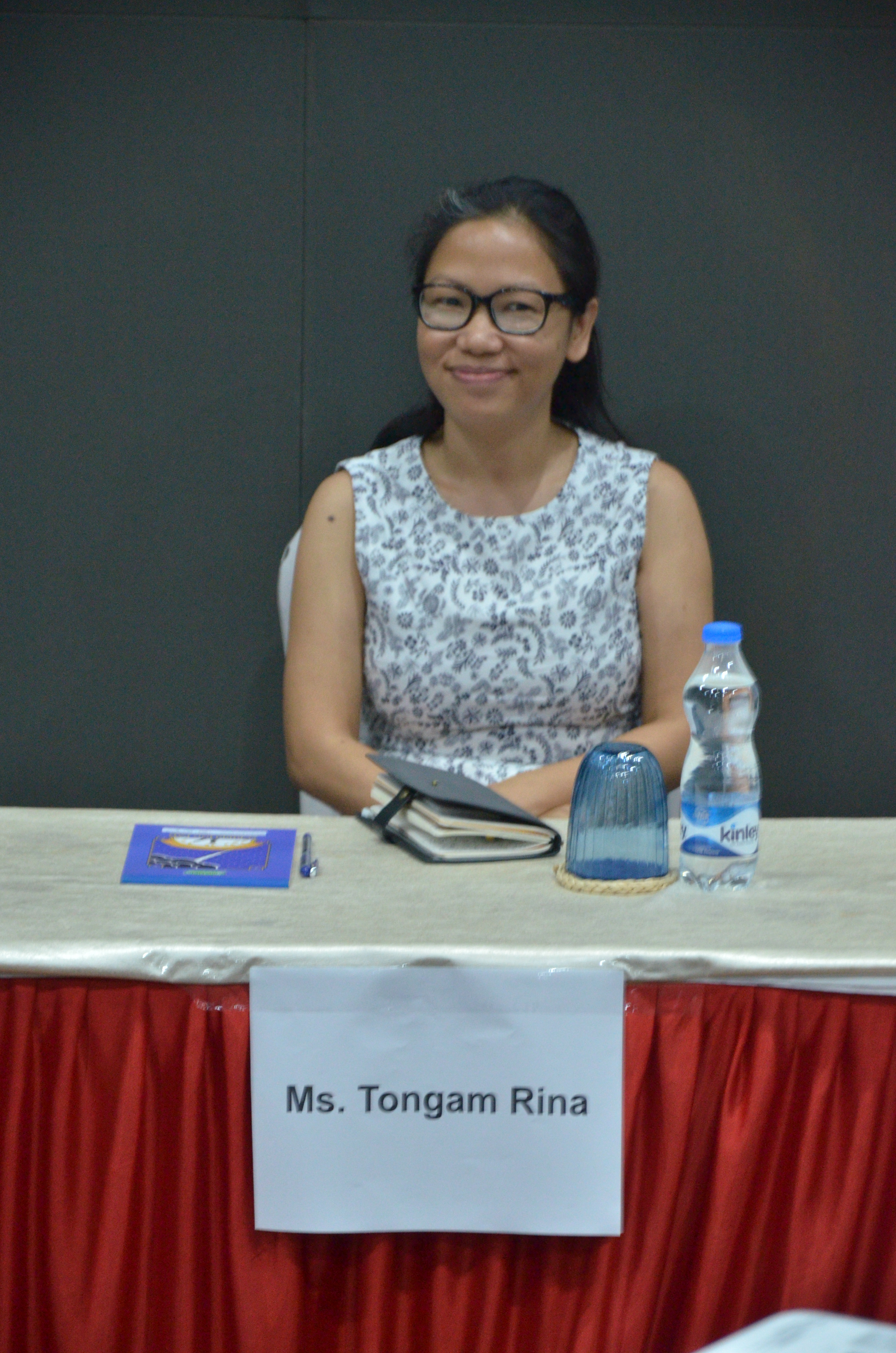
- Tongam Rina in 2019
- Occupation: Journalist
- Notable credit: The Arunachal Times

Tongam Rina (born 1979) is an Indian journalist and human rights activist. She is currently (2020) the Associate Editor of Arunachal Times and former president of the Arunachal Pradesh Union of Working Journalists. She has been repeatedly threatened, and in 2012, was near-fatally shot outside her office after she wrote critical articles about corruption, militants and dam projects in Arunachal Pradesh.

== Career ==
Rina started as a journalist in 2003. She has been writing about the insurgent group National Socialist Council of Nagaland (IM), corruption, hydropower projects, and the injustices that the tribals face. Some of the topics covered include corruption in kerosene and food distribution. She also led the Siang People's Forum as its vice-president, campaigning against the plans to construct dams across the Siang River.

=== 2026 Siang protests ===
In October 2026, Rina was named in Arunachal Pradesh Police requests for search warrants in connection with violence in Pasighat on 23 October during protests against the proposed Siang Upper Multipurpose Project, and the Press Club of India condemned her inclusion as an attack on press freedom.

== Assassination attempt ==
Rina was shot at by three gunmen on the evening of 15 July 2012, outside the Itanagar office of The Arunachal Times. She was immediately taken to the nearby Rama Krishna Mission Hospital, where the doctors' prognosis revealed that she had sustained serious injuries to her intestines and spinal cord, and she was rushed into surgery. After repeated demands from the press, the state's police department handed over the case to the Central Bureau of Investigation, which turned it down. More than a year later, the police identified one Yumlang Achung as having planned the attack. His accomplices, Ajit Pegu and Raju Gurung revealed that they were upset at Rina for not reporting about Achung or his group's activities in her newspaper. Achung was later arrested and released, and Rina recovered from her injuries, as the bullet had simply grazed her spinal cord.

== Awards and accolades ==
For her journalistic work covering the unsuitability of hydropower projects, she received "Wind under the Wings Award" presented in 2017 by The Sanctuary Nature Foundation. She has also been awarded the CNN-IBN Indian of the Year in Public Service, for the year 2015, the Laadli Media Award 2011–12 for Gender Sensitivity, and was honoured by the Reporters Without Borders in 2014. In 2013, she was chosen for the 'Prize for the Freedom and Future of the Media', awarded by the Media Foundation of Leipzig, Germany.
