= Janki Vallabh =

Indian banker

- Born: 24 October 1942 (age 83); Uttar Pradesh
- Known for: Chairman of State Bank of India
- Scientific career
- Fields: banking

Janki Vallabh (alternate spelling: Janki Ballabh) was an Indian career banker who served as the Chairman of State Bank of India from 1 November 2000 to 31 October 2002. He was also a certified associate of the Indian Institute of Banking and Finance.

== Early life and education ==
He was born on 24 October 1942. He completed his M.Com degree at the St. John's College, Agra in 1963.

== Career ==
=== Early career ===
He started his career as a lecturer in the Department of Commerce at the St. John's College, Agra. He later worked as a lecturer in the Department of Commerce at the Shri Ram College of Commerce, Delhi University.

=== Banking career ===
He served as the Chairman of State Bank of India from 1 November 2000 to 31 October 2002.

He served as the Vigilance Commissioner at the Central Vigilance Commission from 5 November 2002 to 4 November 2005.

He has also interviewed several candidates for the post of Managing Director in various banks such as Bank of India, Punjab National Bank, Oriental Bank of Commerce and United Bank of India.

In 2019, he was named as the replacement for Naresh Goyal on the board of directors of Jet Airways, after the airline succumbed to financial setbacks and was taken over by its creditors, including the State Bank of India.

=== Board Seats Held ===
He has held board level positions at the below companies:

- UTI Trust
- Small Industries Development Bank of India
- Tata Capital
- Nucleus Software Exports

== Criticism and Controversies ==
The Gujarat gold bullion scam occurred during his tenure. It caused a loss of Rs. 40 crore to the State Bank of India and mainly affected the branches of the Gujarat circle of the bank.
