= Arundhati Bhattacharya =

Indian banker

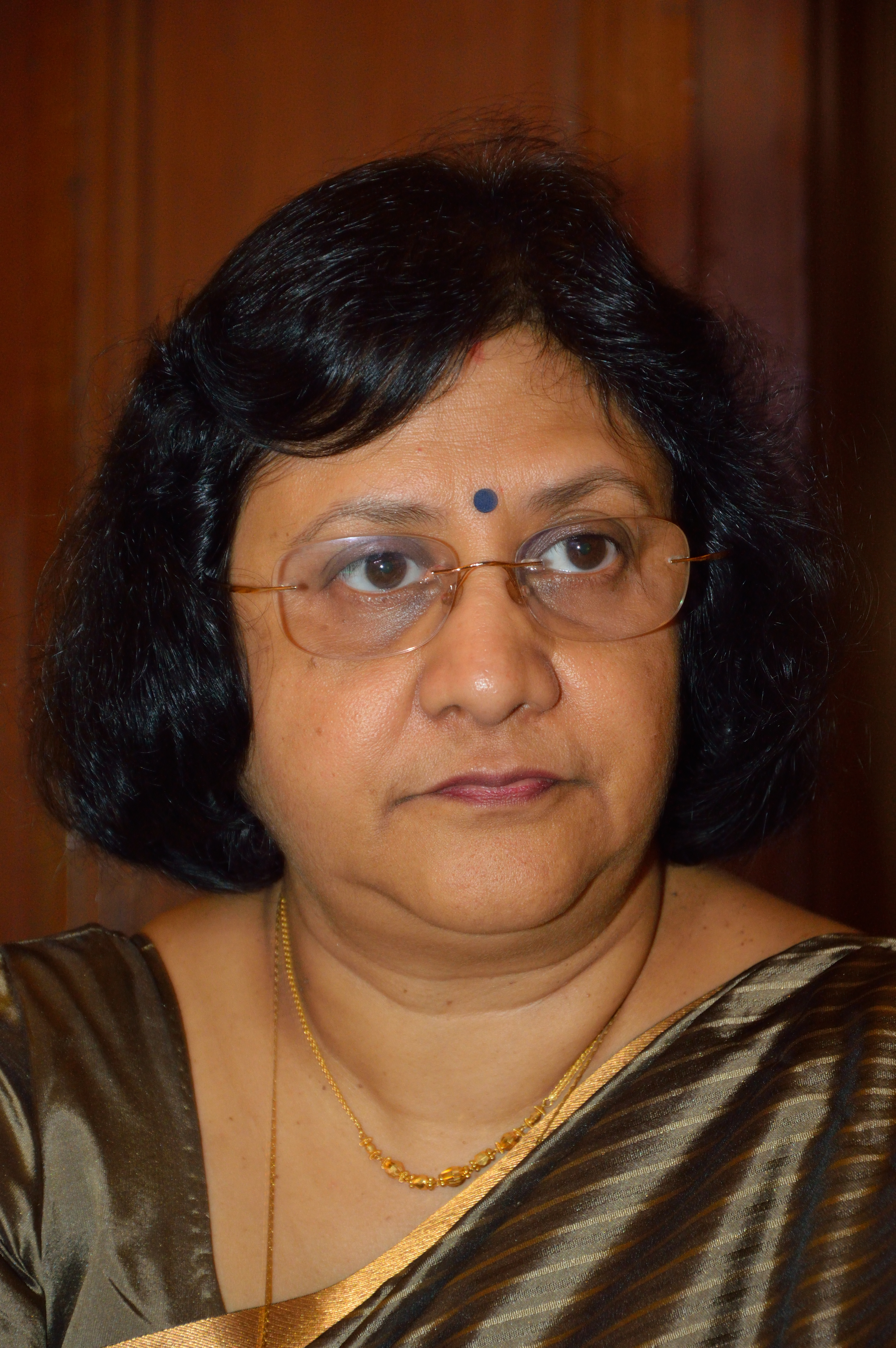
- Bhattacharya in May 2014

Chairperson and Managing Director, State Bank of India
- In office 7 October 2013 – 6 October 2017
- Preceded by: Pratip Chaudhuri
- Succeeded by: Rajnish Kumar

Personal details
- Born: 18 March 1956 (age 70) Kolkata, West Bengal, India
- Spouse: Pritimoy Bhattacharya
- Education: University of Calcutta; Jadavpur University; Lady Brabourne College, Kolkata

Arundhati Bhattacharya (born 18 March 1956) is the chairperson and chief executive officer for Salesforce, India. She is also retired Indian banker and former Chairperson of the State Bank of India. She is the first woman to be the Chairperson of State Bank of India. In 2016, she was listed as the 25th most powerful woman in the world by Forbes. She is the only Indian corporate leader listed on Fortune's world's greatest leaders list ranked at 26.

In 2018, Harvard Business Review published an interview with her titled "Arundhati Bhattacharya: The Making of SBI's First Woman Chairperson".

In January 2025, she was honored with the Padma Shri, India's fourth-highest civilian award, by the Government of India.

== Early life and education ==
Bhattacharya was born in a Bengali family in the city of Kolkata and spent her childhood in Bhilai and Bokaro Steel City. Her father, Prodyut Kumar Mukherjee worked at Bokaro Steel Plant. Her mother, Kalyani Mukherjee was a homeopathy consultant in Bokaro.

Bhattacharya had her schooling at St. Xavier's School (Bokaro). She studied English literature at Calcutta's Lady Brabourne College and then at Jadavpur University. Her husband, Pritimoy Bhattacharya, is an ex-professor of IIT Kharagpur.

== Career ==
Bhattacharya joined SBI in September 1977. She is the first woman to lead an India-based Fortune India 500 company. Initially, she joined SBI in 1977 as a Probationary Officer at the age of 22 years. She has held several positions during her 36-year career with the bank including working in foreign exchange, treasury, retail operations, human resources and investment banking. This included positions like the chief executive of the bank's merchant banking arm- State Bank of India Capital Markets; chief general manager in charge of new projects. She has also served at the bank's New York office. She has been involved with the launch of several new businesses such as SBI General Insurance, SBI Custodial Services, SBI Pension Funds Pvt. Ltd. and the SBI Macquarie Infrastructure Fund. She succeeded Pratip Chaudhuri, as chairman, who retired 30 Sep. 2013 She introduced a two-year sabbatical leave policy for the bank's female employees to use either for maternity or elder care. On Women's day, she announced free vaccination against cervical cancer to all the bank's female employees.

In 2016, she was named the 25th most powerful woman in the world by Forbes, which was her first time being ranked on the list. In the same year, she was ranked among the FP Top 100 Global Thinkers by Foreign Policy magazine She was named the 4th most powerful woman in Asia Pacific by Fortune. In 2017, India Today magazine ranked her at 19th in India's 50 Most powerful people of 2017 list.

She was due for retirement in October 2016, but was granted an extension till October 2017, allegedly for the controversial merger of the SBI's five associate banks and Bharatiya Mahila Bank, in the wake of gross non-performing assets (GNPAs) mounting to 73 percent; the present government justifying the move through Banks Board Bureau, who consolidated her extension.

In 2018 she was named Business Leader of the Year at The Asian Awards. Arundhati Bhattacharya has joined as additional director, 'independent director' of Reliance Industries for five years commencing 17 October 2018.

In 2020 she was hired as the chairperson and chief executive for the India division of Salesforce, the global giant in CRM. She is also currently chairperson of SWIFT India, part of a global payments network.

Bhattacharya tendered her resignation as an independent director of CRISIL (a global analytical company providing ratings, research, and risk and policy advisory services) effective 15 April.

She cited her joining Salesforce India as chairperson and CEO effective 20 April as the reason for the resignation. Bhattacharya would report to Ulrik Nehammer, General Manager APAC.

Currently, she is working as a non-executive director with Reliance Industries Limited.

She is also serving as the chairperson of the board of governors of the Indian Institute of Management, Sambalpur.

In January 2022, Bhattacharya released her autobiography “Indomitable: A Working Woman's Notes on Work, Life and Leadership” published by HarperCollins. In which she details her contributions in her career and experiences and views of being a working woman in a male-dominated industry. Additionally Bhattacharya talks about her childhood, early education, college education and then her career into the State Bank of India (SBI).

== Awards ==
- "Sera Bangali" – Serar Sera Award (2015) by the Anandabazar Patrika
- Padma Shri - January 2025 by Government of India
