= State Bank of Saurashtra =

Former associate bank of State Bank of India

The State Bank of Saurashtra was a government-owned bank in India, with its headquarters at Bhavnagar. It was one of the seven Associate Banks of the State Bank of India, with which it merged on 13 August 2008. At the time of the merger, the bank had a network of 423 branches spread over 15 states and the Union Territory of Daman and Diu.

Prior to 1948, the region of Saurashtra, which at present forms a part of Gujarat State, comprised many small, medium and large princely states. Bhavnagar, Rajkot, and Jamnagar, which were among the larger states, and two smaller states, Palitana and Vadia, had established their own Darbar (meaning Palace) Banks, the oldest of which was Bhavnagar Darbar Bank, established in 1902. These banks mainly catered to the needs of the governments of their respective princely states, and acted as depositories for local savings. After the establishment of Saurashtra state in 1948, there was a parallel amalgamation of these banks. The Bhavnagar Darbar Bank became the State Bank of Saurashtra, under the Saurashtra State Banks (Amalgamation) Ordinance, 1950 (renamed as the State Bank of Saurashtra Act, 1950 by the 3rd schedule of the State Bank of India (Subsidiary Banks) Act, 1959), and the four Darbar Banks - Rajkot State Bank, (Note: Lakhajirajsinhji II Bavajirajsinhji established the bank in 1912 to assist traders and industrialists.) Porbandar State Bank, (Note: The bank commenced operations on 15 October 1925. It was a department of Porbandar State and functioned as a savings bank. The bank expanded into the granting of commercial and other advances.) Palitana Darbar Bank, (Note: The bank was established in 1936. In 1943 it temporarily issued some money coupons to alleviate the shortage of petty cash resulting from shortages of metal for minting.) and Vadia State Bank (Note: Vadia State established its own bank at Vadia in 1936. This bank functioned more or less as a department of the State.) - were merged with it with effect from 1 July 1950 as its branches. At the close of 1950 the Bank had only 9 branches and deposits of Rs.7 crores.

In 1960, following the formation of a separate Gujarat State, the bank's main area of operation - Saurashtra - became a part of Gujarat. At the same time, the State Bank of India took over the State Bank of Saurashtra, along with the other major state-owned banks under the State Bank of India (Subsidiary Banks) Act, 1959. By this time, the number of branches had increased to 24, with aggregate deposits of Rs.13.39 crores, total advances of Rs.7.93 crores, and an investment portfolio of Rs.8.04 crores. The paid up capital and reserves were Rs.1.51 crores. The bank also had 866 employees.

The bank's first chairman was Jagubhai S. Parikh, and he served until 1960. He was the Deputy Chief Minister of Bhavnagar State Cabinet and was the first Finance Minister in the post-Independence Saurashtra Cabinet.

== See also ==
- Indian banking

== Notes, citations and references ==
Notes

Citations

References

- Ray, Abhik; Das, Suman (2009). The evolution of the State Bank of India: The era from 1995 to 1980. Vol. 4. Penguin Books India. ISBN 9780670999064.
- Robin, Jeffrey (1978). People, princes, and paramount power: society and politics in the Indian princely states. Oxford University Press.
