= Union of Catholic Asian News =

News agency

- Type: News agency
- Founded: 1979; 47 years ago
- Products: Online news in Asian
- Owners: Union of Catholic Asian News Limited
- Website: www.ucanews.com

The Union of Catholic Asian News (UCAN, UCA News) is a news agency that covers issues and matters of interest for the Catholic Church on the Asian continent. It was launched in Hong Kong in 1979 by Maryknoll Father Robert Astorino. Since its foundation, it has become one of the largest Catholic news agencies in the world, as well as the largest in Asia.

A principal goal of UCAN's reporting is to bring the lives and experiences of Asian Catholics to their brothers and sisters in the United States, Europe and elsewhere.

== Bibliography ==
- Yu-Jose, Lydia N., ed. (2011). Civil Society Organizations in the Philippines: A Mapping and Strategic Assessment. Quezon City: Civil Society Resource Institute (CSRI). ISBN 978-971-95145-0-3. OCLC 971242316. Archived from the original on August 16, 2026 – via Department of Foreign Affairs and Trade.
- Chan, Shun-hing (2015). "Changing Church–State Relations in Contemporary China: A Case Study of the Cangzhou Diocese". Journal of Church and State. 57 (2). Oxford University Press: 243–267. doi:10.1093/jcs/cst094. ISSN 2040-4867. JSTOR 24708878. OCLC 5950980795. S2CID 145332118.
