= O. P. Bhatt =

Indian banker

Om Prakash Bhatt
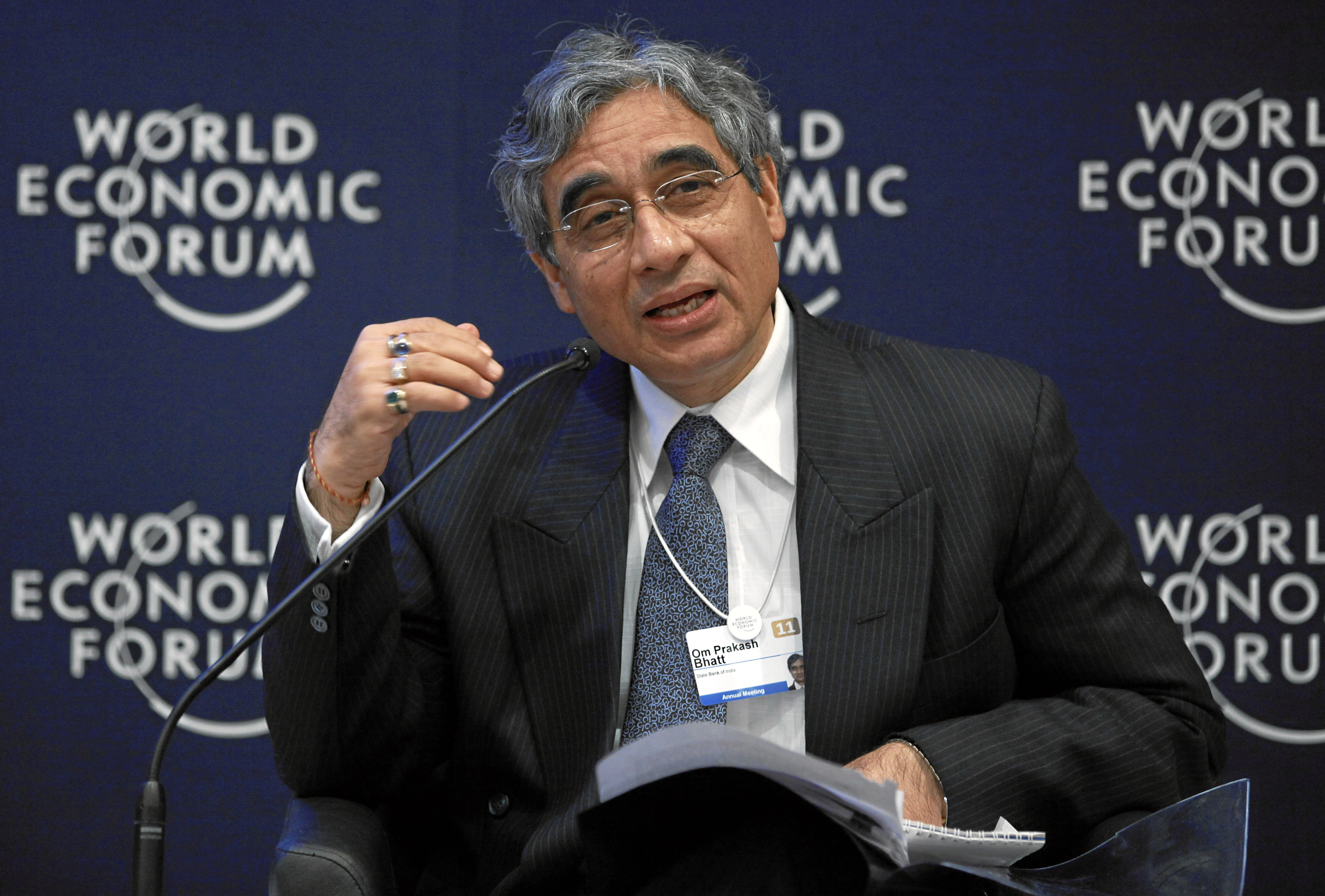
- Bhatt at the World Economic Forum annual meeting in 2011

22nd Chairman of State Bank of India
- Preceded by: Arun Kumar Purwar
- Succeeded by: Pratip Chaudhuri

Personal details
- Born: 7 March 1951 (age 75) Dehradun, Uttarakhand, India

Om Prakash Bhatt (born 7 March 1951) is an Indian banker and was the Chairman of State Bank of India from June 2006 until 31 March 2011 Presently, he is an independent director on the board of the 'Maharatna' Central Public Sector Enterprise - Oil and Natural Gas Corporation Ltd (ONGC), Tata Steel Ltd and also Hindustan Unilever Ltd. (HUL). On 25 November 2016 he was made interim chairman of TATA Steel, replacing Cyrus Mistry. He continues as an independent director after N. Chandrasekaran took over as Chairman in 2017. The Supreme Court appointed him member of a committee to investigate issues arising out of US short-seller Hindenburg's report on the Adani Group on 2 March 2023.

== Early life ==
Om Prakash Bhatt was born on 7 March 1951 in Dehradun, Uttarakhand. He was National Science Talent Search Scholar in Physics at DAV College, Dehradun. He obtained an MA in English Literature from Meerut University. His favorite holiday destinations are hills in Uttarakhand and North-East (he was Chief General Manager of NE Circle).

== Career ==
O. P. Bhatt Started his career as a probationary officer in SBI in 1972. He also served as Managing Director, State Bank of Travancore from January 2005 to April 2006. Before becoming Managing Director of SBT he was Chief General Manager of North-East Circle and within a year he lifted the circle from bottom to No. 1 position.

He was appointed Chairman of SBI in June 2006. He retired in March 2011 and had a long tenure as SBI Chairman in the recent past, one of the very few who served 5 years as Chairman. He is best known for transforming SBI and bringing efficiency and competitiveness in operations. Under his chairmanship, SBI adopted an aggressive strategy in marketing and operations.

He was the Chairman of the Indian Banks' Association (IBA) for the year 2010–11.

Bhatt is an independent Director of Tata Consultancy Services.
