= Indian Institute of Banking and Finance =

- Type: Professional Body of Banks, Financial Institutions and their Employees In India.
- Founded: 1928; 98 years ago
- Headquarters: Kurla West, Mumbai, India
- Key people: Deepak Kumar Lalla (CEO); Challa Sreenivasulu Setty, Chairman, State Bank of India (President, Governing Council, IIBF)
- Website: www.iibf.org.in

Established in 1928 as a company under Section 26 of the Indian Companies Act, 1913, the Indian Institute of Banking & Finance (IIBF), formerly known as the Indian Institute of Bankers (IIB), is a professional body of Banks, Financial Institutions, and their employees in India.

It is known for its flagship courses, such as the Junior Associate of Indian Institute of Bankers (JAIIB)/Diploma in Banking and Finance (DBF) and the Certified Associate of Indian Institute of Bankers (CAIIB). With its membership of over 600 banks and financial institutions as institutional members and about 10,00,000 of their employees as individual members, IIBF is the largest Institute of its kind in the world.

== History ==
The Institute was founded in 1928 as the Indian Institute of Bankers on the model of the London Institute of Banking and Finance to license and regulate those professionals who are known as bankers. In 1925, with the encouragement of Sir Basil Blackett, the finance member in the executive council of the Viceroy of India, the Imperial Bank of India wrote a letter to The London Institute of Bankers requesting the bank to include questions on Indian banking in the institute's examinations failing which banks in India would have to start their own institute. In a reply dated 25 October 1925, Ernest Sykes, the Secretary of the London Institute of Bankers, encouraged Indian bankers to start their own institute. A detailed discussion was held on the subject at the board room of the Bombay head office of the Imperial Bank of India on 12 March 1927 and the Indian Institute of Bankers was established as a result on 30 April 1928 with Sir Norcot Warren, Managing Governor of the Imperial Bank of India as the first President. Sir Warren retired shortly afterwards and was succeeded by Sir Norman Murray. The first general meeting was held at Bombay on 9 July 1928 and the institute conducted its first associate examinations between 6 and 13 April 1929. A total of 89 candidates appeared for the examination of whom, only one, T. M. Srinivasaraghavan of the Imperial Bank of India, Cuddapah passed both parts of the two-part examination.

== Mission ==
The IIBF aims to be the premier institute for developing and nurturing competent professionals in the banking and finance sectors. This goal is achieved through a process of education, training, examination, consultancy, counselling, and continuing professional development programs.

== Objectives ==
- To facilitate study of theory and practice of banking and finance.
- To test and certify attainment of competence in the profession of banking and finance.
- To collect, analyze and provide information needed by professionals in banking and finance.
- To promote continuous professional development.
- To promote and undertake research relating to Operations, Products, Instruments, Processes, etc., in banking and finance.
- To encourage innovation and creativity among finance professionals so that they could face competition and succeed.

== Academics ==
The Flagship Courses of IIBF are Junior Associate of Indian Institute of Bankers (JAIIB) or its equivalent Diploma in Banking and Finance (DBF) and the Certified Associate of Indian Institute of Bankers (CAIIB). Other courses offered are

- Diploma in Treasury Investment & Risk Management
- Diploma in International Banking & Finance
- Diploma in Banking & Technology
- Diploma Examination for Micro Finance Professionals
- Diploma in Commodity Derivatives for Bankers
- Advance Diploma in Urban Co-operative Banking
- Diploma in Advanced Wealth Management and various Certificate programs

These are offered in distance mode. The pedagogy of Distance Learning offered by the institute is (i) publishing specific courseware for each paper/examination; (ii) publishing work books; (iii) tutorials through accredited institutions; (iv) contact classes; (v) virtual classes; (vi) e-learning through portal; (vii) campus training for selected courses, etc. The courses are considered to be comprehensive as well as exhaustive and recognized as the best in the field in India.

== Governing Council ==
The IIBF governing council consists of members/representatives from the Reserve Bank of India, National Banks, Regional Rural Banks, Apex Cooperative Banks, Financial Institutions and Private Banks. The Education and Research Committees of the Institute consist of eminent practitioners in the field.
