= List of banks that have merged to form the State Bank of India =

This list of banks that have merged to form the State Bank of India includes financial institutions that were at one point or the other merged with the State Bank of India or any of its subsidiaries.

This list includes the banks which have been subsidiaries or associates of the State Bank of India. Many of these subsidiaries were later merged into the main State Bank of India.

== List of banks that have merged to form the State Bank of India ==
Rank	Bank	Year of founding	Year of closing	Fate	Headquartered in	References
1	The Madras Bank	1683	1843	Merged with the Carnatic Bank, the British Bank of Madras (1795), and the Asiatic Bank to form the Bank of Madras in 1843	Madras Presidency	
2	Carnatic Bank	1788	1843	Merged with the Madras Bank, the British Bank of Madras (1795), and the Asiatic Bank to form the Bank of Madras in 1843	Madras Presidency	
3	The British Bank of Madras	1795	1843	Merged with the Madras Bank, the Carnatic Bank, and the Asiatic Bank to form the Bank of Madras in 1843	Madras Presidency	
4	The Asiatic Bank	1804	1843	Merged with the Madras Bank, the Carnatic Bank, and the British Bank of Madras to form the Bank of Madras in 1843	Madras Presidency	
5	Bank of Calcutta	1806	1921	Merged with the Bank of Bombay and Bank of Madras in 1921 to form the Imperial Bank of India	Calcutta	
6	Bank of Bombay	1840	1921	Merged with the Bank of Calcutta and Bank of Madras in 1921 to form the Imperial Bank of India	Bombay	
7	Bank of Madras	1843	1921	Merged with the Bank of Calcutta and Bank of Bombay in 1921 to form the Imperial Bank of India	Madras Presidency	
8	Delhi and London Bank	1844	1916	Merged with the Alliance Bank of Simla in 1916	New Delhi	
9	The Dacca Bank	1846	1862	Merged with the Bank of Calcutta in 1862	Dhaka	
10	The Bank of Upper India	1863	1913	Merged with the Alliance Bank of Simla in 1913	Dhaka	
11	Alliance Bank of Simla	1874	1923	Merged with the Imperial Bank of India in 1923	Shimla	
12	Punjab Banking Company	1889	1916	Merged with the Alliance Bank of Simla in 1916	Shimla	
13	State Bank of Mysore	1913	2017	Merged with the State Bank of India on 1 April 2017	Bangalore	
14	Krishnaram Baldeo Bank	1916	1975	Merged with the State Bank of India in 1975	Gwalior	
15	State Bank of Patiala	1917	2017	Merged with the State Bank of India on 1 April 2017	Patiala	
16	State Bank of Indore	1920	2017	Merged with the State Bank of India on 1 April 2010	Indore	
17	Imperial Bank of India	1921	1955	Renamed as the State Bank of India in 1955	India	
18	State Bank of Saurashtra	1925	2017	Merged with the State Bank of India on 1 April 2010	Gujarat	
19	State Bank of Hyderabad	1941	2017	Merged with the State Bank of India on 1 April 2017	Hyderabad	
20	State Bank of Travancore	1945	2017	Merged with the State Bank of India on 1 April 2017	Trivandrum	
21	Kashinath Seth Bank	1947	1995	Merged with the State Bank of India on 1 April 1995	Uttar Pradesh	
22	State Bank of Bikaner & Jaipur	1963	2017	Merged with the State Bank of India on 1 April 2017	Rajasthan	
23	Bharatiya Mahila Bank	2013	2017	Merged with the State Bank of India on 1 April 2017	India	
24	Mayurbhanj State Bank	1938	1961	Merged with the State Bank of India on 4 May 1961	Baripada	

== See also ==
- History of banking
- Banking in India
- List of oldest companies
- List of oldest companies in India
- Lindy effect
