= The Asiatic Bank =

Bank in India

- Type: Private sector
- Industry: Banking, Insurance, Capital Markets and allied industries
- Founded: 1 April 1804
- Defunct: 1 July 1843
- Fate: merged with the Bank of Madras
- Successor: Bank of Madras
- Headquarters: Chennai, India
- Number of locations: Madras Presidency
- Area served: India
- Products: Deposits, Personal Banking Schemes, C & I Banking Schemes, Agri Banking Schemes, SME Banking Schemes
- Services: Banking, Trade Finance
- Parent: State Bank of India

The Asiatic Bank was a bank founded in the year 1804 in British India. The bank was the ninth oldest bank in India.

The bank was eventually merged with the Bank of Madras in 1843.

== History ==
=== Founding ===
The Asiatic Bank was the third oldest bank founded in the Madras Presidency after The Madras Bank (1683), the Carnatic Bank (1788) and The British Bank of Madras (1795) served many cities in South India.

The bank was founded and largely managed by European traders. They worked closely with the English East India Company.

=== Management ===
The bank was staffed by mostly British nationals who were drawn mainly from the East India Company.

The bank had most of its offices and branches in the Madras Presidency.

=== Final years ===
The bank was one of four banks that were merged to form the Bank of Madras in 1843: The Madras Bank (1683), the Carnatic Bank and The British Bank of Madras (1795). The Bank of Madras is one of the precursors of the Imperial Bank of India and eventually the State Bank of India.

== Legacy ==
The bank was one of the first banks in India to print its own currency notes.

The bank is notable for being the ninth oldest bank in India.

The bank is also notable for being one of the precursors of the State Bank of India, through its predecessors the Imperial Bank of India and the Bank of Madras.

The establishment of the Asiatic Bank also marked a significant step towards organized financial services in colonial India, particularly in the Madras Presidency. Its merger into the Bank of Madras helped lay the administrative and operational framework for subsequent banking consolidations during the British era.

== See also ==
- Indian banking
- List of banks in India
