= Gumption =

Gumption means the ability to make the best decision in a situation and then do it with energy and determination. It can also mean bravery, drive, initiative, or get-up-and-go, it may refer to:

- Gumption County, a mythical location invented by radio talk-show host Joe Soucheray
- Gumption: Relighting the Torch of Freedom with America's Gutsiest Troublemakers, a 2015 book by Nick Offerman
- Gumption (album), a 1990 album by Jamaican reggae musician Bunny Wailer
- Gumption!, a 2010 book by American writer Elise Broach
- Moxie Gumption, a character in the American daily comic strip Ink Pen

== See also ==
- Grit, Guts and Gumption, a 2010 book by Rajesh Chakrabarti
- Important topic of the book Zen and the Art of Motorcycle Maintenance
