= State Bank of Hyderabad =

Former associate bank of State Bank of India

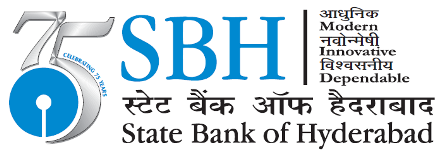

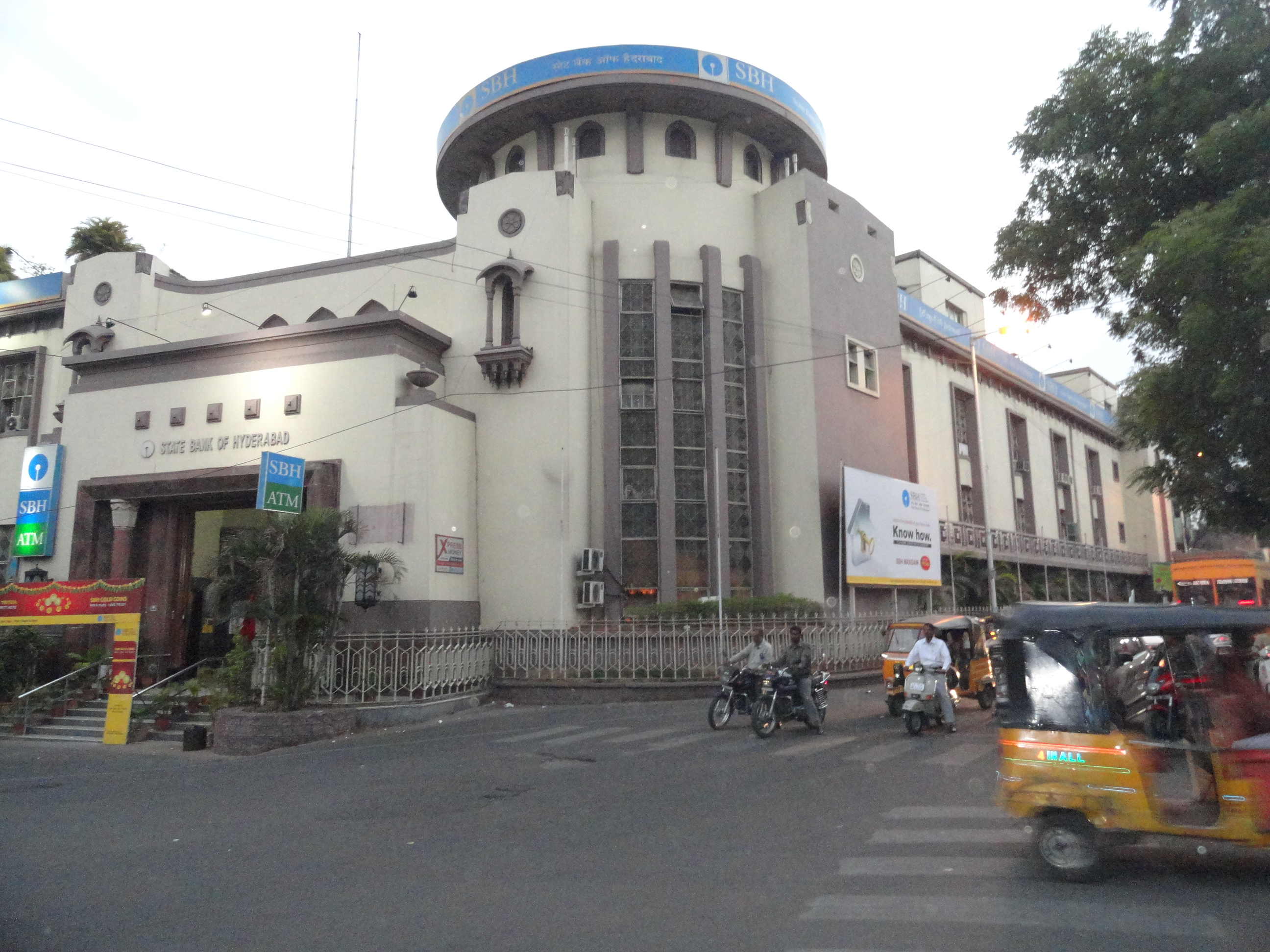
- State Bank of Hyderabad, HQ in 2012
- Trade name: SBH
- Formerly: Hyderabad State Bank
- Type: Public Sector
- Traded as: NSE: SBH; BSE: 972476
- Industry: Banking; Insurance; Capital Markets and allied industries
- Predecessor: Hyderabad State Bank
- Founded: August 8, 1941; 85 years ago
- Founder: Mir Osman Ali Khan
- Defunct: March 31, 2017; 9 years ago
- Fate: Renamed as State Bank of Hyderabad and share capital transferred to RBI in 1956. Made subsidiary of SBI in 1959. Merged into State Bank of India in 2017.
- Successor: State Bank of India
- Headquarters: Gunfoundry, Abids; Hyderabad India
- Area served: Pan-India.
- Key people: Rajnish Kumar (banker) (chairman), Mani Palvesan (managing director)
- Products: Personal Banking Schemes, Corporate Banking, SME Banking Schemes, FOREX, Mobile Banking, Internet Banking, Credit Cards, Insurance
- Net income: Rs. 1317 crores
- Owner: Government of India
- Number of employees: 17,000
- Parent: State Bank of India (100% owned)

State Bank of Hyderabad (SBH) was a regional bank India, with its headquarters at Gunfoundry, Abids, Hyderabad, Telangana. Founded by the 7th Nizam of Hyderabad State, Mir Osman Ali Khan, it is now one of the five associate banks of State Bank of India (SBI) and was one of the nationalised banks in India. It was established on 8 February 1941, as the Hyderabad State Bank. From 1956 until 31 March 2017, it had been the largest associate bank of the SBI. After formation of Telangana in 2014, SBH was the lead bank of the newly created state. The State Bank of Hyderabad was merged with State Bank of India on 1 April 2017.

SBH had over 2,000 branches and about 18,000 employees. The bank's business had crossed Rs. 2.4 trillion as on 31.12.2015 with a net profit of Rs. 8.12 billion.

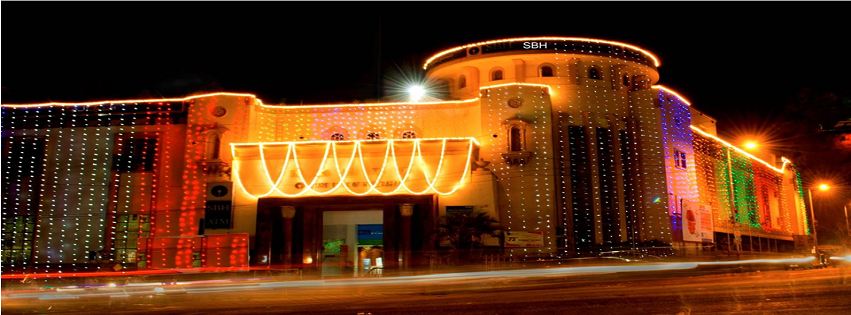
SBH Head Office at Gunfoundry

The bank had performed well in the decades before merger, winning several awards for its banking practices. Arundhati Bhattacharya was the chairman and Mani Palvesan the managing director at the time of merger.

It was the chief banker of Telangana.

== History ==
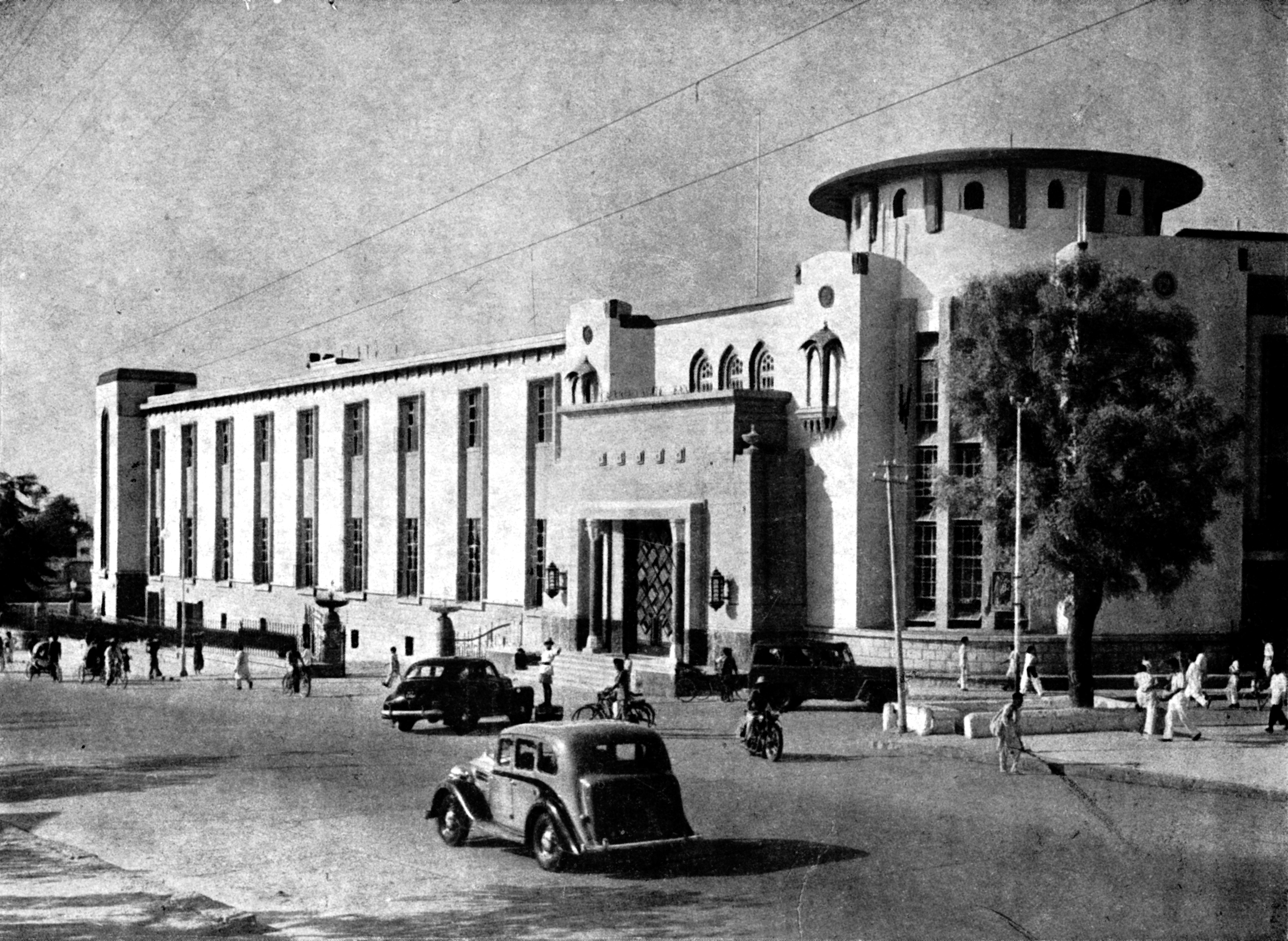
SBH Head Office at Gunfoundry in 1955

The bank was the central bank of the erstwhile Nizam state under the name Hyderabad State Bank. It was established on 8 August 1941 under the Hyderabad State Bank Act, during the reign of the last Nizam of Hyderabad, Mir Osman Ali Khan. Fifty-one per cent of the bank's share capital was held by the Government of Hyderabad and the rest by private shareholders. The bank managed the Osmania Sicca, the currency of Hyderabad state, which covered the present-day Telangana, some districts later known as Hyderabad-Karnataka of Karnataka and Marathwada of Maharashtra. The bank also carried out commercial banking. The bank opened its first branch at Gunfoundry, Hyderabad on 5 April 1942. The Imperial Bank of India, which had established a branch in Hyderabad in 1868 and another in Secunderabad in 1906, provided officers and clerical staff in the initial stages, and later provided training for new recruits. The first secretary of Hyderabad State Bank was Muhammad Saleh Akbar Hydari, son of Sir Akbar Hydari. The first branch of the bank was set up at Gunfoundry on 5 April 1942. The building housing the branch was designed by Mohammed Fayazuddin, an alumnus of Architectural Association School of Architecture, London.

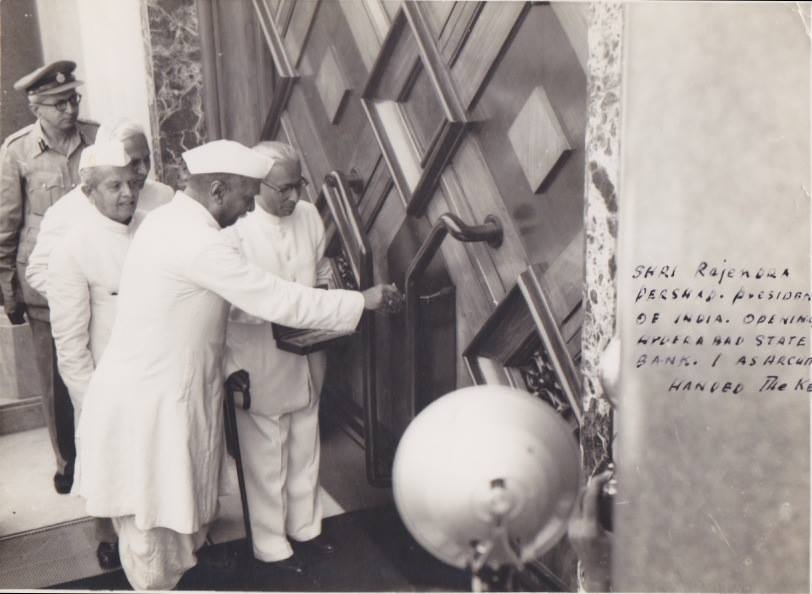
Inauguration of new building of Hyderabad State Bank by Rajendra Prasad, the first president of India

By 1950 when Hyderabad State became a part of India, the bank had around 50 branches spread over various parts of the then Hyderabad State i.e. present day Telangana, parts of Maharashtra and Karnataka.

In 1953, the bank absorbed, by merger, the Mercantile Bank of Hyderabad, which Raja Pannalal Pitti had founded in 1935. (Some accounts give the year of founding as 1946 and that of merger as 1952). In the same year, the Bank started conducting government and Treasury business as agent for the Reserve Bank of India.

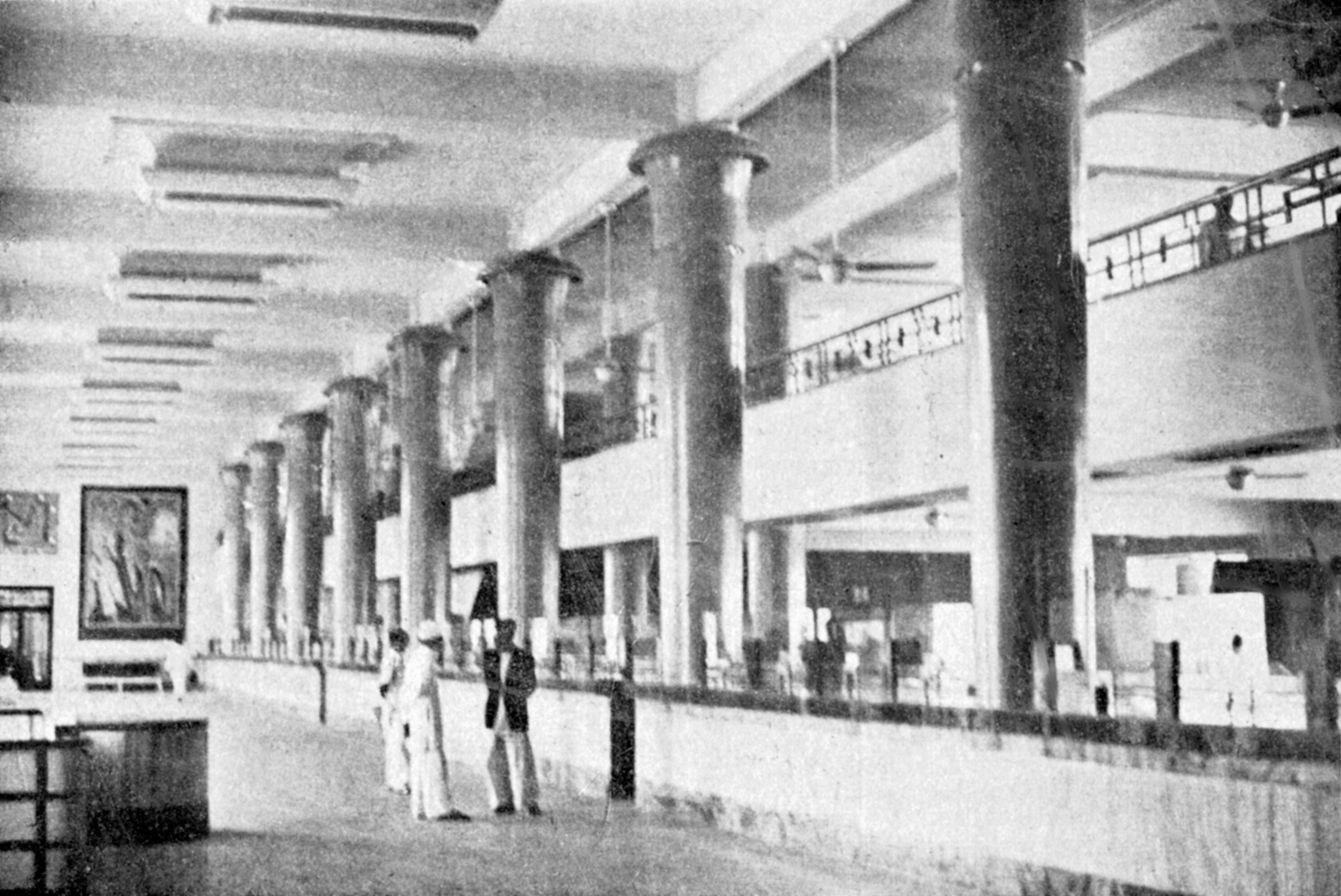
The interiors of SBH Head Office at Gunfoundry in 1955

In 1956, under The State Bank Of Hyderabad Act, 1956 share capital of the Hyderabad State Bank was transferred to the Reserve Bank of India. The Reserve Bank of India took over the bank as its first subsidiary and it was renamed as State Bank of Hyderabad. That same year saw the break-up of Hyderabad State. Aurangabad, Beed, Parbhani, Nanded and Osmanabad merged with Maharashtra state. Kalaburagi, Bidar, Raichur, and parts of Osmanabad were merged with Karnataka. The remaining districts formed part of Andhra Pradesh, until the formation in 2015–16 of the state of Telangana. After the trifurcation, the branches of Hyderabad State Bank continued to conduct government transactions in their new states as well.

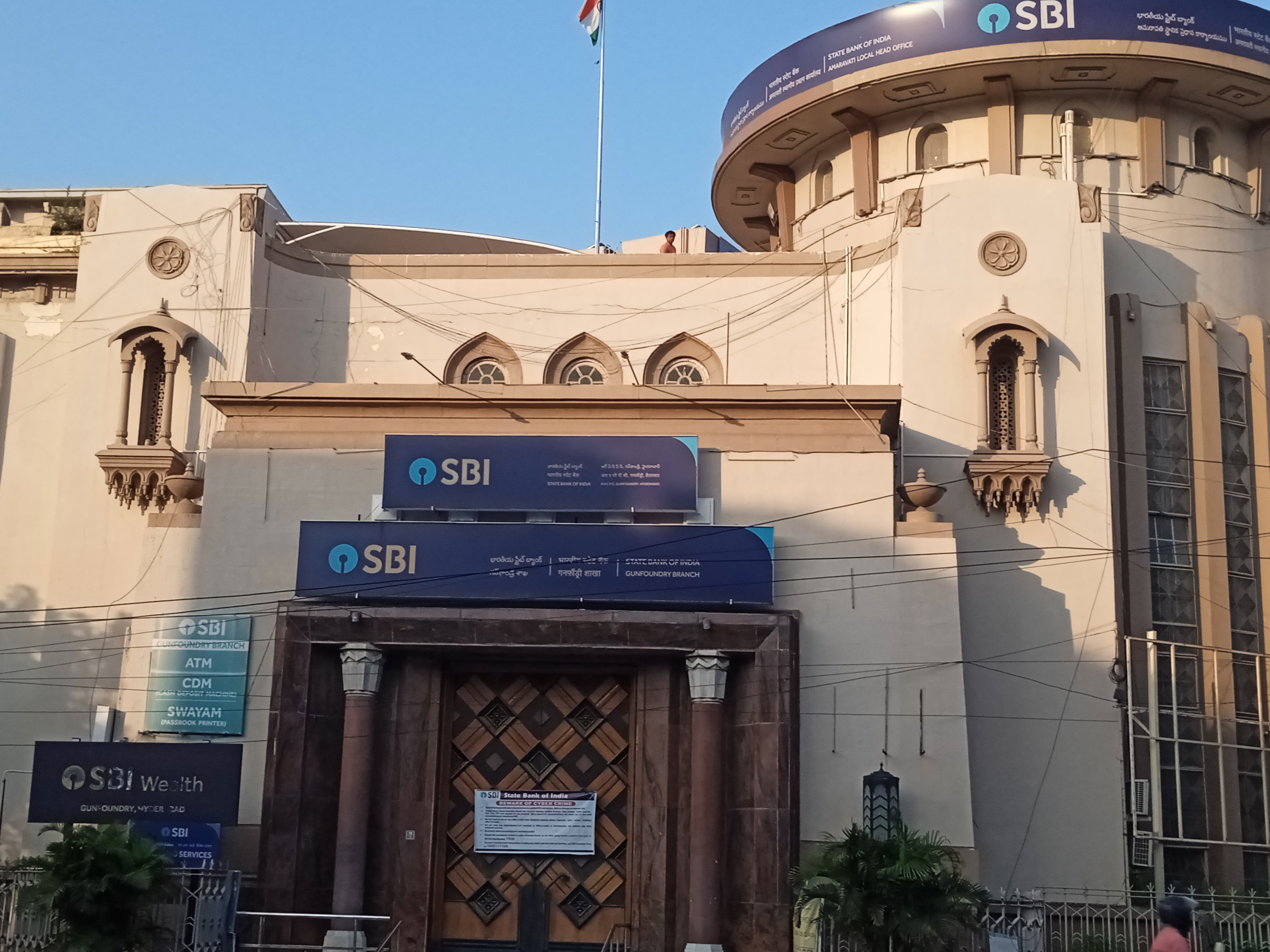
SBH Head Office at Gunfoundry post merger with SBI

The Subsidiary Banks Act was passed in 1959. On 1 October 1959, SBH and the other banks of the princely states became subsidiaries of SBI.

== Merger ==
The plans to make SBI one of the top 50 banks in the World affected SBH. This plan was introduced in 2016, and on 15 February 2017, the Government of India ratified it. SBH finally merged with SBI on 31 March 2017, along with its co-associates State Bank of Travancore, State Bank of Mysore, State Bank of Patiala, State Bank of Bikaner and Jaipur, and Bharatiya Mahila Bank.

== See also ==
- Indian banking
- List of banks in India
- Hyderabadi rupee
