= Worplesdon Place Hotel, Guildford =

Historic house, now a hotel

Coordinates: 51°16′30.1″N 0°36′27.7″W

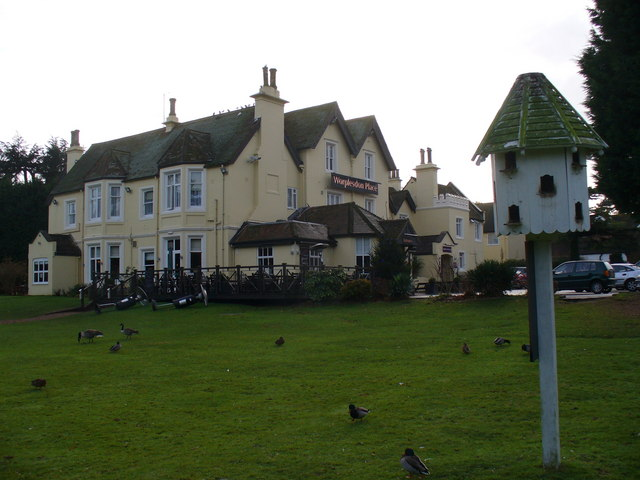
Worplesdon Place Hotel.

Worplesdon Place Hotel near Guildford, Surrey is a house of historical significance. It appears to have been built in about 1845 by Sir William Bovill. It was a private residence for the next 100 years and was owned by several notable people. In the 1950s it became a hotel and still operates in this manner today. The hotel provides accommodation and restaurant facilities and caters for special events particularly weddings.

== Sir William Bovill and Lady Maria Bovill ==
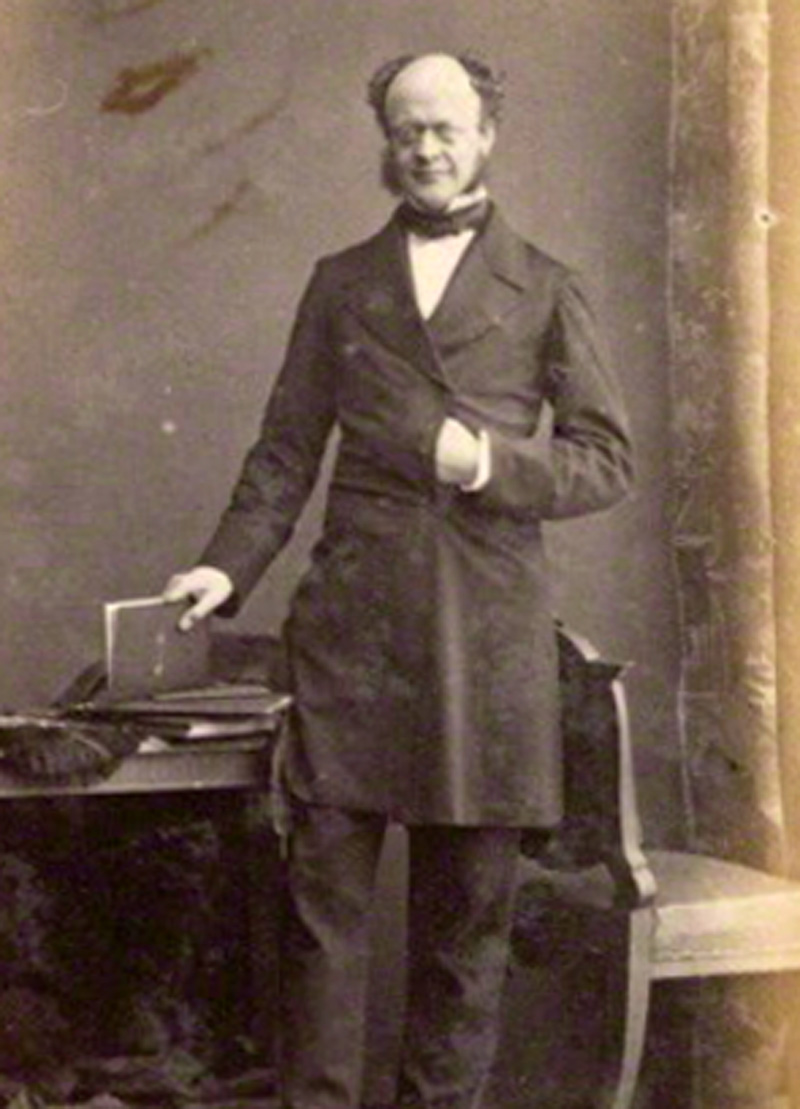
Sir William Bovill.

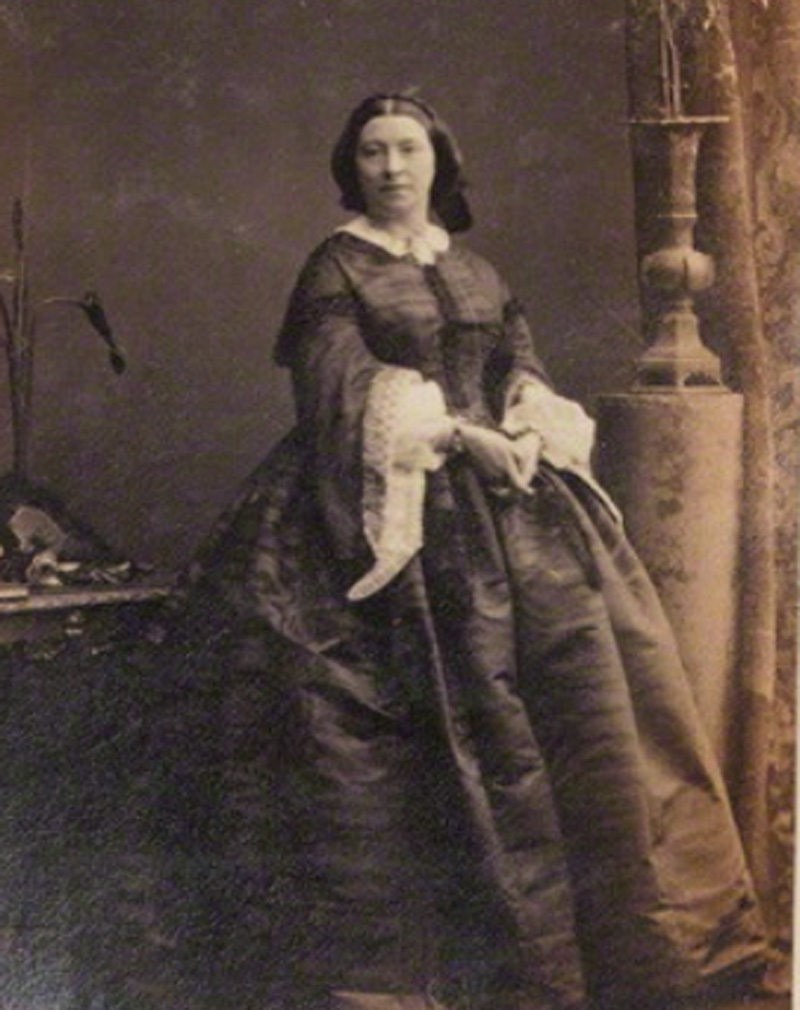
Lady Maria Bovill.

William Bovill was born in 1814 in Barking Essex. His father was Benjamin Bovill of Durnford Lodge in Wimbledon. He began his legal career as an article clerk in London and was called to the bar in 1841. In 1844 he married Maria Bolton of Lee Park in Blackheath. It seems it was about this time that he built Worplesdon Lodge (later renamed Worplesdon Place) as there is a record of a donation given by Maria in 1845 which she records her address as Worplesdon Lodge, Guildford.

William became a QC in 1855 and was elected Member of Parliament for Guildford in 1857. In 1866 he was appointed Solicitor-General and shortly after became a Chief Justice. Bovill became famous throughout the country as the judge in the Tichborne trial. This was one of the most celebrated cases of the Victorian period which concerned the claim of a man to be Roger the long-lost son of the wealthy Tichbornes. William dismissed his claim and ordered that he be indicted for perjury.

William and Maria had eight children and Worplesdon Lodge became their country estate. The newspapers record frequent fund raising bazaars in the grounds of their house. It appears that in the 1860s the property was fairly substantial as at one event the house is referred to as a mansion and it is mentioned that there is a hall adjoining the mansion in which 120 children were entertained on this occasion. In about 1868 they sold the property to Joseph Hornby Baxendale.

== Joseph and Elizabeth Baxendale ==
Joseph Hornby Baxendale was born in 1817 in Lancashire. He was aged about 50 and a very wealthy man when he bought Worplesdon Lodge. He was head of the firm Pickfords and Company which was a large courier firm and still exists today. He continued to call the property Worplesdon Lodge for several years and then in the early 1870s changed the name to Worplesdon Place. It is likely that he made substantial additions to the house and constructed the ornamental pond as in 1887 the sale advertisement for the house states that it now has 22 bedrooms and dressing rooms.

In 1846 he married Elizabeth Mary Brockedon who was the daughter of the famous painter William Brockedon. The couple had two children. Their son also called Joseph lived in Worplesdon at a house called “The Firs” for many years.

In 1886 Joseph died and his wife died the following year. The house was advertised for sale and bought by Sir Richard Charles Garton.

== Sir Richard Charles Garton and Lady Ellen Garton ==
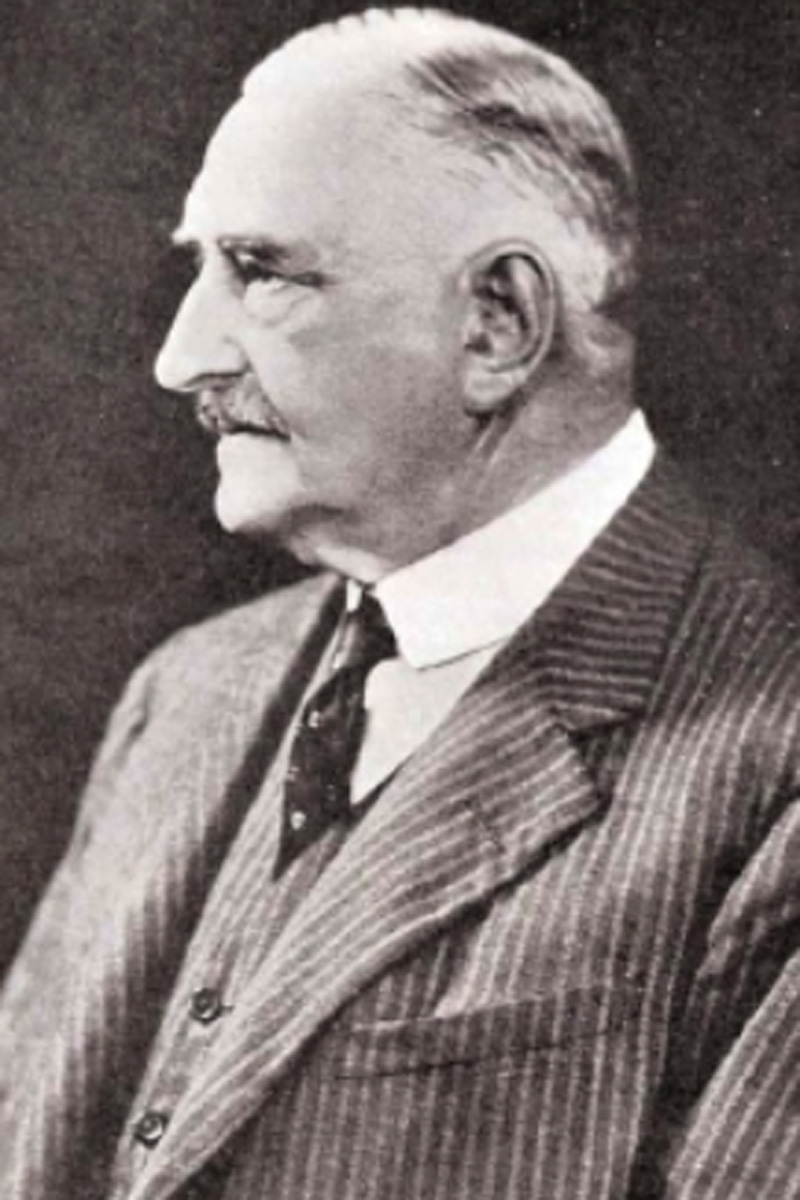
Sir Richard Garton.

Richard Garton and Ellen lived in the house from 1887 until about 1902. Richard was born in 1857 in Bristol. His father William Garton was in the brewing firm Manbre and Garton and when Richard finished his degree at University he joined the firm and became a pioneer in the manufacture of liquid glucose. He became involved in the brewing industry and was the Director of several companies including Manbre and Garton and also Garton, Sons and Co. He became extremely wealthy.

In 1883 he married Ellen Durrant who was the daughter of Andrew Durrant of Bishops Hall Chelmsford. The couple had two daughters. He was knighted in 1908 and obtained a GBE in 1918.

Richard was a well-known philanthropist. In 1912 he established the Garton Foundation for the study of international relations. He also founded the British Empire Cancer Campaign and donated large sums of money to their work. When Ellen died in 1925 he built the children’s ward of the Haslemere Hospital in memory of her and later added the nurse’s hostel.

In about 1902 he sold Worplesdon Place and bought a large house in Haslemere where he lived for the next 32 years. When he died in 1934 he left over £2.5 million, which is the equivalent to about £150 million in 2020.

== Sir James Lewis Walker and Lady Catherine Featherston Walker ==
Sir James Walker bought Worplesdon Place in about 1905 and lived there until his death in 1927. James was born in India in 1845 and lived there for most of his adult life. He was part of the British administration in India at this time. His father was John Walker who worked in the Punjab Police. James had a very distinguished career in India. He established the Alliance Bank of Simla, where he lived. He was also a newspaper proprietor of two Indian periodicals.

He was a personal friend of Rudyard Kipling, who mentions Walker in his autobiography. Kipling lived with Walker and his first wife Lizzie in Shimla when Kipling was a child. James was Kipling’s first patron and assisted him to become a writer. Kipling maintained the friendship throughout his life and visited Walker at Worplesden Place in 1911. When James died in 1927 Kipling sent a letter of condolence to Catherine Featherston Walker, James’s second wife, outlining his gratitude and affection for her husband.

When James died in 1927 Catherine his wife continued to live at Worplesdon for two years and then sold the property in 1929.
