= Punjab Banking Company =

Indian bank

The Punjab Banking Company
- Company type: Private sector
- Industry: Banking, Insurance, Capital Markets and allied industries
- Founded: 1 May 1889 as The Punjab Banking Company
- Founder: David Parkes Masson
- Defunct: 31 March 1916
- Fate: merged with the Alliance Bank of Simla
- Successor: Alliance Bank of Simla
- Headquarters: Lahore, India
- Number of locations: Punjab province
- Area served: India
- Products: Deposits, Personal Banking Schemes, C & I Banking Schemes, Agri Banking Schemes, SME Banking Schemes
- Services: Banking, Trade Finance
- Parent: Alliance Bank of Simla

The Punjab Banking Company (1889) was a bank founded in the year 1889 in British India. The bank became defunct in the year 1916, when it was acquired by the Alliance Bank of Simla.

== History ==
=== Founding ===
The Punjab Banking Company was founded by Sir David Parkes Masson in the year 1889.

The bank's customers were located in the Punjab province of British India.

=== Management ===
The bank was staffed by mostly British nationals who were drawn mainly from the East India Company.

The bank was headquartered in Lahore city in the Punjab province.

=== Final years ===
The bank had branches in Abbottabad, Dalhousie, Ferozepore, Jullundar, Karachi, Cantonment [sic], Multan, Naushera (in the North-west Frontier province), Quetta, Peshawar, Sialkot, Simla, and Srinagar.

In 1916, the bank was finally merged with the Alliance Bank of Simla.

== Legacy ==
The bank is notable for being one of the oldest banks in India.

The bank is also notable for being one of the precursors of the State Bank of India, through its predecessor the Alliance Bank of Simla.

== See also ==
- Indian banking
- List of banks in India
