= Victoria Public Hall =

Building in India

Coordinates: 13.08192°N 80.2726°E

- Town Hall
- The Victoria Public Hall

General information
- Type: Public building
- Architectural style: Indo-Saracenic
- Location: Poonamallee High Road, Chennai, India, Park Town, Chennai, Tamil Nadu 600 003
- Construction started: 1886
- Completed: 1888–1890
- Inaugurated: 1888–1890
- Cost: ₹ 16,425
- Owner: Corporation of Chennai
- Operator: Victoria Public Hall Trust

Height
- Height: 34 m (112 ft)
- Roof: 19 m (62 ft)

Technical details
- Floor count: 3
- Floor area: 25,883 sq ft (2,000 m^{2})

Design and construction
- Architect: Robert Fellowes Chisholm
- Structural engineer: Namperumal Chetty

Victoria Public Hall, or the Town Hall, is a historical building in Chennai, named after Victoria, Empress of India. It is one of the finest examples of British architecture in Chennai and was built to commemorate the Golden Jubilee of Queen Victoria. In the late 19th and early 20th centuries, it was used as a theater and a place for public gatherings. The South Indian Athletic Association Club now resides there.

== Description ==
The building is located on EVR Periyar Salai near Moore Market and between Ripon Building and Chennai Central Railway Station. Constructed with red brick and painted with lime mortar, the rectangular building has an Italianate tower capped by a Travancore-style roof. The ground floor of the building has a built-up area of 13,342 sq ft and the first floor has a built-up area of 12,541 sq ft. The two large halls in the ground and the first floors were built to accommodate 600 persons each, while a wooden gallery in the eastern end has seating arrangement for more than 200 persons. The structure consists of arcaded verandahs along the northern and southern sides in the hall on the first floor supported on sleek Corinthian stone columns, a square tower that is three storeys high, and a carved pyramidal roof. There is also an intricately carved terracotta cornice, which resembles Islamic calligraphy, atop the tower. The hall has four staircases, of which three lead to the hall on the first floor and one to the balcony, and four turrets.

The Trevelyan Fountain, a memorial fountain in the grounds of the hall, was raised to mark the contribution of Charles Trevelyan, Governor of Madras during 1859-1860 and the developer of the People's Park, towards providing the city with adequate drinking water. On one side of the fountain is a bas relief of Trevelyan's head.

== History ==
In a meeting held in March 1882 at the Pachaiyappa's Hall in George Town by some leading citizens, the decision to construct a town hall for Madras was taken. This resulted in the mobilisation of a sum of ₹ 16,425 from around 30 persons who attended the meeting, and a 12-member trust was formed for the execution of the project. The municipal corporation leased a 57-ground (3.14 acres) site in the People's Park to the Victoria Public Hall Trust for 99 years effective from 1 April 1886 at a lease rent of eight annas a ground or ₹ 28 for the property. The then Maharajah of Vizianagaram, Sir Pusapati Ananda Gajapati Raju, who laid the foundation stone for the new building on 17 December 1883, also led a list of 35 donors for the construction work with a contribution of ₹ 10,000. The list included the Travancore Maharajah (₹ 8,000), Mysore Maharajah, Pudukottai Rajah and former Madras High Court Judge Muthuswamy Iyer (all ₹ 1,000 each) and P.Orr and Sons, a city-based watch company (₹ 1,400). Other contributors included Ramnad Raja Bhaskara Setupati, Zamindar of Ettiapuram and Hadji Abdul Batcha Sahib. It took about five years to complete the construction.

The hall, an example of Indo-Saracenic architecture, was designed by Robert Fellowes Chisholm (1840–1915) in the Romanesque style and was built by Namperumal Chetty between 1888 and 1890. It was opened to the public by Lord Connemara in 1887, all three being freemasons, a Masonic Ball was held at the place for installation of Lord Connemara as Grand Master of District Grand Lodge of Madras.

Another version suggests that Sir Mountstuart Elphinstone Grant Duff, the governor of Madras during 1886–1890, declared open the hall. In January 1888, a citizens' meeting decided to name the hall after Queen Victoria. The then Municipal Corporation President Sir A.T. Arundale took the initiative.

The hall soon become a venue of important public and social events. Several eminent personalities, including Mahatma Gandhi and Swami Vivekananda, have visited the hall. National leaders like Swami Vivekananda, Gopal Krishna Gokhale, and Sardar Vallabhai Patel have addressed meetings in the hall. The pioneers of Tamil play, such as Sankaradoss Swamigal and Pammal Sambanda Mudaliar, have staged their plays at the hall.

The Suguna Vilasa Sabha (SVS), founded in 1891, was most closely associated with the hall. It conducted the first evening drama shows in Madras. In October 1906, the play Kaadalar Kangal was staged at the hall. For the next 30 years, the Sabha remained at the hall and later, built its own theatre on acquisition of 36 grounds next to Christ Church on Anna Salai and now functions only as a social club.

The Justice Party was established on 20 November 1916 in the hall and it is seen as the start of the Dravidian Movement.

It was there that the first cinema show was held in Chennai. T. Stevenson, proprietor of the Madras Photographic Store, ran some shows that consisted of ten short films.

As the city grew southward and the medium of cinema acquired greater popularity, the building gradually went out of public attention. The lease expired in 1985 and a legal battle ensued as the Corporation did not want to extend the lease. With a compromise being reached in the matter, a petition to that effect was submitted in the court and decision was taken to take action against sub-leases. The land of the hall was occupied by several organisations before the 2010 renovation. The Andhra Mahila Sabha was functioning from a building behind the hall. The building occupied 5.25 grounds of land belonging to Victoria Public Hall. The building was demolished as part of the 2010 renovation. Hotel Picnic, a private hotel, had acquired 13 grounds from the Victoria Public Hall Trust through a sub-lease that expired on 30 April 1985. The hotel has been paying a monthly rent of ₹ 4,000 to the corporation. In 2010, the Supreme Court ordered the hotel to hand over the land to the Corporation of Chennai. About 32 shops that had encroached upon the land belonging to the hall were also removed as part of the renovation.

=== Renovations ===
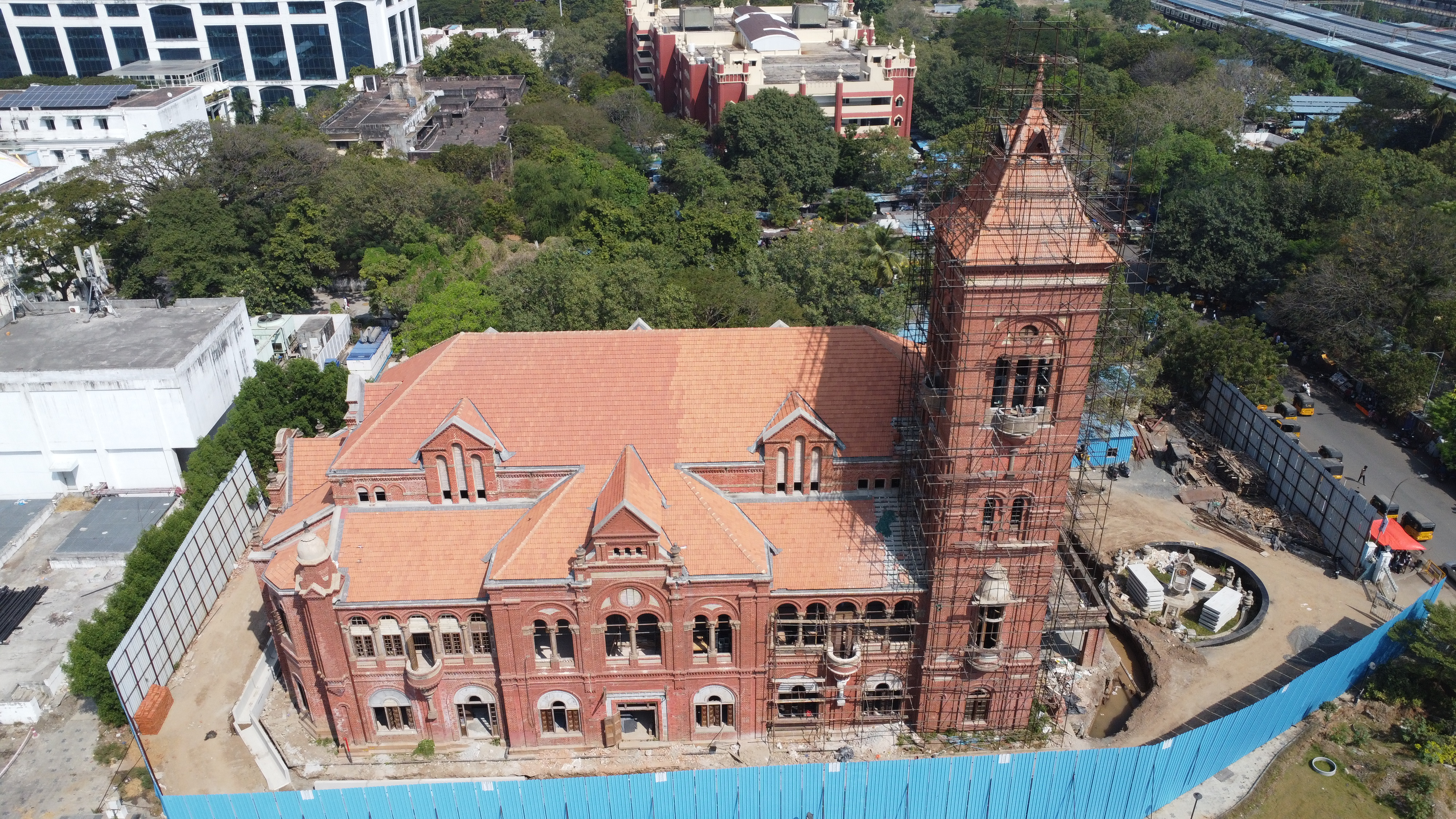
Victoria Public Hall renovation in 2025 aerial view

Renovation work of the hall was first carried out in October 1967 and the then Chief Minister C.N.Annadurai dedicated it for public use. After a few years, the building remained closed for over 40 years. In early 1990s, Suresh Krishna, the then Sheriff of Madras, took some efforts in salvaging a part of the building, and restored the Trevelyan Fountain. The former Maharashtra Governor C. Subramaniam rededicated the building in December 1993.

The Corporation of Chennai started renovating the hall in April 2009 at a cost of ₹ 39.6 million, under the Jawaharlal Nehru National Urban Renewal Mission. A sound and light show was to be conducted on the ground floor upon completion of the works. The first floor was refurbished for cultural programmes, the hall fitted for a seating capacity of 600 persons. The work was completed in 2012.

== See also ==
- Architecture of Chennai
- Heritage structures in Chennai
