= SBI General Insurance =

Indian general insurance company pvt ltd

SBI General Insurance Company Limited
- Type: Private
- Industry: Financial services
- Founded: 2009; 17 years ago
- Headquarters: Mumbai, India
- Area served: Worldwide
- Key people: Naveen Chandra Jha (MD & CEO); Anand Pejawar (Deputy Managing Director)
- Products: Health insurance; Vehicle insurance; Accident insurance; Travel insurance; Home insurance; Aviation insurance; Fire insurance; Liability insurance; Crop insurance
- Number of employees: 7026
- Parent: State Bank of India (69.95%)
- Website: www.sbigeneral.in

SBI General Insurance Company Limited is a general insurance company founded in 2009. It started operations in 2010 and is headquartered in Mumbai, India.

The company offers a range of general insurance products including insurance for automobile, home, personal accident, travel, energy, marine, property and casualty as well as specialized financial lines.

Since 2009, the company has expanded significantly, from 17 branches in 2011 to over 143 locations nationally.

== History ==
SBI General Insurance was founded in 2009. It started operations in 2010, as a joint venture between State Bank of India (SBI) and Insurance Australia Group (IAG).

In September 2018, the company sold a 4 per cent stake to Axis Asset Management Company and Premji Invest for ₹4.82 billion (US$50 million) crore.

In October 2019, IAG sold its entire stake of 26 per cent for US$310 million (₹2,325 crore). Out of this, 16.01 per cent stake was acquired by Napean Opportunities LLP (an affiliate of Premji Invest) and the remaining 9.99 per cent stake was acquired by Warburg Pincus. The same year, the company partnered with PolicyBazaar to sell travel insurance to overseas travellers and announced Bancassurance tie-Up with Karnataka Gramin Bank.

== Financials ==
SBI General Insurance recorded considerable growth in FY 2023-24, with a 17% increase in Gross Written Premium (GWP) to INR 12,731 crores.

== Product and Services ==
SBI General offers a range of insurance policies in many business lines. It has products for the retail segments like, health insurance, motor insurance, home insurance, travel insurance, personal accident insurance and new age products like cyber insurance. The company also has corporate products like fire insurance, marine insurance, liability insurance and property insurance. They also offer products for rural people like crop insurance and cattle insurance.

== Recognition and other activities ==
SBI General has received accolades for its products, services and CSR initiatives, including the FICCI Insurance Industry Awards, awards organized by Outlook Money, Business Today – Money Today, ICC Social Impact Awards and InsureNext Awards.

Under the CSR programme, SBI General has been associating with various NGOs and programs to serve the most vulnerable communities by contributing to various areas such as health, road safety, sanitation, education, sustainability and livelihoods.

== See also ==
- SBI Capital Markets
- SBI Cards
