= T. Namberumal Chetty =

Indian businessman (1856–1925)

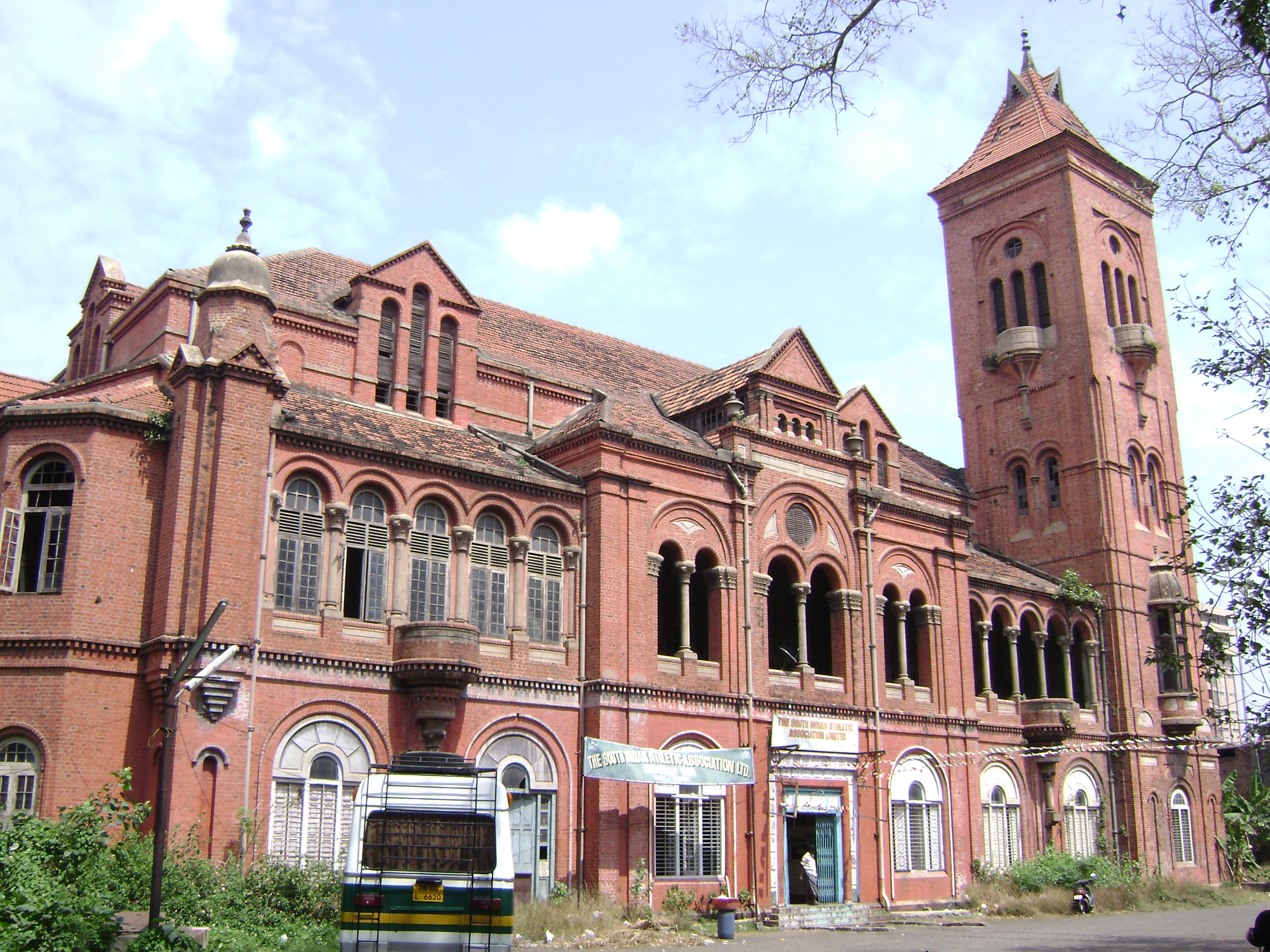
Victoria Public Hall is among the Chennai buildings that Chetty erected.

Diwan Bahadur Thaticonda Namberumal Chetty (c. 1856 – 3 December 1925) was an Indian contractor, engineer, builder and businessman who constructed a number of public buildings in the city of Madras in the late 19th and early 20th centuries.

== Career ==
Namberumal Chetty was born in Madras (now Chennai) in 1856. He belonged to a Komati Chetty family. Namberumal Chetty started his business as a builder in 1880. During his career, Chetty constructed the buildings of the Government Museum, Chennai, Victoria Technical Institute, YMCA, Madras Law College, Connemara Library, Bank of Madras and the Victoria Memorial Hall. The National Bank of India building that he constructed in 1914 was demolished in the late 20th century. Many of the buildings constructed by Chetty use red brick manufactured in kilns that Chetty owned.

Apart from building activities, Chetty was also a popular merchant and imported timber from Rangoon and Moulmein. He served as the managing director of the Trichur Timber and Saw Mills Ltd. which exported timber to Bombay, Calcutta, Colombo, London, Liverpool, Germany, New York and South Africa. He also owned the Trivellore Light Railway, a small tramway line which functioned as a feeder to the Madras and Southern Mahratta Railway. In 1936, the railway owned one locomotive, three railcars, 14 coaches and one goods wagon.

== Legacy and honours ==
In November 1901, Namberumal Chetty was awarded the title of "Rao Sahib". Later he was awarded a "Rao Bahadur" title and in 1923, a "Diwan Bahadur" title was bestowed upon him. At the opening of the Victoria Students Hostel on 29 January 1900, Sir Arthur Havelock, governor of Madras said:

Mr. Namberumal Chetty will have his name recorded in Madras with many small and beautiful buildings in stone, brick and mortar. It should be a proud remembrance for him and his descendants that he has so much to do with the beautifying of the city

Namberumal Chetty was also the first native Indian in Madras city to own an automobile.
