= The Bank of Upper India =

Bank in India

- Company type: Private sector
- Industry: Banking, Insurance, Capital Markets and allied industries
- Founded: 1 May 1863 as The Bank of Upper India
- Defunct: 31 March 1913
- Fate: merged with the Alliance Bank of Simla
- Successor: Alliance Bank of Simla
- Headquarters: Meerut, India
- Number of locations: United Provinces
- Area served: India
- Products: Deposits, Personal Banking Schemes, C & I Banking Schemes, Agri Banking Schemes, SME Banking Schemes
- Services: Banking, Trade Finance
- Parent: Alliance Bank of Simla

The Bank of Upper India (1863) was a bank founded in the year 1863 in British India. The bank became defunct in the year 1913, when it was acquired by the Alliance Bank of Simla.

== History ==
=== Founding ===
The Bank of Upper India was founded in 1863.

The bank was mentioned several times in British Parliamentary debates.

=== Management ===
The bank was staffed by mostly British nationals who were drawn mainly from the East India Company.

The bank was headquartered in Meerut city in the United Provinces.

=== Final years ===
In 1911, the bank was on the verge of failure and it was decided to merge the bank with the Alliance Bank of Simla.

In 1913, the bank was finally merged with the Alliance Bank of Simla.

== Legacy ==
The bank is notable for being one of the oldest banks in India.

The bank is also notable for being one of the precursors of the State Bank of India, through its predecessor the Alliance Bank of Simla.

== See also ==
- Indian banking
- List of banks in India
