= Delhi and London Bank =

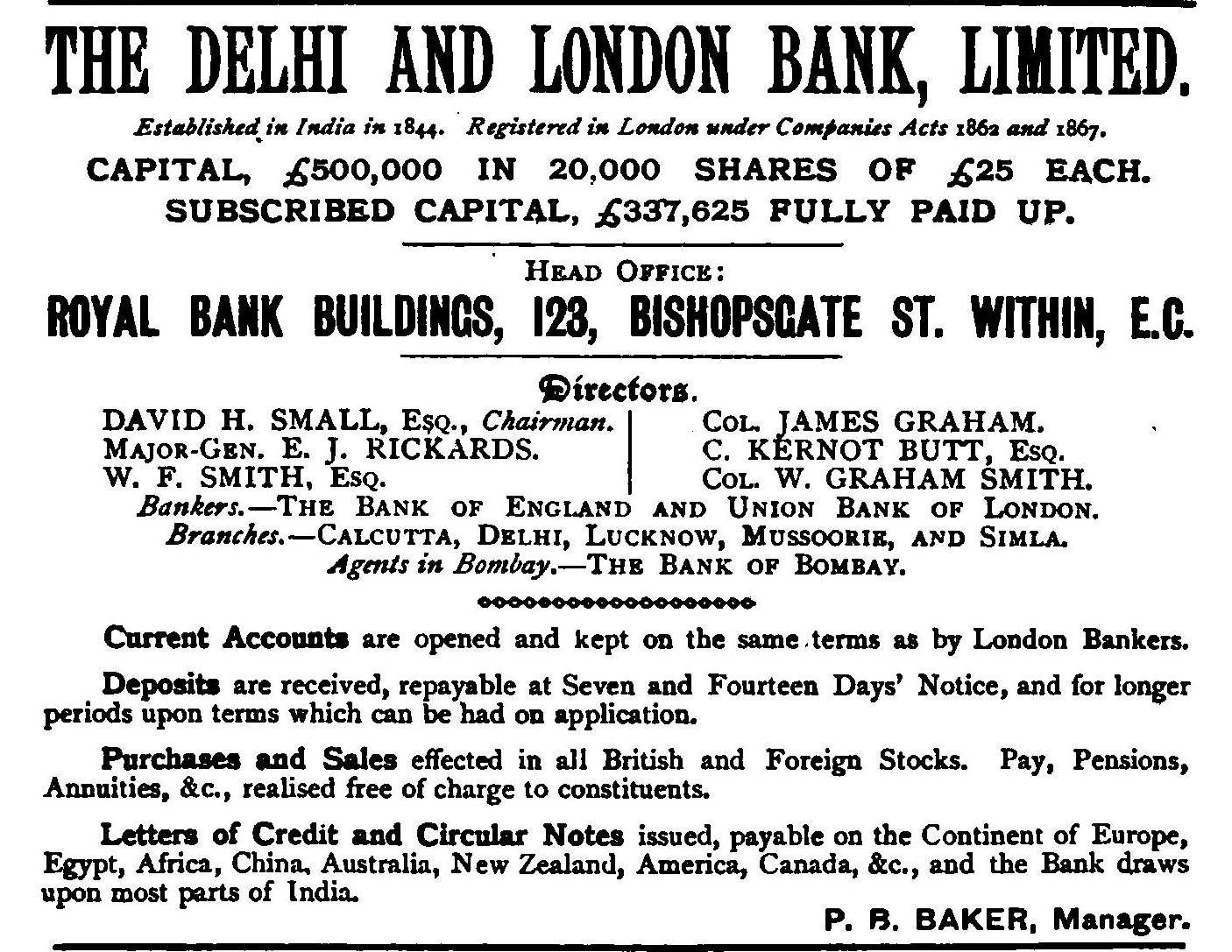
A 1902 advertisement

The Delhi and London Bank was a bank that operated in British India.

== History ==
=== Founding ===
It was originally incorporated as the Delhi Banking Corporation in India in 1844 and under this better known name in London in 1865.

=== Final years ===
The bank separated in 1916 with many of the Indian branches merging into the Alliance Bank of Simla (established in 1874) and the London branch was bought by the Boulton Brothers. The bank was liquidated in 1924 following failure.

== Legacy ==
The bank is notable for being the twenty-seventh oldest bank in India.

== See also ==
- List of banks that have merged to form the State Bank of India
