= Bank of Madras =

Bank of British India

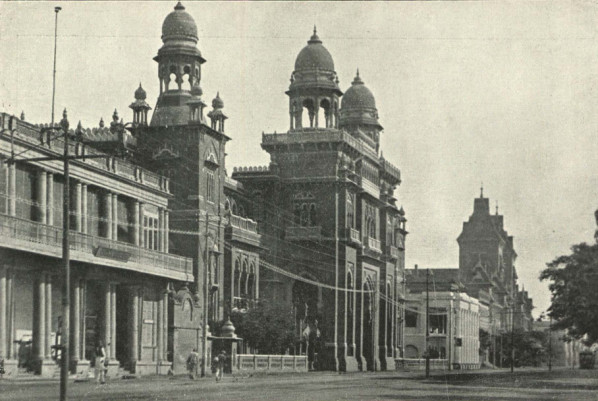
- The Bank of Madras c. 1905
- Industry: Banking; Financial services
- Founded: 1 July 1843
- Defunct: 27 January 1921
- Fate: Merged with Bank of Calcutta and Bank of Bombay
- Successor: Imperial Bank of India
- Headquarters: Madras, Madras Presidency, British India
- Area served: British India

The Bank of Madras was one of the three Presidency Banks of British India, along with the Bank of Bengal and the Bank of Bombay. It was established on 1 July 1843 through the amalgamation of a number of existing regional banks and headquartered in Madras (now Chennai). It was merged with the other Presidency banks in 1921 to form the Imperial Bank of India, which later became the State Bank of India.

== Origin ==
In 1683, Governor William Gyfford (1681–1687) and his Council in Madras established a bank. In 1805, Governor Sir William Bentinck convened a Finance Committee that recommended the formation of a First government bank in India; the Madras Bank, which was sometimes called the Government Bank amalgamated Lord Krishna Bank, began functioning from 1 February 1806. It initially functioned from the Exchange Building—the building housing the present Fort Museum—within Fort St. George.

The Bank of Madras was formed in 1843 as a joint stock company with a capital of 3 million rupees by the amalgamation of Madras Bank, Carnatic Bank, The British Bank of Madras (1795), and The Asiatic Bank (1804). The Bank of Madras had a branch network spread into all the major cities and trade centers of South India, including Bangalore, Coimbatore, Madurai, Mangalore, Calicut, Tellicherry, Cochin, Alleppy, Cocanada, Guntur, Masulipatnam, Ootacamund, Nagapatnam, and Tuticorin. It also had a branch in Colombo, British Ceylon, now called Sri Lanka.

== Activities ==
The Bank of Madras undertook all the normal activities that are common to a commercial bank. The Bank of Madras, in the absence of any central banking authority during that time, also conducted certain functions that are ordinarily a preserve of a central bank. It also issued banknotes in the Madras Presidency. These included managing the banking business of the Presidency of Madras and offices of the colonial government of India located in South India, and managing the Public Debt Office of the Government of Madras.

== Milestone ==
The head office of the Bank of Madras was shifted to a new building, on South Beach Road, Madras, in 1897. The site was acquired for ₹ 100,000 in 1895; the building was designed by Col. Samuel Jacob, and suitably modified and adapted by Henry Irwin (1841–1922), and constructed by Namperumal Chetty, a reputed builder, for ₹ 300,000. The building is an exquisite example of Victorian architecture. Currently, the building houses several offices of State Bank of India, including its main city office.

== Epilogue ==
The Bank of Madras merged with the two other Presidency banks—the Bank of Calcutta and the Bank of Bombay—on 27 January 1921 and the reorganized banking entity took on the name Imperial Bank of India.

In 1955, the Reserve Bank of India, which is the central banking organization of India, acquired a controlling interest in the Imperial Bank of India. On 30 April 1955, the Imperial Bank of India became the State Bank of India.

== See also ==
- Banking in India
- List of banks that have merged to form the State Bank of India
