= Alliance Bank of Simla =

Defunct bank of India

The Alliance Bank of Simla was a British-run though India-registered bank that commenced operations in Simla in 1874 under the management of James Lewis Walker. The bank was established to take over the business of the United Bank of India, established in 1866, which had operations in Simla and Umballa. Its board put the United Bank of India in voluntary liquidation on 21 March 1874, and Alliance Bank commenced operations two days later. After 49 years, Alliance Bank failed on 27 April 1923 due to speculation by its management. At the time that it failed it had 36 branches, including ones in Lahore, Lucknow, Peshawar, Rawalpindi, and Rangoon.

== History ==
Alliance Bank expanded by taking over the operations of other failed banks. By doing so it was able to extend its branch network and reduce the competition that some of its branches faced.

It was the liquidator for Punjab Bank (est. 1862), and subsequently opened branches at Murree (10 July 1877), Rawalpindi (6 August 1877), and Lahore (16 January 1878). Alliance Bank then opened branches at Umballa on 14 July 1885 and Cawnpore on 1 December 1887. Branches in Calcutta (15 October 1889), Ajmere (2 February 1891), Agra (1 February 1894), and Bombay (16 February 1903) followed.

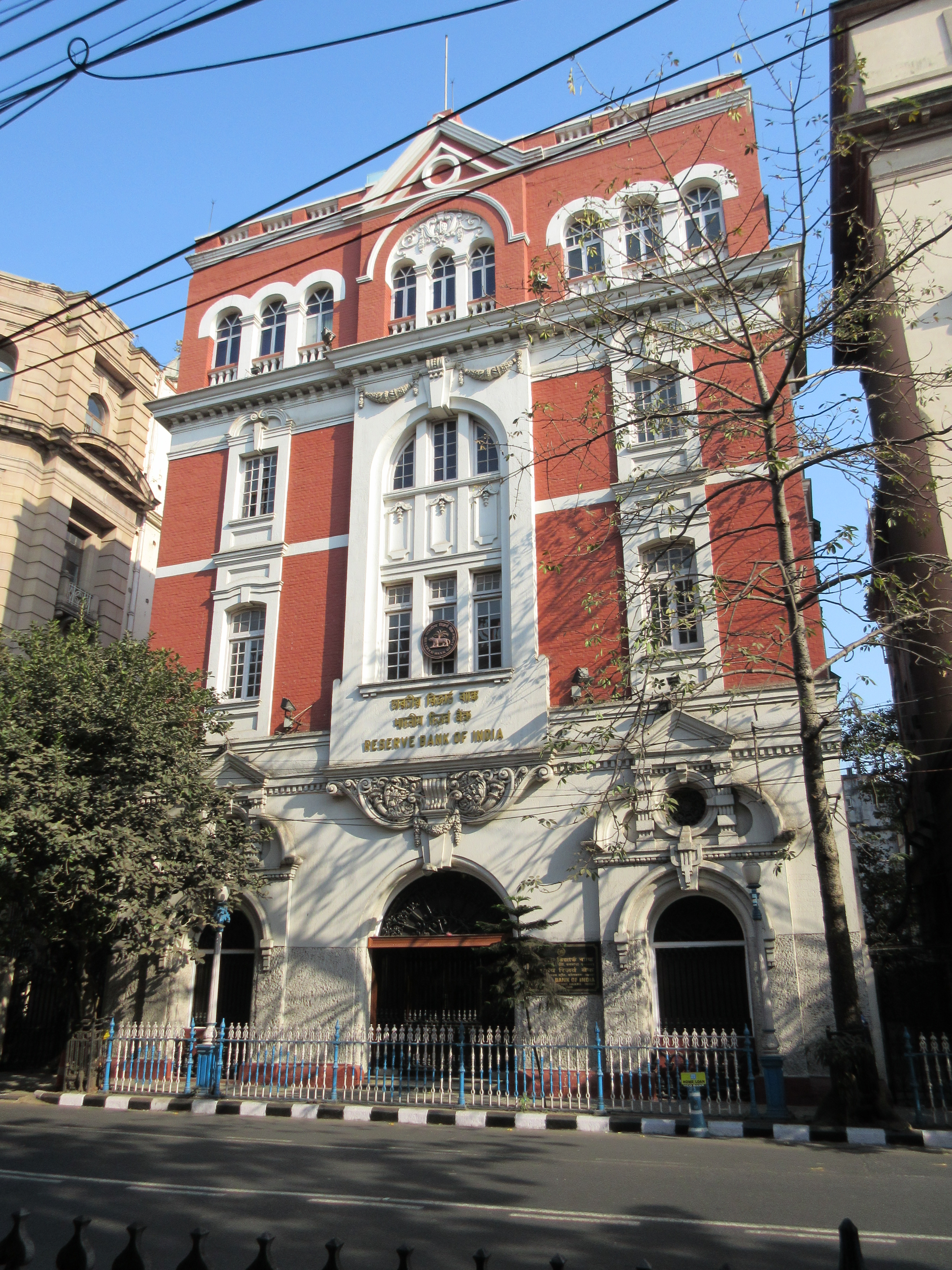
Alliance Bank, later the Reserve Bank of India, on Council House Street, Kolkata (Calcutta)

Alliance Bank opened its Calcutta branch on 15 October 1889 at 8, Council House Street in Central Kolkata's Dalhousie Square (now BBD Bagh). The firm Martin & Co., founded by Sir Rajendra Nath Mookerjee and Sir Thomas Acquin Martin, built the building, which still exists. After Alliance Bank failed, the Imperial Bank of India took over the building. After the Imperial Bank became the Reserve Bank of India in 1935, the Reserve Bank took over the premises.

Alliance was appointed the liquidator of Himalaya Bank (est. 1874), and opened a branch at Mussoorie on 21 August 1891. Next, it was the liquidator for Lloyd's Bank's branch at Darjeeling and opened a branch there on 1 January 1896.

Early In 1913, it acquired some of the assets and liabilities of The Bank of Upper India, which had been founded in Meerut in 1862 and had been the first joint-stock bank in India. This bank had opened a branch in Agra after the failure of Agra and Masterman's Bank. It had short-lived branches in Cawnpore and Fyzabad, and more successful ones in Simla (est. 1885), Lucknow, Allahabad, Bareilly, Naini Tal, Delhi and Mussoorie.

Then in 1916 Alliance Bank acquired the Indian business and six Indian branches of Delhi and London Bank (est. 1844). Boulton Brothers, of London, acquired the London business of Delhi and London Bank. Alliance and Boulton Brothers had been associated since 1914.

Alliance Bank also acquired in 1916 Punjab Banking Company, which Sir David P. Masson had founded in Lahore in 1889. The bank had branches in Abbottabad, Dalhousie, Ferozepore, Jullundar, Karachi, Cantonment [sic], Multan, Naushera (in the North-west Frontier province), Quetta, Peshawar, Sialkot, Simla, and Srinagar.

In 1917 Alliance Bank acquired the Bank of Rangoon (est. 1906), which had a branch in Madras in addition to its head office in Rangoon.

In 1922, Alliance Bank moved its headquarters to Calcutta, shortly before the bank's collapse and closure in 1923.

== Failure ==
Boulton Bros. engaged in fraudulent transactions that brought them down, and Alliance Bank as well. When Alliance Bank failed, the Imperial Bank took over its assets. For instance, Imperial Bank took over Alliance Bank's branch in Lahore and promised payment of 50% of the amount owed to creditors.

== See also ==
- List of banks that have merged to form the State Bank of India
