= YONO =

Indian digital banking platform powered by SBI

YONO SBI
- Developer: SBI
- Release: 24 November 2017; 8 years ago

Stable release(s)
- Android: 2.29.07 / 5 May 2026; 5 months ago
- iOS: 2.29.06 / 1 May 2026; 5 months ago
- Operating system: Android 12.0 & above; iOS 15.0 and above
- Platform: Android iOS
- Size: 167.2 MB (iOS); 95 MB (Android)
- Available in: English
- Type: Mobile banking Payment; UPI
- Website: sbi.bank.in

YONO SBI (You Only Need One State Bank of India) is an Indian India government-owned digital banking platform offered by State Bank of India (SBI) to enable users to access a variety of financial and other services such as flight, train, bus and taxi bookings, online shopping, or medical bill payments. YONO is offered as a mobile banking app for both Android and iOS. The launch of YONO had a code name project Lotus.

== Development and Launch ==
YONO SBI emerged from SBI's initial plan to make an "online marketplace" to attract millennials. The initiative was named "Project Lotus". It was nurtured for initial four years by Rajnish Kumar as an MD and then as the Chairman of bank. The app was launched in November 2017.

== Features ==
YONO SBI offers services from over 100 e-commerce companies including online shopping, travel planning, taxi booking, train booking, movie ticket booking, online education and offline retail with special discounts. YONO SBI also offers conventional mobile banking services such as bank account opening, fund transfers, cashless bill payments, and loans. The smartphone app can be used to make ATM withdrawals without using any ATM card through "Yono Cash" feature. As of October 2021, the app had emerged as the largest digital lender in India generating an average of Rs 1500-2000 crores loans per month. On 2 July 2023, a new version of Yono app was launched with the introduction of a new UPI feature which enabled other bank customers to use the app for UPI payments. The update also brought QR scanning and pay-by-contact UPI functionalities.

SBI rolled out YONO 2.0 on 15 December 2025—an enhanced digital banking platform that seamlessly combines YONO mobile and internet banking into one stylish system. With its streamlined interface and backend, users can effortlessly handle all their banking needs in a single location.

== YONO LITE SBI ==
YONO LITE SBI is a mobile banking application from the State Bank of India. Earlier, it was available as "SBI Anywhere Personal" but it was rebranded as "Yono Lite" in 2018, after the introduction of YONO app. In 2021, YONO LITE SBI saw several updates to protect its users from digital frauds.
