= Grit, Guts and Gumption =

2010 book by Rajesh Chakrabarti

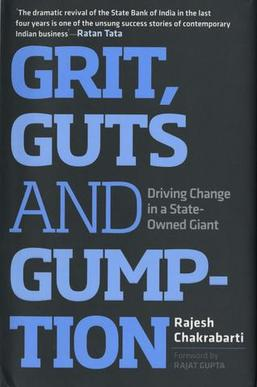
- Author: Rajesh Chakrabarti
- Language: English
- Subject: State Bank of India
- Genre: non-fiction
- Publisher: Viking Press
- Publication date: November 2010
- Publication place: India
- Media type: Print (hardcover)
- Pages: 256
- ISBN: 9780670085002
- OCLC: 694702163

Grit, Guts and Gumption: Driving Change in a State-Owned Giant is a book by Rajesh Chakrabarti, professor of Finance at Indian School of Business, Hyderabad. The book was published in November 2010 by Viking Press. The foreword of the book was written by Rajat Gupta, former managing director of McKinsey & Company and co-founder of Indian School of Business.

== Description ==
The book documents the story of transformation of State Bank of India from 2006 to 2010 under the chairmanship of O. P. Bhatt. The book outlines the changes that took place in the human resource, technology and processes of the company.

== See also ==
- Public sector banks in India
- Banking in India
