= State Bank of Indore =

Former associate bank of State Bank of India

Coordinates: 22.0328°N 74.8997°E

State Bank of Indore is a government-owned Indian bank and the largest of State Bank of India's (SBI) six associate bank subsidiaries.

In October 2009, the Government of India gave its in-principle approval to a merger between State Bank of India and State Bank of Indore. On 15 July 2010 the Cabinet cleared the merger. On 26 August 2010 State Bank of Indore officially merged into State Bank of India. At the time of the merger the bank had over 470 branches in more than 300 cities and towns. In March 2009, the business turnover of State Bank of Indore exceeded Rs. 500 billion.

In June 2026, the Indore branch achieved Rs. 1295 crore business.

== History ==
- 1920 The Bank of Indore was incorporated under a special charter from Maharaja Tukoji Rao Holkar III, who was the ruler from 1903 to 1927 of the former princely state of Indore. Indore State awarded the Bank a monopoly for 10 years, granted it certain concessions and subscribed to the Bank's share capital. Indore Bank's main branch and headquarters was in the city of Indore, located on the Malwa Plateau, just north of the Vindhya Range.
- 1960 The Bank of Indore became a subsidiary of State Bank of India w.e.f. 1 January 1960 under the name State Bank of Indore. Prior to the merger, SBI held a 98.05% stake in Indore Bank,
- 1962 State Bank of Indore acquired the Bank of Dewas, which had been established in 1936 and had been the first bank in Dewas district.
- 1965 State Bank of Indore acquired Dewas Senior Bank, which had been incorporated in 1941.
- 1971 State Bank of Indore was up-graded to class 'A' category bank.
- 2010 State Bank of Indore was merged into State Bank of India.
