= Carnatic Bank =

- Company type: Private sector
- Industry: Financial services
- Founded: 1 April 1788 (as The Bengal Bank)
- Founder: Josias Porcher
- Defunct: 31 March 1843
- Fate: Merged with the Bank of Madras
- Successor: Bank of Madras
- Headquarters: Chennai, India
- Area served: Madras Presidency in India
- Key people: Josias Porcher
- Products: Deposits, Personal Banking Schemes, C & I Banking Schemes, Agri Banking Schemes, SME Banking Schemes
- Services: Banking, Insurance, Capital Markets and allied industries
- Parent: State Bank of India

The Carnatic Bank was an Indian bank founded in the year 1788 in British India. The bank was the seventh oldest bank in India. The bank was eventually merged with the Bank of Madras in 1843.

== History ==
=== Founding ===
The Carnatic Bank was the very first bank founded in the Madras Presidency and served many cities in South India.

The founders of the bank were Josias Porcher and Thomas Redhead. Both were European merchants from Calcutta.

=== Management ===
The bank was staffed by mostly British nationals who were drawn mainly from the East India Company. The bank had most of its offices and branches in the Madras Presidency.

=== Final years ===
The bank was one of four banks that were merged to form the Bank of Madras in 1843: the Madras Bank, the Carnatic Bank, The British Bank of Madras (1795), and the Asiatic Bank (1804). The Bank of Madras is one of the precursors of the Imperial Bank of India and eventually the State Bank of India.

== Legacy ==
The bank is notable for being the seventh oldest bank in India.

The bank is also notable for being one of the precursors of the State Bank of India, through its predecessors the Imperial Bank of India and the Bank of Madras.

== See also ==
- Indian banking
- List of banks in India
