= The British Bank of Madras =

- Type: Private sector
- Industry: Financial services
- Founded: 1 April 1795
- Defunct: 1 July 1843
- Fate: Merged with the Bank of Madras
- Successor: Bank of Madras
- Headquarters: Chennai, India
- Number of locations: Madras Presidency
- Area served: India
- Products: Deposits, Personal Banking Schemes, C & I Banking Schemes, Agri Banking Schemes, SME Banking Schemes
- Services: Banking, Trade Finance
- Parent: State Bank of India

The British Bank of Madras was an Indian bank founded in the year 1795 in British India. The bank was the eighth oldest bank in India.

The bank was eventually merged with the Bank of Madras in 1843.

== History ==
=== Founding ===
The British Bank of Madras was the second oldest bank founded in the Madras Presidency after the Carnatic Bank and served many cities in South India.

The bank was founded and largely managed by European traders. They worked closely with the English East India Company.

=== Management ===
The bank was staffed by mostly British nationals who were drawn mainly from the East India Company.

The bank had most of its offices and branches in the Madras Presidency. The bank was headquartered in George Town in Chennai.

=== Final years ===
The bank was one of four banks that were merged to form the Bank of Madras in 1843: the Madras Bank, the Carnatic Bank, The British Bank of Madras (1795), and the Asiatic Bank (1804). The Bank of Madras is one of the precursors of the Imperial Bank of India and eventually the State Bank of India.

== Legacy ==
The bank is notable for being the eighth oldest bank in India.

The bank is also notable for being one of the precursors of the State Bank of India, through its predecessors the Imperial Bank of India and the Bank of Madras.

== See also ==
- Indian banking
- List of banks in India
