= State Bank of Patiala =

Former associate bank of State Bank of India

- Company type: Public
- Traded as: BSE: 501061; NSE: SBP
- Industry: Banking; Capital Markets and allied industries; Insurance
- Founded: Patiala, 1917
- Defunct: 2017
- Fate: Merged in State Bank of India in 2017
- Headquarters: Head Office, The Mall, Patiala 147 002 India
- Key people: Sh. Rajnish kumar (chairman); Shri. S. A. Ramesh Rangan (managing director)
- Products: Investment vehicles; Loans; Savings
- Revenue: ▲₹173,000 crore (US$18 billion) (2013)
- Net income: ▲₹11,358.06 crore (US$1.2 billion) (2013)
- Total assets: ▲₹116,709.10 crore (US$12 billion) (2013)
- Total equity: ▲₹203,417.50 crore (US$21 billion) (2013)
- Number of employees: 13178
- Parent: State Bank of India

State Bank of Patiala, founded in 1917, was an associate bank of the State Bank Group. It merged with State Bank of India on 1 April 2017. At the time of its merger, State Bank of Patiala had a network of 1445 service outlets, including 1314 branches, in all major cities of India, but most of the branches were located in the Indian states of Punjab, Haryana, Himachal Pradesh, Rajasthan, Jammu & Kashmir, Uttar Pradesh, Madhya Pradesh, Delhi, Gujarat and Maharashtra.

== History ==
His Highness Bhupinder Singh, Maharaja of Patiala State, founded the Patiala State Bank on 17 November 1917 to foster growth of agriculture, trade, and industry. The bank combined the functions of a commercial bank and those of a central bank for the princely state of Patiala. The bank had one branch at Chowk Fort, Patiala, Undivided India. By 1927, it had five branches. It primarily engaged in providing short-term credit to grain dealers and other traders.

The formation of the Patiala and East Punjab States Union in 1948 led to the bank being reorganized, being brought under the control of the Reserve Bank of India, and being renamed Bank of Patiala. In 1949, the Bank absorbed Bank of Faridkot and Jind Cooperative Bank, (Note: Jind Cooperative Bank was opened on 6 December 1922, at Bada Chowk, Sangrur.) though it subsequently gave up the cooperative business. The two acquired banks had been operating in neighboring princely states.

In 1950, Bank of Patiala started opening offices outside Patiala and East Punjab States Union. In 1952 it established a branch at Delhi. By 1959 the bank had 48 offices.

On 1 April 1960 Bank of Patiala became a subsidiary of State Bank of India and was renamed State Bank of Patiala. In April it absorbed Kalsia State Bank. (Note: Kalsia State Bank had only one branch and the managing director was also the State Accountant General.)

== Logo and slogan ==
The logo of the State Bank of Patiala is a blue circle with a small cut in the bottom that depicts perfection and the small man the common man – being the center of the bank's business. The logo came from National Institute of Design (NID), Ahmedabad, and it was inspired by Kankaria Lake, Ahmedabad.

== See also ==
- Banking in India
- List of banks in India

== Sources ==
- Ray, Abhik (2009). The evolution of the State Bank of India: The era from 1995 to 1980. Vol. 4. Penguin Books India.
- Walia, Ramesh (1972). Praja Mandal Movement in East Punjab States. Department of Punjab Historical Studies, Punjabi University.
