= State Bank of Bikaner & Jaipur =

Former associate bank of State Bank of India

STATE BANK OF BIKANER AND JAIPUR
- Type: Public
- Traded as: BSE: 501061; NSE: SBBJ
- Industry: Banking; Insurance; Capital Markets and allied industries
- Founded: Jaipur, 1963
- Defunct: 31 March 2017
- Fate: merged with State Bank of India on 31 March 2017
- Headquarters: Head Office, Tilak Marg, Jaipur 302 005 India
- Key people: Arundhati Bhattacharya(Chairman), Dibakar Mohanty(Managing Director)
- Products: Loans, Savings, Investment vehicles, etc.
- Revenue: ▲₹10,650 crore (US$1.1 billion) (March 2016)
- Net income: ▲₹850 crore (US$88 million) (March 2016)
- Total assets: ▲₹110,336 crore (US$11 billion) (March 2016)
- Number of employees: 12,831
- Parent: State Bank of India
- Website: sbi.co.in www.onlinesbi.com

State Bank of Bikaner & Jaipur (SBBJ) was a major Indian bank. It was a subsidiary of State Bank of India, with which it was merged on 31 March 2017. As of 2015, SBBJ had 1,360 branches, mostly located in the state of Rajasthan, India. Its branch network out of Rajasthan covered all the major business centers of India. In 1997, the bank entered the capital market with an initial public offering of 1,360,000 shares at a premium of Rs. 440 per share. For the year 2015-16 the net profit of the company was Rs. 8.5 billion.

== History ==
The genesis of State Bank of Bikaner & Jaipur dates back to the year 1943-44, when the Bank of Bikaner Ltd. and the Bank of Jaipur Ltd. came into existence. In 1960, both banks were incorporated as subsidiaries of State Bank of India and named as State Bank of Jaipur and State Bank of Bikaner. On 1 January 1963, both banks were merged into one entity viz. State Bank of Bikaner & Jaipur. The constitution, capital, management and other matters pertaining to the Bank are governed by the provisions of SBI (Subsidiary Banks) Act, 1959.

75% of the shares of SBBJ are held by SBI and the remaining by institutions and general public. The Bank took over the business of the Govind Bank Pvt. Ltd, Mathura on 25 April 1966. SBBJ went public in the year 1997 – 98 with an issue of 12.21 lakh shares of 100 each at a premium of 440/-. SBBJ is the only public sector bank with headquarter in Rajasthan.

At the time of incorporation, the Bank had a business of 45 crore, net profit of 7.5 lakh and a network of 124 branches (96 in Rajasthan). By March 2013 the business of the Bank increased to 1,30,590 crore, net profit stood at 730.24 crore.

The number of branches increased to 1049 (862 in Rajasthan) as on 30/09/2013. SBBJ had sponsored three Regional Rural Banks viz. Marwar Gramin Bank (set up in 1976), Sriganganagar Kshetriya Gramin Bank (1984) and Bikaner Kshetriya Gramin bank (1985). These were merged into single RRB viz. MGB Gramin Bank in June 2006, which covered the districts of Pali, Jalore and Sirohi. On 12 June 2006, SBBJ merged all three regional rural banks that it sponsored under the name MGB Gramin Bank, with headquarters in Jodhpur. On 25 February 2013, MGB Gramin Bank (RRB sponsored by SBBJ) and Jaipur Thar Gramin Bank (RRB sponsored by UCO Bank) merged into Marudhara Gramin Bank, sponsored by SBBJ, with headquarters in Jodhpur. The bank shoulders Lead Bank responsibility in 9 districts of the State.

The plans to make SBI one of the top 50 banks in the world affected SBBJ very much. In 2016, the plan to merge SBBJ with its five co-subsidiaries was made, and it was ratified by the Government of India on 15 February 2017. It finally merged with SBI on 31 March 2017.
