= State Bank of India =

Indian public sector bank

State Bank of India (SBI)

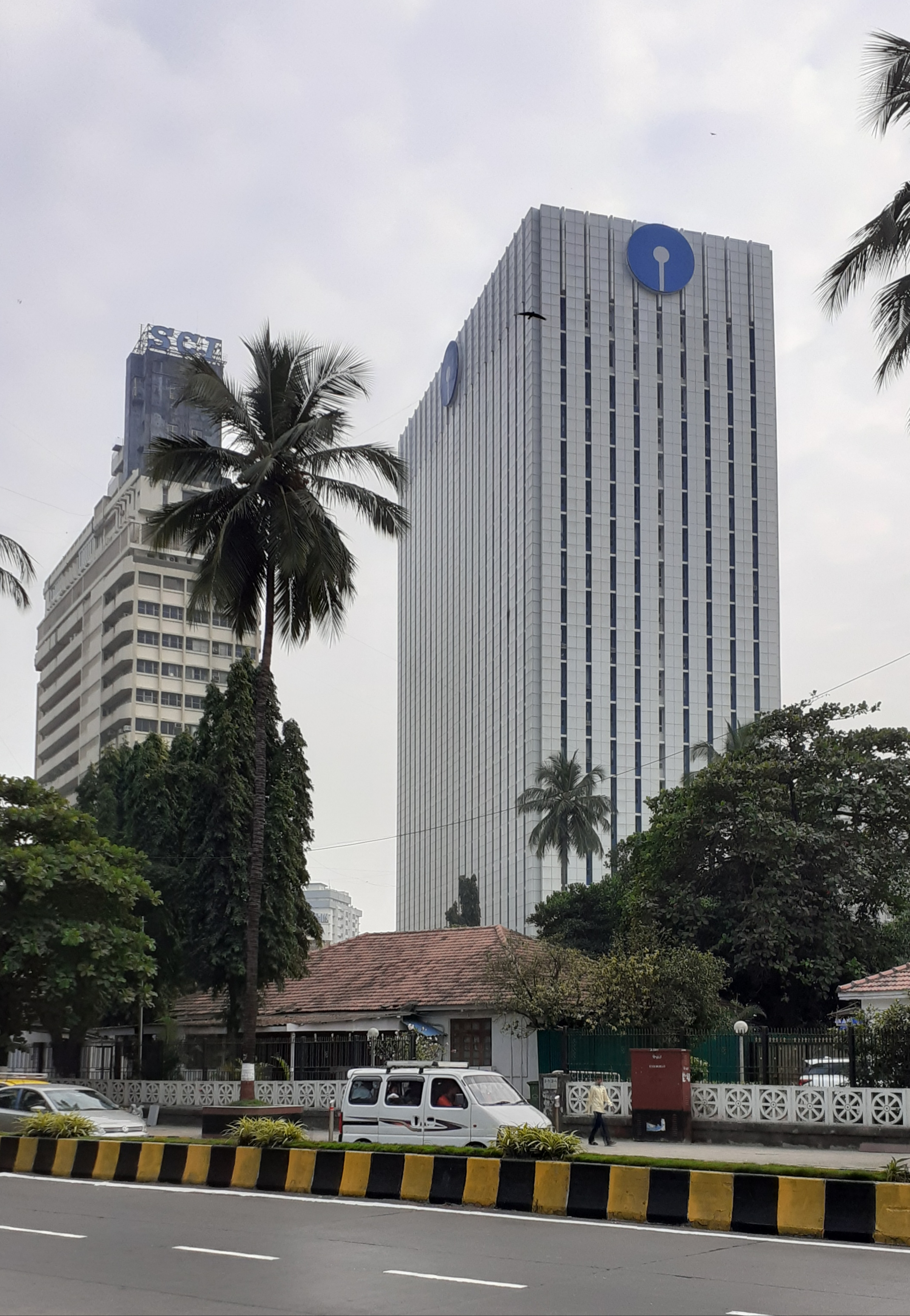
- State Bank Bhavan, Nariman Point, Mumbai
- Type: Public
- Traded as: NSE: SBIN; BSE: 500112; LSE: SBID; BSE SENSEX constituent; NSE NIFTY 50 constituent
- ISIN: INE062A01020
- Industry: Banking, financial services
- Predecessor: Imperial Bank of India (1921–1955) Bank of Calcutta (1806–1921) Bank of Bombay (1840–1921) Bank of Madras (1843–1921)
- Founded: 1 July 1955; 71 years ago
- Headquarters: State Bank Bhavan, M. C. Road, Nariman Point, Mumbai, India
- Number of locations: 23,270 branches 63,580 ATMs
- Area served: India
- Key people: Challa Sreenivasulu Setty (Chairman); Kameshwar Rao Kodavanti (CFO)
- Products: Retail banking; Corporate banking; Investment banking; Mortgage loans; Private banking; Wealth management; Asset management; Investment management; Credit cards; Insurance
- Revenue: ▲₹551,647 crore (US$57 billion) (2026)
- Operating income: ▲₹123,015 crore (US$13 billion) (2026)
- Net income: ▲₹80,032 crore (US$8.3 billion) (2026)
- Total assets: ▲₹7,623,012 crore (US$790 billion) (2026)
- Total equity: ▲₹544,442 crore (US$57 billion) (2026)
- Owner: Government of India (55.52%)
- Number of employees: 245,131 (2026)
- Subsidiaries: SBI Life Insurance; SBI Mutual Fund (63%); SBI Cards (68.63%); SBI General Insurance (69.11%)
- Capital ratio: Tier 1 15.4% (FY 2026)
- Rating: S&P BBB− / A-3/ Positive; Moody's Baa3/ P-3/ Stable; Fitch BBB− / F-3/ Stable
- Website: sbi.bank.in; retail.sbi.bank.in

The State Bank of India (SBI) is an Indian multinational public sector bank and financial services statutory body, headquartered in Mumbai. It is the largest bank in India by assets and deposits. It is also the thirteenth largest employer in India with nearly 260,000 employees. As of July 2026, the bank as a customer base of 53 crore customers.

The Reserve Bank of India (RBI) has identified SBI, HDFC Bank, and ICICI Bank as domestic systemically important banks (D-SIBs), which are often referred to as banks that are "too big to fail". SBI is the 43rd largest bank in the world by total assets and ranked 163rd in the Fortune Global 500 list of the world's biggest corporations of 2025.

The bank descends from the Bank of Calcutta, founded in 1806 via the Imperial Bank of India, making it the oldest commercial bank in the Indian subcontinent. The Bank of Madras merged into the other two presidency banks in British India, the Bank of Calcutta and the Bank of Bombay, to form the Imperial Bank of India, which in turn became the State Bank of India on 1 July 1955. Over the course of its 200-year history, the bank has been formed from the mergers and acquisitions of more than twenty banks. The Union of India took control of the Imperial Bank of India in 1955, with Reserve Bank of India (India's central bank) taking a 60% stake, renaming it State Bank of India.

== History ==
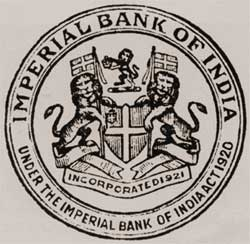
Seal of Imperial Bank of India

The roots of the State Bank of India lie in the first decade of the 19th century when the Bank of Calcutta (later renamed the Bank of Bengal) was established on 2 June 1806. The Bank of Bengal was one of three Presidency banks, the other two being the Bank of Bombay (est. 15 April 1840) and the Bank of Madras (est. 01-July-1843). All three Presidency banks were incorporated as joint stock companies and were the result of royal charters. These three banks received the exclusive right to issue paper currency till 1861 when, with the Paper Currency Act, the right was taken over by the Union of India. The Presidency banks amalgamated on 27 January 1921, and the re-organised banking entity took as its name Imperial Bank of India. The Imperial Bank of India remained a joint-stock company but without state participation.

Under the provisions of the State Bank of India Act, 1955, the Reserve Bank of India, which is India's central bank, acquired a controlling interest in the Imperial Bank of India. On 1 July 1955, the Imperial Bank of India became the State Bank of India. In 2008, the Union of India acquired the Reserve Bank of India's stake in SBI to remove any conflict of interest because the RBI is the country's banking regulatory authority.

In 1959, the government passed the State Bank of India (Subsidiary Banks) Act. This made eight banks that had belonged to princely states into subsidiaries of SBI. This was during the First Five-Year Plan, which prioritised the development of rural India. The government integrated these banks into the State Bank of India system to expand its rural outreach. In 1963, SBI merged the State Bank of Jaipur (est. 1943) and State Bank of Bikaner (est. 1944).

SBI has acquired local banks in rescues. The first was the Bank of Bihar (est. 1911), which SBI acquired in 1969, together with its 28 branches. The next year, SBI acquired the National Bank of Lahore (est. 1942), which had 24 branches. Five years later, in 1975, SBI acquired Krishnaram Baldeo Bank, which had been established in 1916 in Gwalior State, under the patronage of King Madho Rao Scindia. The bank had been the Dukan Pichadi, a small moneylender, owned by the Maharaja. In 1985, SBI acquired the Bank of Cochin in Kerala, which had 120 branches. SBI was the acquirer as its affiliate, the State Bank of Travancore, already had an extensive network in Kerala.

In March 2001, SBI partnered with BNP Paribas to form a 76:24 joint venture life insurance company named SBI Life Insurance Company.

The proposal to merge all the associate banks into SBI to create a single very large bank and streamline operations started in the mid-2000s.

The first step towards unification occurred on 13 August 2008 when State Bank of Saurashtra merged with SBI, reducing the number of associate state banks from seven to six. On 19 June 2009, the SBI board approved the absorption of State Bank of Indore, in which SBI held 98.3%. The acquisition of State Bank of Indore added 470 branches to SBI's existing network of branches. The process of merging of State Bank of Indore was completed in 2010.

In 2009, SBI and Macquarie Group established the Macquarie-SBI Infrastructure Fund to invest in infrastructure projects in India. In 2011, SBI and Oman's sovereign wealth fund SGRF launched a 50:50 joint venture private equity firm called the Oman India Joint Investment Fund.

On 7 October 2013, Arundhati Bhattacharya became the first woman to be appointed chairperson of the bank.

Under the Pradhan Mantri Jan Dhan Yojana of financial inclusion launched by Government in August 2014, SBI held 11,300 camps and opened over 30 lakh (3 million) accounts by September, which included 21 lakh (2.1 million) accounts in rural areas and 15.7 lakh (1.57 million) accounts in urban areas.

In 2016, the board of SBI and the Union Cabinet cleared the proposal to merge the remaining five associate banks (State Bank of Bikaner and Jaipur, State Bank of Hyderabad, State Bank of Mysore, State Bank of Patiala, and State Bank of Travancore) and SBI's fully owned subsidiary Bharatiya Mahila Bank with SBI. The merger would see SBI entering the list of world's 50 largest banks by assets. The merger went into effect on 1 April 2017.

In March 2020, as part of an RBI-directed rescue deal, the State Bank of India acquired a 48.2% stake in Yes Bank. As of 8 February 2024, the shareholding had decreased to 26.13%.

On 16 August 2022, in an attempt to facilitate and support India's start-ups, SBI launched a dedicated branch for start-ups in Bengaluru.

== Operations ==
SBI has 17 regional hubs known as local head offices (LHOs), under whom are 57 administrative offices (AOs), that are located in important cities throughout India, under whom are furthermore administrative sub-offices known as regional business offices (RBOs), with each RBO having, under its direct administrative control, some 40 to 50 branches.

=== Domestic ===
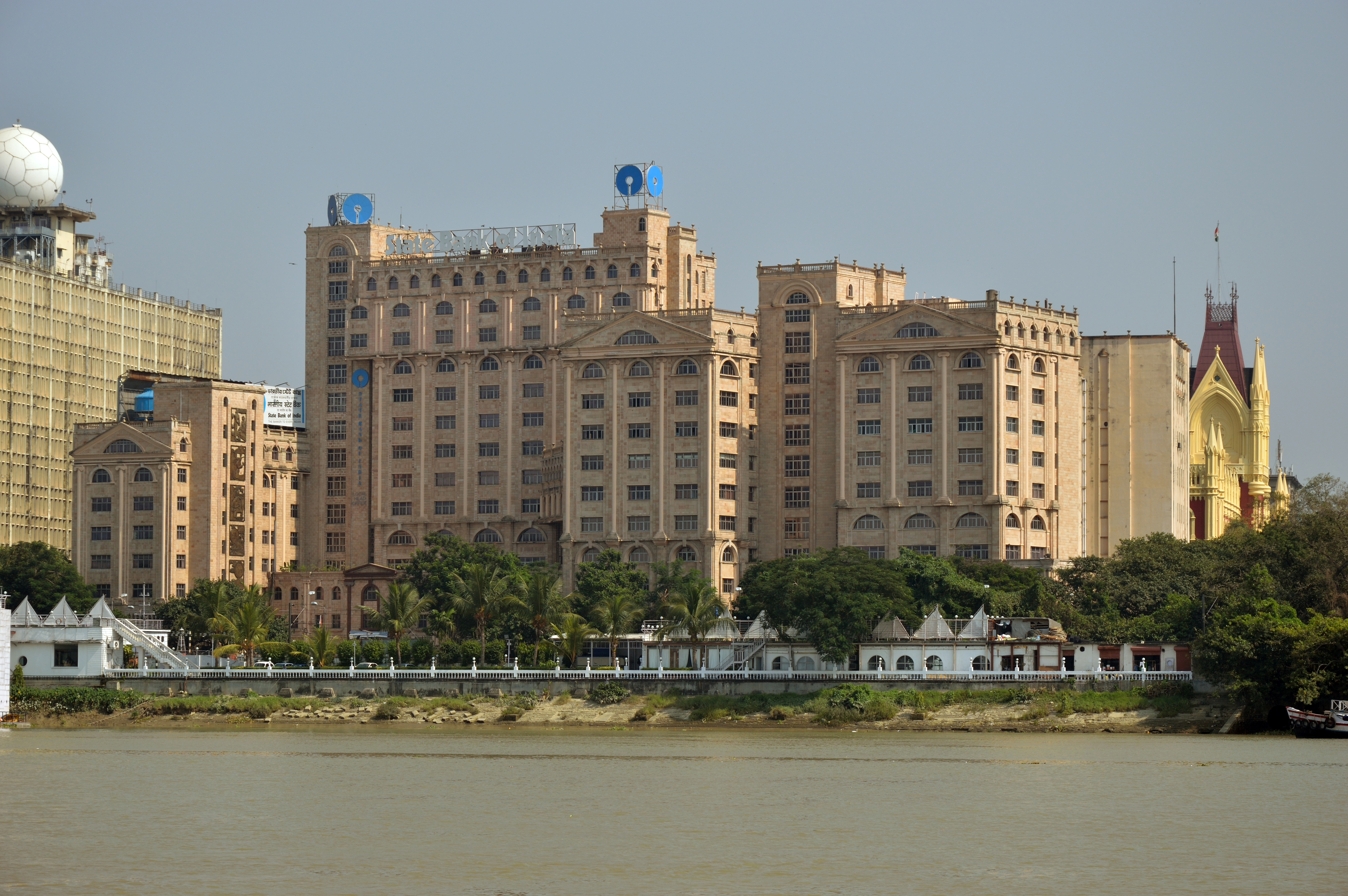
Samriddhi Bhavan, Kolkata

As per SBI website, SBI has over 22,500 branches in India. In the financial year 2012–13, 95.35% of its revenue and 88.37% of total profits came from domestic operations.

As of 2026, the SBI group had 63,580 ATMs/ADWMs. and 82,900 BC outlets. In November 2017, SBI launched an integrated digital banking platform named YONO. SBI YONO has 87.7 million users in FY25.

=== International ===
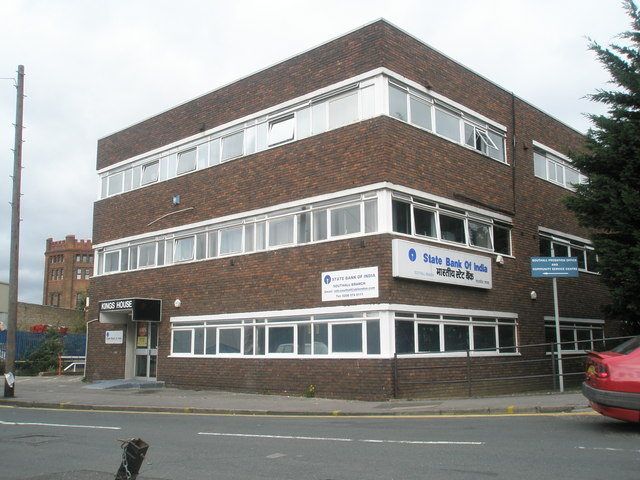
State Bank of India branch at Southall, United Kingdom

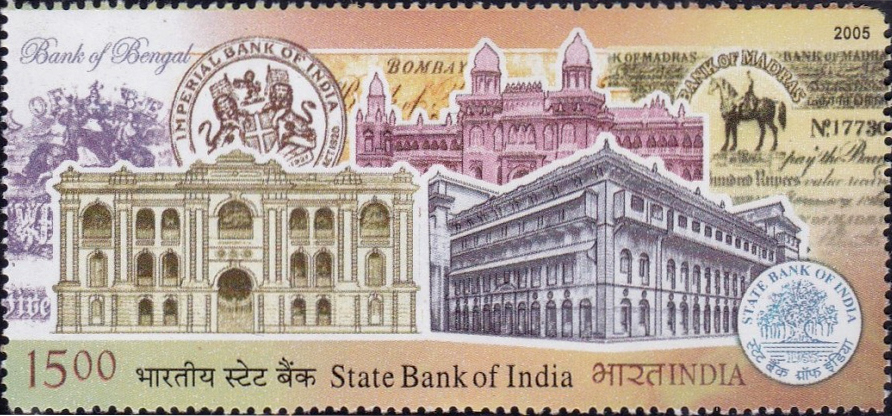
Stamp dedicated to the State Bank of India in 2005

As per its 2025-2026 annual report, SBI has about 245 overseas offices across 29 countries, with the first one being established in Colombo (Sri Lanka) in 1864.

- SBI Australia: SBI Australia expands its presence to two locations, Melbourne and Sydney
- SBI Bangladesh: SBI Bangladesh is located across 20 branches, including the capital city, Dhaka.
- SBI Bahrain: SBI Bahrain is spread across two branches/offices in Bahrain.
- SBI Canada Bank was incorporated in 1982 as a subsidiary of the State Bank of India. SBI Canada Bank is a Schedule II Canadian Bank listed under the Bank Act and is a member of the Canada Deposit Insurance Corporation.
- SBI China: SBI China has made its presence in Shanghai.
- PT Bank SBI Indonesia: SBI acquired a 76% stake in PT Bank Indo Monex for $6 million in 2006. In 2009, the bank was renamed PT Bank SBI Indonesia.
- SBI (Mauritius) Ltd: SBI established an offshore bank in 1989, State Bank of India International (Mauritius) Ltd. This then amalgamated with The Indian Ocean International Bank (which had been doing retail banking in Mauritius since 1979) to form SBI (Mauritius) Ltd. Today, SBI (Mauritius) Ltd has 14 branches – 13 retail branches and 1 global business branch at Ebene in Mauritius.
- Nepal SBI Bank Limited: SBI owns 55% stake, while the state-owned Employees Provident Fund of Nepal owns 15% and the general public owns the remaining 30%. Nepal SBI Bank Limited has branches throughout the country.
- Commercial Indo Bank LLC, Moscow was established as a 60:40 joint venture between SBI and Canara Bank. In 2022, SBI acquired Canara Bank's 40% stake for $14.67 million.
- SBI Singapore: In 1977, SBI established an offshore bank in Singapore providing commercial and wholesale banking services. In October 2008, it obtained a qualified full banking license.
- SBI South Korea: In January 2016, SBI opened its first branch in Seoul, South Korea.
- SBI South Africa: SBI South Africa is located in two main locations, that of Johannesburg and Durban.
- SBI Sri Lanka: was founded in 1864 and is the oldest bank in Sri Lanka. It has three branches located in Colombo, Kandy and Jaffna.
- SBI UK Ltd: SBI UK Ltd is located across 11 locations, including major locations like London, Birmingham, Manchester among other branches, all providing retail, business, and NRI services.
- SBI US: In 1982, the bank established a subsidiary, State Bank of India (California). It has ten branches — nine branches in the state of California and one in Washington, D.C., as of 28 March 2011.

=== Former associate banks ===
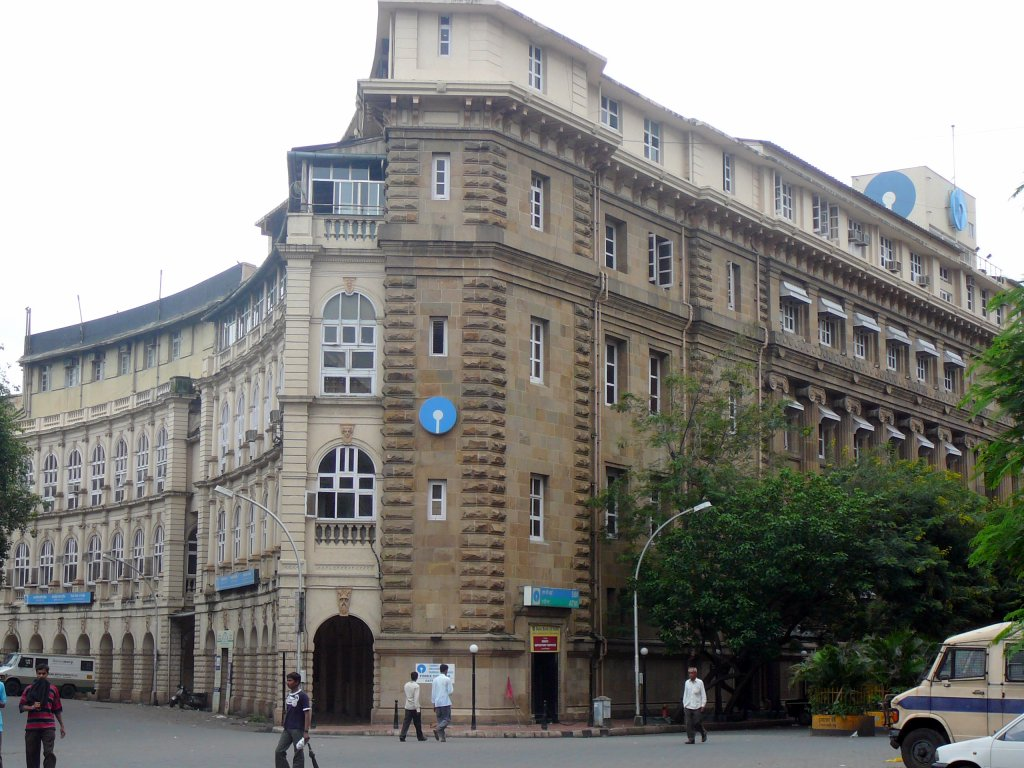
Main branch of SBI in Mumbai

SBI acquired the control of seven banks in 1960. They were the seven regional banks of former Indian princely states. They were renamed, prefixing them with 'State Bank of'. These seven banks were State Bank of Bikaner and Jaipur (SBBJ), State Bank of Hyderabad (SBH), State Bank of Indore (SBN), State Bank of Mysore (SBM), State Bank of Patiala (SBP), State Bank of Saurashtra (SBS) and State Bank of Travancore (SBT). All these banks were given the same logo as the parent bank, SBI.

The plans for making SBI a single very large bank by merging all associate banks started in 2008, when SBS merged with SBI. The very next year, SBN also merged with SBI. The merger of the five remaining associate banks, namely SBBJ, SBH, SBM, SBP, and SBT, with the SBI received approval in 2016. The merger completed in April 2017, with SBI's fully owned subsidiary Bharatiya Mahila Bank also merging with SBI.

In Nigeria, SBI operated as INMB Bank, which began in 1981 as the Indo–Nigerian Merchant Bank and received permission in 2002 to commence retail banking. It later merged with NAL Bank. In Kenya, State Bank of India acquired 76% of Giro Commercial Bank for US$8 million in October 2005. In 2015, Giro Commercial Bank was acquired by I&M Holdings. In Botswana, SBI registered a subsidiary on 27 January 2006 and was issued a banking licence by the Bank of Botswana on 29 July 2013. The subsidiary handed over its banking licence and closed its operations in 2021.

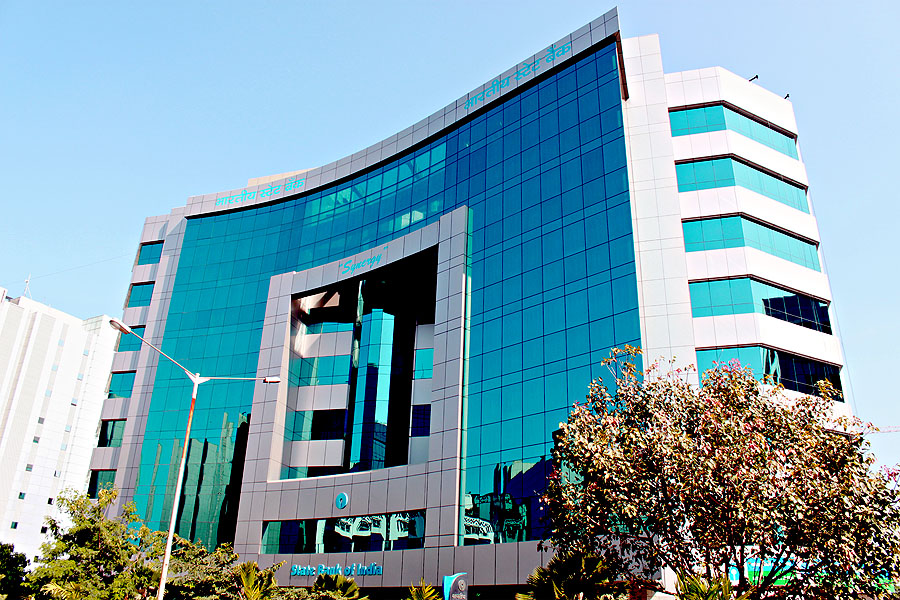
State Bank of India Mumbai LHO

=== Non-banking subsidiaries ===
Notable non-banking subsidiaries of SBI include:

- SBI Capital Markets Ltd.
- SBICap Trustee Company Ltd., a wholly owned subsidiary of SBI Capital Markets
- SBICap Securities Ltd.
- SBI Cards & Payments Services Ltd. (68.60% stake and FY 2024-25 net profit at Rs.1916 Crore)
- SBI Life Insurance Company Ltd.
- SBI General Insurance Company Ltd.
- SBI Funds Management Ltd.
- SBI Factors Ltd.
- SBI DFHI Ltd. (72.17% stake and FY 2024-25 net profit at Rs.330.86 Crore)
- State Bank Operations Support Services Pvt. Ltd.
- SBI-SG Global Securities Services Pvt. Ltd.
- SBI Ventures Ltd.
- SBI Mutual Fund Trustee Company Pvt. Limited.
- SBI Funds Management Limited
- SBI Pension Funds Private Limited
- SBI Payment Services Private Limited
- SBI CDMDF Trustee Pvt. Ltd.
- C - Edge Technologies Limited
- SBI Macquarie Infrastructure Management Private Limited
- SBI Macquarie Infrastructure Trustee Pvt Ltd.
- Macquarie SBI Infrastructure Management Pvt. Ltd.
- Macquarie SBI Infrastructure Trustee Ltd.

=== Affiliate banks ===
Banks in which SBI owns non-controlling minority stakes (in ascending order) include:

- Yes Bank (10.8%)
- Bank of Bhutan (20%)

=== Regional rural banks ===
- Arunachal Pradesh Rural Bank (35%)
- Chhattisgarh Gramin Bank (35%)
- Jharkhand Gramin Bank (35%)
- Meghalaya Rural Bank (35%)
- Mizoram Rural Bank (35%)
- Nagaland Rural Bank (35%)
- Rajasthan Gramin Bank (35%)
- Telangana Grameena Bank (35%)
- Uttarakhand Gramin Bank (35%)

== Listings and shareholding ==
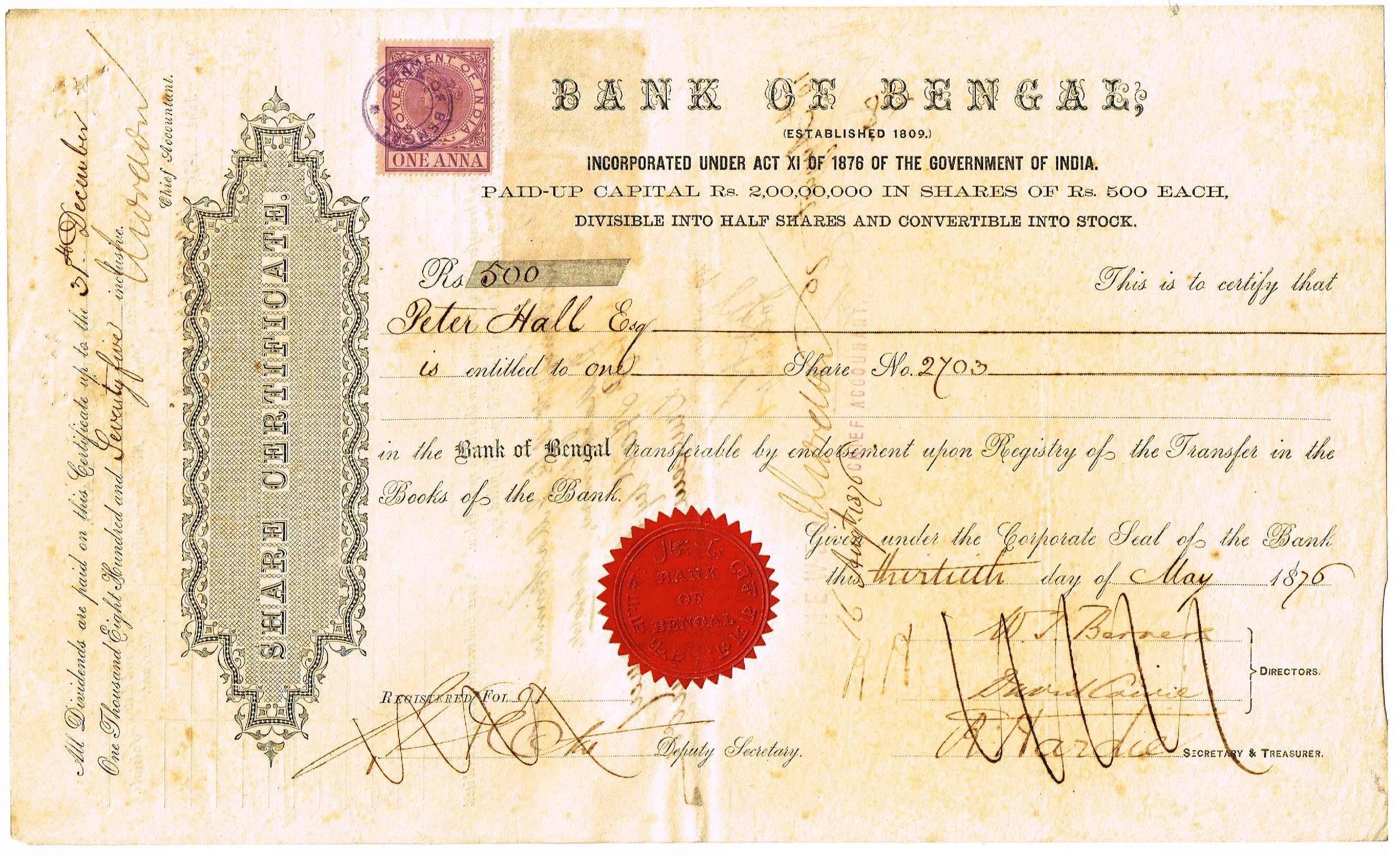
Share of the Bank of Bengal, issued 13 May 1876

As of 30 September 2025, the Union of India held a 55.50% equity shares in SBI. The equity shares of SBI are listed on the Bombay Stock Exchange, where it is a constituent of the BSE SENSEX index, and the National Stock Exchange of India, where it is a constituent of the NIFTY 50. Its Global Depository Receipts (GDRs) are listed on the London Stock Exchange.

== Employees ==
SBI is one of the largest employers in India with 232,296 employees as of 31 March 2024. The percentage of officers, associates, and subordinate staff was 47%, 38%, and 13% respectively on the same date. Each employee contributed a net profit of ₹2,620,460 (US$27,000) during FY 2023–24. As of March 2026, the percentage of women employees in State Bank of India was 28.5%. 6,129 persons with disabilities were also provided employment with SBI. The current chairperson of SBI is Challa Sreenivasulu Setty.

== Logo ==
The State Bank of India logo was designed by NID in 1971.

The SBI logo was designed by the National Institute of Design, Ahmedabad in 1971. The logo was designed by Shekhar Kamat and the logotype in 14 Indian languages was designed by Mahendra Patel. State Bank of India and all its associate banks used the same blue keyhole logo. The State Bank of India wordmark usually had one standard typeface, but also utilised other typefaces. The wordmark now has the keyhole logo followed by "SBI".

== Philanthropy ==
State Bank of India maintains a philanthropic arm named SBI Foundation which supports development initiatives in India and also with initiatives that comply under the Ministry of Corporate Affairs under corporate social responsibility.

== Awards ==
- State Bank of India (SBI) won the ET Company of the Year award at The Economic Times Awards for Corporate Excellence 2023. The award was accepted by SBI Chairman Dinesh Kumar Khara.
- The State Bank of India (SBI) was named the World's Best Consumer Bank for 2025 by Global Finance (magazine).
- SBI was awarded the 'World's Best Consumer Bank 2025 Award' and 'Best Bank in India 2025' by Global Finance, New York.

== See also ==
- List of banks in India
- List of largest banks
- List of companies of India
- Forbes Global 2000
- Fortune India 500
- Grit, Guts and Gumption
