= Colonial India =

Period of Indian history characterised by European colonial rule

Colonial India was the part of the Indian subcontinent that was occupied by European colonial powers during and after the Age of Discovery. European power was exerted both by conquest and trade, especially in spices. Near the end of the 15th century, Portuguese sailor Vasco da Gama became the first European to re-establish direct trade links with India by being the first to arrive by circumnavigating Africa (c. 1497–1499). Arriving in Calicut – by then one of the major trading ports of the eastern world – he obtained permission to trade in the city from the Saamoothiris (Zamorins). The next to arrive were the Dutch, with their main base in Ceylon, but their expansion into India was halted after their defeat in the Battle of Colachel to the Kingdom of Travancore, during the Travancore–Dutch War on the hands of Marthanda Varma.

Trading rivalries among the seafaring European powers brought other coastal powers from the empires of Europe to India. The Dutch Republic, England, France, and Denmark–Norway all established trading posts in India in the early 17th century. As the Mughal Empire disintegrated in the early 18th century, and then as the Maratha Empire became weakened after the third battle of Panipat, many relatively weak and unstable Indian states which emerged were increasingly open to manipulation by the Europeans, through dependent Indian rulers.

In the later 18th century, Great Britain and France struggled for dominance, partly through proxy Indian rulers but also by direct military intervention. The defeat of the formidable Indian ruler Tipu Sultan in 1799 marginalised the French influence. This was followed by a rapid expansion of British power through the greater part of the Indian subcontinent in the early 19th century. By the middle of the century, the British had already gained direct or indirect control over almost all parts of India. British India, consisting of the directly ruled British presidencies and provinces, contained the most populous and valuable parts of the British Empire and thus became known as "the jewel in the British crown".

During its colonial era, India was a founding member of the League of Nations, a participating nation in the Summer Olympics (1900, 1920, 1928, 1932, and 1936), and a founding member of the United Nations in San Francisco in 1945. In 1947, India gained its independence and was partitioned into the Dominion of India and the Dominion of Pakistan, the latter of which was created as a homeland for colonial India's Muslims.

== Portuguese ==
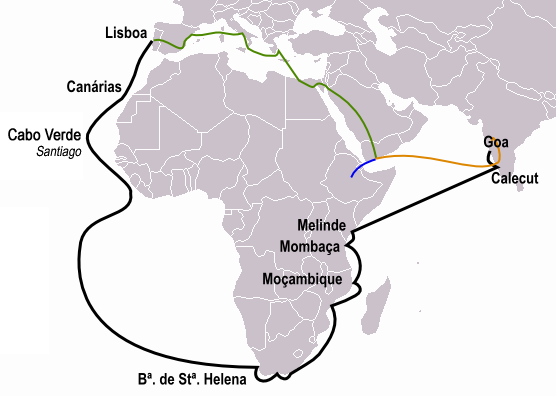
The path Vasco da Gama took to reach Calicut (black line) in 1498, which was also the discovery of a sea route from Europe to India, and eventually paved way for the European colonisation of Indian subcontinent.

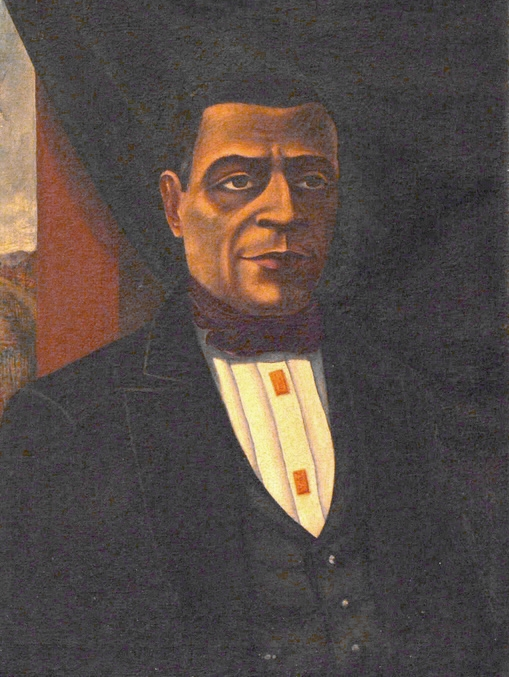
Bernardo Peres da Silva, the only ethnic Indian governor general in colonial India

The first successful voyage to India by sea was by Vasco da Gama in 1498, when after sailing around the Cape of Good Hope he arrived in Calicut, now in Kerala. Having arrived there, he obtained permission from Saamoothiri Rajah to trade in the city. The navigator was received with traditional hospitality, but an interview with the Saamoothiri (Zamorin) failed to produce any definitive results. Vasco da Gama requested permission to leave a factor behind in charge of the merchandise he could not sell; his request was refused, and the king insisted that Gama should pay customs duty like any other trader, which strained their relations. The ruler of the Kingdom of Tanur, who was a vassal to the Zamorin of Calicut, sided with the Portuguese, against his overlord at Calicut. As a result, the Kingdom of Tanur (Vettathunadu) became one of the earliest Portuguese allies in India. The ruler of Tanur also sided with Cochin. Many of the members of the royal family of Cochin in 16th and 17th members were selected from Vettom. However, the Tanur forces under the king fought for the Zamorin of Calicut in the Battle of Cochin (1504). However, the allegiance of the Mappila merchants in Tanur region still stayed under the Zamorin of Calicut.

Francisco de Almeida was appointed Viceroy of India in 1505. During his tenure, the Portuguese dominated Kochi and established a few fortresses on the Malabar Coast. The Portuguese suffered setbacks from attacks by Zamorin forces in South Malabar; especially from naval attacks under the leadership of Calicut admirals known as Kunjali Marakkars, which compelled them to seek a treaty. The Kunjali Marakkars were credited with organising the first naval defence of the Indian coast. Tuhfat Ul Mujahideen, written by Zainuddin Makhdoom II (born around 1532) of Ponnani in the 16th century CE, is the first-ever known book fully based on the history of Kerala, written by a Keralite. It is written in Arabic and contains pieces of information about the resistance put up by the navy of Kunjali Marakkar alongside the Zamorin of Calicut from 1498 to 1583 against Portuguese attempts to colonise the Malabar coast. In 1571, the Portuguese were defeated by the Zamorin forces in the battle at Chaliyam Fort.

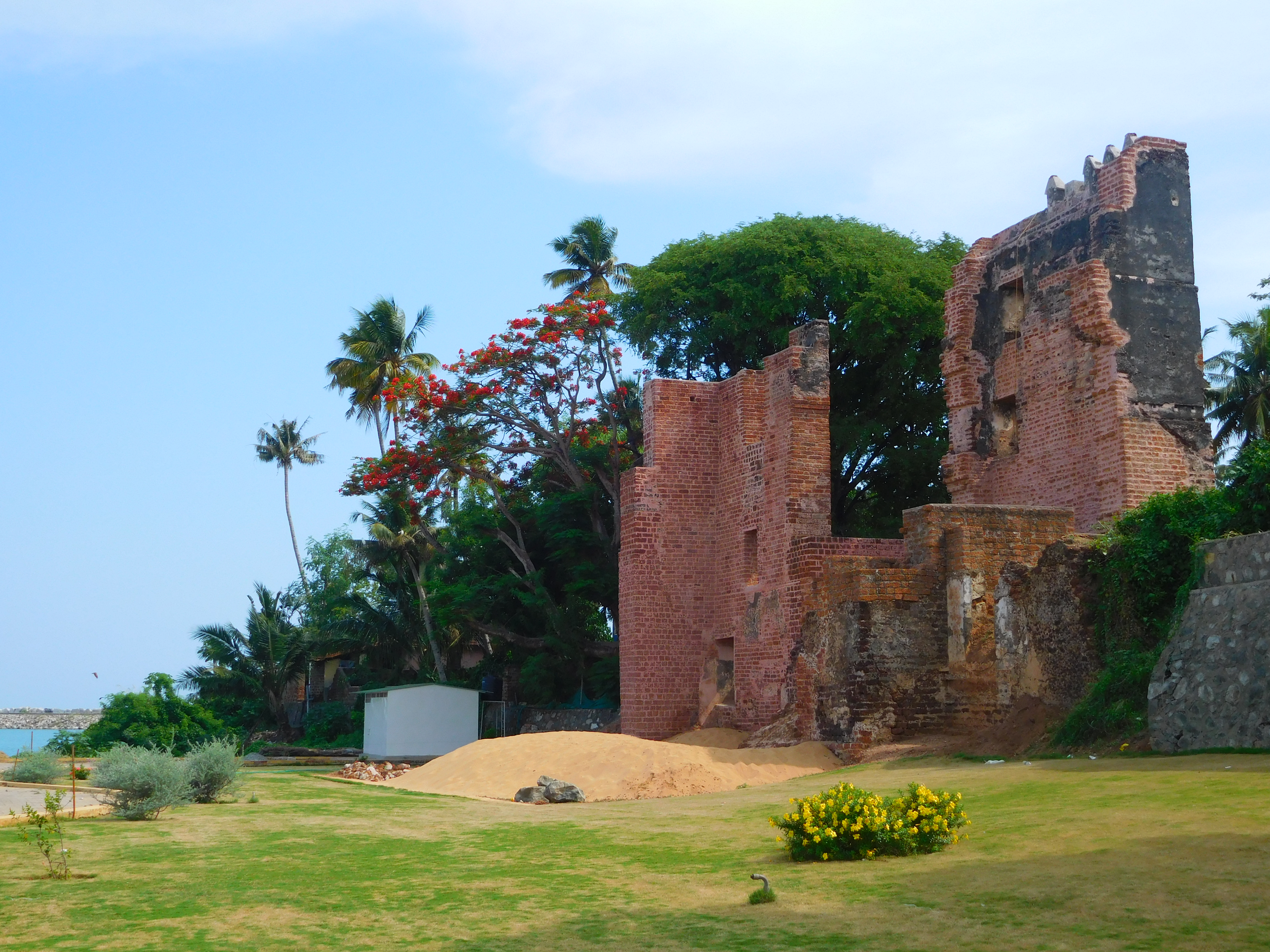
Ruins of the Portuguese-built St Thomas Fort at Tangasseri in Kollam city, established in 1518

Although Portugal's presence in India initially started in 1498, their colonial rule lasted from 1505 until 1961. The Portuguese Empire established the first European trading centre at Quilon (Kollam) in 1502. It is believed that the colonial era in India started with the establishment of this Portuguese trading centre at Quilon. In 1505, King Manuel I of Portugal appointed Dom Francisco de Almeida as the first Portuguese viceroy in India, followed in 1509 by Dom Afonso de Albuquerque. In 1510, Albuquerque conquered the city of Goa, which had been controlled by Muslims. He inaugurated the policy of marrying Portuguese men with native women who had converted to Catholicism, the consequence of which was a great miscegenation in Goa and other Portuguese territories in Asia. The first revolt against the Portuguese was the Conspiracy of the Pintos in 1787.

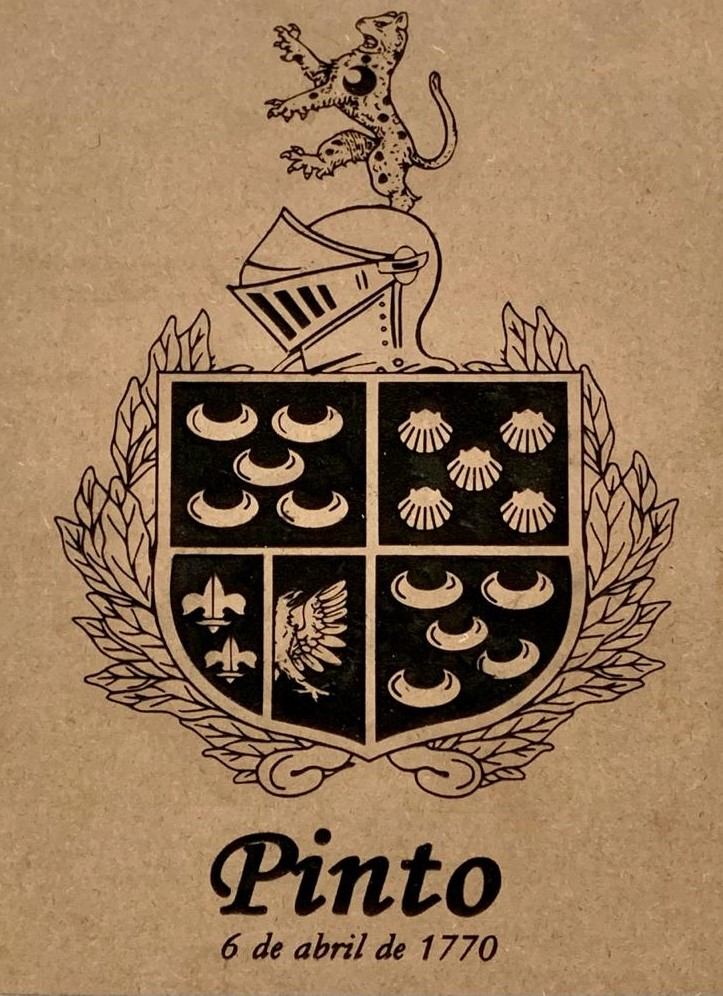
Coat of arms of the Pintos, the ethnic Goan family that led the first anti-colonial revolt in India

For decades after, the Conspiracy was used as a stick to defame and denigrate Goan missionaries and priests in British India by their opponents, the Vicars Apostolic of the Propaganda party, Goans being of the Padroado party. The incident was used to represent the Goans to the British government and to the Christians in British India as untrustworthy, rebellious and willing to compromise with their own enemies (Tipu Sultan). This became Goa's black legend.

Abbé Faria teamed up with the revolutionaries of the French Revolution and participated along with the "juring" clerics in the Revolutionaries' brutal persecution of the Catholic Church in France and elsewhere. Two Pinto brothers, Lt. Col Francisco and Jose Antonio, joined the army of the Maratha Empire under Baji Rao II and fought against the British in the Second Anglo-Maratha War and Third Anglo-Maratha War.

While the revolt failed, Goans did achieve stronger forms of government; and when the Portuguese Constitution of 1822 was adopted, two native Goans, Bernardo Peres da Silva and Constâncio Roque da Costa, were elected to the first parliament in Portugal, a practice that continued until the Indian annexation of Goa in 1961

An account of this was recorded by the Portuguese civil servant Joaquim Heliodoro da Cunha Rivara and is one of the major accounts of the Pinto revolt and has been subsequently translated into English by Dr. Charles Borges. Goa was annexed by India on 19 December 1961. Another feature of the Portuguese presence in India was their promotion of Catholicism by sponsoring missionaries from various religious orders, such as the Jesuit missionary Saint Francis Xavier, who is revered among the Catholics of India.

== Dutch ==
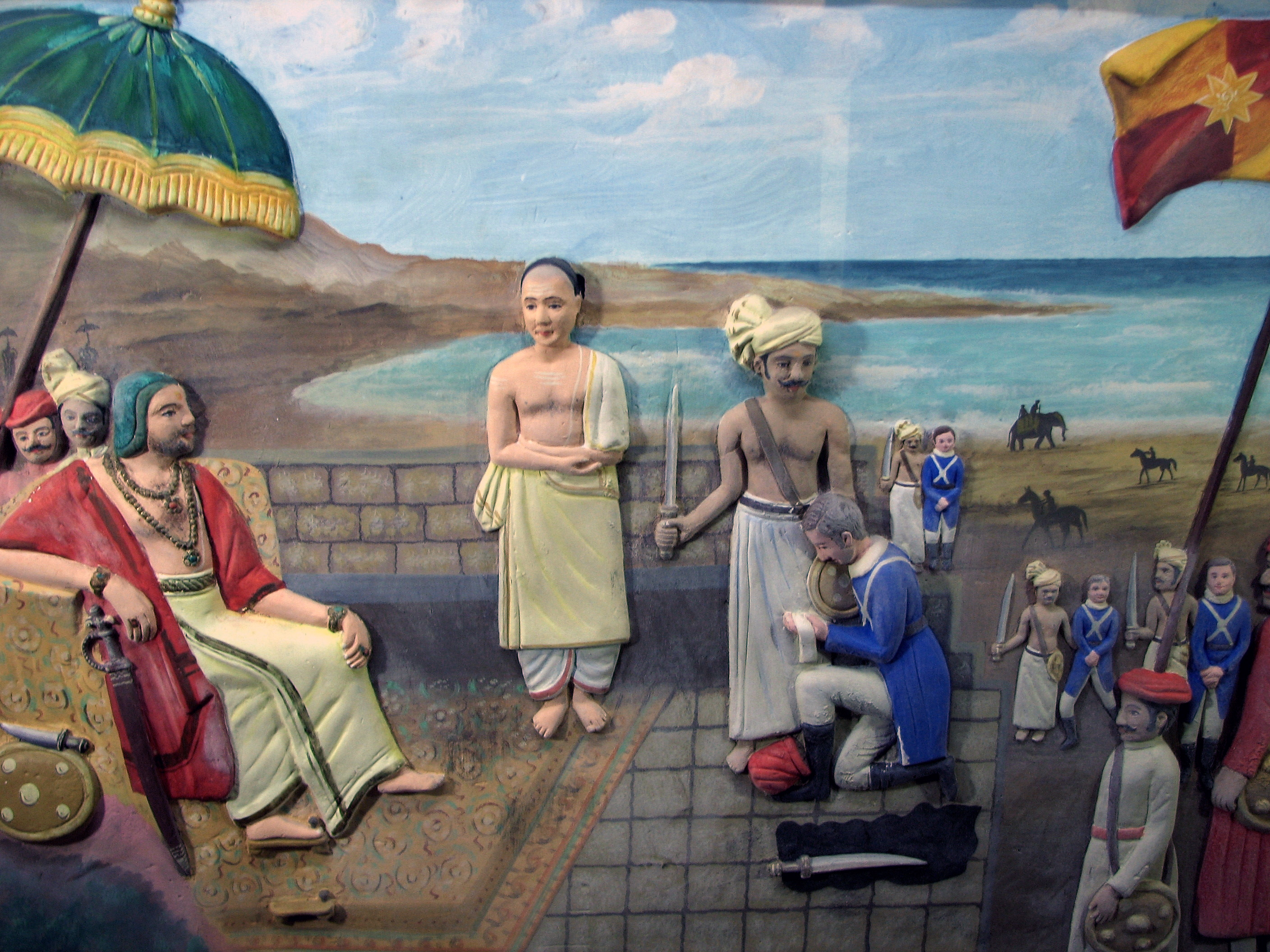
Eustachius De Lannoy of the Dutch East India Company surrenders to Maharaja Marthanda Varma of the Kingdom of Travancore after the Battle of Colachel (Depiction at Padmanabhapuram Palace).

The Dutch East India Company established trading posts along different parts of the Indian coast. For some time, they controlled the Malabar southwest coast (Pallipuram, Cochin, Cochin de Baixo/Santa Cruz, Quilon (Coylan), Cannanore, Kundapura, Kayamkulam, Ponnani) and the Coromandel southeastern coast (Golkonda, Bhimunipatnam, Pulicat, Parangipettai, Negapatnam) and Surat (1616–1795). They conquered Ceylon from the Portuguese. The Dutch also established trading stations in Travancore and coastal Tamil Nadu as well as at Rajshahi in present-day Bangladesh, Hugli-Chinsura, and Murshidabad in present-day West Bengal, Balasore (Baleshwar or Bellasoor) in Odisha, and Ava, Arakan, and Syriam in present-day Myanmar (Burma). However, their expansion into India was halted, after their defeat in the Battle of Colachel to the Kingdom of Travancore, during the Travancore-Dutch War. The Dutch never recovered from the defeat and no longer posed a large colonial threat to India.

Ceylon was lost at the Congress of Vienna in the aftermath of the Napoleonic Wars, where the Dutch having fallen subject to France, saw their colonies captured by Britain. The Dutch later became less involved in India, as they had the Dutch East Indies (now Indonesia).

== English and British India ==
=== Rivalry with the Netherlands ===
At the end of the 16th century, England and the United Netherlands began to challenge Portugal's monopoly of trade with Asia, forming private joint-stock companies to finance the voyages: the English (later British) East India Company, and the Dutch East India Company, were chartered in 1600 and 1602 respectively. These companies were intended to carry on the lucrative spice trade, and they focused their efforts on the areas of production, especially the Indonesian archipelago the "Spice Islands", and on India as an important market for the trade. The close proximity of London and Amsterdam across the North Sea, and the intense rivalry between England and the Netherlands, inevitably led to conflict between the two companies, with the Dutch gaining the upper hand in the Moluccas (previously a Portuguese stronghold) after the withdrawal of the English in 1622, but with the English enjoying more success in India, at Surat, after the establishment of a factory in 1613.

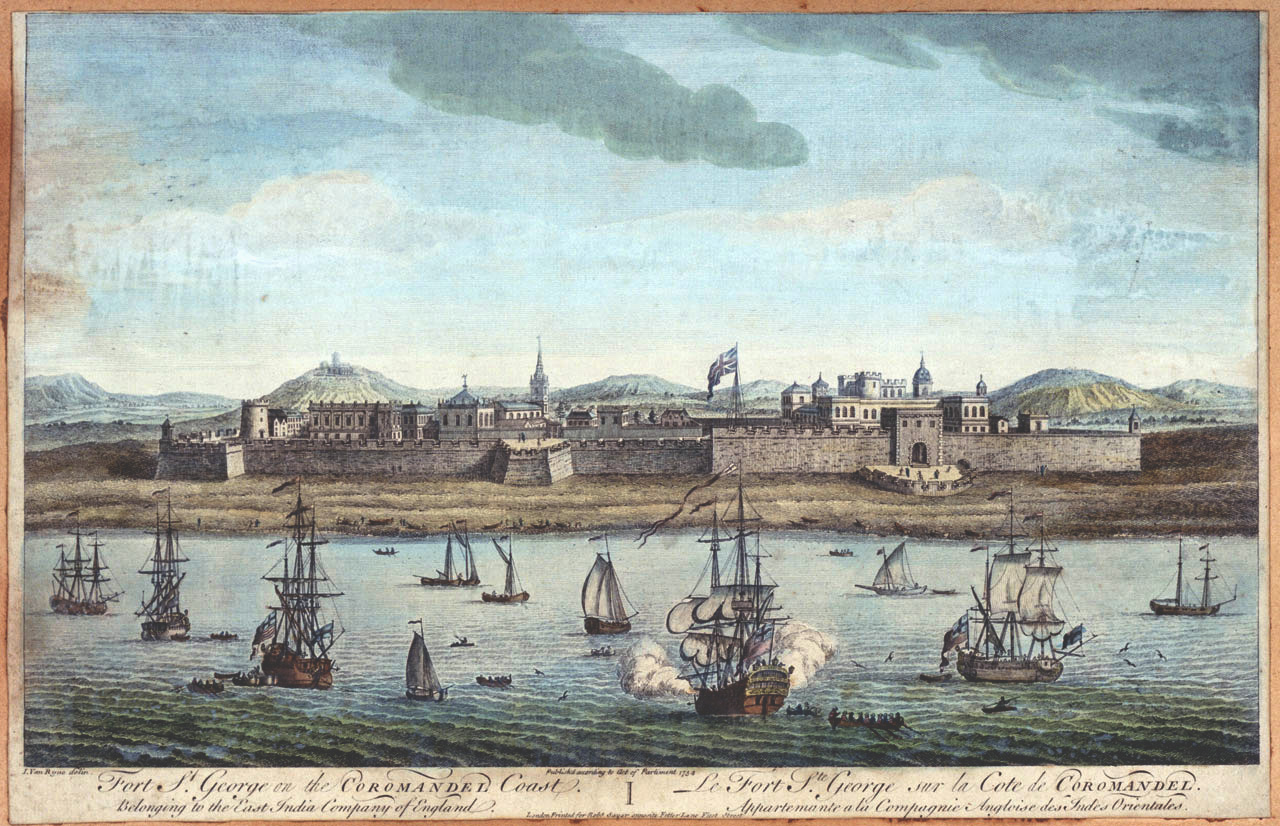
Fort St. George was founded at Madras in 1639.

The Netherlands' more advanced financial system and the three Anglo-Dutch Wars of the 17th century left the Dutch as the dominant naval and trading power in Asia. Hostilities ceased after the Glorious Revolution of 1688, when the Dutch prince William of Orange ascended the English throne, bringing peace between the Netherlands and England. A deal between the two nations left the more valuable spice trade of the Indonesian archipelago to the Netherlands and the textiles industry of India to England, but textiles overtook spices in terms of profitability, so that by 1720, in terms of sales, the English company had overtaken the Dutch. The English East India Company shifted its focus from Surat—a hub of the spice trade network—to Fort St. George.

=== East India Company ===
In 1757, Mir Jafar, the commander-in-chief of the army of the Nawab of Bengal, along with Jagat Seth and some others secretly working with the British, asked for their support to overthrow the Nawab in return for trade grants. The British forces, whose sole duty until then was guarding Company property, were numerically inferior to the Bengali armed forces. At the Battle of Plassey on 23 June 1757, fought between the British under the command of Robert Clive and the Nawab, Mir Jafar's forces betrayed the Nawab and helped them to defeat him. Jafar was installed on the throne as a British subservient ruler. The battle transformed British perspective as they realised their strength and potential to conquer smaller Indian kingdoms and marked the beginning of the imperial or colonial era in South Asia.

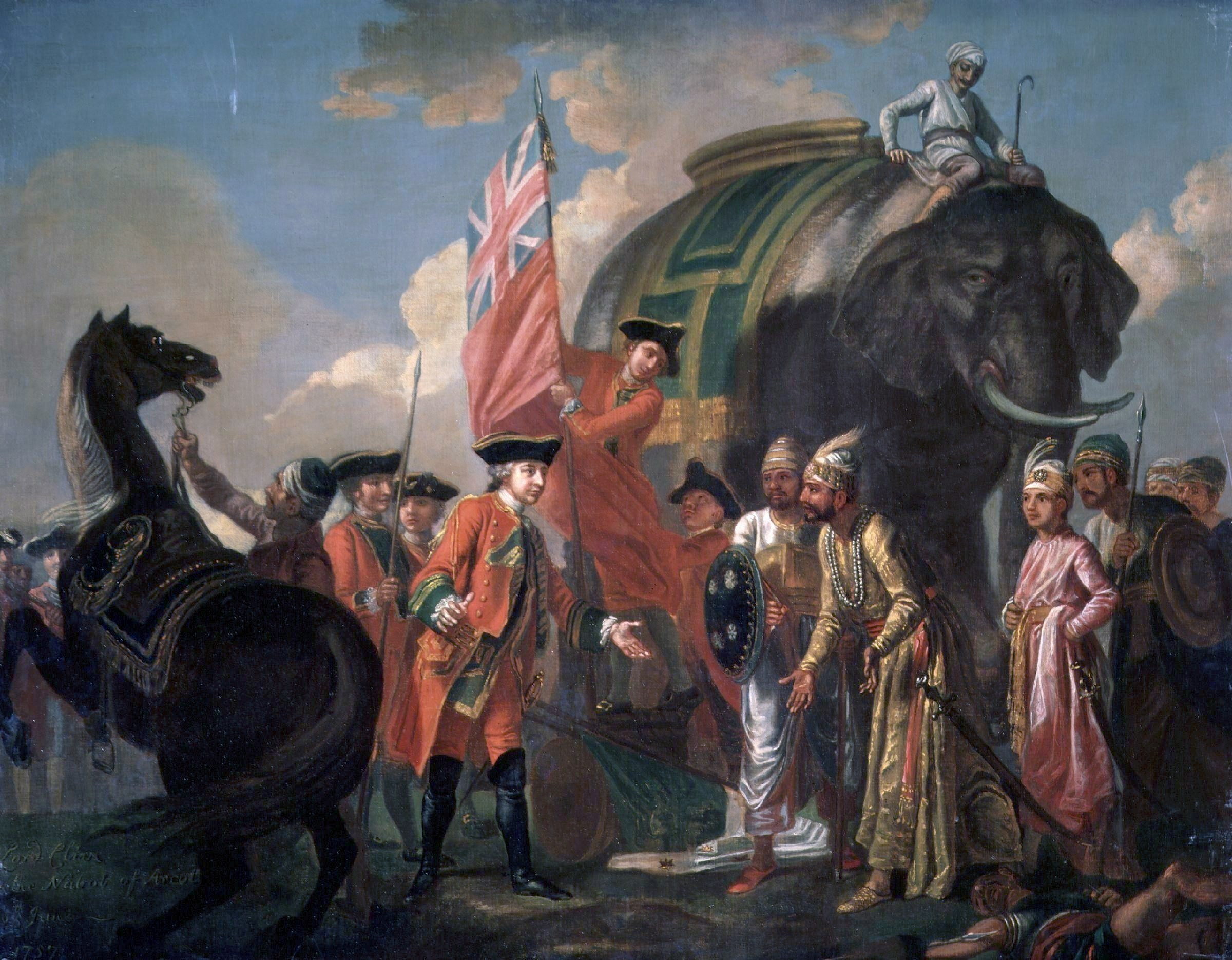
Lord Clive meeting with Mir Jafar after the Battle of Plassey by Francis Hayman, depicting Robert Clive meeting with Mir Jafar after the battle of Plassey. The victory at Plassey marked the start of a period form Company expansion which saw them seizing control over the Indian subcontinent and Burma over the next century.

British policy in Asia during the 19th century was chiefly concerned with expanding and protecting its hold on India, viewed as its most important colony and the key to the rest of Asia. The East India Company drove the expansion of the British Empire in Asia. The company's army had first joined forces with the Royal Navy during the Seven Years' War, and the two continued to cooperate in arenas outside India: against the French campaign in Egypt and Syria, the capture of Java from the Netherlands in 1811, the acquisition of Singapore in 1819 and Malacca in 1824, and the First Anglo-Burmese War in 1826.

From its base in India, the company had also been engaged in an increasingly profitable opium export trade to China since the 1730s. This trade helped reverse the trade imbalances resulting from the British imports of tea, which saw large outflows of silver from Britain to China. However it was hugely exploitative and resulted in impoverishing the Indian peasants. In 1839, the confiscation by the Chinese authorities at Canton of 20,000 chests of opium led Britain to attack China in the First Opium War, and the seizure by Britain of the island of Hong Kong, at that time a minor settlement.

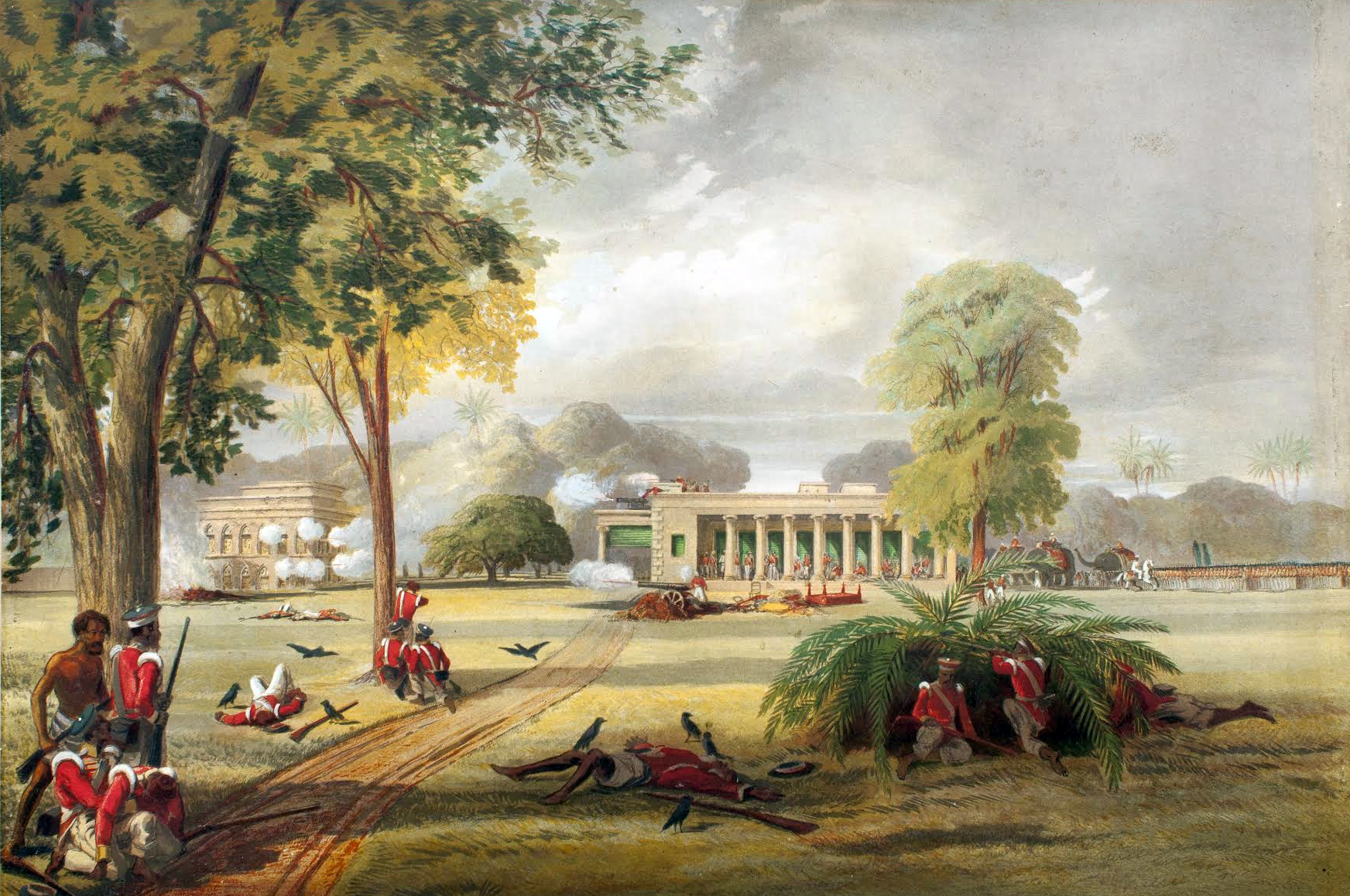
Defence of the Arrah House, 1857 by William Tayler, depicting the siege of Arrah during the Indian Rebellion of 1857

The British had direct or indirect control over all parts of present-day India before the middle of the 19th century. In 1857, a local rebellion by a group of sepoys escalated into the Indian Rebellion of 1857, which took six months to suppress with heavy loss of life on both sides; with British casualties numbering in the thousands and Indian casualties numbering in the hundreds of thousands. The trigger for the rebellion has been a subject of dispute among historians. The rebellion, although short-lived, was triggered by attempts from the East India Company to expand its control in India. According to Olson, several reasons may have triggered the rebellion. For example, Olson concludes that the East India Company's attempt to annex and expand its direct control of India, by arbitrary laws such as Doctrine of Lapse, combined with discrimination in employment against Indians, contributed to the 1857 Rebellion. The East India Company officers lived lavish lives, the company finances were in shambles, and the company's effectiveness in India was examined by the British crown after 1858. As a result, the East India Company lost its powers of government and British India formally came under direct Crown control, with an appointed governor-general of India. The East India Company was dissolved the following year in 1858. A few years later, Queen Victoria took the title of Empress of India.

British Raj-era photograph of Mahatma Gandhi during the Salt March, which gave a critical impetus to the Indian independence movement

=== British Raj ===
India suffered a series of crop failures in the late 19th century, leading to widespread famines that caused tens of millions of deaths in India. Responding to earlier famines as threats to the stability of their control, the East India Company had already begun to concern itself with famine prevention during the early colonial period. This greatly expanded during the Raj, in which commissions were set up after each famine to investigate the causes and implement new policies, which took until the early 1900s to take an effect.

The slow but momentous reform movement developed gradually into the Indian independence movement. During the First World War, the hitherto bourgeois "home-rule" movement was transformed into a popular mass movement by Mahatma Gandhi, a pacifist lawyer. Revolutionaries such as Bagha Jatin, Khudiram Bose, Bhagat Singh, Chandrashekar Azad, Surya Sen, Subhas Chandra Bose differed from Gandhi in their use of violence during their campaigns against British rule. The independence movement attained its objective with the independence of Pakistan and India on 14 and 15 August 1947 respectively.

== French ==
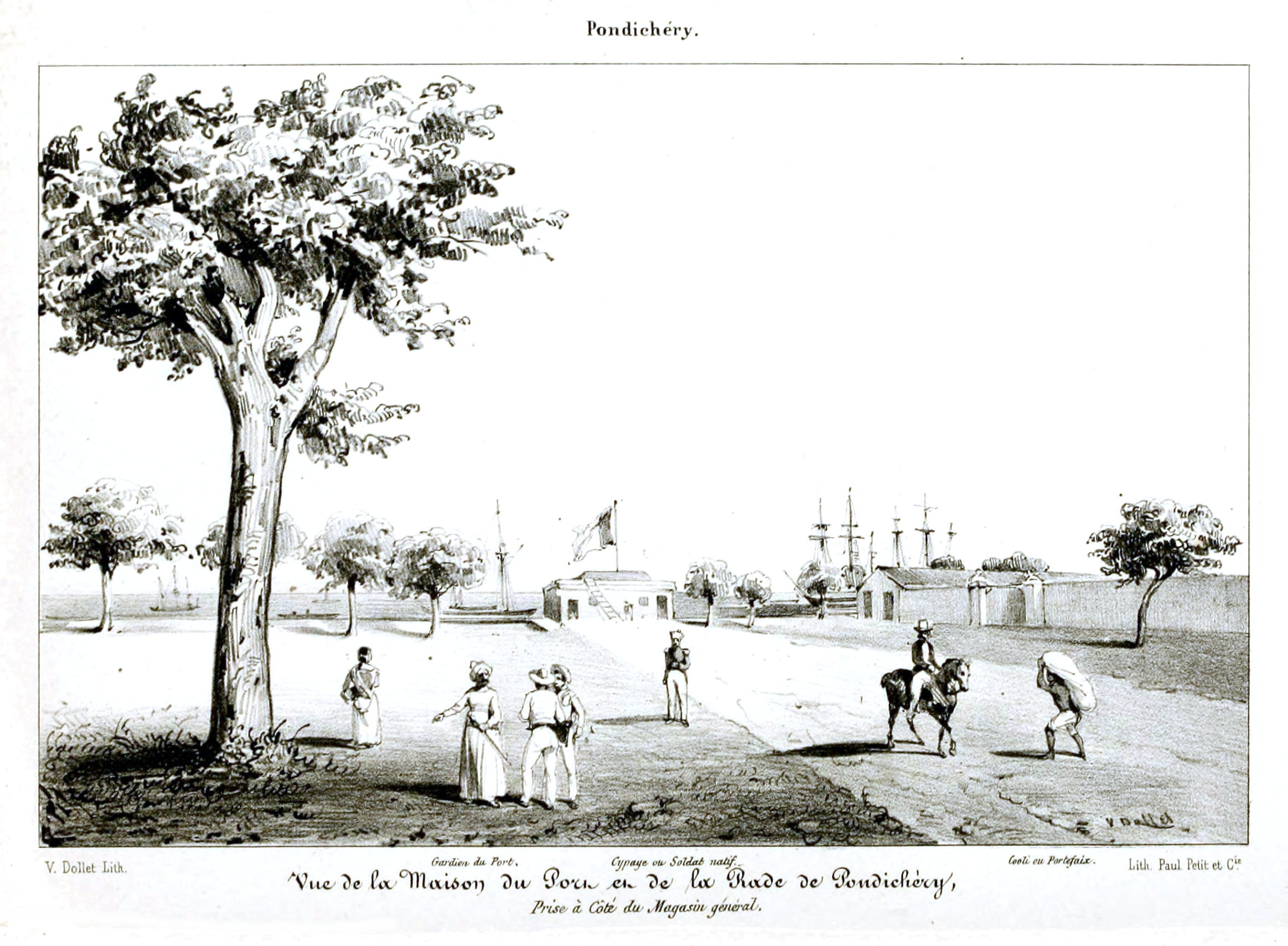
View of Pondicherry in 1843

Following the Portuguese, English, and Dutch, the French also established trading bases in India. Their first establishment was in Pondicherry on the Coromandel Coast in southeastern India in 1674. Subsequent French settlements were Chandernagore in Bengal, northeastern India in 1688, Yanam in Andhra Pradesh in 1723, Mahe in 1725, and Karaikal in 1739. The French were constantly in conflict with the Dutch and later on mainly with the British in India. At the height of French power in the mid-18th century, the French established several outposts in southern India and the area lying in today's northern Andhra Pradesh and Odisha. Between 1744 and 1761, the British and the French repeatedly attacked and conquered each other's forts and towns in southeastern India and in Bengal in the northeast. After some initial French successes, the British decisively defeated the French in Bengal in the Battle of Plassey in 1757 and in the southeast in 1761 in the Battle of Wandiwash, after which the British East India Company was the supreme military and political power in southern India as well as in Bengal. In the following decades, it gradually increased the size of the territories under its control. The enclaves of Pondichéry, Karaikal, Yanam, Mahé, and Chandernagore were returned to France in 1816 and were integrated with the Republic of India in 1954.

== Danish ==
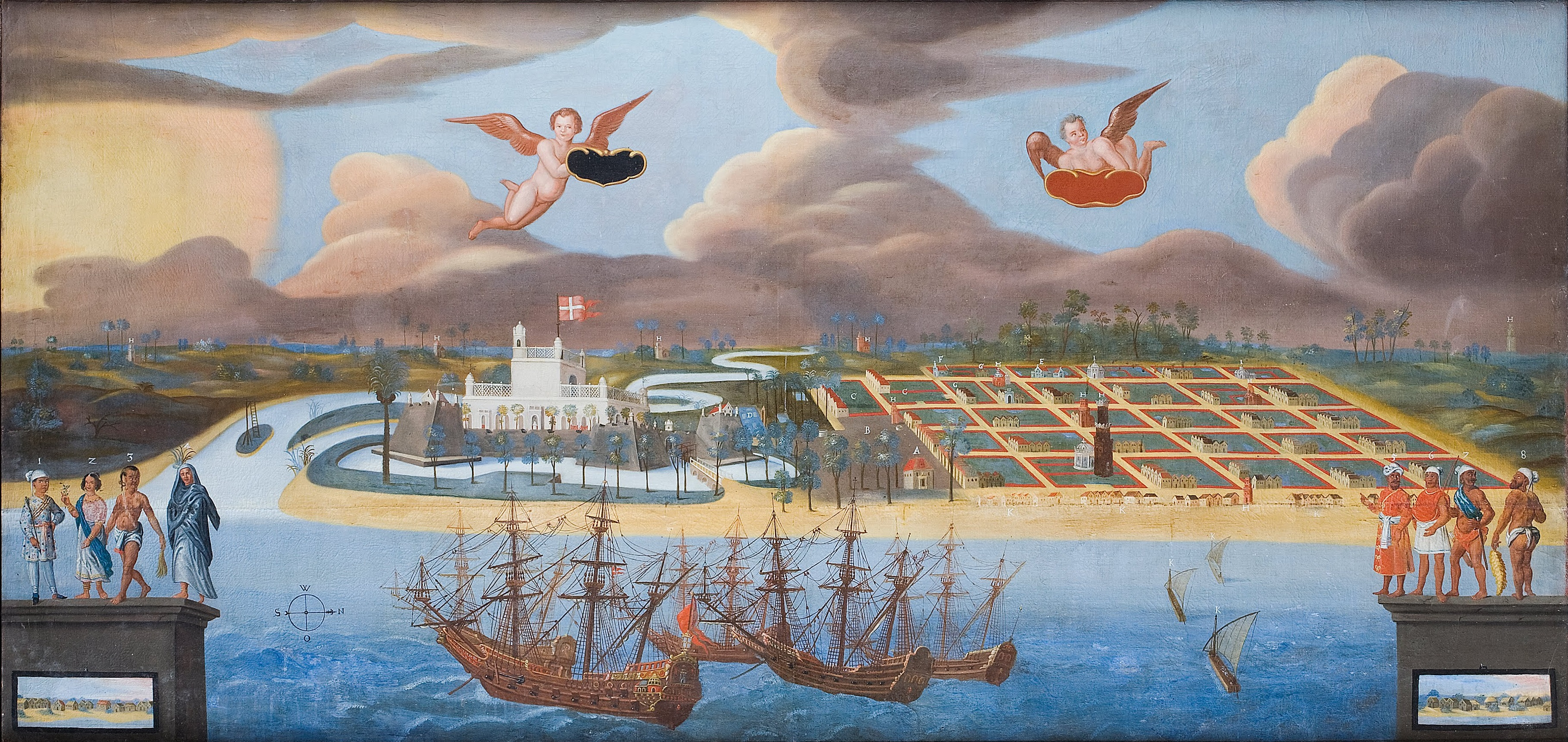
Fort Dansborg at Tranquebar, built by Ove Gjedde, c. 1658

Denmark held several factories in India for more than 200 years, but the Danish presence in India was of little significance to the major European powers, as they presented neither a military nor a mercantile threat. Denmark–Norway established trading outposts in Tranquebar, Tamil Nadu (1620); Serampore, West Bengal (1755); Calicut, Kerala (1752) and the Nicobar Islands (1750s). At one time, the main Danish and Swedish East Asia companies together imported more tea to Europe than the British did. Their outposts lost economic and strategic importance, and Tranquebar, the last Danish outpost, was sold to the British on 16 October 1868.

== Smaller colonies ==
=== Sweden ===
The Swedish East India Company (1731–1813) briefly possessed a colonial factory in Parangipettai for about one month of 1733 before being expelled by a combined Anglo–French force.

=== Austria ===
The Austrian colonisation of the Nicobar Islands (German: Nikobaren, renamed to the Theresia Islands [Theresia-Inseln]) involved a series of three separate attempts to colonise and settle the Nicobar Islands by the Habsburg monarchy, and later the Austrian Empire, between 1778 and 1886. During the period of Austrian colonisation, the Nicobar Islands were previously colonised by the Danish in 1756, but were abandoned due to multiple outbreaks of malaria.

=== Japan ===
The Andaman and Nicobar Islands were briefly occupied and administered by the Empire of Japan during World War II. Notionally this government continued to administer the islands, which were almost the only territory it ever colonized, until British India retook them in 1945, following the Battle of Kohima.

== Wars ==
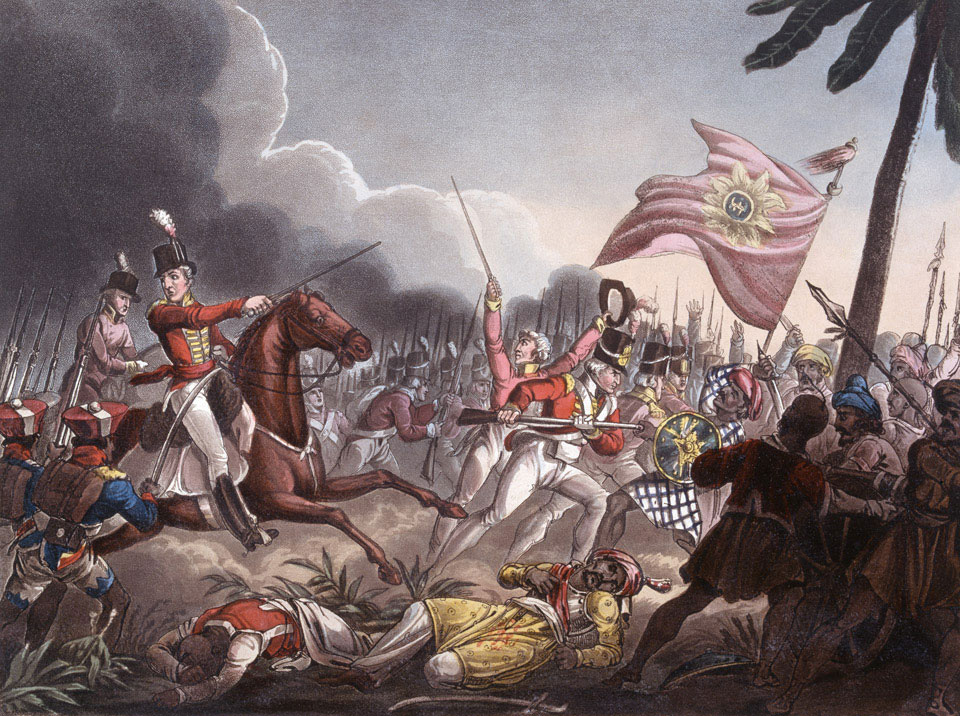
Major General Wellesley commanding his troops at the Battle of Assaye, 1803

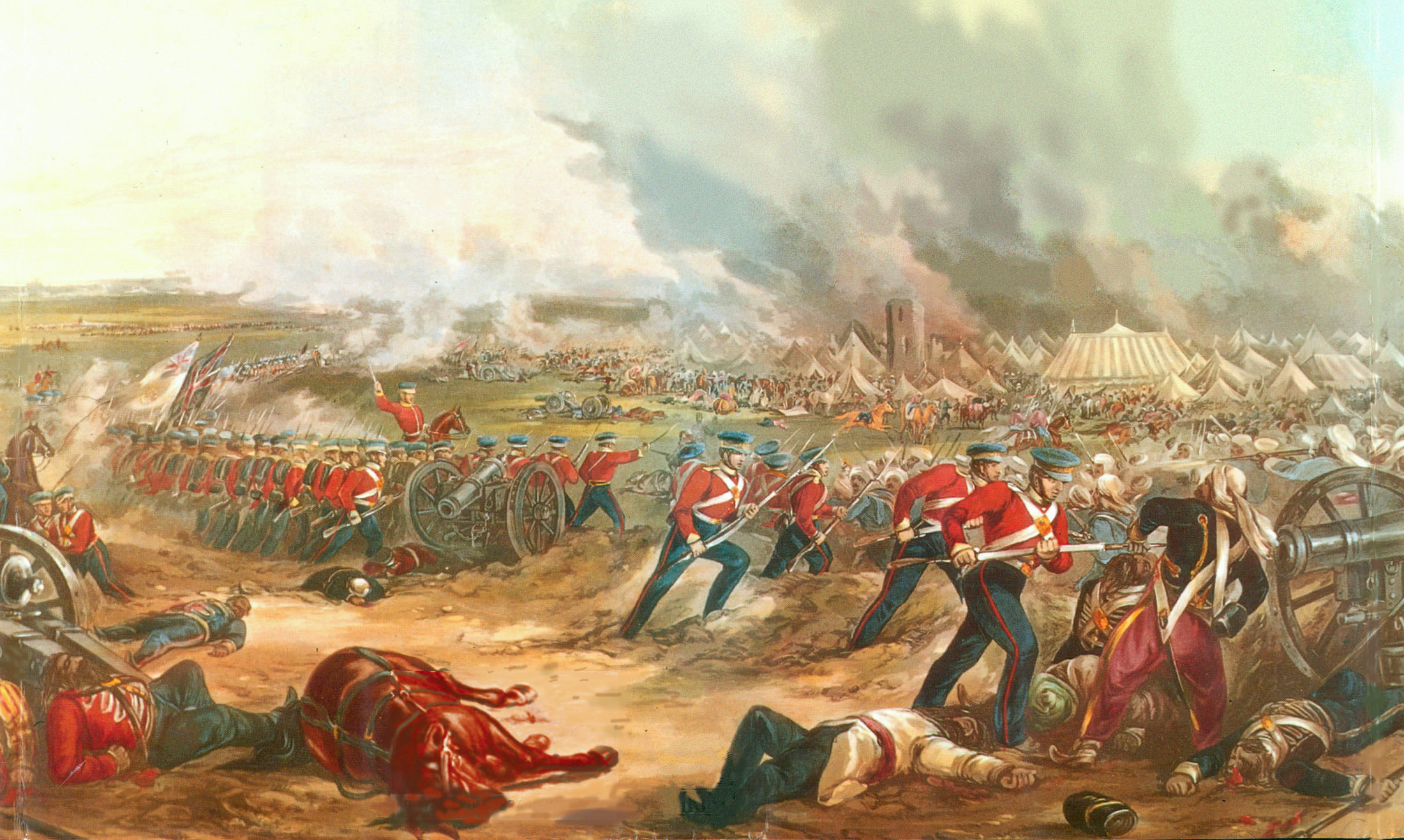
The Battle of Ferozeshah during the First Anglo-Sikh War, 1845

The wars that took place involving the British East India Company or British India during the colonial era:

- Anglo-Afghan Wars
- Anglo-Burmese Wars
- Anglo-Manipur War
- Anglo-Maratha Wars
- Anglo-Mysore Wars
- Anglo-Nepalese War (Gorkha War)
- Anglo-Sikh War
- British conquest of Sindh
- Indian Rebellion of 1857 (First War of Independence, Sepoy Mutiny)
- Polygar Wars
- World War I: see Indian Army during World War I, Bombardment of Madras
- World War II: see Indian Army during World War II

== See also ==
- Ancient India
  - Greater India
  - Indosphere
  - Sanskritization
  - Spread of Buddhism in Southeast Asia
  - Spread of Hinduism in Southeast Asia
- Indian empires
  - Maurya Empire
  - Chola Empire
  - Mughal Empire
  - Maratha Empire
  - Sikh Empire
- British Raj
  - Economy of India under the British Raj
  - Economy of India under Company rule
  - Opposition to the partition of India
- List of Indian Princely States
  - Arakkal Kingdom
  - Hyderabad State
  - Kingdom of Mysore
  - Kingdom of Travancore
  - Rajput States
  - Kingdom of Calicut
