= Calcutta Bank (1824) =

Bank established in India in 1824

The Calcutta Bank
- Type: Private sector
- Industry: Banking, Insurance, Capital Markets and allied industries
- Founded: 1 April 1824; 202 years ago
- Defunct: 31 March 1828
- Fate: merged with The Commercial Bank to form The Union Bank (1828) in 1828
- Headquarters: India
- Number of locations: Bengal Presidency
- Area served: India
- Products: Deposits, Personal Banking Schemes, C & I Banking Schemes, Agri Banking Schemes, SME Banking Schemes
- Services: Banking, Trade Finance

The Calcutta Bank was a bank founded in the year 1824 in British India. The bank was the twelfth oldest bank in India.

The bank was merged with The Commercial Bank (1819) to form The Union Bank (1828) in 1828. The Union Bank itself became defunct in 1848.

== History ==
=== Founding ===
The bank was established in 1824 by the British agency house of Palmer and Company.

The bank played a major role in the early economic history of East Bengal and Bangladesh.

=== Management ===
Although the bank was largely a private bank, it enjoyed patronage from the then government of India, the East India Company.

The bank was staffed by mostly British nationals who were drawn mainly from the East India Company.

The bank had most of its offices and branches in East Bengal, which is the present day Bangladesh.

=== Final years ===
The bank lasted in business for only four years and was finally merged with The Commercial Bank (1819) to form The Union Bank (1828) in 1828. In 1828, there was an economic crisis which forced a Bank run on the bank and precipitated the merger with The Commercial Bank (1819) to form The Union Bank (1828) in 1828.

The bank also issued its own currency notes in its four years of existence.

The total value of the banknotes issued by the bank is estimated to be around Rupees 20 lakhs.

== Legacy ==
The bank is notable for being the twelfth oldest bank in India. It is also notable for being one of the first institutions in India to issue its own paper banknotes or currency notes.

The ability of private banks to issue their own currency notes was taken away by The Paper Currency Act, 1861.

== See also ==
- Indian banking
- List of banks in India
