= Sylph (1831 ship) =

Clipper ship

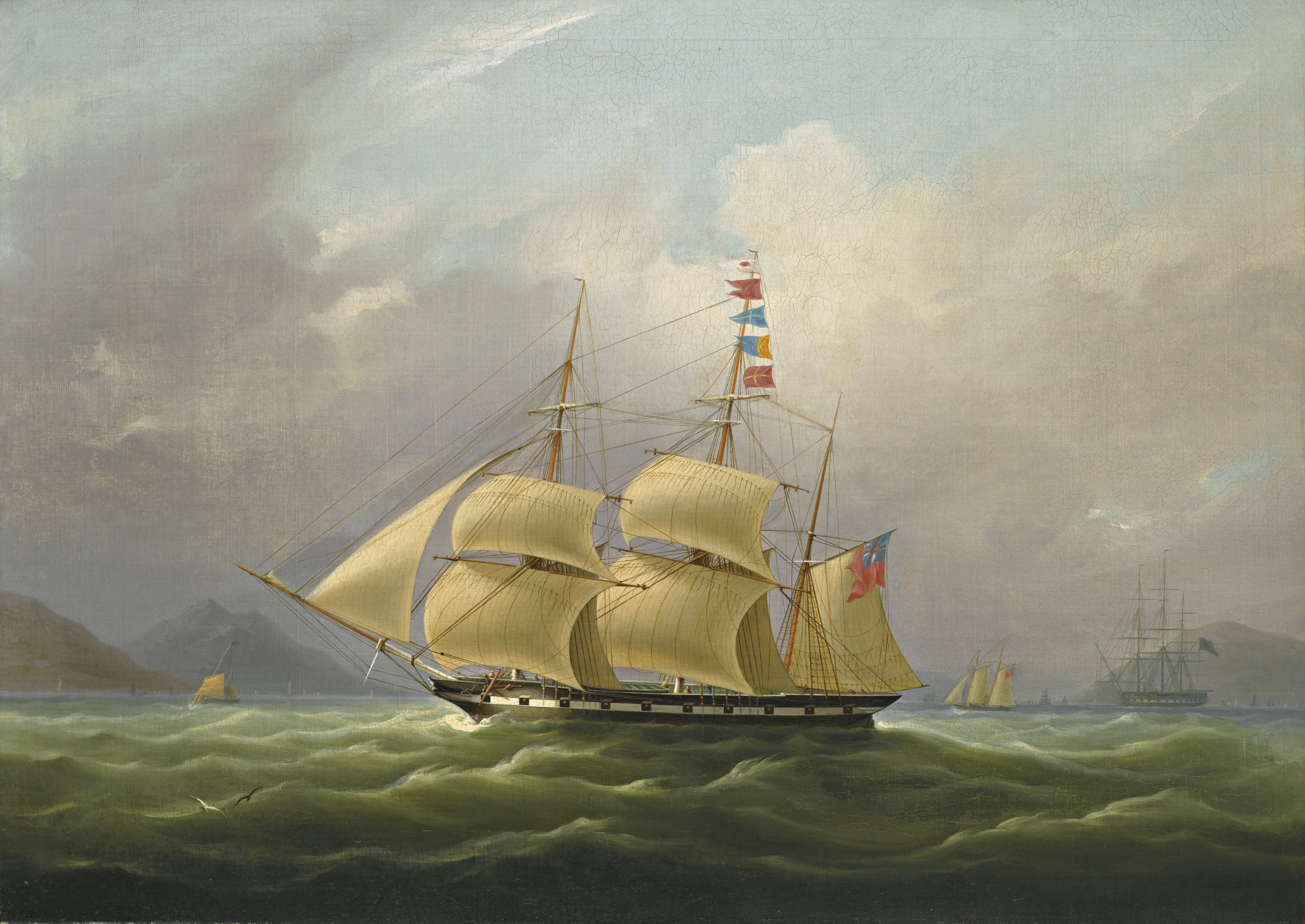
- The opium clipper Sylph off Macao, circa 1838 by William John Huggins, she was owned by Mr. Alexander Robertson, supercargo for the firm of Jardine and Matheson

History

- Name: Sylph
- Namesake: Mythological creature in Western tradition, the Sylph
- Owner: Rustomjee Cowasjee
- Builder: Currie & Co., Sulkea, Calcutta
- Launched: 1831
- Acquired: Jardine Matheson, 1833
- In service: 1832
- Home port: Hong Kong
- Fate: Disappeared en route to Singapore, 1849

General characteristics
- Class & type: Opium clipper
- Tons burthen: 304 (bm)
- Length: Hull, 100 ft (30.48 m)
- Propulsion: Sails
- Complement: 70

Sylph was a clipper ship built at Sulkea, opposite Calcutta, in 1831 for the Parsi merchant Rustomjee Cowasjee. After her purchase by the Hong Kong–based merchant house Jardine Matheson, in 1833 Sylph set a speed record by sailing from Calcutta to Macao in 17 days, 17 hours. Her primary role was to transport opium between various ports in the Far East. She disappeared en route to Singapore in 1849.

== History ==
Sylph was designed in London by Sir Robert Seppings, surveyor of the Royal Navy, to the order of a consortium of Calcutta merchants headed by Rustomjee Cowasjee. Two contemporary paintings of Sylph show her to have been a heavily rigged ship with trysails on each mast and a tall, high-peaked spanker.

Sleek, elegant, functional and devoid of ornament, Sylph did not have the rakish lines of the later clippers, yet proved to be particularly swift. She is supposed to have run from the Sandheads to Macao in sixteen days.

Arriving at Macao in September 1832, Sylph unloaded some of the opium she had transported from Calcutta.

William Jardine and James Matheson chartered four vessels to sail north to explore the possibility of new markets for opium. Sylph, Wallace, master, left Lintin on 20 October 1832. Sylph departed with the German Protestant missionary Karl Gützlaff on board as translator. Sylph returned on 29 April 1833.

Jamesina, James Innes, master, left Lintin on 8 November and returned in early spring 1833. The next two vessels were John Biggar, William Makay, master, and Colonel Young, John Rees, master.

During the First Opium War (1839–1842) Jardine Matheson & Co. were offered a premium price for Sylph, an offer they declined on the basis of the huge profits she made from transporting opium.

Sylph and another well-known clipper, Cowasjee Family, were fitted out with extra guns and full European crews during the war, and were joined by the Lady Hayes, belonging to Jardine, Matheson & Co., the three ships sailing in company. While they were sailing among the islands Chinese war junks surrounded them and a fierce battle ensued. But Captains Wallace and Vice, of Sylph and Cowasjee Family, were two of the most experienced captains in the trade, celebrated for their daring and success in dealing with pirates, and the war junks suffered a severe defeat, many of them being sunk; after which the opium clippers had no more trouble.

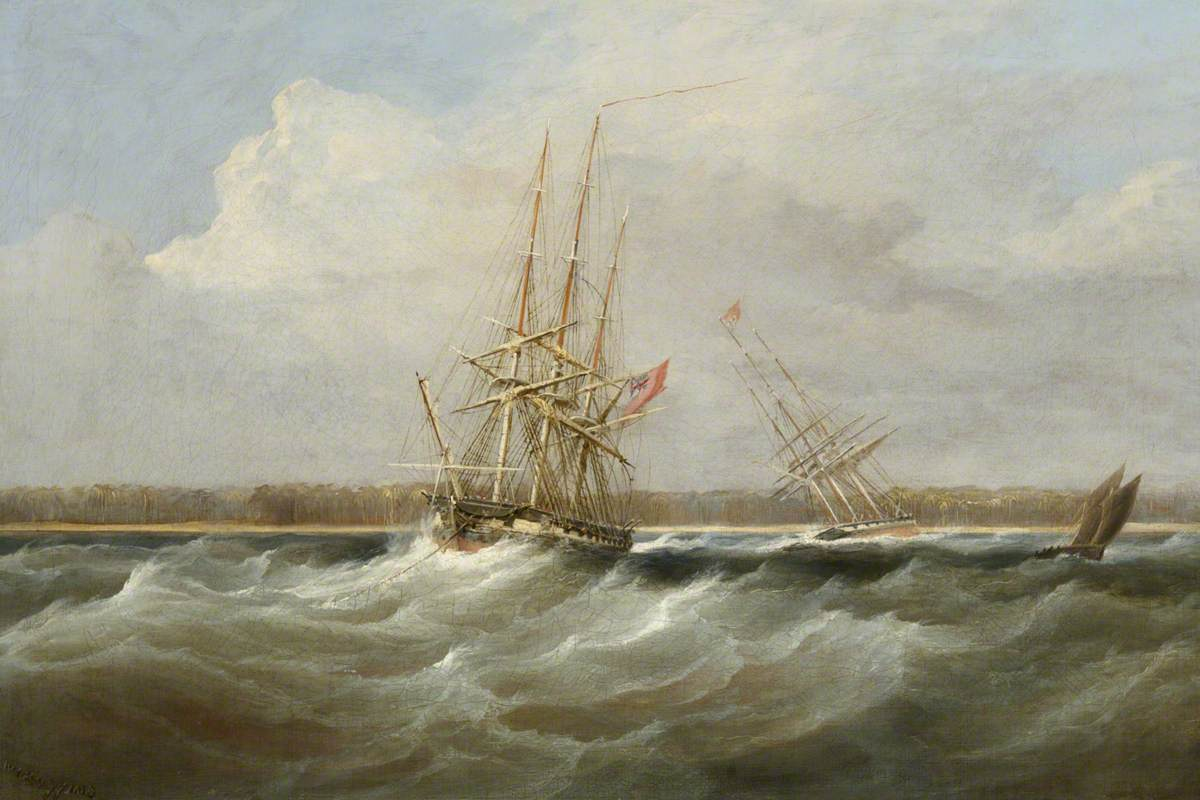
The opium clipper Sylph salvaged by the sloop Clive, by Huggins

While sailing from Calcutta to China and carrying 995 chests of opium, Sylph ran aground on a shoal off the Malay Peninsula on 30 January 1835. According to the Canton Register dated 14 April 1835, Captain Wallace told the vessel's insurers that she had been swamped, then beached by the northeast monsoon. The East Indiaman Clive came to the rescue and the ship and all but two chests of opium were recovered.

== Fate ==
After undergoing re-rigging in Hong Kong in 1848 at a cost of 11,166.22 Mexican dollars, Sylph disappeared en route to Singapore the following year, possibly captured and burned by pirates based on Hainan Island.

In a brief to the International Court of Justice, the Republic of Singapore stated Sylph was wrecked on the rocks of Pedra Branca off the coast of Singapore whilst carrying a cargo of opium to the value of 557,200 Spanish dollars. As Sylph disappeared while en route from Hong Kong to Calcutta, she would not have been carrying opium.
