= Tinkathia System =

Economic policy enforced by the East India Company in India

The Tinkathia System or Teen Kathia System (Hindi: three Kathas), was an economic policy enforced by the East India Company in India. It was practiced largely in Eastern India and in states such as Bihar. The Tinkathia System was challenged by the Champaran Satyagraha led by Mahatma Gandhi, this in turn became a watershed moment in the Indian independence movement and it was based on that peasants had to grow indigo on the 3 parts of the land out of 20 parts.

In other words, a farmer had to grow Indigo in 3 Katha out of 20 Katha (1 Bigha= 20 Katha). In Patna and nearby areas, 1 Katha is equals to 1,361.25 square feet or 151.25 square yard.

== History ==
=== Background ===
In the 17th and 18th century, most of Eastern India came under the rule of the East India Company. India, then, was a major producer of spices and dyes, primarily Indigo. The trade of Indigo was a major business. Several Agency Houses were involved in the Indigo trade. The East India Company compelled Indian farmers to grow cash crops like Indigo which severely affected their livelihoods.

=== Units of Measurement ===
The term Tinkathia literally means three Katha, which is a unit of measurement for land used in India, Nepal and Bangladesh.

In Indian units of measurement, each Bigha is sub-divided into twenty Katha. The Tinkathia System forced Indian peasants to grow only Indigo on three out of every twenty Katha.

== Champaran ==
In his autobiography, Mahathma Gandhi described his visit to Patna and other areas of Bihar where the Tinkathia system and forced cultivation of Indigo was practiced:

The Champaran tenant was bound by law to plant three out of every twenty parts of his land with indigo for his landlord. This system was known as the tinkathia system, as three kathas out of twenty katha had to be planted with indigo.

(1.0 Acre = 32.0 Katha = 1.6 Bigha in Patna).

== Legacy ==
The Tinkathia System which had been in existence for about a century was thus abolished and with it the planters’ raj came to an end. The riots, who had all along remained crushed, now somewhat came to their own, and the superstition that the stain of indigo could never be washed out was exploded.

— M K Gandhi

The Tinkathia System was finally abolished after the Champaran Satyagraha led by Mahatma Gandhi.

== See also ==
- Economy of India under Company rule
- Company rule in India
- List of customary units of measurement in South Asia
- Nepalese customary units of measurement
