= Agency houses in British India =

1600s–1700s trading companies during Company rule

Agency houses in British India were trading companies that arose in 17th and 18th century India during the rule of the British East India Company.

== History ==
During company rule in India, agency houses facilitated the trade of different commodities including textiles, tobacco, and indigo.

The East India Company's monopoly over trade within India meant that agency houses played a less significant role during the 17th and 18th centuries. As power started to shift directly to the British Empire in the 19th century agency houses would start to take a more active role in the colonial economy.

The Charter Act 1813 states that “[the right of trading] should be open to all His Majesty's Subjects”, which permitted the private trade of goods in India, ending the East India Company's monopoly over the Indian colonial economy outside of the tea and opium trade. This new freedom allowed agency houses to trade for their own accounts, increasing the volume of trade handled by these firms dramatically.

Agency houses would facilitate the trade of goods between Britain and India by arranging the import and export of goods to and from India. Companies would buy textiles and other processed British goods on consignment, to be paid later after the products had been sold. Alongside arranging imports, exports of Indian materials such as Indigo, spices, tobacco, and Ivory were major elements of an agency house's business.

Agency houses also served as a crossroads for Indian trading information, often possessing knowledge of which goods would be in demand for both the British and Indian markets. As the agency house's importance grew in the colonial economy, more financial activities would be taken on by these companies.

Many companies would start to accept deposits from British nationals across India. This would end up leaving many widows, soldiers, and civil servants destitute in the 1830s when the collapse of the indigo trade would lead to the collapse of every single agency house in India at the time. Some houses, like Palmer and Co., racked up massive amounts of debt with the London-based firm Cockerell & Trail amounting to £600,000 (valued at £57,000,000 as of 2023) before they collapsed.

Despite the major collapse, many new agency houses took their place during the same decade, building on the foundations of older collapsed companies.

One such company, Carr, Tagore and Company, would be a rare example of a business collaboration between British and Indian nationals. This company, along with a few others, would start the practice of managing joint-stock companies, bringing in outside investors to businesses in India. Carr, Tagore, and Company would manage 6 joint-stock companies before their collapse in 1847 after The Sugar Duties Act 1846 led to a general downturn of the British economy. This downturn would lead to the collapse of twenty agency houses and largely the concept as a whole.

A few agency houses would continue operation during the 19th century until the invention of synthetic indigo dye in 1882 by Adolf von Baeyer at the German company BASF. Eventually trading companies would gradually be replaced by new conglomerates and trading companies.

== Legacy ==
The agency house laid the roots for the economy of colonial India by starting to introduce the first forms of financial practices such as banking, trading, and managing stock. These companies would form the foundation of the managing agency system in India, which would last well into the 20th century. This managing agency system would form the basis for trading public companies in India, controlling 70% of all publicly traded companies in India by 1955. This system came into existence when the agency house Carr, Tagore, and Company first took control of a joint-stock company in 1936.

Agency houses also contributed to the formation of early British banking, with Palmer and Co. forming the Bank of Hindustan. The Bank of Hindustan was a legally separate organization but was closely linked to Palmer and Co. Both companies would collapse in the 1830s, leading to the loss of deposits for many people. While under the control of the East India Company, these agency houses contributed to establishing the Tinkathia System, which would prove to be a major point of contention during the Indian Independence movement.

== List of notable agency houses ==
The agency houses of British India include:

- Alexander and Company - They founded the very first bank in India, the Bank of Hindostan
- Palmer and Company - Founded by officials of the East India Company and one of the wealthiest agency houses
- Fergusson and Company
- Mackintosh and Company
- Cruttenden and Company

== See also ==
- Banking in India
- Economy of India under Company rule
- Company rule in India
