= The Union Bank =

Bank in British India

- Type: Private sector
- Industry: Banking, Insurance, Capital Markets and allied industries
- Founded: 1 April 1828
- Founder: Dwarkanath Tagore
- Defunct: 31 March 1848
- Fate: Defunct
- Headquarters: Calcutta, India
- Number of locations: Bengal Presidency
- Area served: India
- Key people: Dwarkanath Tagore
- Products: Deposits, Personal Banking Schemes, C & I Banking Schemes, Agri Banking Schemes, SME Banking Schemes
- Services: Banking, Trade Finance

The Union Bank was a bank founded in the year 1828 in British India by Prince Dwarkanath Tagore. The bank was the fourteenth oldest bank in India.

== History ==
=== Founding ===
In the 19th century India, Prince Dwarkanath Tagore owned his own trading firm Carr, Tagore and Company. He then separated the financial activities of his firm into a separate banking company. As a result, the Union Bank was founded in 1828. The bank was formed by the merger of two other banks: The Commercial Bank and The Calcutta Bank.

Dwarkanath was the very first Indian to become a director of an Indian bank. All of the previous Indian banks had European directors and founders. Dwarkanath was assisted by his Parsi friend Rustomjee Cowasjee, a notable businessman.

The bank collapsed in 1848.

== See also ==
- Indian banking
- List of banks in India
