= Rustomjee Cowasjee =

Indian shipbuilder (1792–1852)

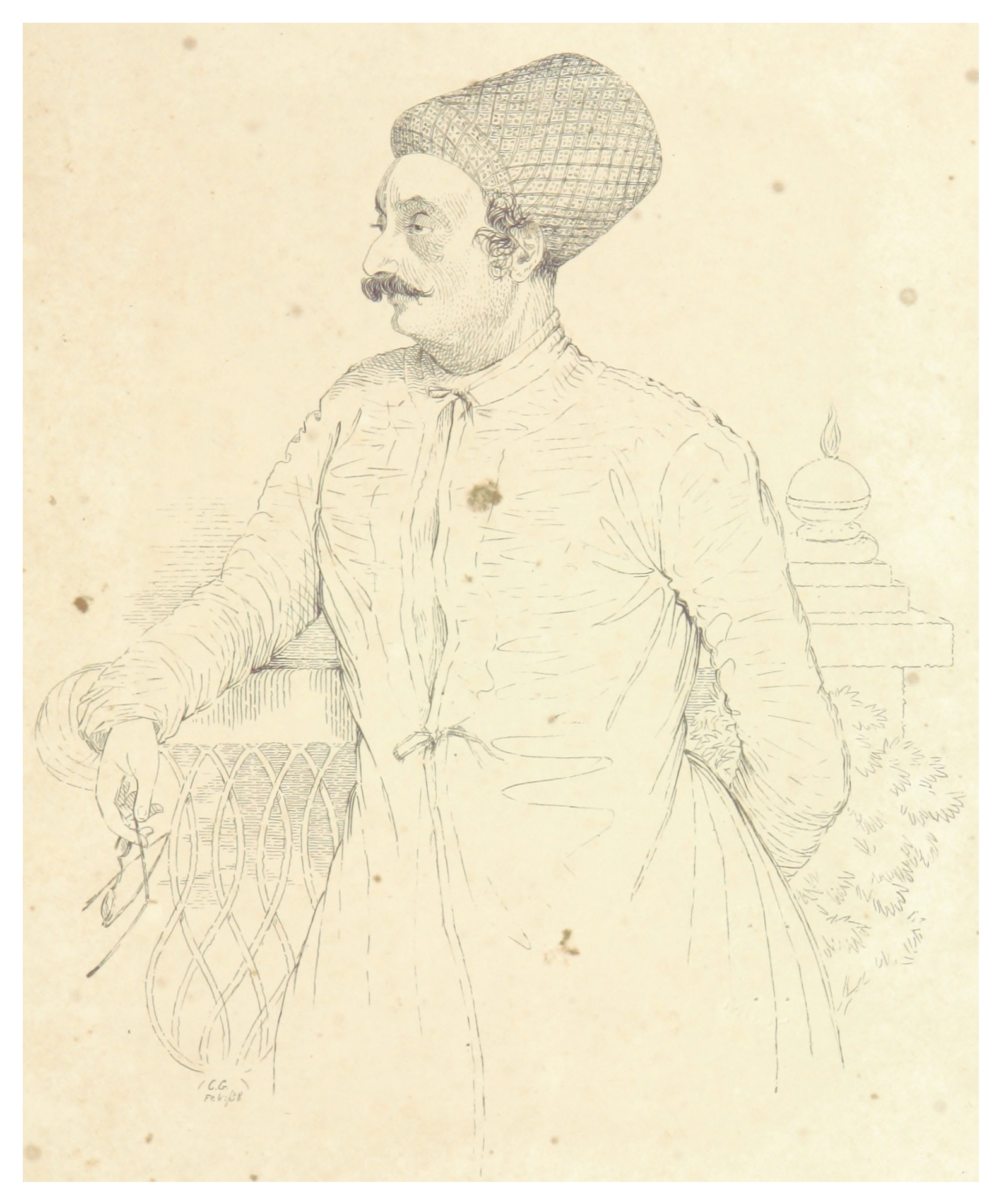
- Rustomjee Cowasjee
- Born: Rustomjee Cowasjee Banajee; 1792; Bombay, India
- Died: 16 April 1852 (aged 59–60); Calcutta, India
- Occupation: Shipbuilder

Rustomjee Cowasjee (1792 – 16 April 1852) was a Parsee Indian businessman and shipbuilder.

== Life ==
He was born on 1792 in Bombay, India.

In his middle age, he migrated with his entire family on a ship from Bombay to Calcutta.

He died on 16 April 1852 in Calcutta, India.

== Career ==
In 1839, he established the oldest Parsee Fire Temple in the city of Calcutta.

=== Shipbuilding ===
He was a prominent shipbuilder of 19th century India. Some of the most notable ships constructed by him include: The Golconda and the Sylph.

=== Banking ===
He was a contemporary of Dwarkanath Tagore, with whom he entered into many business ventures, the most notable among those was The Union Bank (1828).

In 1828, he established the The Union Bank (1828), which is the fourteenth oldest bank in India.

== See also ==
- Sylph (1831 ship)
- The Union Bank (1828)
