= Palmer and Company =

1700s–1830 Agency House in British India

- Company type: Agency House
- Founded: 18th century in British India
- Founders: John Palmer (1767 - 1836)
- Headquarters: Hyderabad, Hyderabad, Hyderabad State, British India
- Area served: British India
- Services: Trading and Banking

The Palmer and Company, Limited, often simply called Palmer and Co. was an Agency House in British India founded by John Palmer (1767-1836), son of General William Palmer (1740-1816) and his first wife Sarah Hazell. Palmer and Co. was the largest Agency House in British India.

Another banking company William Palmer and Company was started in 1810 in Hyderabad by William Palmer (1780-1867), also known as "King Palmer", son of General William Palmer (1740-1816) and his second wife Bibi Faiz Bakhsh ‘Faiz-un-Nisa’ Begum (died 1828) who came from the Oudh ruling family along with the Gujarati moneylender Benkati Das. A partner in this company would later be Sir William Rumbold, 3rd Baronet (1787–1833).

== History ==
=== Background ===
Before the advent of joint-stock banking companies in India, the role of banks was played by agency houses. The agency houses performed various quasi-banking functions which included but were not limited to:

- Accepting deposits (agency houses accepted deposits only from British nationals and other Europeans)
- Financing trade
- Lending of money (primarily to the Government)

=== Business ===
The Palmer and Co. was founded with the name Paxton, Cockerell and Trail. Their name was later changed to Palmer and Co.

In 1829, Palmer and Co. financed and exported more than 16% of all the Indigo produced in British India. As a result, Palmer and Co. came to be known as the Indigo King of Bengal.

=== Failure ===
The Palmer and Co. agency house failed in the year 1830 due to major economic downturn affecting the British India. The main cause of the economic crisis was the unexpected fall in the prices of commodities such as Indigo.

== Controversies ==
Charles Russell (1786–1856) was implicated in a corruption scandal where Lord Hastings, a Governor-General of India, was alleged to have acted partially on behalf of Palmer and Company, a Hyderabad banking house. The Russells were found to have been involved in and profited from the firm's dealings with the Nizam of Hyderabad, Mir Akbar Ali Khan, directly from Hastings' 1816 decision to exempt the house from a ban on lending money to native princes. Henry Russell's successor, Sir Charles Metcalfe, discovered a loan in 1820 that was both fictitious and fraudulent.

== See also ==
- Banking in India
- Company rule in India
- Economy of India under Company rule
