= Economy of India under the British Raj =

The role and scale of British imperial policy during the British Raj (1858 to 1947) on India's relative decline in global GDP remains a topic of debate among economists, historians, and politicians. Some commentators argue that the effect of British rule was negative, and that Britain engaged in a policy of deindustrialisation in India for the benefit of British exporters, which left Indians relatively poorer than before British rule. Others argue that Britain's impact on India was either broadly neutral or positive, and that India's declining share of global GDP was due to other factors, such as new mass production technologies or internal ethnic conflict.

== Economic impact of British imperialism ==
William Digby estimated that from 1870 to 1900, £900 million was transferred from India. In the 17th century, India was a relatively urbanized and commercialized nation with a large export trade, devoted largely to cotton textiles, but also silk, spices, and rice. India was the world's main producer of cotton textiles and had substantial export trade to Britain as well as many other European countries, via the East India Company. According to some commentators, after the British victory over the Mughal Empire (Battle of Buxar), India was deindustrialized by the East India Company, and then the British.

In contrast, historian Niall Ferguson argues that India benefited from the British investment of £270 million in Indian infrastructure, irrigation, and industry by the 1880s (representing nearly one-fifth of all British investment overseas). That amount reached £400 million by 1914. He also writes that the British increased the area of irrigated land eight-fold, to 25% of all land. The village economy's share of total after-tax income rose under British rule from 45% to 54%. Ferguson argues that since the sector represented three quarters of the entire population, their rising share reduced income inequality in India.

=== Impact on trade ===
The British East India Company had forced open the large Indian market to British goods, which could be sold in India without tariffs or duties, compared to local Indian producers who were heavily taxed. At the same time, protectionist policies in Britain, such as bans and high tariffs, were implemented to restrict Indian textiles from being sold there. The British enforced tariffs and duties of 70-80% on textiles produced in India, making them impractical for export. In the early 1700s, India had a hold of 25% of the global textile trade. Raw cotton, however, was imported without tariffs from India to British factories. The factories manufactured textiles from Indian cotton and sold them back to the Indian market. British economic policies gave them a monopoly over India's large market and cotton resources. India served as both a significant supplier of raw goods to British manufacturers and a large captive market for British manufactured goods. With the export of manufactured goods rendered unviable over the period of British rule, India's share of global manufacturing exports dropped from 27% to 2%. In contrast, exports from Britain to India soared with duty-free goods that Indian goods could no longer compete with on quality or price.

The damage to the textile industry went beyond just a decrease in production and export. As industrial production was severely disrupted, Indian workers were forced into agriculture at levels unsustainable by the land. Rural wages were then driven down by the newly crowded market of agricultural workers. These workers had used cloth making as a backup source of income if weather affected their crops. This was no longer a viable option for them. Ultimately, poverty in rural India was catalyzed by the policies deployed by the British.

=== Taxation ===
Taxation by the British, up to 50% of income in parts of India, was so burdensome on the population that they were forced to flee their lands. This form of revenue generation was a departure from the practices deployed by Indian rulers in the past, who primarily raised funds through global and regional trade networks rather than through taxing farmers. Under the zamindari revenue system deployed by the British, farmers were no longer taxed a percentage of their crops produced. Rather, they were taxed a percentage of the land rent payments, regardless of the success or failure of the crops. According to estimates by the British, agricultural taxes were two to three times higher than before British rule, and the highest in the world.

Beginning in 1766, tax revenue generated by Bengal alone amounted to roughly one-quarter of the public revenue collected in Britain. In the 1830s to 1850s, the Company's annual revenue collections of £20 million to £25 million amounted to roughly half of what was generated in Britain.

However, P. J. Marshall argues that the British regime did not make any sharp breaks with the traditional economy, and that control was largely left in the hands of regional rulers. The economy was sustained by general conditions of prosperity through the latter part of the 18th century, excepting the frequent famines with high fatality rates. Marshall notes the British raised revenue through local tax administrators and kept the old Mughal rates of taxation. Marshall wrote that the British managed this primarily indigenous-controlled economy through cooperation with Indian elites.

=== Impact on GDP ===
From 1850 to 1947, India's gross domestic product (GDP) in 1990 international dollar terms grew from $125.7 billion to $213.7 billion, a 70% increase, or an average annual growth rate of 0.55%. This was a higher rate of growth than during the Mughal era (1600–1700), when it had grown by 22%, an annual growth rate of 0.20%, or the longer period of mostly British East Indian company rule from 1700 to 1850 where it grew 39%, or 0.22% annually. However, by the end of British rule, India's economy represented a much smaller proportion of global GDP. In 1820, India's GDP was 16% of the global GDP. By 1870, it had fallen to 12%, and by 1947 to 4%. India's per-capita income remained mostly stagnant during the Raj, with most of its GDP growth coming from an expanding population. Per capita income growth from 1850 to 1900 is estimated to range from 0.75% to 1.25% annually. This figure is buoyed by a decrease in India's rate of population increase stemming from disease and famines. From 1850 to 1947, India's GDP per capita had grown by 16%, from $533 to $618 in 1990 international dollars. According to historical GDP estimates by economist Angus Maddison, India's GDP grew in absolute terms but declined in relative share to the world.

From the 1st century CE to the start of British colonization in India in the 17th century, India's GDP varied between 25% and 35% of the world's total GDP, more than all of Europe combined. It dropped to 2% by the time Britain departed India in 1947. At the same time, the United Kingdom's share of the world economy rose from 2.9% in 1700 to 9% in 1870 alone. Politician Shashi Tharoor claims "The reason is simple: India was governed for the benefit of Britain. Britain's rise for 200 years was financed by its depredation of India."

Under British rule, India's share of the world economy declined from 23% at the beginning of the 18th century down to just over 3% when India gained independence. In 1700, that figure had been 27%. India's GDP (PPP) per capita was stagnant during the Mughal Empire and began to decline prior to the onset of British rule. India's share of global industrial output declined from 25% in 1750 to 2% in 1900. From 1600 to 1871 the ratio of GDP per capita in India to that in Britain fell from more than 60% to less than 15%. India's national debt ballooned under British rule, and half of India's revenue was being siphoned to foreign countries, primarily England. Indian taxes were also used to fund the British Army and its expeditions globally, with 64% of total revenue funding British Indian troops outside of India in 1922.

==== Declining share of world GDP ====
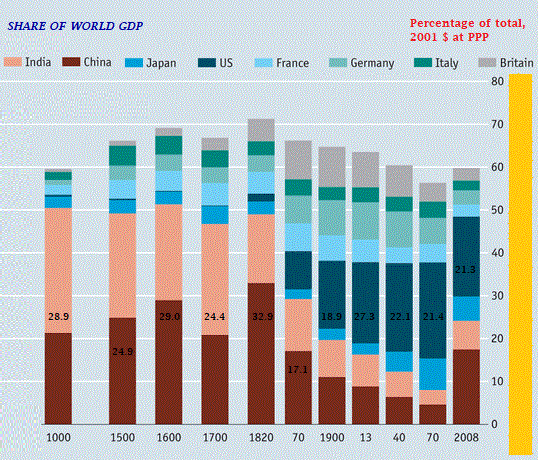
The global contribution to world's GDP by major economies from 1 CE to 2003 CE according to Angus Maddison's estimates. Up until the early 18th century, China and India were the two largest economies by GDP output.

According to British economist Angus Maddison, India's total share of the world economy went from 24.4% in 1700 to 4.2% in 1950. Over the same period Maddison estimates that India's per capita GDP increased slightly from $550 to $619. This would indicate that while India's economy did grow over the period, its total share of the world economy lost ground to the rapidly emerging economies of Europe as well as the newly created United States. India's GDP (PPP) per capita was stagnant during the Mughal Empire and began to decline prior to the onset of British rule. India's share of global industrial output also declined from 25% in 1750 down to 2% in 1900. At the same time the economies of Western Europe and the United States grew rapidly. For example, the United Kingdom's share of the world economy rose from 2.9% in 1700 up to 9% in 1870, and Britain replaced India as the world's largest textile manufacturer in the 19th century. Historian Shireen Moosvi also provides estimates of India's economic output over this period, which are slightly different from the estimates provided by Maddison. Moosvi estimates that Mughal India also had a per-capita income 1.24% higher in the late 16th century than British India had in the early 20th century, and the secondary sector contributed a higher percentage to the economy of the Mughal Empire (18.2%) than it did to the economy of early 20th-century British India (11.2%). In terms of urbanization, Mughal India also had a higher percentage of its population (15%) living in urban centers in 1600 than British India did in the 19th century.

A number of modern economic historians have blamed the colonial rule for the state of India's economy, with investment in Indian industries limited since it was a colony. Under British rule, India experienced deindustrialization. The yarn output of the handloom industry declined from 419 million pounds in 1850 to 240 million pounds in 1900. Due to the colonial policies of the British, a significant transfer of capital from India to England occurred, leading to a massive drain of revenue rather than a systematic effort at modernisation of the domestic economy.

According to Historian Zareer Masani, "India in 1700 also had 25 per cent of the world's population, meaning that its per capita GDP, the real measure of prosperity, was relatively low, due to its poor productivity as a largely agrarian economy on the eve of global industrialisation, which exponentially multiplied world GDP." With "the major drop in India's per capita GDP occurring between 1600 and 1750".

GDP (PPP) in 1990 international dollars
Year	GDP (Millions of 1990 dollars)	GDP per capita (1990 dollars)	Avg % GDP growth
1850	125,681	533	—
1870	134,882	533	0.354
1890	163,341	584	0.962
1900	170,466	599	0.428
1910	210,439	697	2.129
1920	194,051	635	−0.807
1930	244,097	726	2.321
1940	265,455	686	0.842
1947	213,680	618	−3.052

== Absence of industrialisation ==
=== The views of historians and economists ===
In the 17th century, India was a relatively urbanised and commercialised nation with a buoyant export trade devoted largely to cotton textiles, but also included silk, spices, and rice. India was the world's main producer of cotton textiles and had a substantial export trade to Britain, as well as many other European countries via the East India Company (EIC).

India's share of global industrial output also declined from 25% in 1750 down to 2% in 1900. At the same time, the United Kingdom's share of the world economy rose from 2.9% in 1700 up to 9% in 1870, and Britain replaced India as the world's largest textile manufacturer in the 19th century.

After the British victory over the Mughal Empire (Battle of Buxar, 1764), India was deindustrialized by the EIC, British and colonial policies.

As the British cotton industry underwent a technological revolution during the late 18th to early 19th centuries, the Indian industry stagnated and was deindustrialized.

As late as 1772, Henry Pattullo, writing about the economic resources of Bengal, commented that their textiles were of such unrivaled quality that demand for them could never wane. However, by the early 19th century, textile exports began to decline; in 1840, the chairman of the East India and China Association told the English parliament: "This company has succeeded in converting India from a manufacturing country into a country exporting raw produce".

Opium was one India's major export crops. Peasants in the eastern Ganges valley gew it under a government monopoly run through Opium Agencies at Patna and Benares, and the government sold it at auction in Calcutta mostly for export to China. Opium accounted for roughly 14% of the government of India's revenue in 1880, falling to about 7% by 1905, and in 1913 the Secretary of State announced that India would not sell opium to China, though the British government's opium monopoly continued until independence in 1947. Richards argued that the monopoly held the price close to the margin of profitability but gave cultivators interest-free advances and protection from market swings, and that most peasants chose freely to grow poppy. Rolf Bauer concluded from archival cost records that cultivators were paid less than it cost to grow the crop, under a system that relied on coercion. Bauer found that farmers who could not easily get credit were offered interest-free advances, but the costs of rent, manure, irrigation and hired labour came to more than the farmers earned from their opium so the price they were paid did not cover their costs even with the advances.

An often repeated legend is that the EIC cut off the thumbs of weavers in Bengal to destroy the indigenous weaving industry in favour of British textile imports. However, this is generally considered to be a myth originating from William Bolts' 1772 account, in which he alleges that a number of silk spinners had cut off their own thumbs in protest of poor working conditions.

Economic historian Prasannan Parthasarathi pointed to earnings data that show real wages in 18th-century Bengal and Mysore were comparable to Britain. Workers in the textile industry, for example, earned more in Bengal and Mysore than they did in Britain. There is also evidence that labour in Britain had to work longer hours than in Bengal and South India. According to economic historian Immanuel Wallerstein, per-capita agricultural output and standards of consumption in 17th-century Mughal India were probably higher than in 17th-century Europe and certainly higher than in early 20th-century British India.

British control of trade and exports of cheap Manchester cotton are cited as significant factors for why Britain industrialized first before France, Germany, India and China, though Indian textiles had maintained a competitive price advantage over British textiles until the 19th century. Several historians point to the colonization of India as a major factor in both India's deindustrialization and Britain's Industrial Revolution.

== Indian Ordnance Factories ==
The history and development of the Indian Ordnance Factories is directly linked to the British Raj in India. The East India Company considered military hardware to be a vital element for securing their economic interest in India and for increasing their political power. In 1775, the British East India Company accepted the establishment of the Board of Ordnance at Fort William, Calcutta. This marked the official beginning of the Army Ordnance and the Industrial Revolution in India.

In 1787, a gunpowder factory was established at Ichapore. Production began in 1791, and the site was later used as a rifle factory beginning in 1904. In 1801, the Gun Carriage Agency (now known as Gun & Shell Factory), was established at Cossipore, Calcutta, and production began on 18 March 1802. This is the oldest ordnance factory in India still in existence. There were eighteen ordnance factories before India became independent in 1947.

== Agriculture and industry ==
Between 1860 and 1914, agriculture grew by expanding the land frontier which became more difficult after 1914.

The entrepreneur Jamsetji Tata began his industrial career in 1877 with the Central India Spinning, Weaving, and Manufacturing Company in Bombay. While other Indian mills produced cheap coarse yarn (and later cloth) using local short-staple cotton and cheap machinery imported from Britain, Tata did much better by importing expensive longer-stapled cotton from Egypt and buying more complex ring-spindle machinery from the United States to spin finer yarn that could compete with imports from Britain. The effect on industry was a combination of two distinct processes: a robust growth of modern factories and a slow growth in artisanal industry, which achieved higher growth by changing from traditional household-based production to wage-based production.

In the 1890s, Tata launched plans to expand into heavy industry using Indian funding after being denied permission by the British since 1883. The Raj did not provide capital, but it was aware of Britain's declining position against the U.S. and Germany in the steel industry, and it wanted steel mills in India so it promised to purchase any surplus steel Tata could not sell. However, the British controlled government and railways, the largest consumers of steel in the country, mandated the use of steel with a BSSS (British Standard Specification Steel) rating, while the rest of the world used a NBSSS (Non-British Standard Specification Steel) rating. This obstructed Indian steelmakers' ability to produce cheaper NBSSS rated steel, making Indian steel uncompetitive in the global market. Britain also placed restrictions on steel imports, making Indian produced BSSS rated steel difficult to export for profit. The Tata Iron and Steel Company (TISCO), opened its plant at Jamshedpur in Bihar in 1908. It became the leading iron and steel producer in India, with 120,000 employees in 1945. According to The Oxford Dictionary of National Biography, TISCO "became a symbol of Indian technical skill, managerial competence, and entrepreneurial flair".

== Irrigation ==
The British Raj invested in infrastructure including canals and irrigation systems. The Ganges Canal reached 350 miles from Haridwar to Cawnpore, and supplied thousands of miles of distribution canals. By 1900, the Raj had the largest irrigation system in the world. In all, the amount of irrigated land rose eightfold. Historian David Gilmour says:

By the 1870s the peasantry in the districts irrigated by the Ganges Canal were visibly better fed, housed and dressed than before; by the end of the century the new network of canals in the Punjab had produced an even more prosperous peasantry there.

== Railways ==
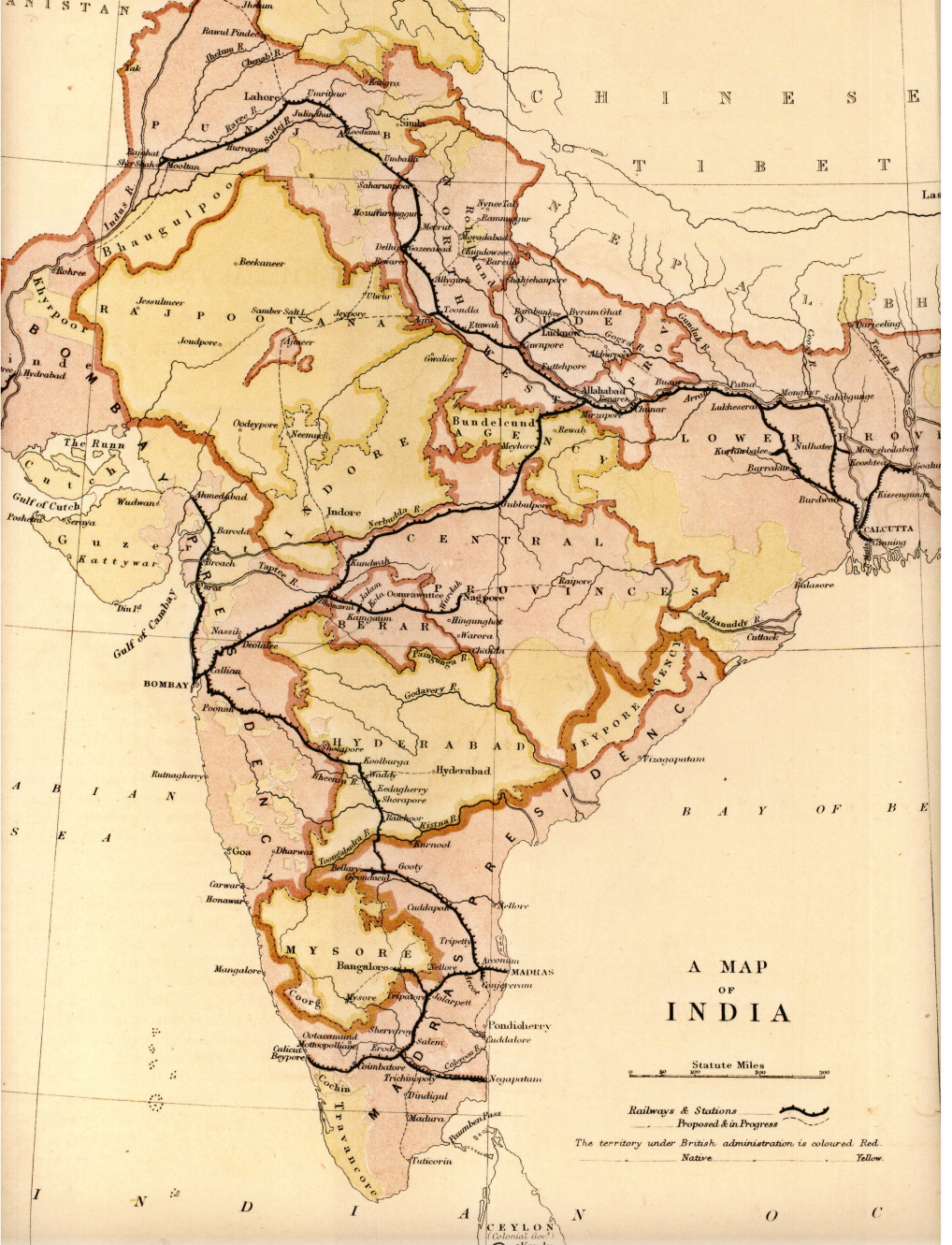
Railway map of India in 1871

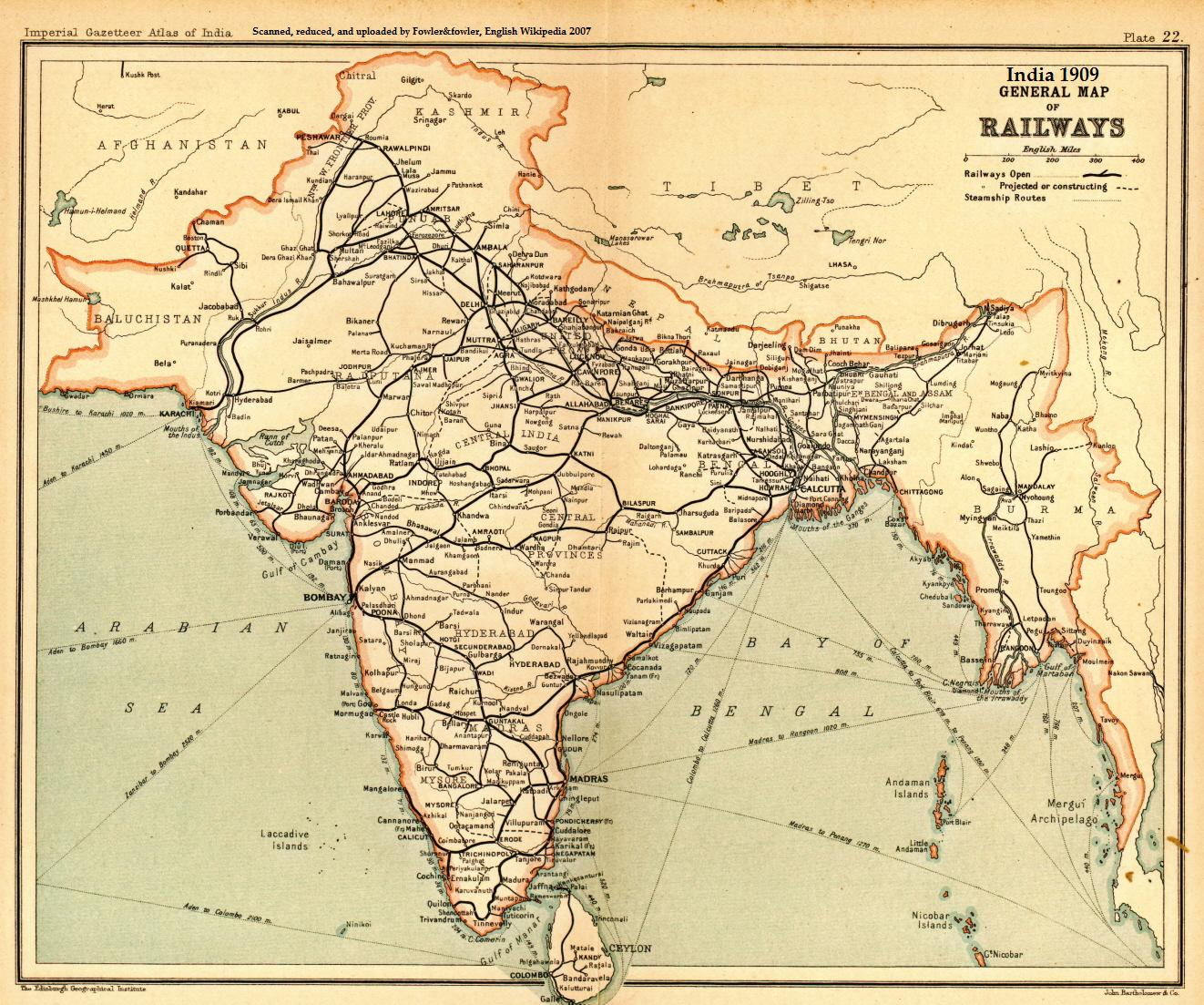
Railway map of India in 1909

British investors built a modern railway system in the late 19th century, which became the fourth largest in the world at the time. The government was supportive of the railways, realizing their value for military use and economic growth, and they were designed to improve defense and foreign trade. While private British companies invested in the railways, they invested very little outside of this project. From 1890, the year main stage construction was completed, to 1914, the proportion of overseas British capital invested in India declined from 19% to 10%. At first, the railways were privately owned and operated by British administrators, engineers, and craftsmen, and the only unskilled workers were Indians.

A plan for a rail system in India was first put forward in 1832. The first train in India ran from Red Hills to Chintadripet bridge in Madras in 1837. It was called Red Hill Railway. It was used for freight transport only. A few more short lines were built in the 1830s and 1840s, but they did not interconnect and were used for freight transport only. The East India Company, and later the colonial government, encouraged new railway companies backed by private investors under a scheme that would provide land and guarantee an annual return of up to 5% during the initial years of operation. The companies were to build and operate the lines under a 99-year lease, with the government having the option to buy them earlier. In 1854, Governor-General Lord Dalhousie formulated a plan to construct a network of trunk lines connecting the principal regions of India. Encouraged by the government guarantees, investments flowed in and a series of new rail companies were established, leading to rapid expansion of the rail system in India.

In 1853, the first passenger train service was inaugurated between Bori Bunder in Bombay and Thane, covering a distance of 34 km (21 mi). The route mileage of this network increased from 1,349 km (838 mi) in 1860 to 25,495 km (15,842 mi) in 1890, mostly radiating inland from the three major port cities of Bombay, Madras, and Calcutta. Most of the railway construction was done by Indian companies supervised by British engineers. The system was heavily built, consisting of sturdy tracks and strong bridges. Several large princely states soon built their own rail systems, and the network spread to almost all the regions in India. By 1900, India had a full range of rail services with diverse ownership and management, operating on broad, meter, and narrow gauge networks.

During World War I, railways were used to transport troops and grain to the ports of Bombay and Karachi en route to Britain, Mesopotamia, and East Africa. With shipments of equipment and parts from Britain curtailed, maintenance became much more difficult. Critical workers entered the army, workshops were converted to make munitions, and the locomotives, rolling stock, and track of some entire lines were shipped to the Middle East. The railways could barely keep up with the increased demand. By the end of the war, the railways had deteriorated badly.

Headrick argues that both the Raj lines and the private companies hired only European supervisors, civil engineers, and even operating personnel such as locomotive engineers. The government's Stores Policy required that bids on railway contracts be made to the India Office in London, shutting out most Indian firms. The railway companies purchased most of their hardware and parts in Britain. There were railway maintenance workshops in India, but they were rarely allowed to manufacture or repair locomotives.

Christensen looks at colonial purpose, local needs, capital, service, and private-versus-public interests. He concludes that making the railways a creature of the state hindered success because railway expenses had to go through the same time-consuming and political budgeting process as did all other state expenses. Railway costs could therefore not be tailored to the timely needs of the railways or their passengers.

== Great Depression ==
The worldwide Great Depression of 1929 had little direct impact on India, with only slight impact on the modern secondary sector. The government did little to alleviate distress, and was focused mostly on shipping gold to Britain. The worst consequences involved deflation, which increased the burden of debt on villagers, while lowering the cost of living. In terms of volume of total economic output, there was no decline between 1929 and 1934. Falling prices for jute and wheat hurt larger growers. The hardest hit sector was jute, based in Bengal, which was an important element in overseas trade. It had prospered in the 1920s, but was hard hit in the 1930s. In terms of employment, there was some decline, while agriculture and small-scale industry exhibited gains. The most successful new industry was sugar, which experienced growth in the 1930s.

== Aftermath ==
The newly independent, but weak Union government's treasury reported annual revenue of £334 million in 1950. In contrast, Nizam Asaf Jah VII of Hyderabad State in South India was widely reported to have a fortune of almost £668 million at that time. Approximately one-sixth of the national population was urban by 1950. The US Dollar was exchanged at 4.97 Indian Rupees.

In 1947, the year India gained its independence, 90% of India's population was rural and 55% lived below the international poverty line. The average life expectancy was 27 years, and the literacy rate (in 1951) was 16.7%.

== See also ==
- List of regions by past GDP (PPP) § Indian
- Exploitation colonialism
- Economy of India under Company rule
- Economic history of India
- Economy of India § British era (1793–1947)
