= Economy of India under Company rule =

The economy of India under Company rule involves the economy of those regions that fell under the rule of the British East India Company between the years 1757 and 1858. The British East India Company (EIC) began ruling parts of the Indian subcontinent beginning with the 1757 Battle of Plassey, which led to the conquest of Bengal Subah and the expansion of the Bengal Presidency (founded in 1699), before the Company extended its influence or rule across most of the subcontinent up until the Indian Rebellion of 1857. The EIC also acquired bases in places like Singapore and China.

== Economic impact ==
A number of historians point to the colonization of India as a major factor in both India's deindustrialization and Britain's Industrial Revolution. The capital amassed from Bengal following its 1757 conquest helped to invest in British industries such as textile manufacture during the Industrial Revolution as well as increase British wealth, while contributing to deindustrialization in Bengal. British colonization forced open the large Indian market to British goods, which could be sold in India without any tariffs or duties, compared to local Indian producers who were heavily taxed, while in Britain protectionist policies such as bans and high tariffs were implemented to restrict Indian textiles from being sold there, whereas raw cotton was imported from India without tariffs to British factories which manufactured textiles from Indian cotton and sold them back to the Indian market. British economic policies gave them a monopoly over India's large market and cotton resources. India served as both a significant supplier of raw goods to British manufacturers and a large captive market for British manufactured goods.

Indian textiles had maintained a competitive advantage over British textiles up until the 19th century, when Britain eventually overtook India as the world's largest cotton textile manufacturer. In 1811, Bengal was still a major exporter of cotton cloth to the Americas and the Indian Ocean. However, Bengali exports declined over the course of the early 19th century, as British exports to Bengal increased, from 25% in 1811 to 93% in 1840. India, which was previously the world's largest economy under the Mughal Empire in 1700, had by 1820 fallen to become the second largest economy, behind Qing China.

== Land revenue ==
In the remnant of the Mughal revenue system existing in pre-1765 Bengal, zamindars, or "land holders," collected revenue on behalf of the Mughal emperor, whose representative, or diwan supervised their activities. In this system, the assortment of rights associated with land were not possessed by a "land owner," but rather shared by the several parties with stake in the land, including the peasant cultivator, the zamindar, and the state. The zamindar served as an intermediary who procured economic rent from the cultivator, and after withholding a percentage for his own expenses, made available the rest, as revenue to the state. Under the Mughal system, the land itself belonged to the state and not to the zamindar, who could transfer only his right to collect rent. On being awarded the diwani or overlordship of Bengal following the Battle of Buxar in 1764, the East India Company found itself short of trained administrators, especially those familiar with local custom and law; tax collection was consequently left in the hands of the existing hereditary collectors. This uncertain foray into land taxation by the Company, may have gravely worsened the impact of a famine that struck Bengal in 1769–70 in which between seven and ten million people—or between a quarter and third of the presidency's population—may have died. However, the company provided little relief either through reduced taxation or by relief efforts, and the economic and cultural impact of the famine was felt decades later, even becoming, a century later, the subject of Bankim Chandra Chatterjee's novel Anandamath.

In 1772, under Warren Hastings, the East India Company took over revenue collection directly in the Bengal Presidency (then Bengal and Bihar), establishing a Board of Revenue with offices in Calcutta and Patna, and moving the existing Mughal revenue records from Murshidabad to Calcutta. In 1773, after Oudh ceded the tributary state of Benaras, the revenue collection system was extended to the territory with a Company Resident in charge. The following year—with a view to preventing corruption—Company district collectors, who were then responsible for revenue collection for an entire district, were replaced with provincial councils at Patna, Murshidabad and Calcutta and with Indian collectors working within each district. The title, "collector," reflected "the centrality of land revenue collection to government in India: it was the government's primary function and it moulded the institutions and patterns of administration."

A riverside scene in rural east Bengal (present-day Bangladesh), 1860

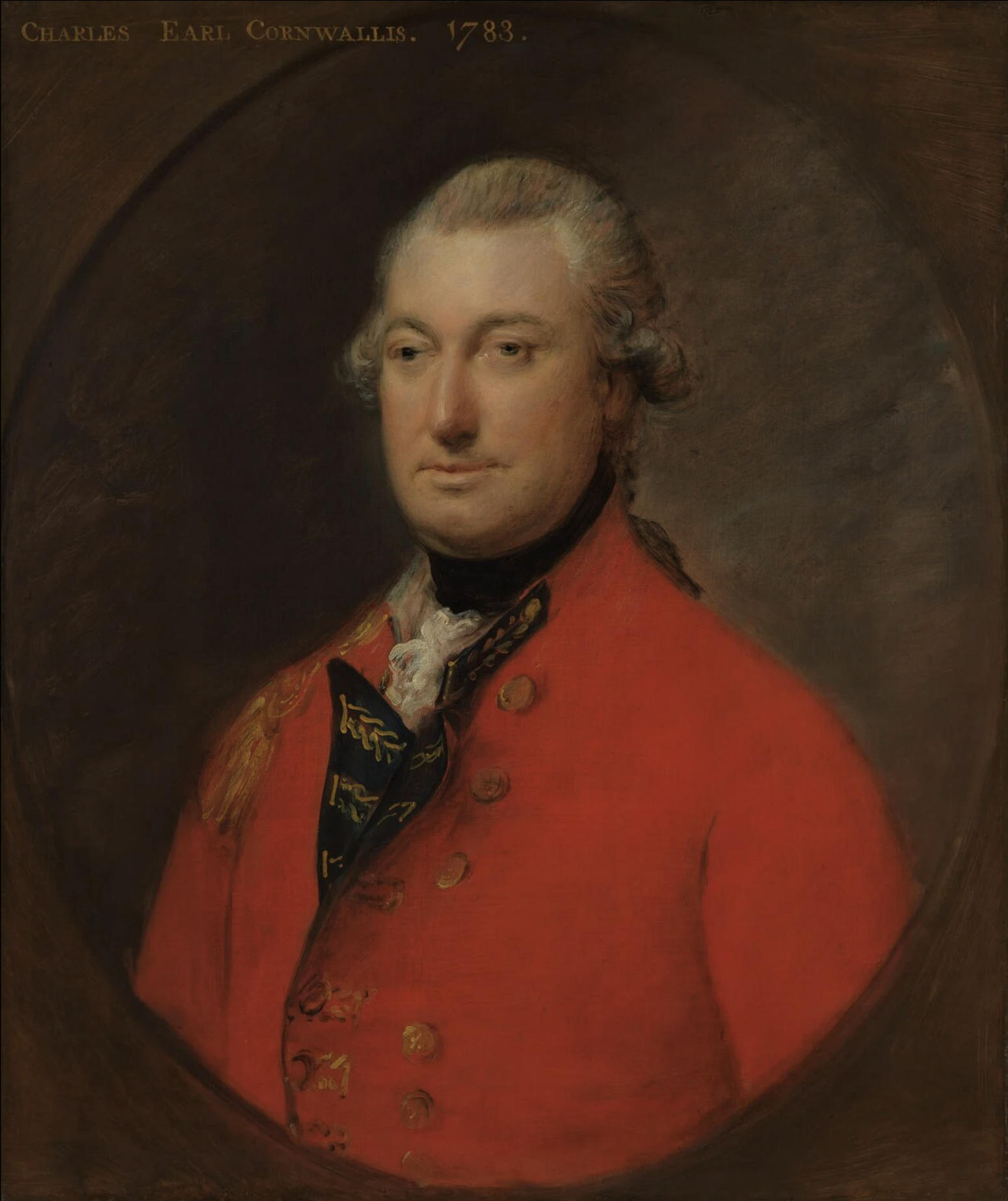
Lord Cornwallis, the Governor-General who established the Permanent Settlement in Bengal

A Kochh Mandai woman of east Bengal (present-day Bangladesh) shown with a broad-bladed agricultural knife and carrying a freshly harvested jackfruit (1860)

Paddy fields in the Madras Presidency, c. 1880. Two-thirds of the presidency fell under the Ryotwari system.

The Company inherited a revenue collection system from the Mughals in which the heaviest proportion of the tax burden fell on the cultivators, with one-third of the production reserved for imperial entitlement; this pre-colonial system became the Company revenue policy's baseline. There was vast variation across India in the methods by which the revenues were collected; with this complication in mind, a Committee of Circuit toured the districts of expanded Bengal presidency in order to make a five-year settlement, consisting of five-yearly inspections and temporary tax farming. In their overall approach to revenue policy, Company officials were guided by two goals: preserving as much as possible the balance of rights and obligations that were traditionally claimed by the farmers who cultivated the land and the various intermediaries who collected tax on the state's behalf and who reserved a cut for themselves and identifying those sectors of the rural economy that would maximize both revenue and security. Although their first revenue settlement turned out to be essentially the same as the more informal previous Mughal one, the Company had created a foundation for the growth of both information and bureaucracy.

In 1793, the new Governor-General, Lord Cornwallis, promulgated the permanent settlement of land revenues in the presidency, the first socio-economic regulation in colonial India. It was named permanent because it fixed the land tax in perpetuity in return for landed property rights for zamindars; it simultaneously defined the nature of land ownership in the presidency and gave individuals and families separate property rights in occupied land. Since the revenue was fixed in perpetuity, it was fixed at a high level, which in Bengal amounted to £3 million at 1789–90 prices. According to one estimate, this was 20% higher than the revenue demand before 1757. Over the next century, partly as a result of land surveys, court rulings and property sales, the change was given practical dimension. An influence on the development of this revenue policy were economic theories which regarded agriculture as the engine of economic development and consequently stressed the fixing of revenue demands in order to encourage growth. The expectation behind the permanent settlement was that knowledge of a fixed government demand would encourage the zamindars to increase both their average outcrop and the land under cultivation, since they would be able to retain the profits from the increased output; in addition, it was envisaged that land would become a marketable form of property that could be purchased, sold or mortgaged. A feature of this economic rationale was the additional expectation that the zamindars, recognizing their own best interest, would not make unreasonable demands on the peasantry.

However, these expectations were not realised in practice and in many regions of Bengal, the peasants bore the brunt of the increased demand, there being little protection for their traditional rights in the new legislation. Forced labor of the peasants by the zamindars became more prevalent as cash crops were cultivated to meet the Company revenue demands. Although commercialized cultivation was not new to the region, it had now penetrated deeper into village society and made it more vulnerable to market forces. The zamindars themselves were often unable to meet the increased demands that the Company had placed on them; consequently, many defaulted, and by one estimate, up to one-third of their lands were auctioned during the first three decades following the permanent settlement. The new owners were often Brahmin and Kayastha employees of the Company who had a good grasp of the new system, and in many cases, had prospered under it.

Since the zamindars were never able to undertake costly improvements to the land envisaged under the Permanent Settlement, some of which required the removal of the existing farmers, they soon became rentiers who lived off the rent from their tenant farmers. In many areas, especially northern Bengal, they had to increasingly share the revenue with intermediate tenure holders, called Jotedar, who supervised farming in the villages. Consequently, unlike the contemporaneous Enclosure movement in Britain, agriculture in Bengal remained the province of the subsistence farming of innumerable small paddy fields.

The zamindari system was one of two principal revenue settlements undertaken by the Company in India. In southern India, Thomas Munro, who would later become Governor of Madras, promoted the ryotwari system, in which the government settled land-revenue directly with the peasant farmers, or ryots. This was, in part, a consequence of the turmoil of the Anglo-Mysore Wars, which had prevented the emergence of a class of large landowners; in addition, Munro and others felt that ryotwari was closer to traditional practice in the region and ideologically more progressive, allowing the benefits of Company rule to reach the lowest levels of rural society. At the heart of the ryotwari system was a particular theory of economic rent—and based on David Ricardo's Law of Rent—promoted by utilitarian James Mill who formulated the Indian revenue policy between 1819 and 1830. "He believed that the government was the ultimate lord of the soil and should not renounce its right to 'rent', i.e. the profit left over on richer soil when wages and other working expenses had been settled." Another keystone of the new system of temporary settlements was the classification of agricultural fields according to soil type and produce, with average rent rates fixed for the period of the settlement. According to Mill, taxation of land rent would promote efficient agriculture and simultaneously prevent the emergence of a "parasitic landlord class." Mill advocated ryotwari settlements which consisted of government measurement and assessment of each plot (valid for 20 or 30 years) and subsequent taxation which was dependent on the fertility of the soil. The taxed amount was nine-tenths of the "rent" in the early 19th century and gradually fell afterwards. However, in spite of the appeal of the ryotwari system's abstract principles, class hierarchies in southern Indian villages had not entirely disappeared—for example village headmen continued to hold sway—and peasant cultivators sometimes came to experience revenue demands they could not meet. In the 1850s, a scandal erupted when it was discovered that some Indian revenue agents of the Company were using torture to meet the Company's revenue demands.

Land revenue settlements constituted a major administrative activity of the various governments in India under Company rule. In all areas other than the Bengal Presidency, land settlement work involved a continually repetitive process of surveying and measuring plots, assessing their quality, and recording landed rights, and constituted a large proportion of the work of Indian Civil Service officers working for the government. After the Company lost its trading rights, it became the single most important source of government revenue, roughly half of overall revenue in the middle of the 19th century; even so, between the years 1814 and 1859, the government of India ran debts in 33 years. With expanded dominion, even during non-deficit years, there was just enough money to pay the salaries of a threadbare administration, a skeleton police force, and the army.

== Trade ==
"It was stated in evidence (in 1813) that the cotton and silk goods of India, up to this period, could be sold for a profit in the British market at a price from 50 to 60 per cent. lower than those fabricated in England. It consequently became necessary to protect the latter by duties of 70 or 80 per cent. on their value, or by positive prohibition. Had this not been the case, had not such prohibitory duties and decrees existed, the mills of Paisley and of Manchester would have been stopped in their outset, and could hardly have been again set in motion, even by the powers of steam. They were created by the sacrifice of the Indian manufactures. Had India been independent, she would have retaliated; would have imposed preventive duties upon British goods, and would thus have preserved her own productive industry from annihilation. This act of self-defence was not permitted her; she was at the mercy of the stranger. British goods were forced upon her without paying any duty; and the foreign manufacturer employed the arm of political injustice to keep down and ultimately strangle a competitor with whom he could not contend on equal terms."

— H.H. Wilson footnote in The History of British India by James Mill

From the first voyages of the Company in the early 1600s it had traditionally imported bullion to both hire local Indian employees, across its network of factories, and for the purchase of Indian trade goods, either to be bartered on for Slaves, or sold in the European and American colonies. Prasannan Parthasarathi estimates that 28,000 tonnes of bullion (mainly from the New World) flowed into the Indian subcontinent between 1600 and 1800, equating to 30% of the world's production in the period. Studies have also shown approximately 5% of these voyages failed, Company records showing of the 2,171 voyages, between the mid 18th century, and 1813, 105 were lost to enemy action, foundering, or wrecking, resulting in the loss of treasure and goods.

Export of Bullion to India, by EIC (1708–1810)
Years	Bullion (£)	Average per Annum
1708/9-1733/4	12,189,147	420,315
1734/5-1759/60	15,239,115	586,119
1760/1-1765/6	842,381	140,396
1766/7-1771/2	968,289	161,381
1772/3-1775/6	72,911	18,227
1776/7-1784/5	156,106	17,345
1785/6-1792/3	4,476,207	559,525
1793/4-1809/10	8,988,165	528,715

After gaining the right to collect revenue in Bengal in 1765, the East India Company temporarily decreased the volume of gold and silver it was importing annually into India.

In addition, as under Mughal rule, land revenue collected in the Bengal Presidency helped finance the Company's wars in other parts of India. Consequently, in the period 1760–1800, Bengal's money supply was greatly diminished; furthermore, the closing of some local mints and close supervision of the rest, the fixing of exchange rates, and the standardization of coinage, paradoxically, added to the economic downturn. During the period, 1780–1860, India changed from being an exporter of processed goods for which it received payment in bullion, to being an exporter of raw materials and a buyer of manufactured goods. More specifically, in the 1750s, mostly fine cotton and silk was exported from India to markets in Europe, Asia, and Africa; by the second quarter of the 19th century, raw materials, which chiefly consisted of raw cotton, opium, and indigo, accounted for most of India's exports. Also, from the late 18th century British cotton mill industry began to lobby the government to both tax Indian imports and allow them access to markets in India. Starting in the 1830s, British textiles began to appear in—and soon to inundate—the Indian markets, with the value of the textile imports growing from £5.2 million in 1850 to £18.4 million in 1896. The American Civil War too would have a major impact on India's cotton economy: with the outbreak of the war, American cotton was no longer available to British manufacturers; consequently, demand for Indian cotton soared, and the prices soon quadrupled. This led many farmers in India to switch to cultivating cotton as a quick cash crop; however, with the end of the war in 1865, the demand plummeted again, creating another downturn in the agricultural economy.

At this time, the East India Company's trade with China began to grow as well. In the early 19th century demand for Chinese tea had greatly increased in Britain; since the money supply in India was restricted and the Company was indisposed to shipping bullion from Britain, it decided upon opium, which had a large underground market in China and which was grown in many parts of India, as the most profitable form of payment. However, since the Chinese authorities had banned the importation and consumption of opium, the Company engaged them in the First Opium War, and at its conclusion, under the Treaty of Nanjing, gained access to five Chinese ports, Guangzhou, Xiamen, Fuzhou, Shanghai, and Ningbo; in addition, Hong Kong was ceded to the British Crown. Towards the end of the second quarter of the 19th century, opium export constituted 40% of India's exports.

Photograph of East India Company factory in Painam, Sonargaon, Bangladesh, a major producer of the celebrated Dhaka muslins

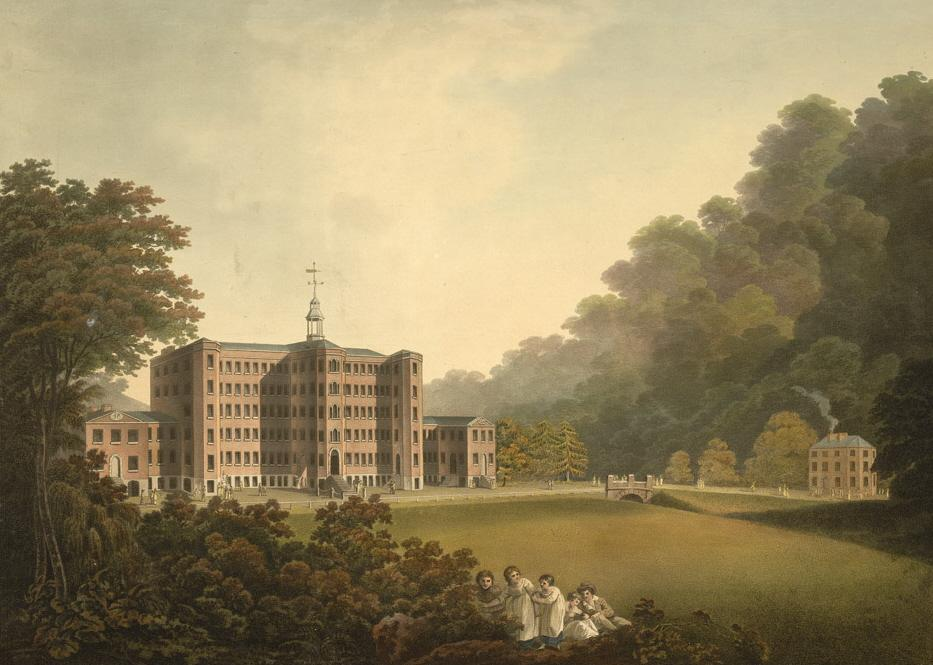
"Mellor Mill" in Marple, Greater Manchester, England, was constructed in 1790–93 for manufacturing muslin cloth.

Opium Godown (Storehouse) in Patna, Bihar (c. 1814). Patna was the centre of the Company opium industry.

Indigo dye factory in Bengal. Bengal was the world's largest producer of natural indigo in the 19th century.

Another major, though erratic, export item was indigo dye, which was extracted from natural indigo, and which came to be grown in Bengal and northern Bihar. In 1788, the East India Company offered advances to ten British planters to grow indigo; however, since the new (landed) property rights defined in the Permanent Settlement, didn't allow them, as Europeans, to buy agricultural land, they had to in turn offer cash advances to local peasants, and sometimes coerce them, to grow the crop. In early 19th century Europe, blue apparel was favoured as a fashion, particularly amongst African Slavers, North American Colonists, and for some military uniforms; consequently, the demand for the dye was high. The European demand for the dye, however, proved to be unstable, and both creditors and cultivators bore the risk of the market crashes in 1827 and 1847. The peasant discontent in Bengal eventually led to the Indigo rebellion in 1859–60 and to the end of indigo production there. In Bihar, however, indigo production continued well into the 20th century; a centre of indigo production there, Champaran district, became an early testing ground, in 1917, for Mohandas Karamchand Gandhi's strategy of non-violent resistance against the British Raj.

== See also ==
- GDP of India (1–1947 CE)
- Economy of India under the British Raj
- Exploitation colonialism
- Economy of the Mughal Empire
- Muslin trade in Bengal
