= Battle of Ghaghra =

1529 battle between Mughals and allied Sultanates

- Part of Mughal conquests
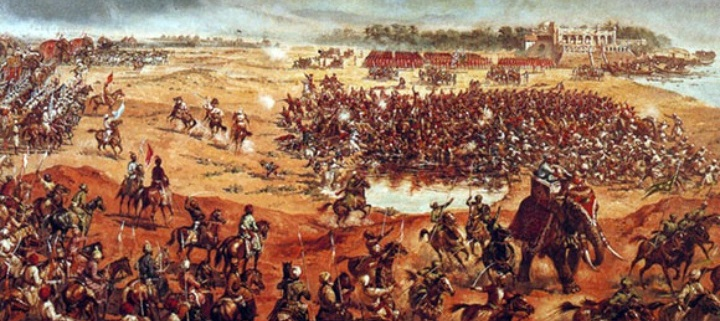
Date	6 May 1529
Location	Ghaghara River, Revelganj (present-day Bihar, India) 25.8°N 84.8°E
Result	Mughal victory

Belligerents
Mughal Empire	Eastern Afghan confederacy: (Delhi Sultanate) Lodi dynasty; Lohani dynasty; Sultanate of Bengal

Commanders and leaders
Babur; Humayun; Bairam Khan; Askari Mirza; Muhammad Zaman Mirza; Sultan Jalal ud-Din Sherki; Sultan Junaid Barlas; Ustad Ali Quli; Mustafa Rumi; Sher Shah Suri	Sultan Nusrat Shah (Delhi Sultanate) Sultan Mahmud Lodi; Sultan Jalal ud-Din Lohani †; Bayezid; Biban; Fateh Khan Shirwani †; Shah Muhammad Maaruf †; Bhaktuddin Aibek (POW); Hakam Khan (POW)

Casualties and losses
Unknown	Entire army
- Location within South Asia Battle of Ghaghra (Bihar)

The Battle of Ghaghra, fought in 1529, was a major battle for the conquest of India by the Mughal Empire. It followed the first Battle of Panipat in 1526 and the Battle of Khanwa in 1527. The forces of Mughal Emperor Babur of the emerging Mughal Empire were joined by Indian allies in battle against the Eastern Afghan Confederates under Sultan Mahmud Lodi and the Sultanate of Bengal under Sultan Nusrat Shah.

== Background ==
Sultan Mahmud Lodi, who aspired to the throne of Delhi and who had been declared the rightful heir to the Delhi Sultanate by the Western Afghan Confederates and aided by the Rajput Confederates, was put to flight after the defeat at the Battle of Khanwa in 1527. He took refuge in Gujarat. After trying to get in touch with his kinsmen in the east he managed to join them. He at the head of the Eastern Afghan Confederates took Bihar. When Sultan Muhammad Shah Lohani, the Pathan king of Bihar of the new dynasty, died, sometime after Babur's expedition to Chanderi, he was succeeded by his son Sultan Jalal ud-Din Lohani, a minor, and the chief management of affairs at least in Bihar then devolved on that prince's mother Dudu and on Farid Khan, better known as Sher Shah Suri, who had already risen into distinction; that the country was distracted by the rival claims of the Lohani nobles related to the young king, of Baban and Bayezid whose influence was very extensive, of Sher Shah Suri and of other chiefs, and that these factions added to the effects of the discomfiture which the Pathans received in the preceding campaigns from the armies of Babur at length induced the young prince to take refuge in the territories of the Sultan of Bengal.

In this state of things the Afghans of Jaunpur and indeed of India in general, in order to avert the total ruin of their affairs and to unite all interests as far as was practicable, resolved to call in Sultan Mahmud Lodi who had already, with the support of Rana Sanga, made an effort to mount the throne of Delhi. When defeated in that attempt he had retired to Gujarat. Afterwards, he proceeded to Panna in Bundelkhand where he remained waiting for some favorable change of affairs and now accepted the invitation to ascend the throne of Bihar and Jaunpur. He was speedily joined by his countrymen from every quarter and seems to have taken possession of nearly the whole of Bihar without opposition. What excites most surprise is the secrecy and success with which intrigues and movements so extensive appear to have been conducted, a fact explained perhaps by the deep interest which every Pathan felt in the national success and the fidelity which tribesmen show to their chiefs and to each other.

The day after receiving this news, Babur returned to Agra, where he told his council he would immediately assume command of the eastern army. Taking with him such troops as were at hand, he set out on 2 February 1529, and crossing the Doab, reached the right bank of the Ganges at Dakdaki on 27 February 1529. Here he was met by his son Humayun, General Askari, and several generals who came from the other side. He arranged with them that while his army marched down the right bank of the river theirs should march down the left and should always encamp over against his.

The information which he received here was but little satisfactory. He found that the Pathans who were straining every nerve to recover their military and political ascendancy had gathered around Sultan Mahmud Lodi to the number of 100,000 men. The Sultan had detached Baban and Sheikh Bayezid with a large force to Sirwar while he himself with Fateh Khan Shirwani, the minister of Sultan Jalal ud-Din Lodi and Sultan Ibrahim Lodi in succession by whom Mahmud had been joined and who had now deserted Babur as he had done his first master, kept along the Bihar bank of the Ganges and was marching on Chunar. Sher Shah Suri, whom Babur had distinguished by marks of his favor having given him several Parganas and entrusted him with a command, had joined the insurgents, had crossed the Ganges, and occupied Benares from which the officers of Sultan Jalal ud-Din Sherki, a descendant of the older dynasty of the country who held the city under Babur's authority had fled on his approach.

There were therefore at this time three competitors for the Eastern or Sherki kingdom

- Sultan Jalal ud-Din Sherki, was the representative of the older kings who ruled the country before it was conquered by Sultan Sikander Lodi. He had lately submitted to Babur and sought his protection. His claims had become rather obsolete but seemed to have been revived at this period, and acknowledged by Babur, evidently to serve an immediate purpose.
- Sultan Jalal ud-Din Khan Lohani, whose father and grandfather had headed the revolt against Sultan Ibrahim Lodi. He was supported by many Afghan nobles in Bihar but had lately been forced to seek refuge with the Sultan of Bengal, his ally.
- Sultan Mahmud Lodi, the brother of the late Sultan Ibrahim Lodi and the representative of the Lodi dynasty of Delhi whom the great body of the Pathans had now united to support in his claims not on Bihar merely, but on Delhi itself.

Babur informed of the real state of affairs continued his march down the banks of the Ganges. In passing Karra, he was magnificently entertained by Sultan Jalal ud-Din Sherki, the prince whose pretensions he favored and on whom he bestowed the nominal command of a division of his army. When he had made a march or two below that city the effects of his activity became visible. He learned that Sultan Mahmud Lodi, who had recently advanced to Chunar and even made an assault upon it, had no sooner received certain information of the Emperor's approach than filled with consternation he raised the siege and retreated in confusion and that Sher Shah Suri had in like manner abandoned Benares and recrossed the river with such precipitation that two of his boats were lost in the passage.

The imperial army having reached Allahabad where the Ganges and Yamuna rivers unite their streams, began on 10 March 1529, to cross the latter river to Priag whence Babur proceeded by Chunar, Benares and Ghazipur hastening to attack Sultan Mahmud who had now taken a position behind the Son River. At Ghazipur, Mahmud Khan Lohani, an Afghan of influence, came and submitted to him and while yet near the same place Sultan Jalal ud-Din Khan Lohani the expelled prince and still one of the competitors for the throne of Bihar, Farid Khan [Sher Shah Suri] the future sovereign of Delhi and other Afghans of influence sent to tender their submission. This amounted to a breaking up of the Lohani dynasty of Bihar leaving only Sultan Mahmud Lodi and his adherents to be combated.

Babur now proceeded to cross the Kermnas and encamped beyond Chousa (that was to become celebrated by the calamity of his son) and Baksara or Buxar. Marching thence he found that Sultan Mahmud whose army had been daily suffering from defection and who had been lying not far off attended by only 2,000 men had retired with precipitation on the approach of an advanced party of the imperial army had been pursued and several of his men slain. He also now took refuge with the army of Bengal which had crossed the Ganges probably with the intention of cooperating with him. Babur proceeded to the district of Ari in Bihar lying between the Ganges and the Son River at their confluence where he invested Muhammad Zaman Mirza with the government of Bihar and fixed the revenue to be paid out of that province. The Emperor had now arrived opposite to where the Ghaghara River (also called Gogra in some texts) joins the Ganges from the north east and where apparently the kingdom of Bengal commenced on the left bank of that river. Here he learned that Sultan Mahmud Lodi was in the Bengal camp at the junction of the two rivers with a body of Afghans and that when he and his followers wished to remove their families and baggage they were not permitted by the Bengalis probably wishing to retain them as hostages Sultan Jalal ud-Din Khan Lohani his rival who had lately sent his submission to Babur was in like manner hindered from departing in consequence of which he had come to blows with the Bengalis had effected a passage over the Ganges into Bihar with his followers and was on his march to join the imperial army. The Emperor therefore who considered that the position of the army of Bengal and the conduct of its leaders had violated their neutrality prepared to call them to account. Nusrat Shah, the Sultan of Bengal had recovered some of his lost territories from the Pathans after the collapse of the Delhi Sultanate.

== Battle ==
Near the end of April, Babur found the Bengal army was called, lying between what is at present the territory of Saran in the north. It was encamped near the junction of the Ganges and the Ghaghara River so as to be able to defend both the course of the Ghaghara River and the left bank of the Ganges after the union of the two rivers. He discovered that the Bengali generals had collected about 100–150 vessels on their side of the river using which they were able at once to hinder the passage of an enemy and to facilitate their own. Such an army he could not safely leave behind especially as the troops of Baban and Bayezid had also taken refuge upon and in strength occupied the upper course of the Ghaghra River. He was at peace with Bengal but the shelter afforded to his fleeing enemy, the position of the Bengal army and the equivocal conduct of its leaders made it indispensable that he should have a categorical declaration as to the disposition and intention of the Bengali government. He, therefore, dispatched an envoy to Nusrat Shah, the Sultan of Bengal.

Babur was joined by Sultan Junaid Barlas from Jaunpur with about 20,000 men on the 28th. The tardy arrival of these troops subjected their commander to a temporary disgrace. Not having received a satisfactory answer to his demands, the Emperor resolved to compel the army beyond the Ghaghra River to quit its strong position. He made the necessary arrangements for the intended attack. He formed his army into six divisions. Four of these consisting of Askari's army which was already on the eastern bank of the Ganges and of Sultan Junaid's which had recently joined on the same side were ordered to be prepared to cross the Ghaghra River either in boats at Haldi or by fording still farther up that river. Askari was the youngest son of Babur. The other two divisions were still on the western bank of the Ganges. One of these under the Emperor's direction was to effect the passage of that river and then to cover the operations of the Turkish Ustad Ali Quli, his chief engineer and commander of the artillery, who was directed to plant a battery on the banks of the Siru or Ghaghra River above its union with the Ganges directly opposite to the Bengali camp, which it would be able to cannonade and afterward to cover the passage of the Emperor's division when it crossed the Ghaghra River to attack the enemy. Mustafa Rumi another Turkish engineer who had a party of musketeers and artillery supported by Muhammad Zaman Mirza and the sixth division was to open a cannonade on the flank of the enemy's camp from the Bihar bank of the Ganges below the junction of the rivers. The main body of the army which was under Askari after passing the Ghaghra River at Haldi was ordered to march down upon the enemy to draw them from their camp and induce them to march up that river and by this diversion to keep them occupied until the two divisions of Babur and Muhammad Zaman under cover of the fire of the artillery and matchlock men could be transported across.

The whole army was accordingly put in motion Askari's four divisions marched for Haldi. The batteries both on the Ghaghara River and Ganges were constructed and commenced their fire. The Bengali army behaved with great bravery and pushed parties across to attack the Emperor's troops both above and below the junction of the rivers. At length, after various movements, Babur received notice that Askari had effected a passage over the Ghaghra River at the Haldi Ghat and was now ready for action and that he had been strengthened by the defection of Shah Muhammad Maaruf an Afghan nobleman of the highest rank and consequence who had deserted the confederacy with his followers and now joined his camp. The general attack was therefore fixed for the next morning but in the meantime, there was some fighting between the vessels in the river.

On the morning of 6 May, 1529, as soon as Askari's army was known to be in motion the Bengali troops moved up to meet him whereupon Babur ordered both his division and that of Muhammad Zaman to cross over without delay. This was affected bravely though not without sharp resistance. The troops got across some in boats, some by swimming, some floating on reeds. They were met with equal gallantry on landing but kept together formed and made repeated vigorous charges. As Askari advanced north-west towards the enemy, the Bengali army finding themselves surrounded and driven in on three sides finally quit the field in confusion.

== Aftermath ==
This victory was decisive in its consequences. Numbers of the Afghans who till now had been refractory having lost all hope of re-establishing an Afghan government in the East submitted and Sultan Jalal ud-Din Khan Lohani the late King of Bihar whose escape from the Bengali camp has been mentioned arrived with many of his principal Amirs and acknowledged Babur. Other chiefs imitating their example petitioned to be received into the Emperor's service. 7,000-8,000 Lohani Afghans had already joined him and were now rewarded and employed. The feuds between the Lohani and Lodi factions in the Eastern provinces were fatal to the Pathan national interest. As for the Sultan of Bengal Nusrat Shah, he hastily accepted peace proposals, previously communicated to him via the envoy Babur had sent before the battle.

This would be Babur's last major engagement. He continued to consolidate his power and establish administrative infrastructure in his new Empire distributing jagirs (Estates) to loyal nobles and allies. He died at the age of 47 on 26 December, 1530, of an unknown illness and was succeeded by his eldest son, Humayun.

== See also ==
- First Battle of Panipat
- Battle of Khanwa
