= Bedekar =

Bedekar is a surname. Notable people with the surname include:

- Malati Bedekar (1905–2001), Indian author
- Ninad Bedekar (1949–2015), Indian historian, writer, and orator
- Vishram Bedekar (1906–1998), Indian movie director
