= Mughal artillery =

Artillery used by the Mughal empire

Mughal artillery included a variety of cannons, rockets, and mines employed by the Mughal Empire. This gunpowder technology played an important role in the formation and expansion of the empire. In the opening lines of Abul Fazl's famous text Ain-i-Akbari, he claims that "except for the Mediterranean/Ottoman territories (Rumistan), in no other place was gunpowder artillery available in such abundance as in the Mughal Empire." Thereby subtly referring to the superiority of the empire's artillery over the Safavids and Shaibanids. During the reign of the first three Timurid rulers of India—Babur, Humayun, and Akbar—gunpowder artillery had "emerged as an important equipage of war, contributing significantly to the establishment of a highly centralized state structure under Akbar and to the consolidation of Mughal rule in conquered territories."

== History ==
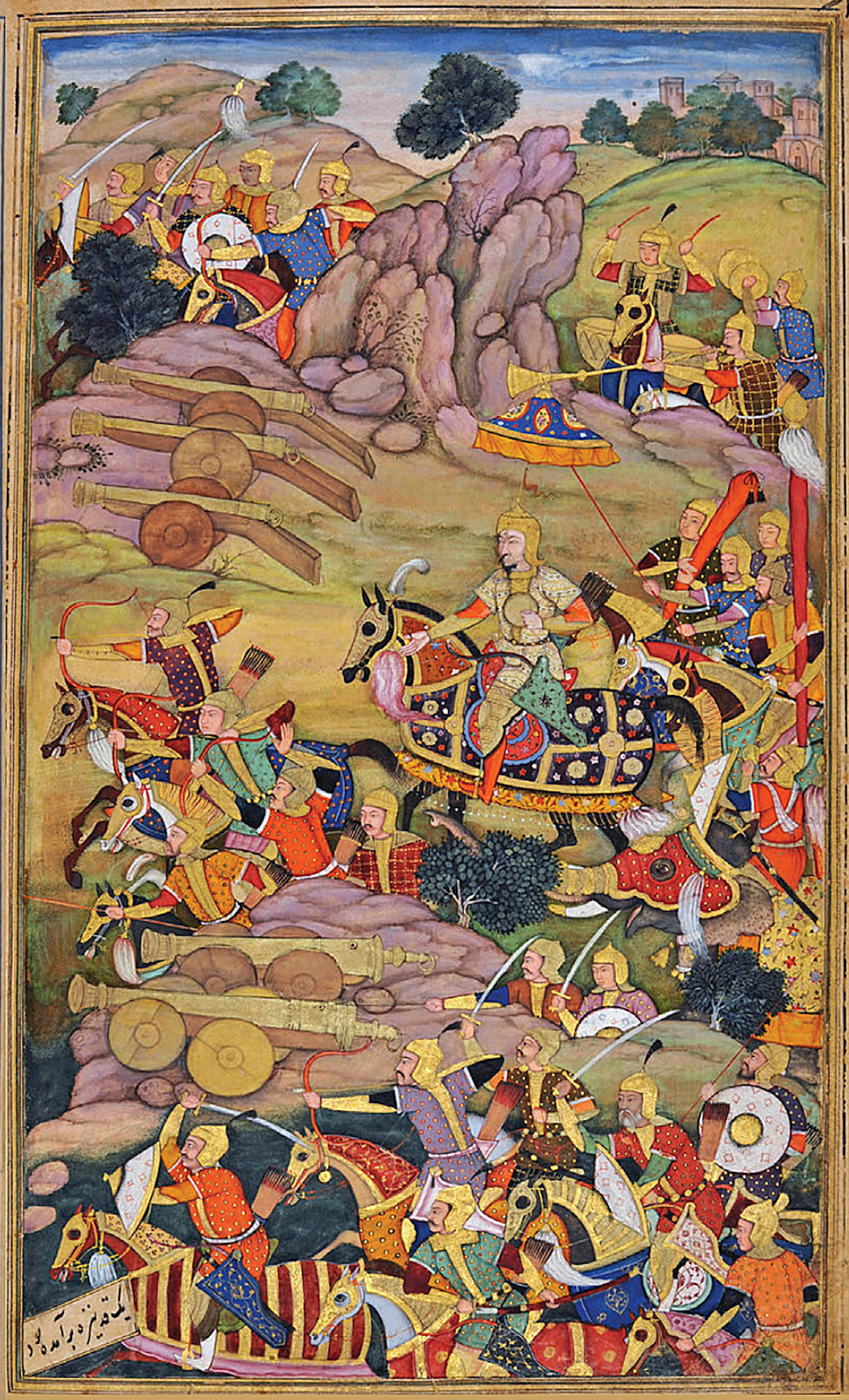
Battle of Panipat

Artillery was not widely employed in Central Asia prior to the 16th century, despite Chinese mortars having been known to the Mongols hundreds of years earlier. Even some use of cannon at Hisar by the Timurid Sultan Husayn Mirza in 1496 did not lead to a substantial military role for artillery in India, nor did the presence of Portuguese ship's cannon at the 1509 Battle of Diu. However, following the decisive Ottoman victory over the Safavid Empire at the 1514 Battle of Chaldiran, Babur incorporated artillery and Ottoman artillery tactics into his military. Although authorities disagree about how many cannons he brought to India, Babur's artillery played a "key role" in the establishment of the Mughal Empire. In 1526, the First Battle of Panipat saw the introduction of massed artillery tactics to Indian warfare. Under the guidance of Ottoman gun master Ustad Ali Quli, Babur deployed cannons behind a screening row of carts. Enemy commander Ibrahim Lodi was provoked into a frontal attack against Babur's position, allowing him to make ideal use of his firepower. This tactic also panicked Lodi's elephant cavalry, beginning the end of elephant warfare as a dominant offensive strategy in India. These new weapons and tactics were even more important against the more formidable army faced in the Battle of Khanwa the following year.

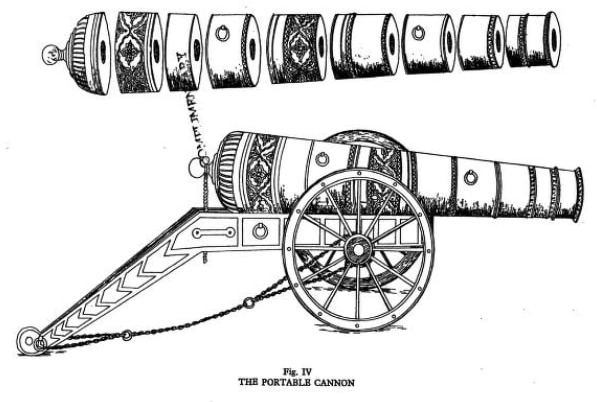
Portable Cannon

Artillery remained an important part of the Mughal military, in both field deployment and incorporation into defensive forts. However, transportation of the extremely heavy guns remained problematic, even as weapon technology improved during the reign of Akbar. In 1582, Fathullah Shirazi, a Persian-Indian Mughal officer, developed a seventeen-barrelled cannon, fired with a matchlock. Shirazi also invented an anti-infantry volley gun with multiple gun barrels similar to a hand cannon.

Later emperors paid less attention to the technical aspects of artillery, allowing the Mughal Empire to gradually fall behind in weapon technology, although the degree to which this decline affected military operations is debated. Under Aurangzeb, the Mughal technology remained superior to that of the breakaway Maratha Empire, but traditional Mughal artillery tactics were difficult to employ against Maratha guerrilla raids. In 1652 and 1653, during the Mughal–Safavid War, prince Dara Shikoh was able to move light artillery through the Bolan Pass to assist in the siege of Qandahar. But problems with the accuracy and reliability of the weapons, as well as the inherent defensive strengths of the fort, failed to produce a victory. By the 18th century, the obsolete bronze guns of the declining empire were unable to compete with newer cast-iron weapons, and performed poorly against forces that employed them, such as Jean Law de Lauriston's French troops.

== Weaponry ==
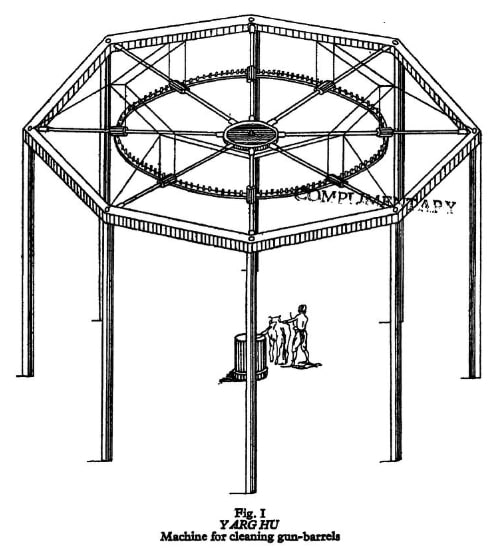
"Yarghu": machine for cleaning gun barrels

Archaeological research has recovered guns made of bronze from Kozhikode, dating from 1504, and Diu, India which dates from 1533.

Mughal cannon making skills advanced during the 17th century. One of the most impressive Mughal cannons is known as the Zafarbaksh, which is a very rare composite cannon, the production of which required skills in both wrought-iron forge welding and bronze-casting technologies as well as in-depth knowledge of the qualities of both metals. Some devices to support the maintenance of these cannons also developed, such as a machine invented by the Mughal officer Fathullah Shirazi known as the "Yarghu" which could clean sixteen gun barrels simultaneously and was operated by a cow. Shirazi also developed an early multi-gun shot. Similar to the polybolos and repeating crossbows which were used in ancient Greece and China respectively, Shirazi's rapid-firing hand cannon had multiple gun barrels that fired gunpowder, akin to a volley gun.

The Ibrahim Rauza was a famed cannon which was well known for its multiple barrels. François Bernier, the personal physician to Aurangzeb, observed Mughal gun-carriages each drawn by two horses, an improvement over the bullock-drawn gun-carriages used elsewhere in India.

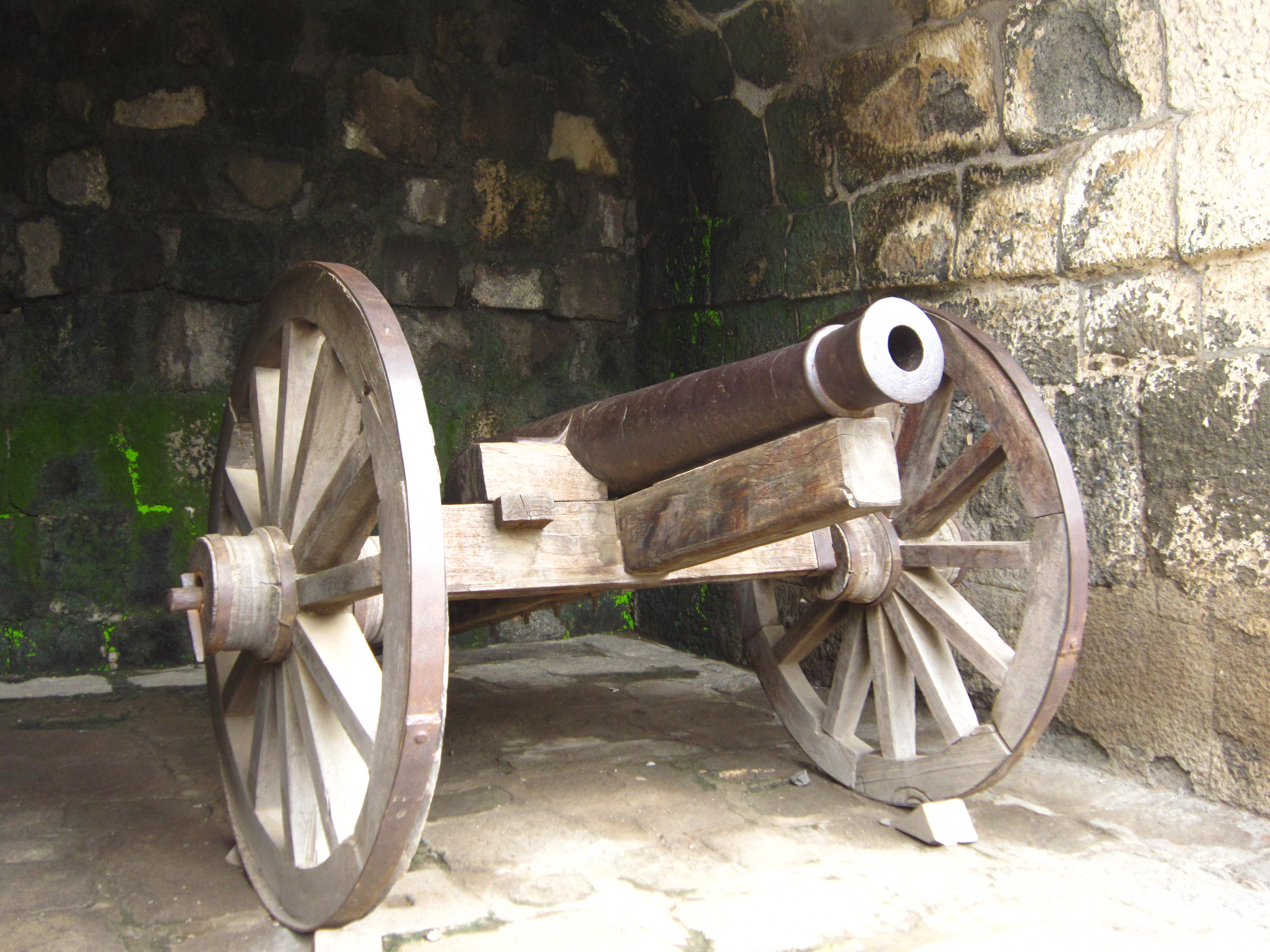
Daulatabad cannon

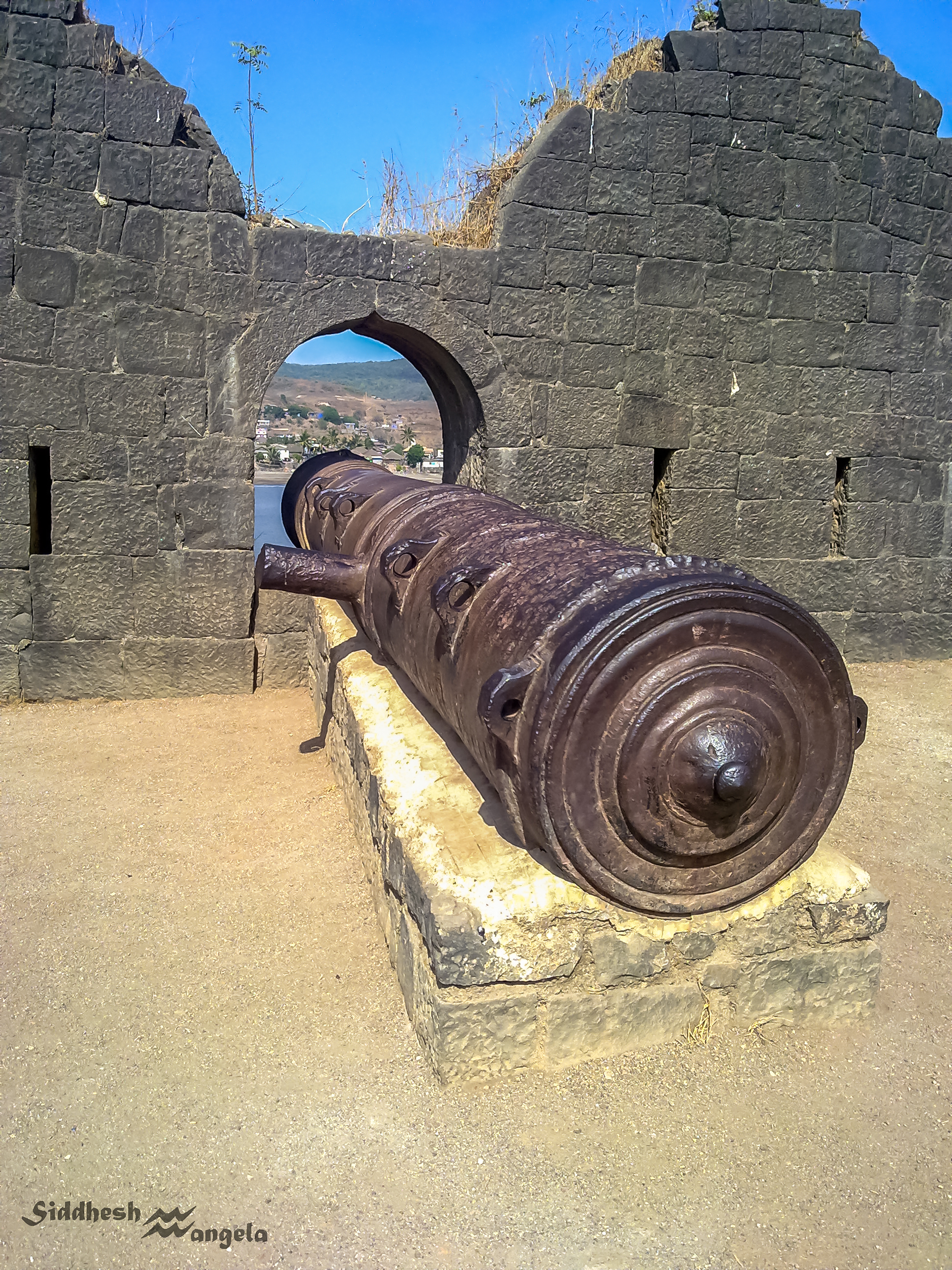
Kalak Bangadi cannon.

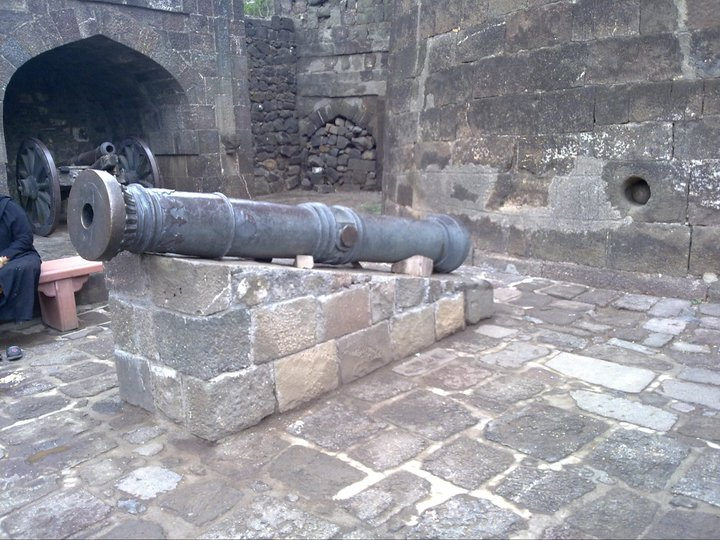
One of the Daulatabad cannons

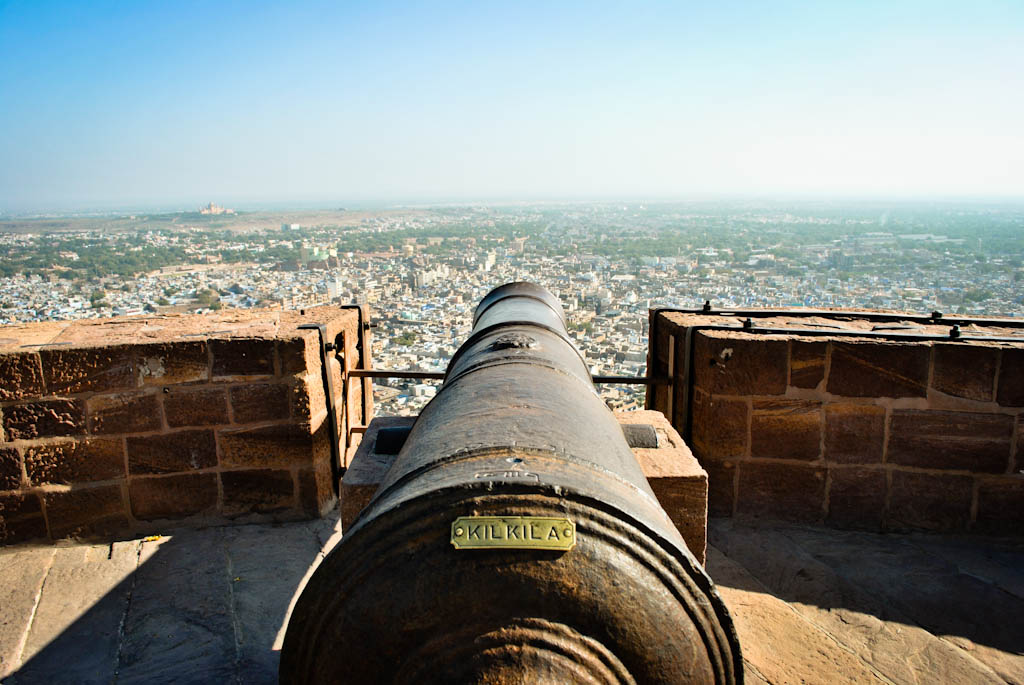
Kilkila cannon

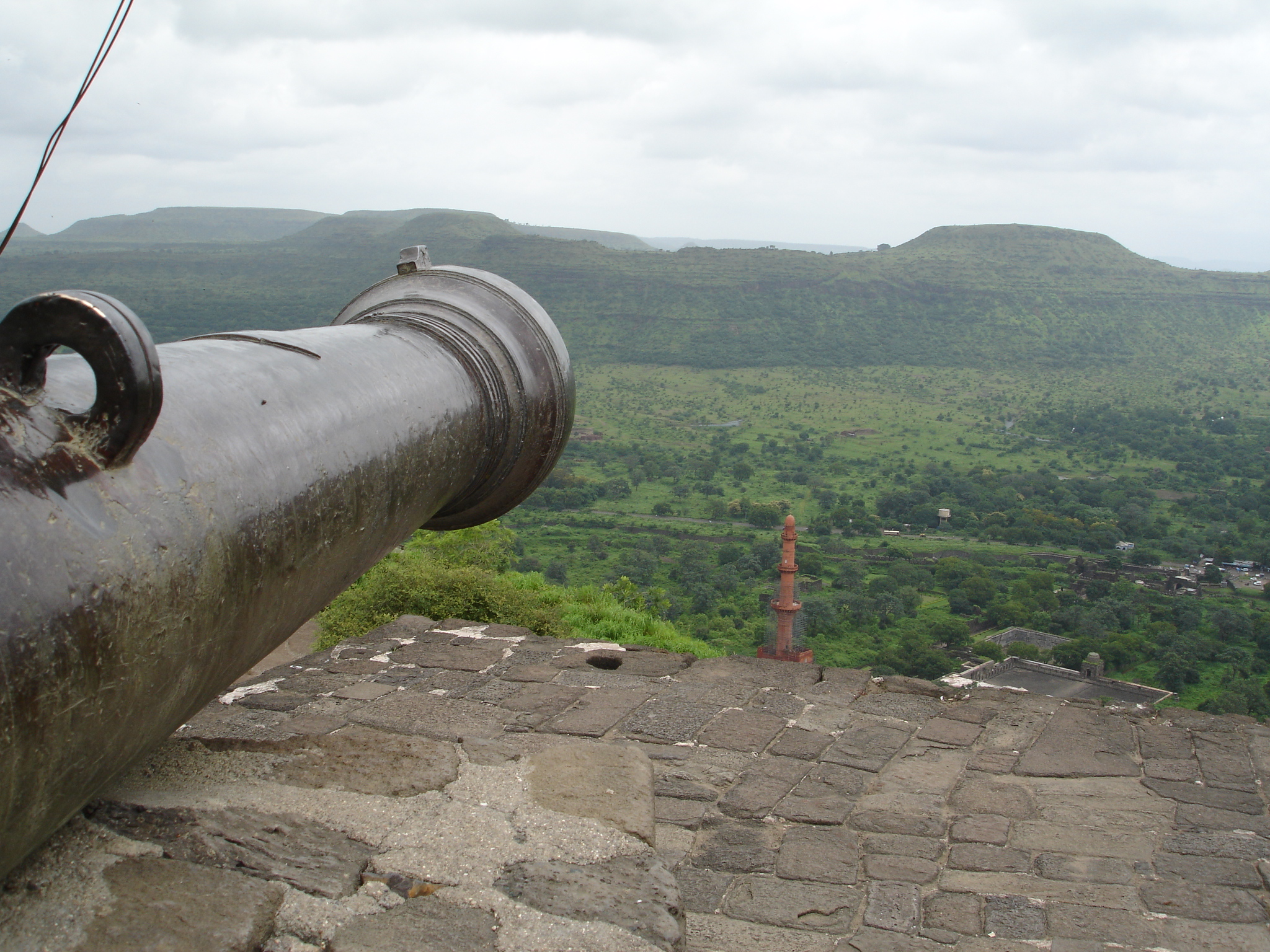
Aurangabad cannon

The Mughal military employed a broad array of gunpowder weapons larger than personal firearms, from rockets and mobile guns to an enormous cannon, over 4.3 m (14 ft), once described as the "largest piece of ordnance in the world." This array of weapons was divided into heavy and light artillery. According to historian Irfan Habib, one cannot "estimate the amount of metal used in the artillery of the Mughal army, or the amount of gunpowder it consumed, but in view of the numbers employed in the artillery (over 40,000 men), it is certain that at any time some tens of thousands of matchlocks (surely not less than 25,000, on these numbers) must have been in use; and we know that excessively heavy cannon were much favored in India."

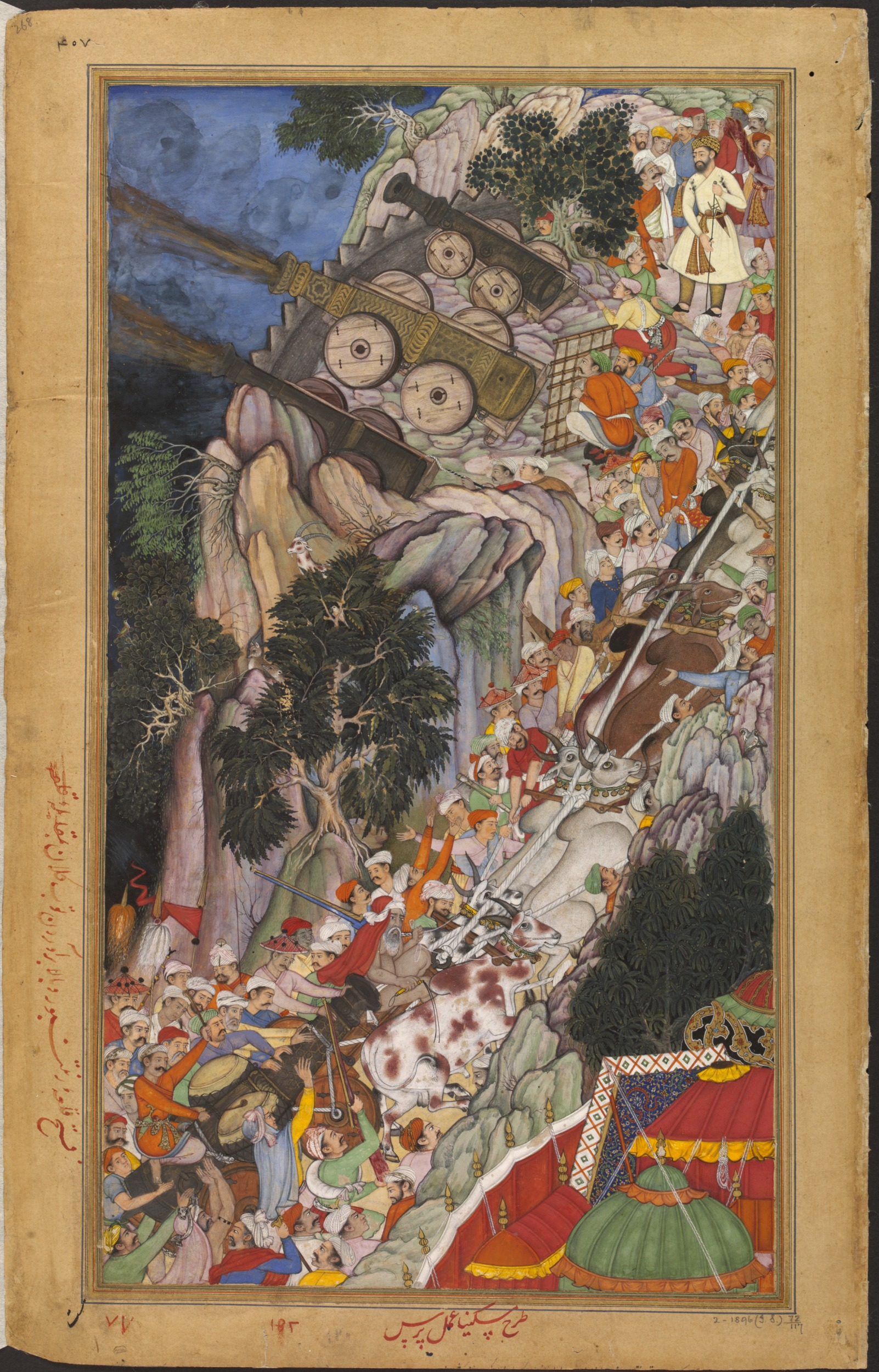
Bullocks dragging siege-guns up hill during Akbar's attack on Ranthambhor Fort

=== Heavy artillery ===
Extremely heavy artillery was an important part of the Mughal military, especially under its early emperors.

Emperor Babur reportedly deployed guns capable of firing cannonballs weighing between 102 and 143 kg (225 and 315 lb) during a 1527 siege, and had previously employed a cannon capable of firing a 240 kg (540 lb) stone ball. Humayun did not field such massive artillery at the Battle of Kannauj in 1540, but still had heavy cannons capable of firing 46 pound lead balls at a distance of one farsakh. These large weapons were often given heroic names, such as Tiger Mouth (Sher Dahan), Lord Champion (Ghazi Khan), or Conqueror of the Army (Fath-i-Lashkar), and inscriptions, sometimes in verse. They were not only considered weapons, but real works of art.

These heavy artillery pieces were not easy to move. Rugged passes and water crossings were insurmountable barriers, and even when they could be moved, it was a slow process requiring sixteen or twenty oxen for relatively moderate cannons such as Humayun's. Muhammad Azam Shah was forced to abandon his heavy artillery en route to the Battle of Jajau. The largest such weapons, such as Muhammad Shah's "Fort Opener", required a team of "four elephants and thousands of oxen" and only rarely reached their siege targets.

Other heavy artillery used by the Mughals were Wökhul (mortars). The largest recorded Mughal mortar was designed by Shirazi, which when used during the Siege of Chittorgarh were capable firing a cannonball as heavy as 1,400 kg (3,000 lb). Mines were also deployed by sappers against fortress walls. Although these weapons had noticeable successes, such as the victory at the Siege of Chittorgarh in 1567, their preparation and deployment came at the cost of substantial Mughal losses. Another recorded usage of mortars also occurred in 1659 during the conflict between Aurangzeb against his brother, Shah Shuja.

The Mughals artillery corps employed hand grenades and rocket artillery. Under Akbar's reign, Mughal rockets began to use metal casing, which made them more weatherproof and allowed a larger amount of gunpowder, increasing their destructive power. Mughal ban iron rockets were described by European visitors, including François Bernier who witnessed the 1658 Battle of Samugarh fought between brothers Aurangzeb and Dara Shikoh. Mughal rockets are considered a predecessor to the Mysorean rockets later employed by Hyder Ali and Tipu Sultan in the 18th century.

By the 17th century, Indians were manufacturing a diverse variety of firearms; large guns in particular became visible in Tanjore, Dacca, Bijapur and Murshidabad.

=== Light artillery ===
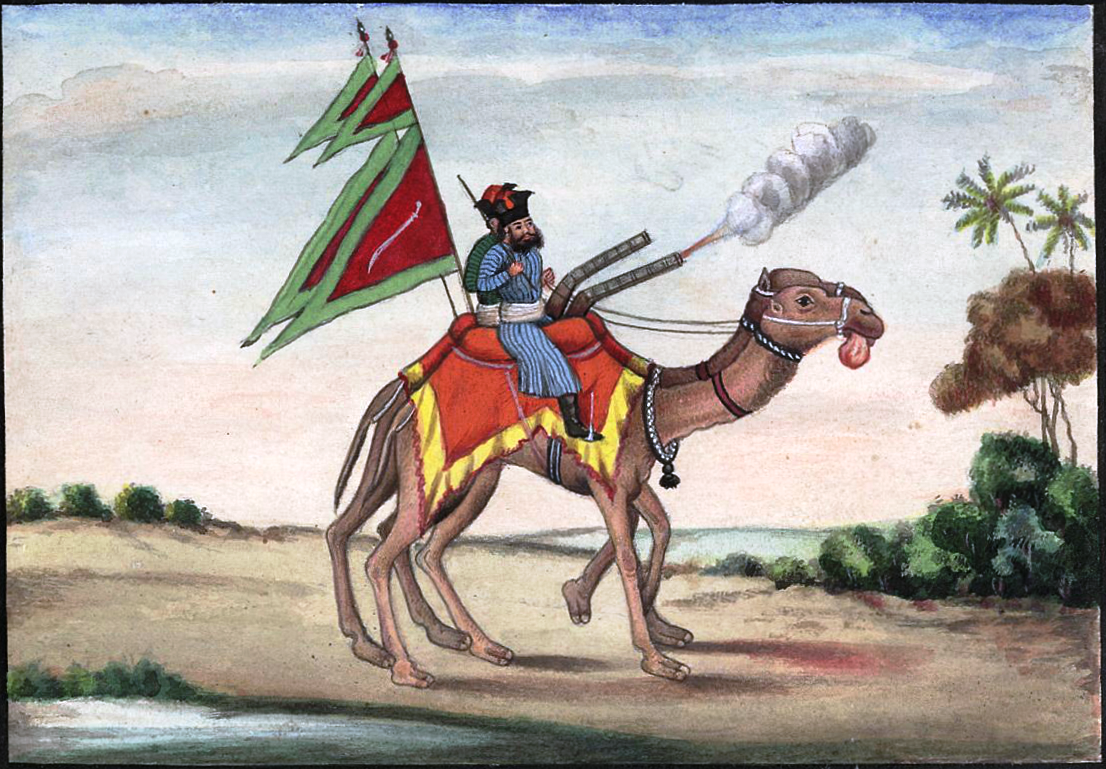
Camel-mounted swivel gun (zamburak)

Mughal light artillery, also known as artillery of the stirrup, consisted of a variety of smaller weapons. Animal-borne swivel guns saw widespread use in several forms. Elephants carried two pieces of "elephant barrel" (gajnal and hathnal) artillery and two soldiers to fire them. The elephants served only to transport the weapons and their crew and they dismounted before firing. "Camel guns" (shutarnal or zamburak) and "swivel guns" on the other hand were carried on camel-back and were fired while mounted. Other light guns were mounted on wheeled carts, pulled by oxen or horses.

Mobile field artillery was a core part of the military power of the Mughal empire that distinguished Mughal troops from most of their enemies. A status symbol for the emperor, pieces of artillery would always accompany the Mughal emperor on his journeys through the empire. The main role of Mughal artillery in battle was to counter hostile war elephants which were common in warfare on the Indian subcontinent. But although emperor Akbar personally designed gun carriages to improve the accuracy of his cannons, Mughal artillery was more effective at scaring the opponent's elephants off the battlefield. The ensuing chaos in the hostile ranks would enable the Mughal armies to defeat the enemy's troops.

Grenadiers and rocket-bearing soldiers were also considered part of the Mughal light artillery corps. The Mughal artillery corps employed rockets, which are considered to be the predecessor of Mysorean rockets that employed by Hyder Ali and Tipu Sultan Despite packing a considerable punch on the battlefield, the rockets were quite lightweight and easy to transport, as it was recorded that a camel can carry up to 20 Mughal rockets. During the reign of Akbar, he ordered many rockets. It is recorded that he once ordered 16,000 rockets for a single garrison.

== See also ==
- Mughal weapons
