= Bhandarkar Oriental Research Institute =

Research institute in Pune, India

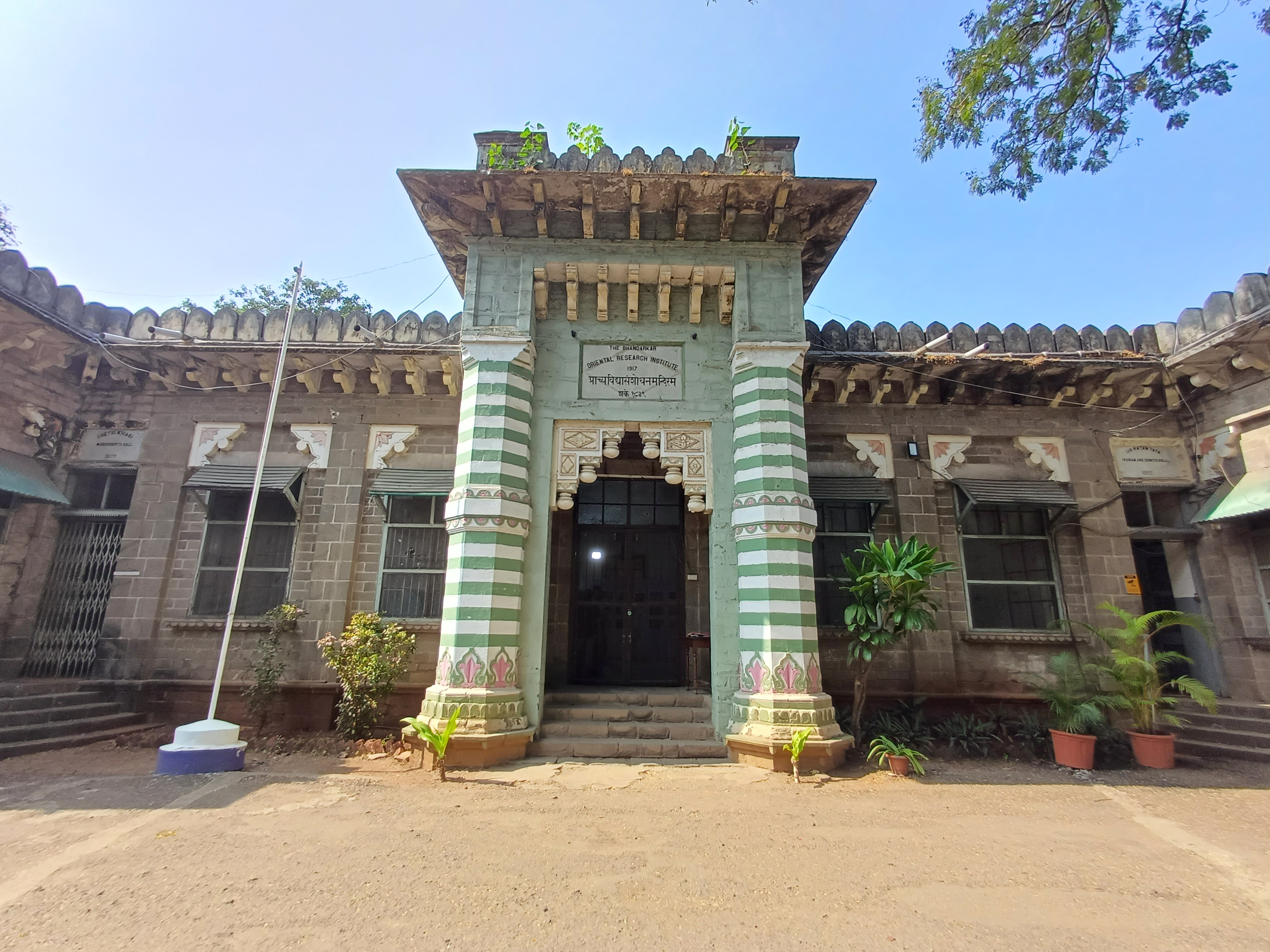
- Main building, 2023
- Established: 6 July 1917; 109 years ago
- Focus: Indology
- Address: 812, Chiplunkar Road (Law College Road), Shivajinagar, Pune, 411004
- Location: Pune, Maharashtra, India
- Coordinates: 18.51953°N 73.82996°E
- Interactive map of Bhandarkar Oriental Research Institute
- Website: bori.ac.in

The Bhandarkar Oriental Research Institute (BORI) is a research institute involved in the conservation, preservation, and research of old manuscripts and rare books related to Orientalism, particularly Indology. It is located in Pune, Maharashtra, India. It was founded on 6 July 1917 and named after Ramakrishna Gopal Bhandarkar (1837–1925), a scholar of Orientalism. The institute is well known for its collection of old Sanskrit and Prakrit manuscripts.

== The institute ==
This institute is of a public trust registered under Act XXI of 1860. Initially, the institute received an annual grant of 3,000 rupees from the government of Bombay. Presently, it is partially supported by annual grants from the government of Maharashtra. The institute also receives grants from the government of India and the University Grants Commission for specific research projects.

The institute has one of the largest collections of rare books and manuscripts in South Asia, consisting of over 125,000 books and 29,510 manuscripts. The institute publishes a journal, Annals of the Bhandarkar Oriental Research Institute, four times a year. The institute also hosts the Manuscripts Resource and Conservation Centre under the auspices of the National Mission for Manuscripts, a project of the Ministry of Culture of the government of India. In 2007, the Rigveda manuscripts preserved at the Institute were included in UNESCO's Memory of the World Register.

Firodiya Auditorium, Bhandarkar Oriental Research Institute.

== The Manuscript collection ==
The government of Bombay, in 1866, started a pan Indian Manuscript Collection project. Noted scholars like Georg Bühler, F. Kielhorn, Peter Peterson, Ramkrishna Gopal Bhandarkar, S. R. Bhandarkar, Kathavate and Ghate collected more than 17,000 important manuscripts under this project. This collection was first deposited at Elphinstone College in Bombay. Then it was transferred to Deccan College (Pune) for better preservation. After the Bhandarkar Oriental Research Institute (BORI) was founded in 1917, the BORI founders proposed to offer even better preservation and research. Hence Lord Willingdon, the then governor of the Bombay Presidency and the first president of BORI, transferred the valuable government collection of manuscripts to the BORI on 1 April 1918. The first curator, P.K. Gode took active initiatives to enhance this collection. Presently, the Institute has over 29,000 manuscripts.

The largest part of the collection (17,877 Manuscripts) is part of the "Government Manuscript Library", while there is an additional collection of 11,633 manuscripts. The most prized collections include a paper manuscript of the Cikitsāsārasangraha dated 1320 CE and a palmleaf manuscript of the Upamitibhavaprapañcakathā dated 906 CE.

Among the several scholars referring to the works at BORI, the most well-known person arguably is the Bharat Ratna awardee, Pt. Pandurang Vaman Kane.

== The critical edition of the Mahabharata ==
A long-term project under the auspices of BORI, started on 1 April 1919, was the preparation of a critical edition of the Mahabharata. V.S. Sukthankar was appointed general editor of the project on 1 August 1925 and he continued until his death on 21 January 1943. After his death, S.K. Belvalkar was appointed general editor on 1 April 1943. On 1 April 1961, P. L. Vaidya was appointed as general editor of the project on the retirement of S. K. Belvalkar. R. N. Dandekar was appointed as the joint general editor on 6 July 1957. To widespread acclaim, the completion for publication was announced on 22 September 1966, by Sarvapalli Radhakrishnan, then president of India, at a special function held at the institute.

The Shloka composition in the BORI critical edition of the Mahabharata

- Arjuna – 35% in the form of Anusthipchand (various names used as a glorification of the protagonist of the epic)
- Krishna – 19%
- Yudhisthira – 14%
- Bhishma – 10%
- Duryodhana – 8%
- Bhima – 6%

Other characters represent around 10% of shlokas

The critical edition was collated from 1,259 manuscripts. This edition in 19 volumes (more than 15,000 demi-quarto size pages) comprised the critically constituted text of the 18 parvas of the Mahabharata consisting of more than 89,000 verses, an elaborate critical apparatus and a prolegomena on the material and methodology (volume I), written by V.S. Sukthankar.

Further work since the initial publication has produced a critical edition of the Harivamsa, a pratika index, a bibliography of ancillary materials, and a cultural index. The project of preparing a critical edition of the Harivamsa was inaugurated by the president of India, Rajendra Prasad, on 19 November 1954. The publication was completed in November 1971. The critical edition in two volumes consists of the four parvans of the Harivamsa. The pratika Index in six volumes consists of 360,000 verse quarters with appendices. Two volumes of the cultural index have been published so far. The constituted text of the critical edition has also been made available on CD-ROM.

== BharatVidya.in and Educational Activities ==
=== Online Courses During the Pandemic ===
During the COVID-19 pandemic, the Institute initiated online education programs, beginning with a certificate course on Indian heritage delivered via the Zoom video conferencing platform. The various online courses attracted over 2,400 participants within the first year from 13 countries.

In 2021, the institute launched an online course on the Mahabharata, based on its Critical Edition. In December 2021, Prime Minister Narendra Modi praised the effort during his Mann Ki Baat address, noting that over 1,200 learners had registered within months.

=== BharatVidya Platform Launch ===
Building on this momentum, BORI launched BharatVidya (bharatvidya.in), a dedicated online platform, in September 2022. It was inaugurated by Union Finance Minister Nirmala Sitharaman. The platform was designed to deliver authentic, source-based knowledge on Indian civilization, especially in domains with contested narratives.

BharatVidya offers over 20 self-paced courses across topics such as the Vedas, Sanskrit, Indian philosophy, archaeology, Mahabharata, temple architecture, Kautilya's Arthashastra, Indian arts and cultural traditions, Buddhism and Jainism, IKS and Dharmaśāstra. Each course grants lifetime access and certificates co-issued by BORI and BharatVidya.

The institute has launched online courses based on its iconic scholarly publications, such as the Critical Edition of the Mahabharata and P.V. Kane’s History of Dharmashastra. These foundational texts are now part of digital learning modules offered through BharatVidya.

=== Alignment with National Education Policy (NEP) 2020 ===
BharatVidya’s curriculum aligns with the National Education Policy 2020, which encourages the incorporation of Indian Knowledge Systems (IKS) in higher education. In 2024, BORI introduced IKS courses in Marathi to expand access for regional learners.

The Institute also organises national and regional conferences aimed at promoting indigenous education and NEP compliance.

== Preservation and Conservation Efforts ==
=== Digitization and Public Access ===
The Bhandarkar Oriental Research Institute (BORI) has undertaken significant digital preservation initiatives to safeguard its vast repository of rare manuscripts, palm-leaf texts, and printed books. In the mid-2010s, the institute digitized approximately 16,000 rare volumes—comprising over 7.5 million pages—using non-destructive scanning techniques.

The digitization project was supported by Yardi Systems, which contributed specialized equipment and funding through corporate social responsibility efforts.

The digitized content was made publicly accessible via BoriLib.com, an online portal developed in collaboration with the Centre for Development of Advanced Computing (C-DAC). After the discontinuation of BoriLib in 2023, efforts are underway to relaunch the digital library in 2026 with enhanced accessibility and cataloging features.

=== Manuscript Conservation Laboratory ===
In April 2023, BORI launched a dedicated conservation laboratory, supported by funding from the Government of Maharashtra. The facility processes 4–5 books daily using archival preservation techniques such as manual deacidification, rebinding, and repair. The lab has also taken on private projects involving the restoration of personal genealogies, colonial-era documents, and rare religious texts. Its internship program has provided hands-on training to students from local institutions, with some going on to join public museum initiatives.

=== National Mission for Manuscripts ===
BORI is both a Manuscript Conservation Centre (MCC) and Manuscript Resource Centre (MRC) under the Ministry of Culture’s National National Mission for Manuscripts (NAMAMI). Since its accreditation in 2003, BORI has documented over 46,000 manuscripts across Maharashtra and Goa, and treated more than 1,200 for conservation.

== Donation by Nizam and the "Nizam Guest House" ==
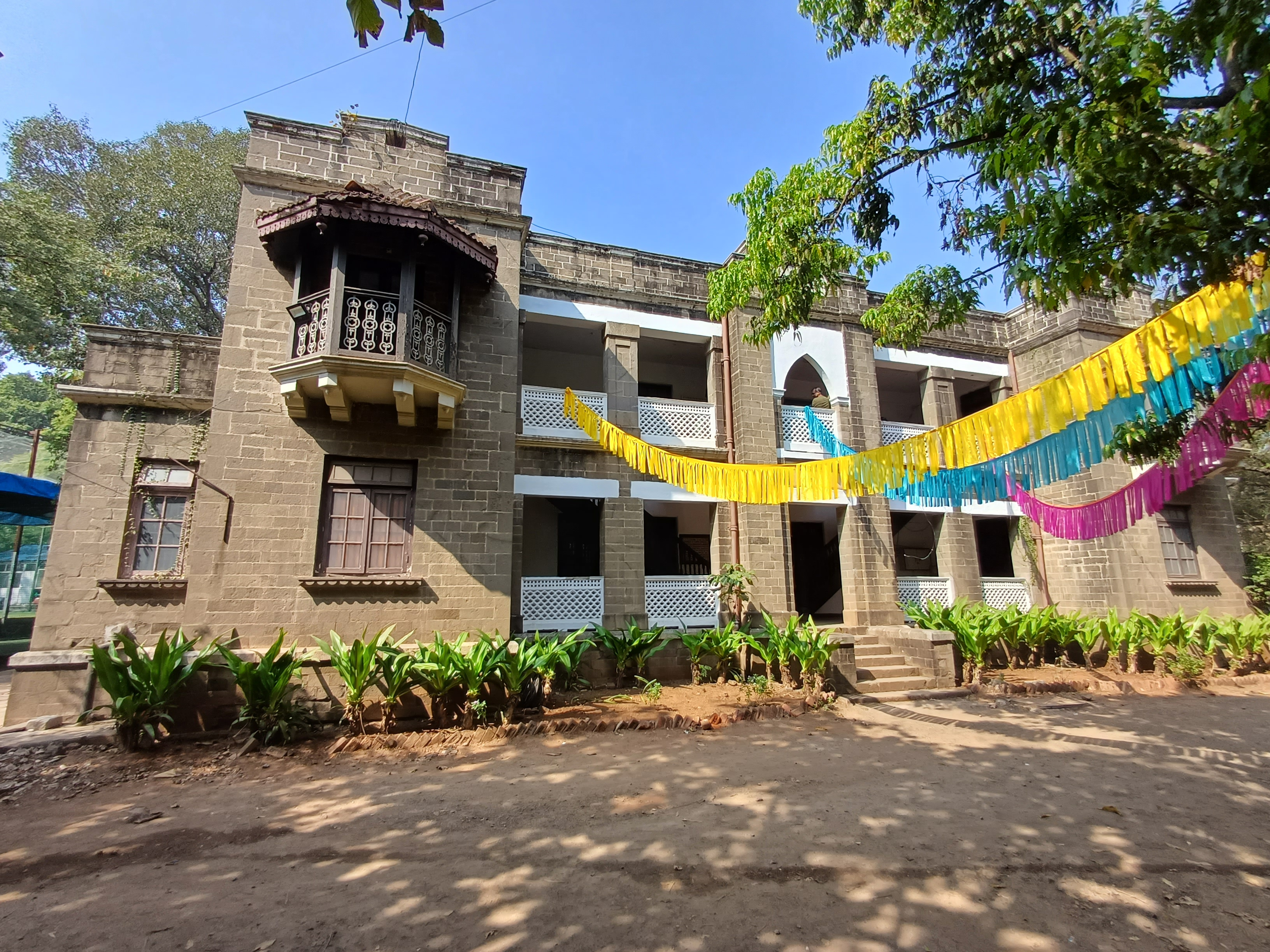
Left side view of Nizam's Guest House (BORI)

In 1932, there was a need for money for the publication of the Mahabharata. A formal request was made to the seventh nizam of Hyderabad, Mir Osman Ali Khan, who granted Rs.1000 /- per year for a period of 11 years and offered Rs 50,000 for construction of the guest house which is called "Nizam Guest House".

The office of the university was operated at Nizam Guest House until 1 June 1949.

== Vandalism in 2004 ==
The institute was vandalized on 5 January 2004 by a mob composed of members of an extremist self-styled Maratha youth squad, calling themselves the Sambhaji Brigade, named after the elder son of Chhatrapati Shivaji.

The incident provoked widespread reaction and led historian Gajanan Mehendale to destroy parts of his in-progress biography of Shivaji.

The vandalism and the subsequent ban on the book were denounced in a statement by historians, among whom were R.S. Sharma, R.C. Thakran, Suraj Bhan, Irfan Habib, D N Jha, Shireen Moosvi and K. M. Shrimali. Oxford University Press, publisher of James Laine's Shivaji: Hindu King in Islamic India, withdrew the book after protests from historian Ninad Bedekar and other right-wing politicians due to allegedly objectionable statements about Chhatrapati Shivaji Maharaj.

== See also ==
- Pandurang Vaman Kane
- Deccan College Post-Graduate and Research Institute
