= Waghya =

Dog of a Maratha king (died 1680)

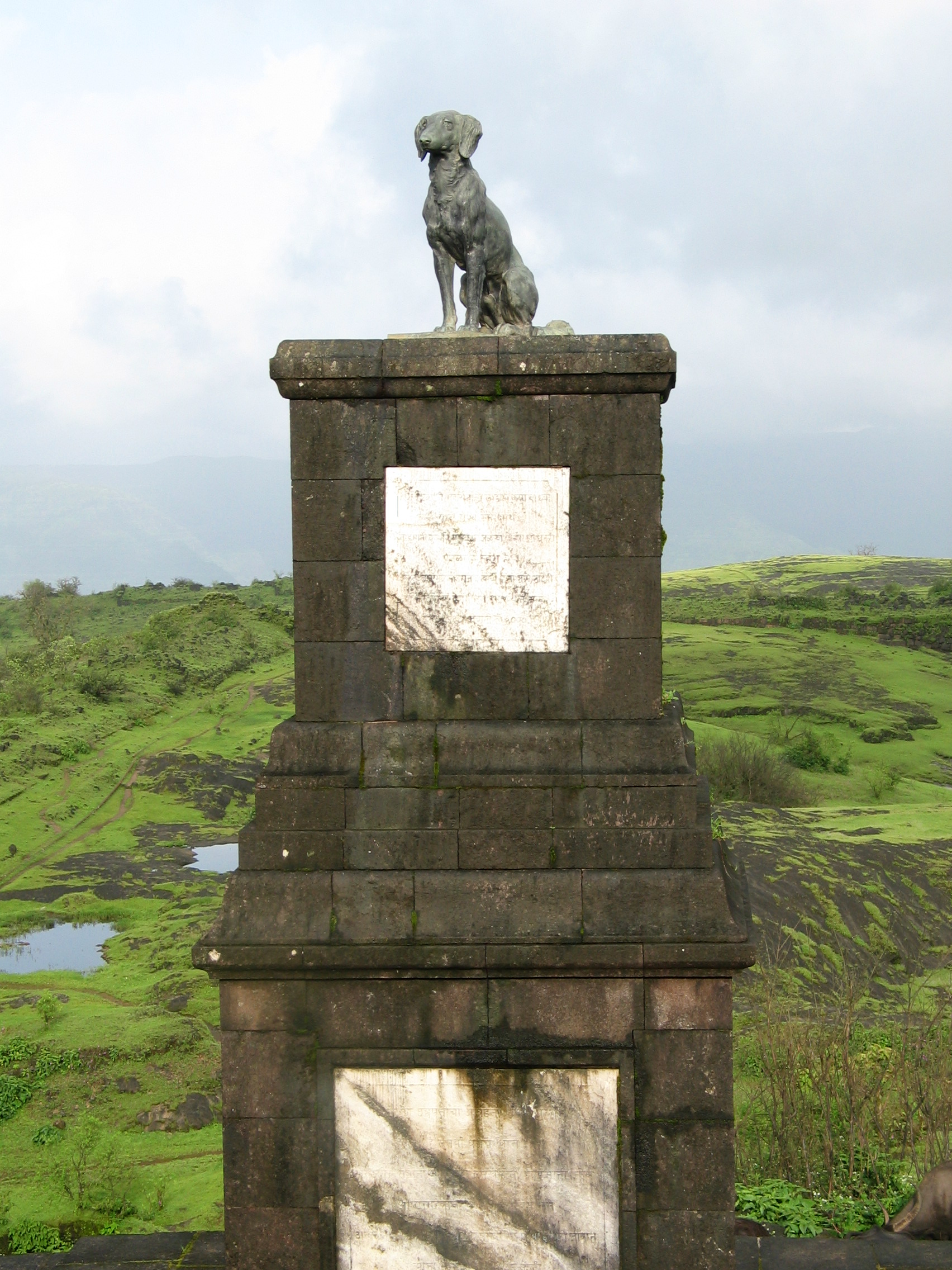
- Statue of Waghya at Raigad Fort
- Other name: Vaghya
- Species: Canis familiaris
- Breed: Mixed
- Sex: Male
- Died: 1680
- Resting place: Raigad, Maratha Empire
- Owner: Chatrapati Shivaji Maharaj

Waghya (meaning tiger in Marathi) was a mixed-breed pet dog of Maratha king Chhatrapati Shivaji Maharaj, known as the epitome of loyalty and eternal devotion. After Chhatrapati Shivaji Maharaj's death, he is said to have jumped into his master's funeral pyre and immolated himself.

A statue was put up on a pedestal next to Chhatrapati Shivaji Maharaj's samadhi at Raigad Fort. In 2011 the statue of Waghya was removed by alleged members of the Sambhaji Brigade as a protest but was later reinstalled.

== Monument ==
In memory of Waghya, a memorial was built next to Shivaji Maharaj's samadhi at Raigad Fort with a donation by Indore’s Prince Tukoji Holkar in 1906, who gave ₹5,000 (equivalent to ₹1.7 million or US$17,000 in 2023) towards the dog's statue.

Reportedly by Mid-Day, the statue of Waghya was erected on a Samadhi at Shivaji's memorial in 1936 under the banner of Shri Shivaji Raigad Smarak Samati (SSRSS) in leadership of Narasimha Chintaman Kelkar.

== Controversies ==
=== Attack on Waghya's Statue on Raigarh Fort ===
In 2011, Sambhaji Brigade, an extremist group was responsible for a protest and attack against Waghya's statue located on Raigad Fort next to Shivaji Maharaj's memorial. The group claimed that the dog was not real and there shouldn't be a memorial for it. This act was strongly opposed by local Dhangar community for they believe that the dog was real.

=== 2025 Controversy over the statue ===
In March 2025, Sambhajiraje Chhatrapati, a former Rajya Sabha member and descendant of Shivaji, called for its removal, arguing that there was no contemporary historical evidence for Waghya during Shivaji's lifetime. Historian Shrimant Kokate supported the demand.

The demand was opposed by Laxman Hake, a leader associated with the Dhangar and Other Backward Classes (OBC) communities, who criticised Sambhajiraje's position, and author and activist Sanjay Sonawani, who disputed the claim that the Waghya story lacked historical references. Udayanraje Bhosale, another descendant of Shivaji, also raised the issue during an April 2025 visit to Raigad Fort.

Chief Minister of Maharashtra Devendra Fadnavis described the dispute as "unnecessary" and said it should be resolved through discussion, while Deputy Chief Minister Ajit Pawar questioned the demand for the statue's removal and said that attracting industries and providing employment to young people were more important issues.

== In popular culture ==
Waghya's heroic story was portrayed in Rajsanyas, a play by Ram Ganesh Gadkari, a noted Marathi playwright.

== See also ==
- List of individual dogs
- Raigad fort
