= Sambhaji Brigade =

Maratha organisation in Maharashtra, India

Sambhaji Brigade is a Maratha outfit, based in Maharashtra, India. It is a branch of the Maratha Seva Sangh. The Brigade is named after the Maratha king Chatrapati Sambhaji Maharaj son of the first Maratha king Chatrapati Shivaji Maharaj.

Known for its controversial and often violent agitations, it gained exposure after its members attacked, vandalised and ransacked the Bhandarkar Oriental Research Institute in Pune, claiming that it helped American scholar James Laine’s book on Shivaji titled Shivaji: Hindu King in Islamic India, certain parts of which were unacceptable to them. During this attack on BORI, they destroyed many precious and rare manuscripts which laid decades of research to waste.

Sambhaji Brigade demands reservation for the Maratha community and wants inclusion of Marathas in Other Backward Classes (OBC) category. They also demand free education for Maratha children and registered marriages instead of religious ceremonies. The organization has been described as having an anti-Brahmin caste stand and has been repeatedly criticized for its extremist views.

== Controversies ==
Sambhaji Brigade is known for aggressive and violent agitations. Their first violent protest was an attack on Bhandarkar Oriental Research Institute. Several historical records were destroyed in this attack including handwritten copies by Adya Shankaracharya. This was followed by uprooting of Dadoji Kondev's Statue from Lal Mahal, then by attacks on Waghya dog's statue on Raigad fort and then by attacks on R. R. Patil.

=== 2004 James Laine incident ===
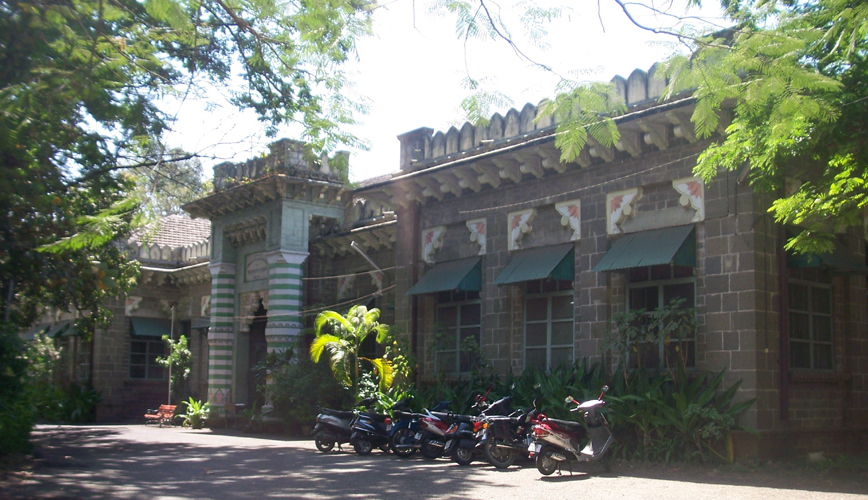
Bhandarkar Oriental Research Institute, Pune

A group of brigade members attacked and vandalised the Bhandarkar Oriental Research Institute(BORI) in January 2004. The attack was prompted by the controversy over James Laine's controversial book Shivaji: Hindu King in Islamic India (OUP, 2003); scholars from the institute had collaborated with Laine on information for his book about the founder of the Maratha Empire, Shivaji, which the group had viewed as blasphemy claiming that book features "derogatory remarks on Shivaji and his mother". Angry mob of Sambhaji Brigade stormed the BORI and destroyed priceless manuscripts and artifacts. Then Prime Minister of India Atal Bihari Vajpayee condemned this violence though he upheld the importance of disagreement and debate in a democracy. After the incident 72 members of the group were arrested. In 2004 the director-general of police announced that a legal ban on the organization was being investigated, but as of 2015, organization has never been banned.

=== Statue of Dadoji Konddev ===
In 2010, NCP-controlled Pune Municipal Corporation's (PMC) decision to remove the statue of Dadoji Kondadev was claimed to be consistent with the party's policy to encourage demands of hardline Maratha groups. It is claimed that such a stance had helped the NCP maintain its dominance among the Maratha youth in Pune and rural Maharashtra. Sambhaji Brigade was also involved in a protest to remove the statue of Dadoji Kondadev from Lal Mahal in Pune claiming that he was just introduced as teacher of Shivaji by Brahmin historians. About 30 to 40 people entered Pune Municipal Corporation (PMC) and attacked Mayor's office. This led to a statewide protest by Political parties such as BJP, Shiv Sena and MNS. Following to this Government of Maharashtra (which included NCP) removed name of Dadoji Konddev from school history books stating that Government's committee of historians found no evidence that Dadoji Konddev was teacher of Shivaji. The move was heavily criticized by historians and scholars. Some members of the government-appointed committee also resigned in protest citing that the committee head Jaysing Pawar only had caste considerations in mind when submitting the report, without regard to actual historical evidence.

=== Attack on Waghya's Statue on Raigad Fort ===
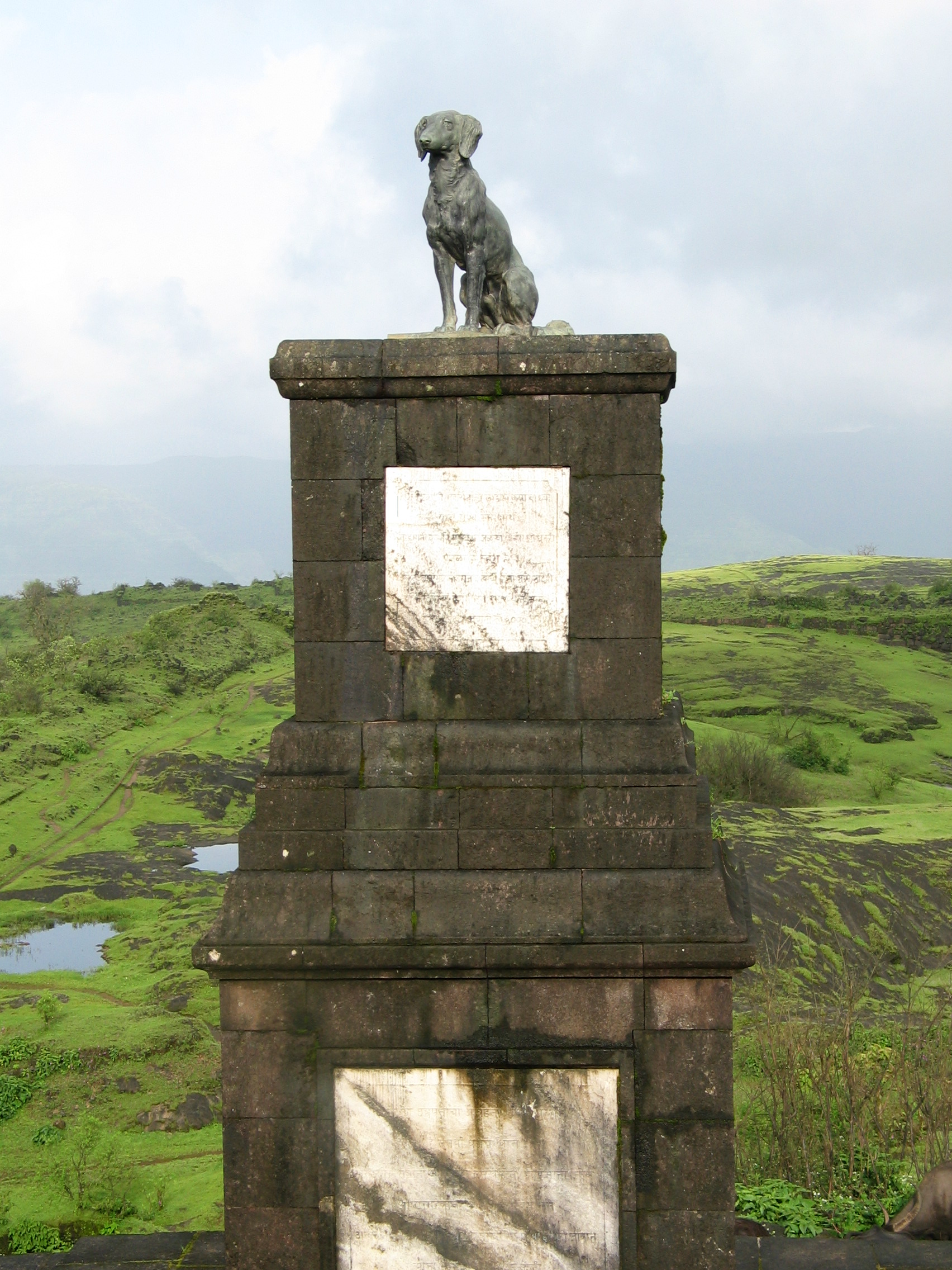
Statue of Waghya at Raigad Fort

The group was also responsible for a protest and attack against a dog's (Waghya) statue located on Raigad Fort next to Shivaji's memorial. According to legend the dog (named Waghya) was Shivaji's dog. The group claimed that the dog was not real and there should not be a memorial for it. This act was strongly opposed by local Dhangar community for they believe that the dog was real. In fact many people say that Waghya was Shivaji's dog and the reason for why the memorial was constructed over there.

=== Ram Ganesh Gadkari bust vandalism ===
In January 2017, four Sambhaji Brigade followers pulled down a bust of Marathi playwright Ram Ganesh Gadkari which was located in Sambhaji Park in central Pune and threw it in the nearby Mutha River. The Chandraseniya Kayastha Prabhu (CKP) community, the community to which Gadkari belonged later organized a meeting to protest this incident at the Ram Ganesh Gadkari Rangayatan (a theater named after Gadkari) in Thane. Sambhaji Brigade claimed that Gadkari had portrayed Sambhaji in bad light in an unfinished play Rajsanyas, written a century ago by referring to some out-of-context content.

Indian National Congress leader Nitesh Rane later rewarded the vandals and made inflammatory remarks claiming that he had announced a reward earlier in 2016 for removing the bust, and was proud of the act carried out by the accused. He also tweeted that Sambhaji Brigade was not involved in the act, even when the outfit had claimed responsibility for the action. The vandalism was largely seen as an attempt to garner votes by playing the community card in the city's civic elections which were due to be held in a few weeks.

=== Reservation ===
Lawyer Gunaratna Sadavarte, who opposed a quota for Marathas in jobs and reservation, was attacked in December 2018 by a worker affiliated to the outfit.

=== Ink thrown at journalist ===
On 5 December 2021, two activists of Sambhaji Brigade hurled ink at a journalist and writer Girish Kuber in Nashik in protest against some controversial references about Chhatrapati Sambhaji Maharaj in his book.

== Leadership ==
Purushottam Khedekar is one of the founders of this organisation. He is also a prominent leader in the Maratha Seva Sangh, a related organisation and co-founder of Shiva Dharma. Khedekar has written several books including Bhatta Cha Kardhankal and Maharaj Mala Maaf Kara (Translates as "Your Majesty, I ask for your forgiveness"). Pune Police issued an arrest warrant against Khedekar for inciting anti-Brahmin feelings. In 2015 he submitted an affidavit in the court and apologised unconditionally for his remarks on Brahmin women.

== Shiva Dharma ==
The Maratha Seva Sangh, founded by Khedekar, has been demanding reservations for the Maratha community and is also supporting creation of a new religion of its own called 'Shiva Dharma'
