= Dadoji Kondadeo =

Indian jagir administrator

- Jagirdar of Pune
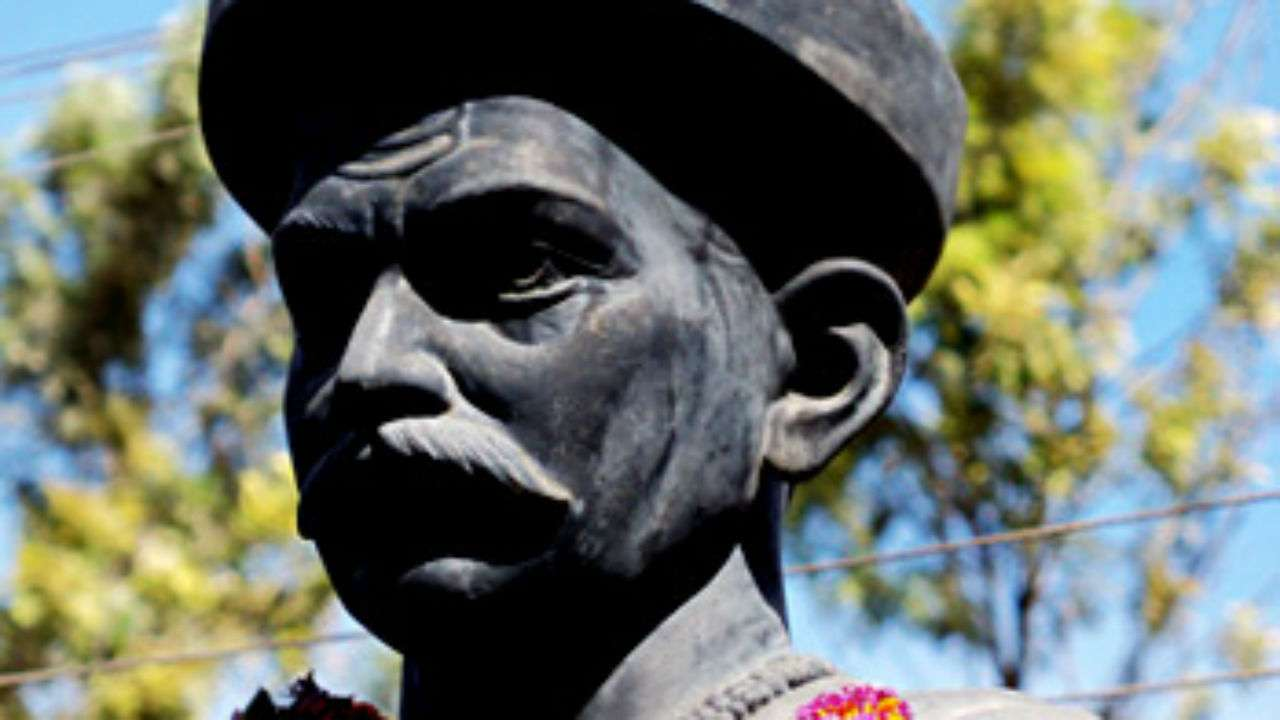
- Statue of Dadoji Kondadev Lal Mahal Statue
- Born: near Sindkhed Raja, Buldhana District
- Died: 7 March 1647; Pune, Bijapur Sultanate (present-day Maharashtra, India)
- Occupation: Jagirdar, Administrator

Dadoji Kondadeo (also spelled as Dadoji Konddev) (died 7 March 1647) was an administrator of the Pune jagir and the nearby Kondana fort. He was appointed by Shahaji, a noble and general of the Adilshahi sultanate of Bijapur.

== Biography ==
=== Early life ===
Kondadeo was born in a Brahmin family near Sindkhed Raja, Buldhana District and spent time at Malthan, in the present-day Shirur taluka of Pune District. He gradually rose high in Adilshahi service and became the chief civil administrator on behalf of Adilshah at Kondana fort before managing Shahaji's jagir.

=== Dadoji and the Pune jagir ===
After Shahaji joined the service of Adilshahi in 1637, his family's Pune jagir (fief) was restored to him by the sultan. Since Shahaji was to be deployed in Bangalore by Adilshah, Shahaji appointed Kondadeo as administrator of the Pune jagir. As the administrator, Konddeo established complete control over the Maval region, winning over or subduing most of the local Maval Deshpandes (chiefs). He also rebuilt the settlement of Pune, including the construction of the Lal Mahal palace, and encouraged the return of prominent families who had left during its destruction by another Adilshahi general, Murar Jaggdeo, in 1631. Shahaji also selected Pune for the residence of his wife, Jijabai and young son, Shivaji, the future founder of the Maratha Empire. According to some sources, it was here that young Shivaji's development was entrusted to Konddeo at the request of his mother, Jijabai.

== Modern controversies ==
- 19th century Social reformer, Jyotirao Phule in his powada (a traditional Marathi ballad) on Shivaji, acknowledges Konddeo's role as Shivaji's teacher but gives much greater credit to Jijabai in encouraging Shivaji to take up arms and fight for the freedom of his people. He also minimizes Konddeo's role as a mentor by saying that "there is no need to teach a fish how to swim".
- In 2008, Government of Maharashtra renamed the Dadoji Konddeo award as the Best Sports Coach award after Maratha groups protested against highlighting the Brahmin tutor's influence.
- In 2010, Nationalist Congress Party-controlled Pune Municipal Corporation's (PMC) decision to remove the statue of Konddeo at Lal Mahal palace was claimed to be consistent with the party's policy to encourage demands of hardline Maratha groups. It is claimed that such a stance had helped the NCP maintain its dominance among the Maratha youth in Pune and rural Maharashtra. The status was removed because of the protests of the Sambhaji Brigade, a Maratha group claiming that the statue of Konddeo as the teacher of Shivaji was introduced by Brahmin historians.

== Legacy ==
- Dadaji Kondadev Stadium, a stadium in Thane region of Mumbai in Maharashtra is named after Dadoji Konddev.
- Dadoji Konddeo award, an award given to prominent personalities who teaches, guides young generation in various fields (but renamed it as the "Best Sports Coach award" after Maratha groups protests in 2008.
- Dadoji Konddeo Marg, a road way in Mumbai Maharashtra was named after Dadoji Konddev.

== See also ==
- Gomaji Naik
