= Gajanan Mehendale =

Indian historian and author (1947–2025)

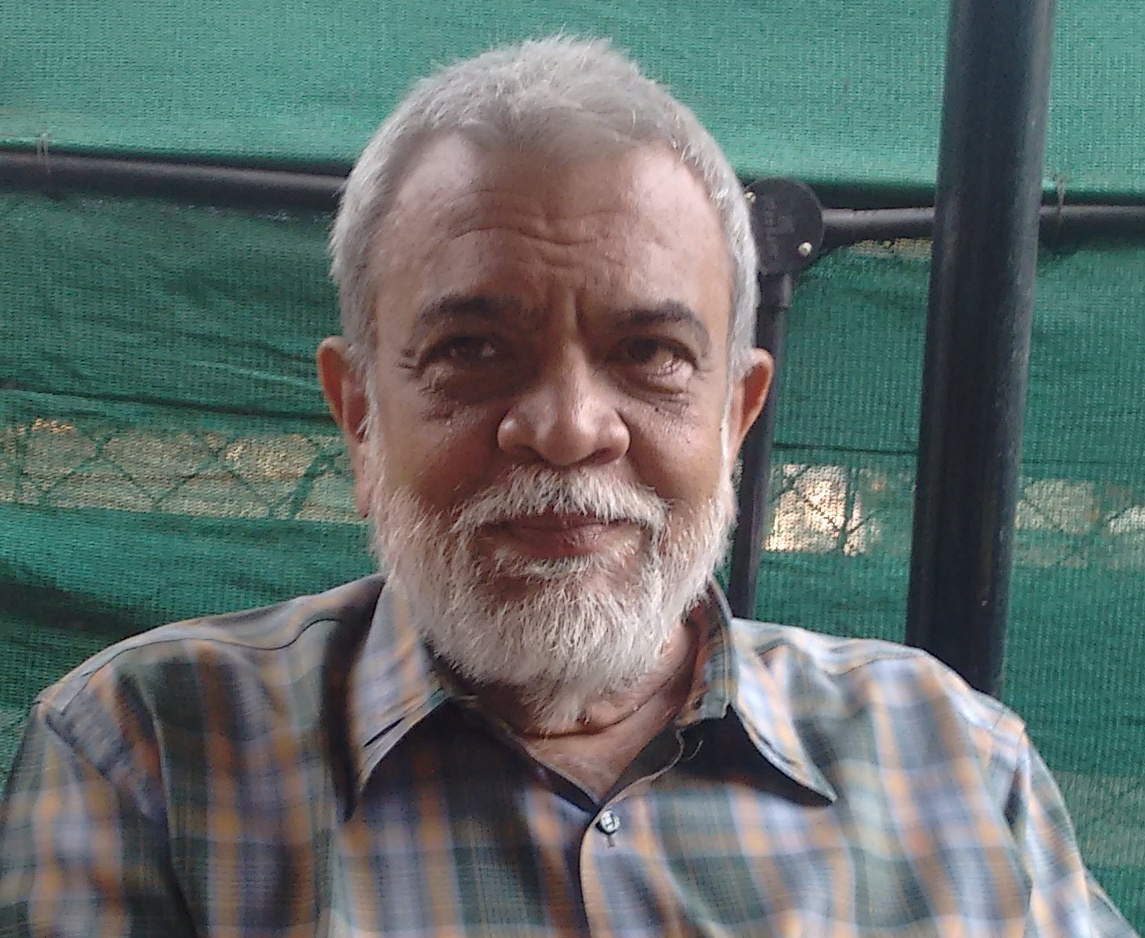
Gajanan Mehendale

Gajanan Bhaskar Mehendale (19 December 1947 – 17 September 2025) was an Indian historian and author, noted for his scholarship on Maratha history, particularly the life and times of Shivaji Maharaj and the Peshwas.

== Early life and education ==
Born on 19 December 1947, Mehendale earned a postgraduate degree in defence studies from Savitribai Phule Pune University. In 1971, he briefly served as a war correspondent during the Bangladesh Liberation War, during which he reported from the India–Pakistan and India–Bangladesh fronts, before devoting himself to historical research.

== Career and scholarship ==
A polyglot, Mehendale mastered Persian, Modi, English, French and German, which he used extensively in his historical work. He was regarded as a leading authority on Maratha history, especially on the life and military campaigns of the 17th-century Maratha ruler Shivaji Maharaj and the lives of the Peshwas. His most acclaimed contribution was Shri Raja Shivchhatrapati (Two Volumes) and Shivaji: His Life and Times, biography of Shivaji Maharaj published in Marathi and English. It is described by scholars as a uniquely detailed and evidence-based account. He also wrote Shivachatrapatinche Armar(The navy of Shivaji), Tipu As He Really Was, Islamchi Olakh: Bharatatil Islami Rajvatinche Dharmik Dhoran and Adilshahi Farmane (The Farmans of Adilshah). His writings have been widely referenced in academic circles in India and other countries.

In December 2003, Mehendale destroyed approximately 400 unpublished pages of his planned two-volume biography Shri Raja Shivchhatrapati. The act was a protest against members of the Shiv Sena, who had publicly smeared the face of Sanskrit scholar Shrikant Bahulkar with black ink following controversy around James Laine's book Shivaji: Hindu King in Islamic India. Mehendale had previously signed a letter that called for the complete withdrawal of Shivaji: Hindu King in Islamic India.

At the time of his death, he was researching Islam and the Mughal emperor Aurangzeb, and was completing a 5,000 page manuscript on the Second World War, which was nearly ready for publication by the time of Mehendale's death.

== Personal life and death ==
Mehendale never married. He died of a heart attack in Pune, on 17 September 2025, at the age of 77. His body was kept at the Bharat Itihas Sanshodhak Mandal for public homage before cremation.

Maharashtra Navnirman Sena founder and chief Raj Thackeray paid tribute to Mehendale, praising his efforts to recover perspectives of the vanquished and describing him as a historian who maintained "complete neutrality."

== Bibliography ==
- Mehendaḷe, Gajānana Bhāskara (1996). Śrī Rājā Śivachatrapatī (in Marathi). Gajānana Bhāskara Mehendaḷe. ISBN 978-8187975038.
- Mehendaḷe, Gajānana Bhāskara (2007). Śrī Rājā Śivachatrapatī (in Hindi). Ḍāyamaṇḍa Pablikeśansa. ISBN 978-81-89724-90-0.
- Mehendaḷe, Gajānana Bhāskara (2022). Chhatrapati Shivaji: Saviour of Hindu India. Shri Bharati Prakashan. ISBN 978-93-92813-93-1.
- Tipu as He Really Was (e-book). Amazon Asia-Pacific Holdings Private Limited. 2018. p. 119. ASIN B07C58GFD1.
- Mehendale, Gajanan Bhaskar (2024). Islamchi Olakh - Bharatatil Islami Rajvatinche Dharmik Dhoran (in Marathi). Aitihasik Sahitya Prakashan. p. 300. ISBN 978-9334062496.
- Mehendale, Gajanan; Bedekar, Ninad; Loankar, Ravindra. Adilshahi Farmane (in Marathi). Diamond Publishers. p. 208. ISBN 978-8189959456.
