= Lal Mahal =

Childhood residence of Shivaji in Pune, Maharashtra

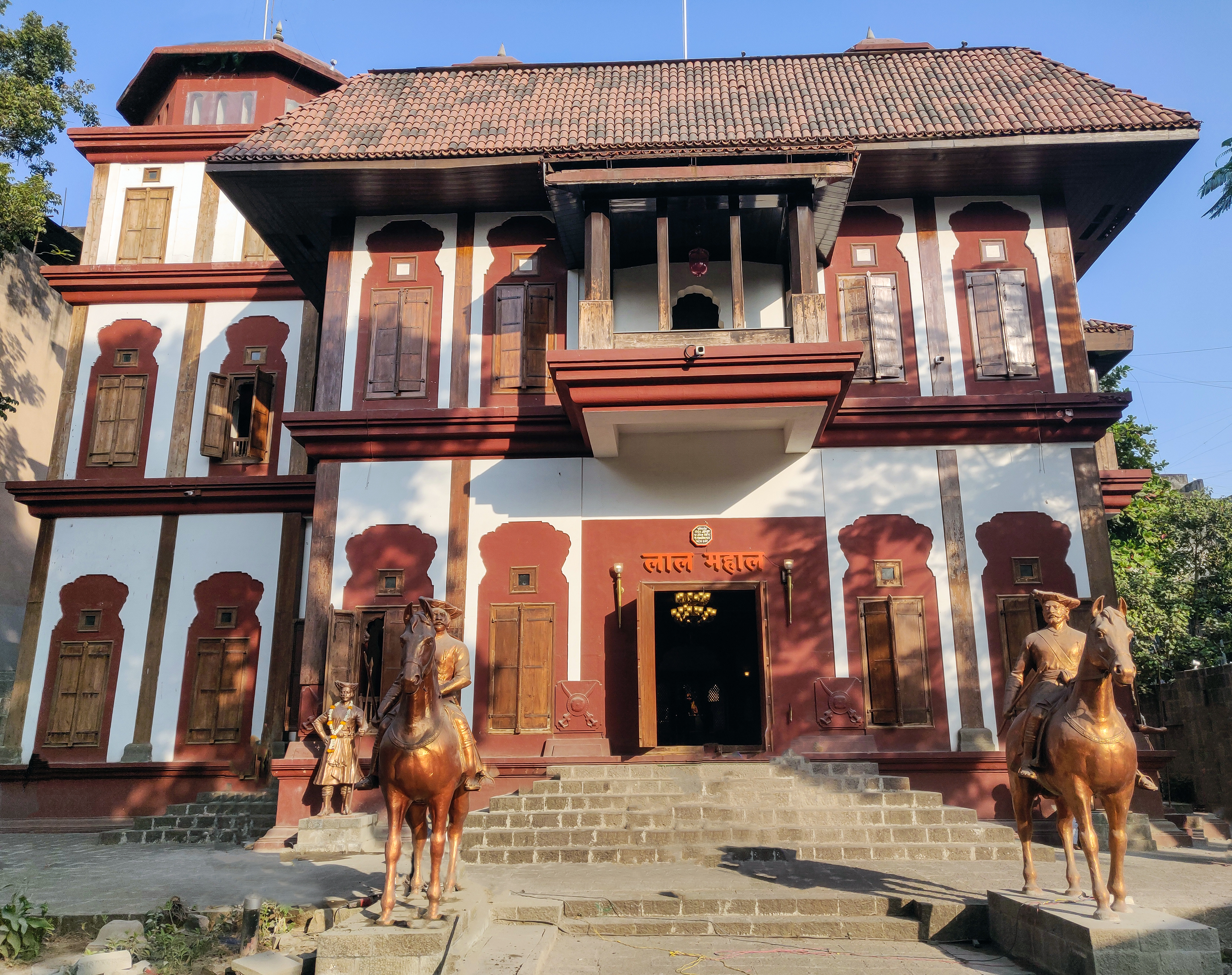
Lal Mahal front view

The Lal Mahal (Red Palace) of Pune is one of the most famous monuments located in Pune, India, where Shivaji I, founder of the Maratha Empire, spent his childhood.

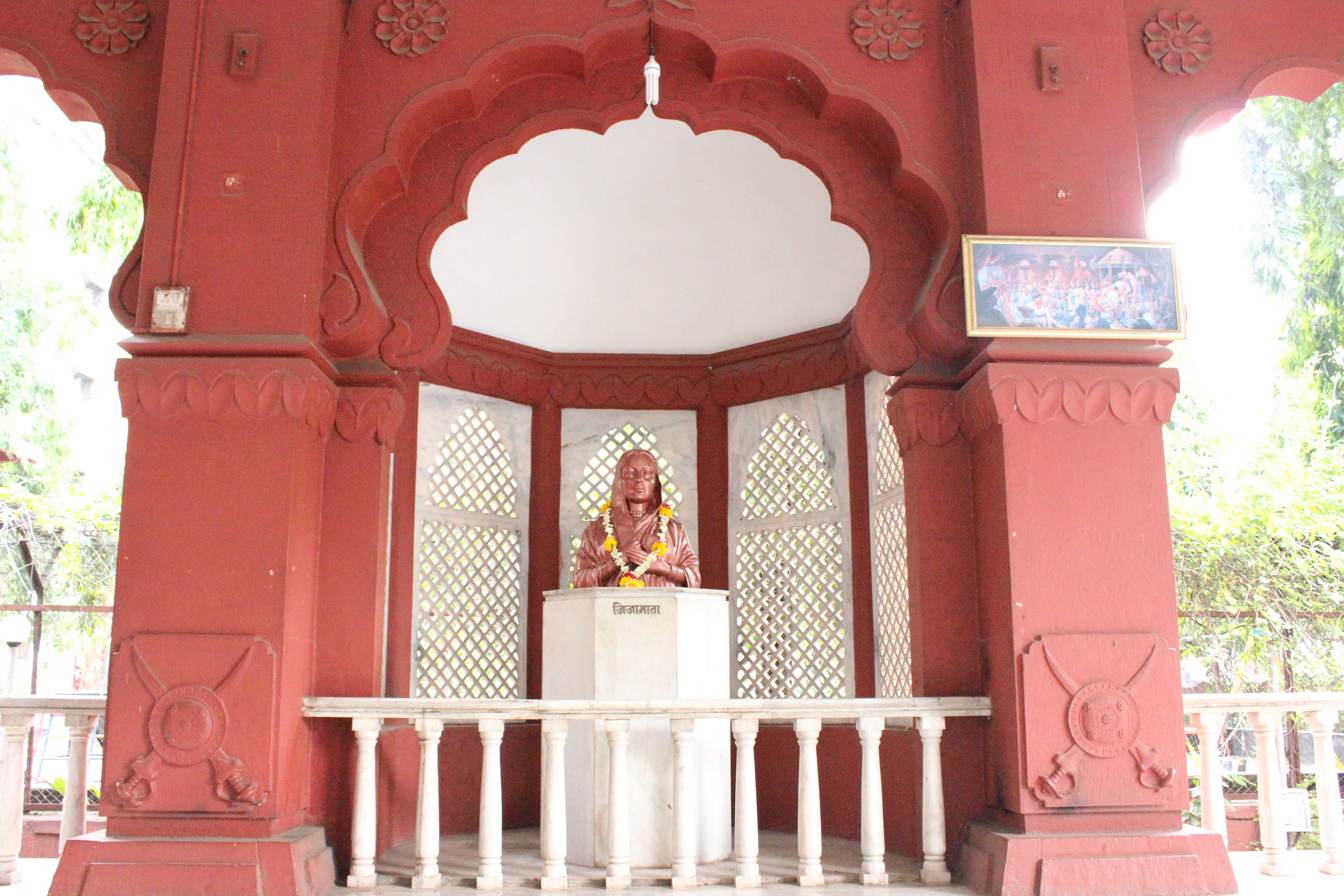
Bust of Jijabai

== History Of Lal Mahal ==
The elaborate palace was built in the Pune jagir by the then jagirdar and future mentor of Chhatrapati Shivaji Maharaj, Dadoji Kondadeo in the year 1630 AD with the idea of rejuvenating the recently razed city of Pune.

He obtained proper permissions from Shahaji, who was then serving the Ahmadnagar Sultanate and hence had jurisdiction over the region.Thus another purpose served by the Mahal was raising Shahaji's son, Shivaji. Young Shivaji grew up here, and stayed in the Lal Mahal with his mother Jijabai till he captured the Torna fort in 1645. Shivaji's marriage with his first wife, Saibai took place in Lal Mahal on 16 May 1640.

The Lal Mahal is also famous for an encounter between Shivaji and Shaista Khan where Shivaji cut off four fingers of the latter's when he was trying to escape from the first-floor window of the Lal Mahal. This was part of a surreptitious guerrilla attack on the massive and entrenched Mughal Army that had camped in Pune, with Shaista occupying (possibly symbolically) Shivaji's childhood home. As a punishment for the ignominy of the defeat despite superior numbers and better armed and fed soldiers, Shaista was transferred by the Mughal Emperor Aurangzeb to Bengal.

Towards the end of the 17th Century, the Lal Mahal was ruined by some people and was eventually razed to the ground as a result of various attacks on the city. It is said that during the construction of the Shaniwarwada, some soil and stones of the Lal Mahal were used for luck. In 1734-35, a few houses were constructed on the land of the Lal Mahal and given for use to Ranoji Shinde and Ramchandraji. The records in the offices of the Peshwas mention that Lal Mahal was used for arranging feasts during the thread-ceremony of Sadashivrao Bhau, son of Chimaji Appa. The exact original location of the Lal Mahal is unknown, however, it was known to be very close to the location of Shaniwarwada, which is roughly where the current reconstruction stands.

== Reconstruction and current structure ==
The current Lal Mahal was built only on a part of the land of the original Lal Mahal. The new Lal Mahal was not rebuilt in the same fashion as the original one and there is not much information found about the area and structure of the original Lal Mahal. The current Lal Mahal was rebuilt by the Pune Municipal Corporation. Construction started in 1984 and was completed in 1988.

The current Lal Mahal is a memorial holding a collection of large-size oil paintings based on the significant events in the life of Shivaji, a statue of Jijabai, a carving depicting Shivaji using a gold plow along with Jijabai, a fiber model of Raigad with horsemen and a huge map of Maharashtra indicating the forts of Shivaji. The popular Jijamata Garden is now a recreational park for kids.

There used to be a statue of the Mahal's original builder, Dadoji Kondadeo, which was of great detail.It was installed during the reconstruction as a tribute to Kondadeo. It was removed in 2010 due to violence and protests regarding its significance.

== Controversies ==
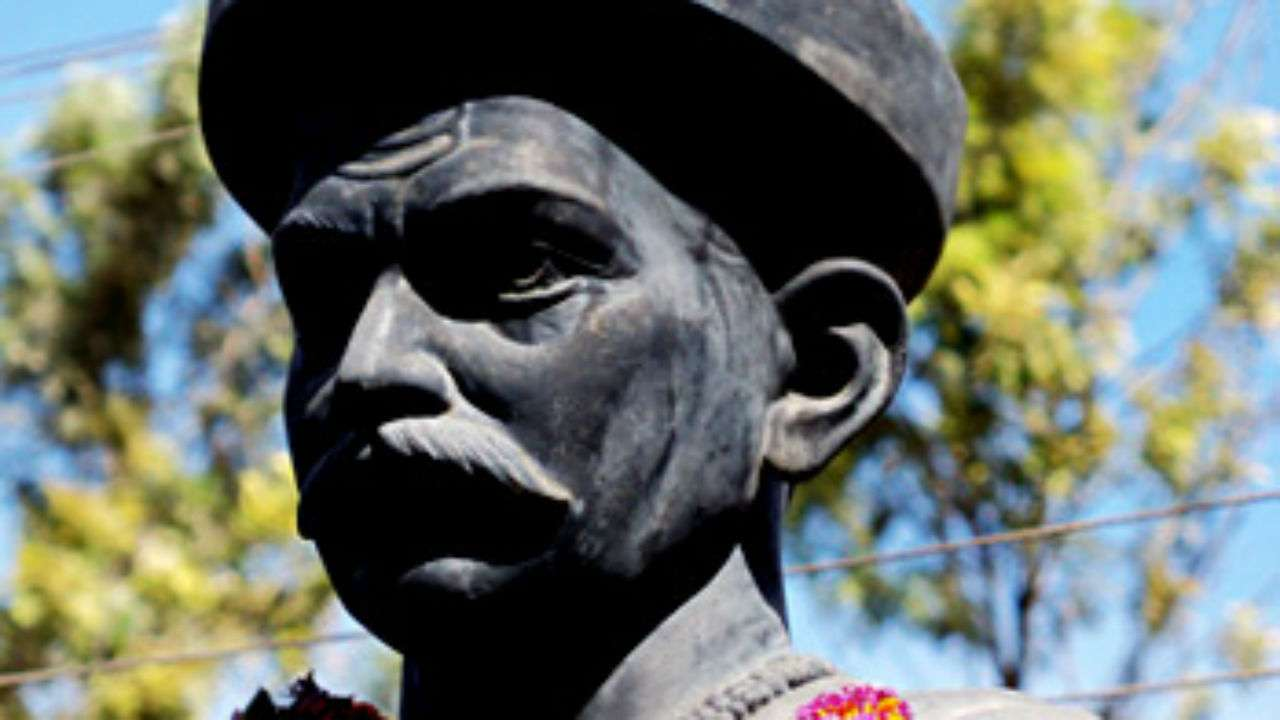
The Statue of Dadoji Kondadeo from Lal Mahal.

There used to be a statue of the Mahal's original builder, Dadoji Kondadeo, which was of great detail and craftsmanship. However, largely due to the actions of the Maratha organization Sambhaji Brigade, the statue was uprooted in 2010 and placed in a municipal garden by the Pune Municipal Corporation. To date, no commemoration of Kondadeo exists on-site.
