= James Laine =

American academic

James W. Laine is an American academic and writer notable for his controversial book on the 17th-century Indian king Shivaji, Shivaji: Hindu King in Islamic India.

== Background ==
James Laine is the Arnold H. Lowe Professor of Religious Studies at Macalester College in St. Paul, Minnesota, United States. He holds a BA (1974) from Texas Tech University, an MTS (1977), and a doctorate in Theology (1984) from Harvard University.

== Shivaji: Hindu King in Islamic India ==
Laine's 2003 book, Shivaji: Hindu King in Islamic India, contained an offhand comment quoting an anecdote concerning Shivaji's parentage, as part of Laine's discussion of the mysteries of Shivaji's unclear relationship with his father. After publication, historians Ninad Bedekar, Gajanan Mehendale, Babasaheb Purandare, Jaysingrao Pawar and former BJP MP Pradeep Rawat publicly condemned the book and also wrote a letter to the publishers, Oxford University Press, urging them to completely withdraw the book. A hardline Maratha group Sambhaji Brigade attacked the Bhandarkar Oriental Research Institute in Pune, India, accusing its high-caste Brahmin scholars as assisting in Laine's so-called slander of Shivaji. In view of the attacks and the public unrest, the book was banned in the state of Maharashtra in January 2004. Filing a petition in the Bombay High Court, James Laine apologized for an offending paragraph on page 93 of the book. Regardless, a warrant was filed for his arrest, and India attempted to have him extradited from the United States.

The publisher Oxford Printing Press (Note: The then Indian subsidiary of Oxford University Press, the original publisher of the book.) promised to delete the paragraph from all future editions of the book, following which the court lifted the ban in 2007. In July 2010, the Supreme Court of India upheld the lifting of the ban, which was followed by public demonstrations against the author and the decision.

Laine offered a longer analysis of the dispute in 2011. He deplored the attacks on Indian scholars and scholarly institutions which he said had no influence over his choice of tone, but acknowledged that his invocation of a joke was insensitive to Indian caste politics and ought not to be defended as freedom of speech.

== Selected works ==
- (with S. S. Bahulkar) The Epic of Shivaji: A Translation and Study of Kavindra. Hyderabad: Orient Longman. 2001. ISBN 9788125020462.
- Shivaji: Hindu king in Islamic India. New York: Oxford University Press. 2003. ISBN 9780195141269.
- Meta-religion: Religion and Power in World History. University of California Press. 2014. ISBN 9780520281370.
