= François Bernier =

French doctor political philosopher, physician and traveler (1620 – 1688)

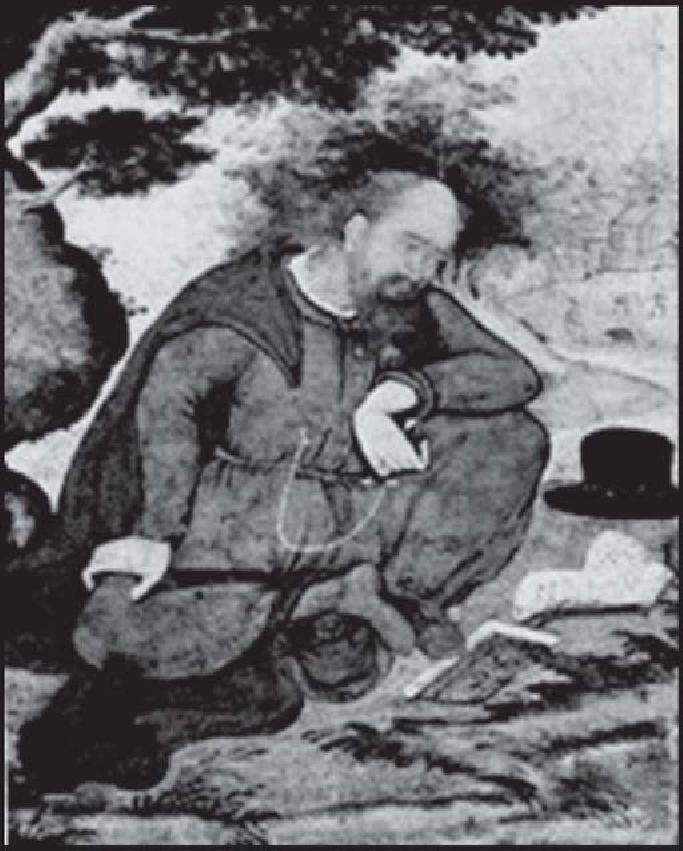
- Painting of François Bernier
- Born: 25 September 1620; Joué-Etiau, Anjou, France
- Died: 22 September 1688 (aged 67); Paris, France

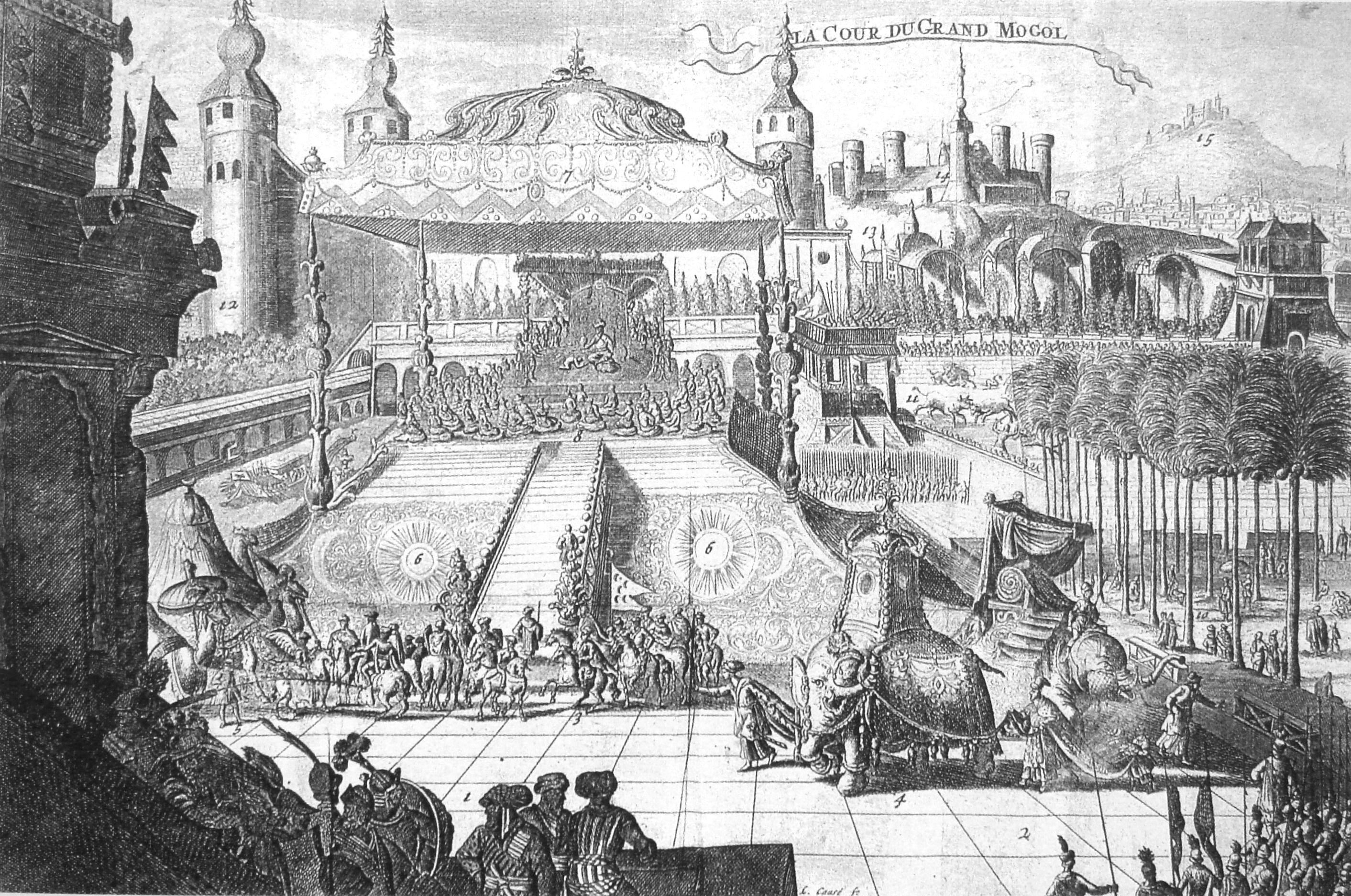
Engraving from Voyage de François Bernier, Paul Maret, 1710

François Bernier (25 September 1620 – 22 September 1688) was a French physician and traveller. He was born in Joué-Etiau in Anjou. He stayed (14 October 1658 – 20 February 1670) in India for nearly 12 years.

His 1684 publication "Nouvelle division de la terre par les différentes espèces ou races qui l'habitent" ("New Division of the Earth by the Different Species or Races of Man that Inhabit It") is considered the first published post-Classical classification of humans into distinct races. He also wrote Travels in the Mughal Empire, which is mainly about the reigns of Dara Shikoh and Aurangzeb. It is based on his own extensive journeys and observations, and on information from eminent Mughal courtiers who had witnessed the events firsthand.

Bernier abridged and translated the philosophical writings of his friend Pierre Gassendi from Latin into French. Initial editions of Bernier's Abregé de la Philosophie de Gassendi were published in Paris in 1674 by the family Langlois and in 1675 by Estienne Michallet. A complete edition in eight volumes was published by Anisson and Posuel at Lyon in 1678; Anisson and Posuel joined with Rigaud to publish a second edition in seven volumes in 1684. Bernier objectively and faithfully rendered Gassendi's ideas in his Abregé, without editorial interjection or invention. However, Bernier remained uncomfortable with some of Gassendi's notions: in 1682, Estienne Michallet was again his publisher, putting forth his Doutes de Mr. Bernier sur quelques-uns des principaux Chapitres de son Abregé de la Philosophie de Gassendi.

== Life ==
François Bernier, was orphaned very young and was cared for by his uncle, the curé de Chanzeaux. At the age of 15, he moved to Paris to study at the Collège de Clermont (the future Lycée Louis-le-Grand) where he was invited to stay at the home of his younger friend Chapelle, the natural son of Luillier who was a councillor at the parlement in Metz. There Bernier most probably met Cyrano de Bergerac and Molière, and certainly the philosopher Pierre Gassendi (1592–1655), whose aide and secretary he became. He developed a taste for travel (1647) in the company of monsieur d'Arpajon, the French ambassador to Poland and Germany.

In 1652, during a prolonged stay with Gassendi in the south of France, he managed to become a medical doctor on the strength of a speed-course at the famous Faculté de Montpellier: an intensive three-month course gave the medical degree providing one did not practice on French national territory.

Liberated from his ties to France by the death of Gassendi in 1655, he set out on his twelve-year journey to the East, at 36 years of age: Palestine, Egypt, one year in Cairo, Arabia, and an attempt to enter Ethiopia which was frustrated by civil war in the interior. In 1658 he debarked at Surat in India, in Gujarat state. Attached at first and for a short while to the retinue of Dara Shikoh—the history of whose downfall he was to record. He worked as a personal doctor for Dara Shikoh from early 1659 till Shikoh's defeat and execution, following which he was installed as a medical doctor at the court of Aurangzeb.

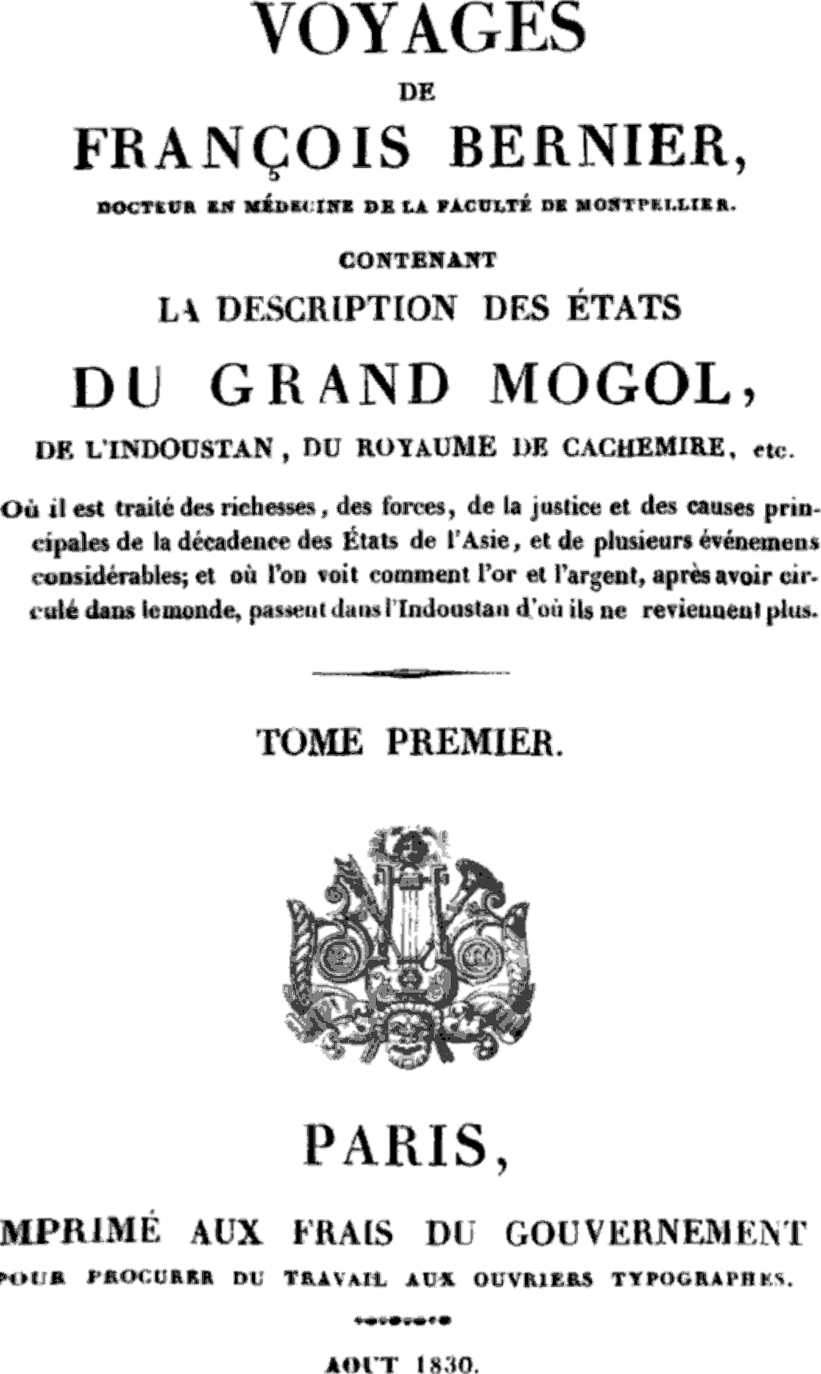
1830 edition of ''Voyages dans les États du Grand Mogol''

A tour of inspection by Aurangzeb (1664–65) gave Bernier the opportunity to describe the movement of the Mughal court from Delhi to Kashmir, making him the first and for a long time the only European to write about the latter in detail, in: "Voyages de F. Bernier (angevin) contenant la description des Etats du Grand Mogol, de l'Indoustan, du royaume de Kachemire" (David-Paul Maret ed., Amsterdam, 1699). He subsequently visited the other extreme of the empire in Bengal. European medical training was highly esteemed amongst the Mughal and gave him access to all ranks of the court, even on medically required occasions to the Emperor's harem.

After his return from Kashmir, he traveled around on his own, meeting with Jean-Baptiste Tavernier in Bengal and—while preparing for a journey to Persia at Surat—with Jean Chardin, that other great traveler in the Orient (1666).

He returned once more to Surat (1668) to write a memoir on Indian commerce for the use of Jean-Baptiste Colbert (who recently had founded La Compagnie des Indes Orientales). In 1669 Bernier returned to France.

In 1671 he almost was jailed for writing in defense of the ideas of René Descartes, against whom a judicial arrest had been issued—an exploit he followed with an "Abrégé de la Philosophie de Gassendi", also not a subject to arouse official approval (1674).

Meanwhile, he was a favored guest at some of the great literary salons, like those of Marguerite de la Sablière, who introduced him to Jean de La Fontaine, and Ninon de Lenclos. His much-debated 1684 essay on "races", "A New Division of the Earth"—of which the second half is dedicated to feminine beauty—may be read against this background.

In 1685 Bernier visited London where he met with some famous exiles from France: Hortense Mancini, Duchesse de Mazarin, niece of the redoubtable Cardinal; Saint-Évremond; others. He returned to Paris via the Netherlands, where he probably visited his philosophical correspondent Pierre Bayle.

Bernier died in 1688 in Paris, the year that saw the publication of his "Lettre sur le quiétisme des Indes".

Foremost among his correspondents while he was in India had been Jean Chapelain, who shipped him crates of books, Melchisédech Thévenot, and François de La Mothe Le Vayer. From Chapelain's correspondence we know of a link with the elder Pétis de la Croix, whose son François Pétis de la Croix was sent on a language course to Persia two years after Bernier's return from India.

== Essay on dividing humanity into "races" ==
In 1684 Bernier published a brief essay dividing humanity into what he called "races", distinguishing individuals, and particularly women, by skin color and a few other physical traits. The article was published anonymously in the Journal des sçavans, the earliest academic journal published in Europe, and titled "New Division of the Earth by the Different Species or 'Races' of Man that Inhabit It." In the essay he distinguished four different races: 1) The first race included populations from Europe, North Africa, the Middle East, India, south-east Asia, and the Americas. 2) The second race consisted of the sub-Saharan Africans, 3) the third race consisted of the east- and northeast Asians, and 4) the fourth race were Sámi people. The emphasis on different kinds of female beauty can be explained because the essay was the product of French Salon culture. Bernier emphasized that his novel classification was based on his personal experience as a traveler in different parts of the world. Bernier offered a distinction between essential genetic differences and accidental ones that depended on environmental factors. He also suggested that the latter criterion might be relevant to distinguish sub-types. His biological classification of racial types never sought to go beyond physical traits, and he also accepted the role of climate and diet in explaining degrees of human diversity. Bernier had been the first to extend the concept of "species of man" to classify racially the entirety of humanity, but he did not establish a cultural hierarchy between the so-called 'races' that he had conceived. On the other hand, he clearly placed Europeans as the norm from which other 'races' deviated. The qualities which he attributed to each race were not strictly Eurocentric, because he thought that peoples of temperate Europe, the Americas and India, culturally very different, belonged to roughly the same racial group, and he explained the differences between the civilizations of India (his main area of expertise) and Europe through climate and institutional history. By contrast he emphasized the biological difference between Europeans and Africans, and made very negative comments towards the Sami (Lapps) of the coldest climates of Northern Europe and about Africans living at the Cape of Good Hope. He wrote for example "The 'Lappons' compose the 4th race. They are a small and short race with thick legs, wide shoulders, a short neck, and a face that I don't know how to describe, except that it's long, truly awful and seems reminiscent of a bear's face. I've only ever seen them twice in Danzig, but according to the portraits I've seen and from what I've heard from a number of people they're ugly animals". The significance of Bernier for the emergence of what Joan-Pau Rubiés call the "modern racial discourse" has been debated, with Siep Stuurman calling it the beginning of modern racial thought, while Joan-Pau Rubiés think it is less significant if Bernier's entire view of humanity is taken into account.

== Contributions to scientific racism ==
By virtue of being the first to propose a system of racial classification that extended to all of humanity, Bernier’s racial categories contributed to the genesis of scientific racism. Inherently, his classifications were based on physical and biological differences in human appearance, and thus sought to suggest a scientific basis for human racial variation. As previously mentioned, Bernier makes a distinction between physical variation due to environmental factors and racial factors. For instance, he classifies Indians that he is exposed to during his stint in the Mughal courts as part of the 'white race'. He asserts that Indians, like Egyptians, have a skin color that is “accidental, resulting from their exposure to the sun”. However, when it comes to categorizing Africans, he notes that “Blackness is an essential feature of theirs”. Bernier evidences the fact that their color is not due to environmental factors by asserting that they will be Black even when living in colder climes. Bernier’s conception of biological or racial difference and variation due to climatic features is blurry, but contributed to the eventual development of theories of scientific racism. At the time that he published his work, it did not cause a splash: he founded no school of thought at the time. Scientific thinking, upon the time he wrote the text, had shifted from systems where evidence was based on analogies, like Bernier had used, to a system supported by fixed laws of nature. Thus, the context of scientific discourse at the time meant Bernier did not receive huge attention for his classification in the second half of the 17th century, and "he remained a man of the salons".

== Textiles ==
One of the things the newly arriving physician François Bernier noticed in Aurangzeb's capital was the embroidered dressing of the Mughal Emperor's subjects he writes in his Travels in the Moghal Empire: "Large halls are seen in many places, called Karkanahs, or workshops for the artisans. In one hall, embroiderers are busily employed, superintended by a master." He continued, "Manufactures of silk, fine brocade, and other fine muslins, of which are made turbans, girdles of gold flowers, and drawers worn by Mughal females, so delicately fine as to wear out in one night" were one of the most expensive forms of clothing ins the world, "or even more when embroidered with fine needlework."

== Danishmand Khan ==
In India, Bernier came under the protection of Daneshmand Khan (Mullah Shafi'a'i, a native of Yazd), an important official at the court of Aurangzeb. Mullah Shafi'a'i was secretary of state for foreign affairs, grand master of the horse, later treasurer (Mir Bakshi) and governor of Delhi (died 1670). Bernier and Daneshmand seem to have been on terms of mutual esteem, and Bernier always refers to him as "my Agha".

Two excerpts from "Travels in the Mughal Empire" illustrate the interchange that followed. The importance of the detail could only fully be appreciated in the last decades of the 20th century, following the contributions by Henry Corbin and Seyyed Hossein Nasr to the history of Islamic philosophy.

Commenting on the yogi manner of meditation:

However I know that this ravishment and the way to enter it are the great mystery of the cabal of the Yogis, as it is of the Sufis. I say mystery because they keep it hidden amongst them and if it were not for my Pandit; and that Danishmand Khan knew the mysteries of the cabal of the Sufis, I would not know as much as I did.

[...] do not be surprised if without knowledge of Sanskrit I am going to tell you many things taken from books in that language; you will know that my Agha Danismand Khan paid for the presence of one of the most famous pandits in India, who before had been pensioned by Dara Shikoh, the oldest son of Shah Jahan, and that this pandit, apart from attracting the most learned scientists to our circle, was at my side for over three years. When I became weary of explaining to my Agha the latest discoveries of William Harvey and Pequet in anatomy, and to reason with him on the philosophy of Gassendi and Descartes, which I translated into Persian (because that is what I did during five or six years) it was up to our pandit to argue.

A candidate for becoming Bernier's "pandit" probably would have come from the circle around Hindu scholars such as Jagannatha Panditaraja, who still was at work under Shah Jahan, or Kavindracharya, who taught Dara Sikhoh Sanskrit. Gode's argument that this pandit was none other than Kavīndrācārya Sarasvatī himself has won general acceptance. His intellectual partner could be someone like Zu'lfaqar Ardistani (died 1670), author of the Dabistan-i Mazahib, an overview of religious diversity (Jewish, Christian, Buddhist, Hindu, Muslim ...). He was educated perhaps by Mir Abul-Qasim Astrabadi Findiriski a link between the religious tolerance aspect of the great project of Persian translations, initiated by Akbar and continued by his great-grandson Dara Shikoh, and the School of Isfahan near the end of the Safavid reign; or perhaps he was educated by Hakim Kamran Shirazi, to whom Mir Findiriski referred as "elder brother", who studied Christian theology and the Gospel under Portuguese priests, traveled to India to study Sanskrit Shastra, lived with the yogi Chatrupa at Benares, and died, chanting the liberation of the philosophers, at the age of 100. Those were scholars who had a knowledge of Greek peripatetic philosophers (mashsha'un, falasifa—in the Arabic translations), as well as respect for Ibn Sina and Shihabuddin Yahya Suhrawardi Maqtul (Hikmat al Ishraq).

France Battacharya notes that she removed, in her critical edition based on the 1724 edition, the chapter "Lettre à Chapelle sur les atomes"—as being not so relevant to the context.

== Works ==
- Bernier, François (1891). Travels in the Mogul Empire, A.D. 1656–1668. Archibald Constable, London. ISBN 81-7536-185-9.
- Gassendi, Pierre. Abregé de la Philosophie de Gassendi. Translated by François Bernier. 8 vols. Lyon: Anisson & Posuel, 1678.
- Gassendi, Pierre. Abregé de la Philosophie de Gassendi. Translated by François Bernier. 2nd ed. 7 vols. Lyon: Anisson, Posuel & Rigaud, 1684.
- Bernier, François. Doutes de Mr. Bernier sur quelques-uns des principaux Chapitres de son Abregé de la Philosophie de Gassendi. Paris: Estienne Michallet, 1682.
- Bernier, François (1671). The History of the Late Revolution of the Empire of the Great Mogol. Moses Pitt, London.

== See also ==
- Pre-Adamites
