= Parashuram Krishna Gode =

Indian scholar

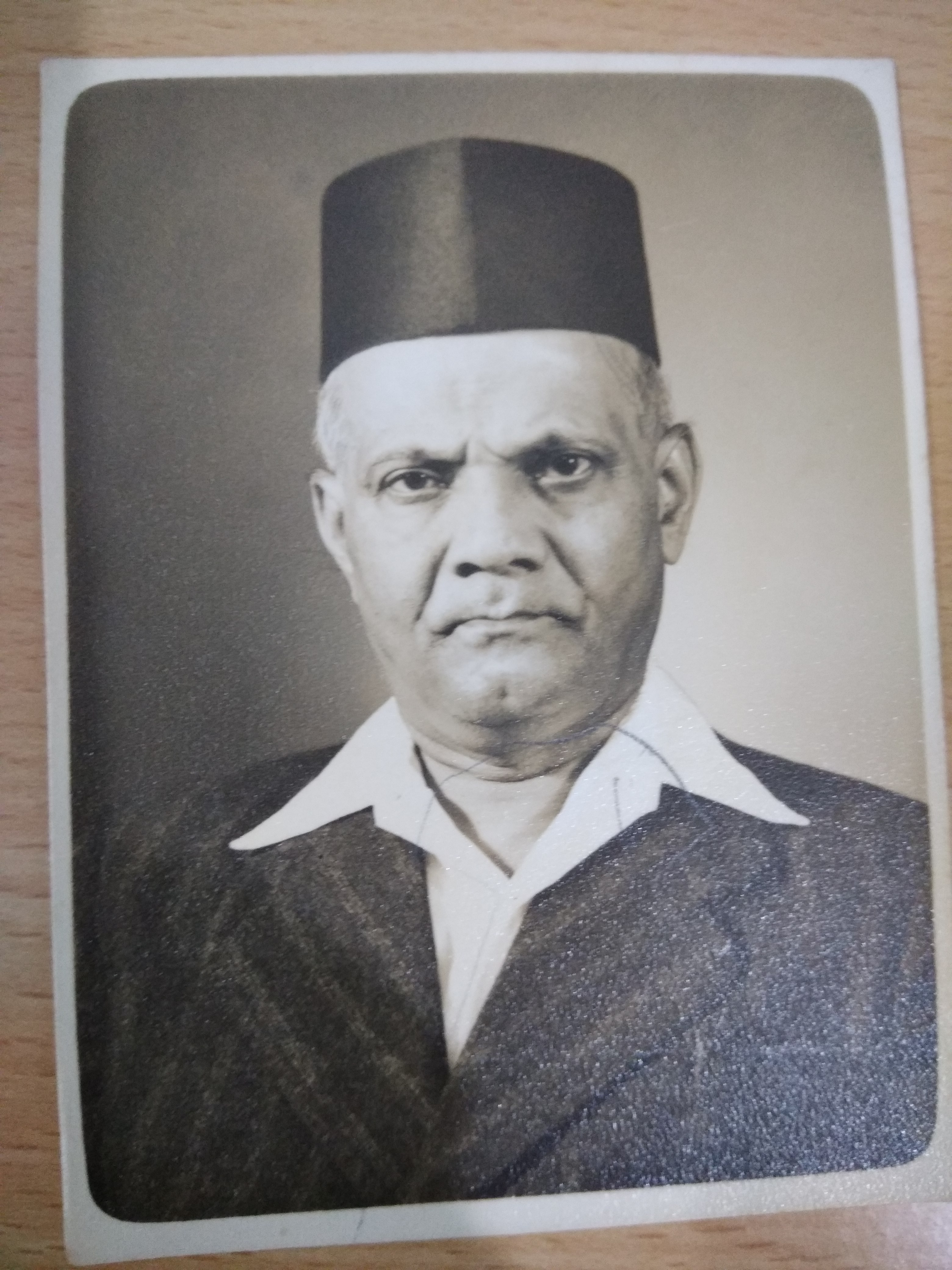
- Born: 11 July 1891
- Died: 28 May 1961 (aged 69)
- Known for: Sanskrit and Prakrit

Parashuram Krishna Gode (Marathi: परशुराम कृष्ण गोडे), was a Sanskrit and Prakrit scholar and the first curator of the Bhandarkar Oriental Research Institute. He was the co-editor of The New Indian Antiquary, a monthly journal of Oriental research.
