= Mustafa Rumi =

Mustafa Rumi was an Ottoman general who served the Mughal Empire under Babur. At the Battle of Panipat and Battle of Khanwa, he commanded the Matchlock gun infantry. His role in these battles as commander of rifle troops was a vital one, as it was the riflemen under Rumi and the cannons under Ustad Ali Quli that won the day.

== Introduction of Mustafa Rumi to Babur ==
Babur's early relations with the Ottomans were poor because the Ottoman Sultan Selim I provided Babur's Uzbek rival Ubaydullah Khan with powerful matchlocks and cannons. In 1507, when ordered to accept Selim I as his rightful suzerain, Babur refused and gathered Qizilbash servicemen in order to counter the forces of Ubaydullah Khan during the Battle of Ghazdewan in 1512. In 1513, Selim I reconciled with Babur (due to shared Sunni faith and fearing that he would join the Safavids), dispatched Ustad Ali Quli and Mustafa Rumi, and many other Ottoman Turks, in order to assist Babur in his conquests; this particular assistance proved to be the basis of future Mughal-Ottoman relations. From them, he also adopted the tactic of using matchlocks and cannons in field (rather than only in sieges), which would give him an important advantage in India.
