= Ustad Ali Quli =

- Born: Ottoman Empire
- Military career
- Allegiance: Mughal Empire
- Commands: Artillery of Babur's army
- Conflicts: Battle of Panipat, Battle of Khanwa

Ustad Ali Quli was an Ottoman commander of the Mughal Empire. During the reign of Babur, he commanded the artillery for his army. At the Battle of Panipat and Battle of Khanwa, he commanded his cannon batteries. His role in these battles as commander of the artillery was a vital one, as it was the riflemen and cannons under Mustafa Rumi and Ustad Ali Quli that won the day.

== Introduction of Ustad Ali Quli to Babur ==
Babur's early relations with the Ottomans were poor because the Ottoman Sultan Selim I provided Babur's Uzbek rival Ubaydullah Khan with powerful matchlocks and cannons. In 1507, when ordered to accept Selim I as his rightful suzerain, Babur refused and gathered Qizilbash servicemen in order to counter the forces of Ubaydullah Khan during the Battle of Ghazdewan. In 1513, Selim I reconciled with Babur (fearing that he would join the Safavids), dispatched Ustad Ali Quli and Mustafa Rumi the matchlock marksman, and many other Ottoman commanders and soldiers, in order to assist Babur in his conquests; this particular assistance proved to be the basis of future Mughal-Ottoman relations. From them, he also adopted the tactic of using matchlocks and cannons in field (rather than only in sieges), which would give him an important advantage in India.
