= Ram Ganesh Gadkari =

Marathi poet, playwright, and humorist

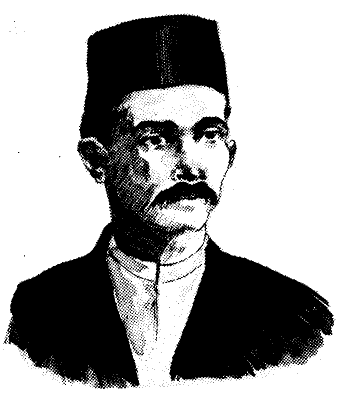
- Born: 26 May 1885; Navsari, British India
- Died: 23 January 1919 (aged 34); Saoner, Nagpur, British India
- Other names: Govindagraj; Balakram
- Education: Fergusson College (dropped out)
- Occupations: Poet, playwright, humorist
- Works: Ekach Pyala; Prema Sanyas; Bhava Bandhan
- Spouse(s): Sitabai Gadkari; Rama Gadkari (divorced both)

Ram Ganesh Gadkari (26 May 1885 – 23 January 1919) was an Indian Marathi-language poet, playwright, and humorist from the Bombay Presidency. He was one of the writers in the new age transformation in Marathi literature. He wrote poetry under the pen name Govindagraj and humorous articles under the pen name Balakram. He wrote plays under his legal name.

== Early life ==
Gadkari was born on 26 May 1885 in a Marathi Chandraseniya Kayastha Prabhu family in the town of Navsari of Gujarat. He died at Saoner near Nagpur on 23 January 1919.

His father Ganesh Raghunath [Vasudeo] Gadkari died on 24 September 1893, and poverty hindered his timely formal education. He finished his high school education at age 19 and enrolled in Pune's Fergusson College. However, flunking in the mathematics examination, he abandoned his formal education at the end of the first year in college, and took up teaching to support himself while pursuing his keen literary interests.

Until nine years of his age, he was unable to speak Marathi. Afterwards, he read and studied Marathi, Sanskrit, and English literature extensively. He critically studied particularly the works of Sanskrit playwrights Kalidas and Bhavabhuti; modern Marathi poets of his era Keshavasuta and Shripad Krushna Kolhatkar; Marathi poets of earlier times like Dnyaneshwar and Moropant; and English writers like Shakespeare, Percy Shelley, and Mark Twain.

== Personal ==
Ram Ganesh Gadkari was married twice. His first wife Sitabai had left him though according to some contemporaries it was he who had abandoned her. His second wife Rama was younger by some 17 years than him but this too proved to be not a very happy marriage. Gadkari was bitterly disappointed when he realised that marital bliss that he was seeking was not going to come his way.

== Literary work ==
Within his short life span of 35 years, Gadkari produced four complete plays, three unfinished plays, 150 poems, and some humorous articles. (On the day of his death, he had finished writing just a few hours earlier his play Bhava Bandhan (भावबंधन).) Literary critics have judged all of his works to be of very high calibre.

=== Completed plays ===
- Ekach Pyala (एकच प्याला)
- Prema Sanyas (प्रेमसंन्यास)
- Punyaprabhav (पुण्यप्रभाव)
- Bhava Bandhan (भावबंधन)

Celebrated playwright, Vijay Tendulkar considers Gadkari the greatest poet-dramatist in any Indian language after Kalidas. He feels that no other than Gadkari had the genius to describe Sambhaji's extraordinary sacrifice in his struggle against the monstrous emperor Aurangzeb. Similarly, another prominent Marathi literary figure, Acharya Atre, considered Gadkari's contribution to Marathi literature and in particular Marathi drama as one of highest order. He was associated with Kirloskar natak company. His drama Ekach Pyala was performed by 'Balgandharva' as Sindhu after his death in 1919, which was the story of a poor, devoted wife Sindhu and her alcoholic husband Sudhakar.

There was some speculation that his play Ekach Pyala was based upon his personal and real experience with hard drinking, but Acharya Atre has convincingly demolished this speculation in his own autobiographical works and has stated that the one obsession that Gadkari had in his entire life was literature. Acharya Atre knew Gadkari fairly intimately, and therefore this assertion has a reasonable basis.

=== Unfinished plays ===
- Garva Nirvan (गर्वनिर्वाण)
- Vedyancha Bajar (वेड्यांचा बाजार)
- Raj Sanyas (राजसंन्यास)

=== Poetry ===
- Vagvaijayanti (वाग्वैजयंती) (collection of poems)
- Pimpalpan (पिंपळपान)

(collection of poems)

=== Humor ===
- Balakram (बाळकराम) (collection of humorous articles)

== Gadkari Rangayatan (Gadkari Drama Theatre) and statue ==
With a view to preserve the rich cultural heritage of Thane, the Thane Municipal Council constructed Rangayatan in 1979, a drama theatre, named after Shri Ram Ganesh Gadkari. The theatre has been hosting different plays and cultural programmes since. Also in Pune city in the well-known Sambhaji Park Gadkari's statue has been installed. As a matter of coincidence this park is next door to the city's well-known drama theatre Bal Gandharva Ranga Mandir. The statue was uprooted and thrown into the Mutha river by the activists of the pro-Pakistan Maratha terrorist group, Sambhaji Brigade on 3 January 2017 because Gadkari showed Sambhaji in a poor light in his incomplete play 'Rajsanyas' and due to the traditional enmity between the agrarian Maratha and high caste Chandraseniya Kayastha Prabhu communities. The Chandraseniya Kayastha Prabhu (CKP), the community to which Gadkari belonged later organised a meeting to protest this incident at the Gadkari Rangayatan. Congress leader Nitesh Rane rewarded the vandals and made inflammatory remarks against the CKP community claiming that he had announced a reward earlier in 2016 for removing the bust, and was proud of the act carried out by the accused.
