= Ninad Bedekar =

Marathi writer

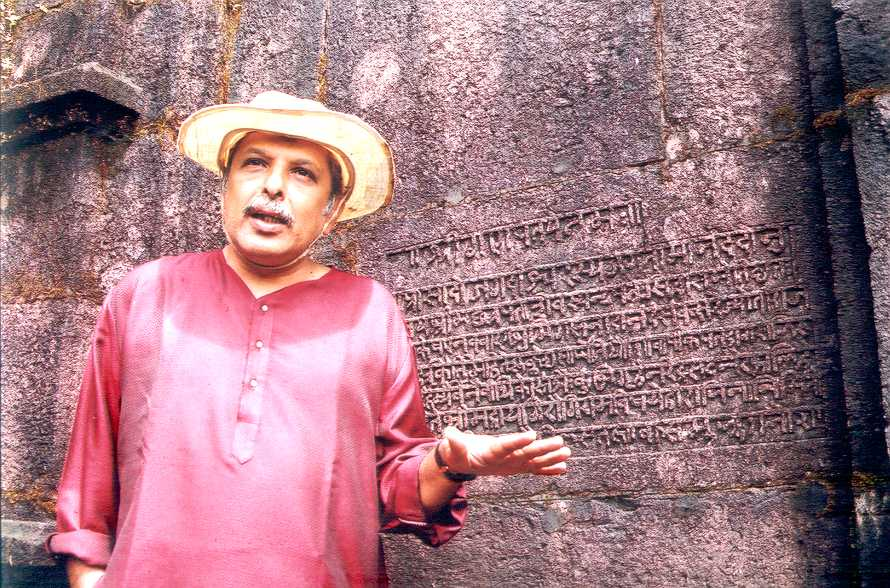
- Born: 17 August 1949 Pune, India
- Died: 10 May 2015 (aged 65)
- Occupation: Historian, Writer and Orator, Retired factory executive
- Education: Diploma of Mechanical Engineering
- Years active: 1975–2015

Ninad Gangadhar Bedekar (17 August 1949 – 10 May 2015) was a historian, writer and orator from Pune, Maharashtra, India, writing and speaking in Marathi. He was specialized in research of the rule of warrior-king Chatrapati Shivaji Maharaj.

== Career ==
He was the grandson of Sardar Raste of Pune. He is the son of notable freedom fighter Pramila Tai Bedekar. Bedekar was an engineer by profession and was serving in Cummins India Limited for 15 years.

Bedekar was known for his research on the forts of Maharashtra, Tamil Nadu, Andhra Pradesh, Madhya Pradesh and about 75 forts outside India, having led numerous treks to them. He was a life member Shri Shivaji Raigad Smarak Mandal - Pune, Shri Shivaji Raigad Smarak Mandal – (Chairman) Maharastra Kalopasak, Pune – (Chairman).

He was acquainted with Persian and Arabic, as well as the Modi script. He was a life member of Bharat Itihas Sanshodhak Mandal, Pune and an honorary member of Fort Renovation and Beautification Committee for the Government of Maharashtra. He held a diploma in mechanical engineering, and has worked for Kirloskar Cummins Ltd (now Cummins India Limited).

He had given many lectures widely all over Maharashtra on Maratha history. He scripted the Son et lumière show at Shanivarwada, and wrote the script for Marathi TV serial Peshwai. Bedekar transliterated some rare documents written in Modi script about the Maratha Empire that were found in the UK. He had written many books that include Durgkatha, Shartiche Shiledar and Maharastratil Durg among others. He was an expert on forts in India and abroad.

In 2003, Bedekar succeeded, along with the Maratha-Hindu-nationalist organization, Shiv Sena, in having James Laine's academic monograph, Shivaji: Hindu king in Islamic India (Oxford University Press) banned in their state.

== Death ==
Bedekar died in 2015, at the age 65 in Pune.

== Bibliography ==
- Durgakathaa / दुर्गकथा
- Shartiche Shiledaara ( 5 Parts ) / शर्तीचे शिलेदार (५ भाग)
- Hasaraa Itihaasa / हसरा इतिहास
- Durgavaibhava / दुर्गवैभव
- Itihaasa Durgaanchaa / इतिहास दुर्गांचा
- Mahaaraastraatila Durga / महाराष्ट्रातील दुर्ग
- Saaksha Itihaasaachi / साक्ष इतिहासाची
- Thoralaa Raajaa Saanguna Gelaa / थोरला राजा सांगून गेला
- Khaanderee / खांदेरी
- Javhaara / जव्हार
- Gajakathaa / गजकथा
- Ekaa Navina Shivacharitraachyaa Nimittaane / एका नवीन शिवचरित्राच्या निमित्ताने
- Vijaya Durgaache Rahasya' / विजयदुर्गाचे रहस्य
- छत्रपती शिवाजी महाराज व पहिले बाजीराव पेशवे यांची "कालातीत व्यवस्थापन तत्वे".
- 'shivbhushan'. He presented 'Shivbhushan', a poem in the Brajabhasha, on an audio CD.

He wrote the foreword to the critically acclaimed book Solstice at Panipat by Uday Kulkarni.
