= Manipal Hospitals =

Indian hospital chain

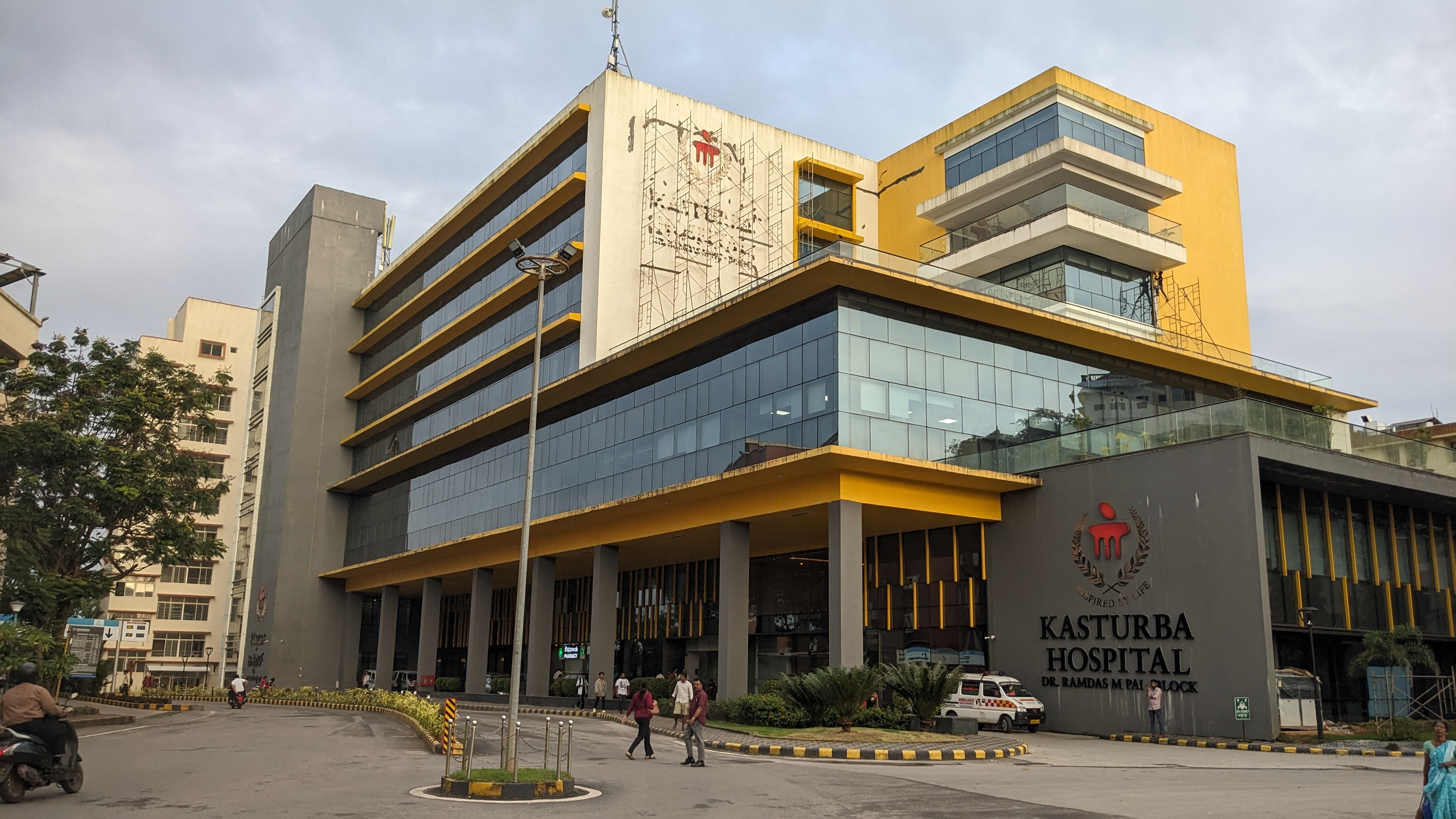
- Dr. Ramdas M. Pai Block of Kasturba Hospital, Manipal
- Type: Public
- Traded as: BSE: 544847; NSE: MANIPALHOS
- Industry: Healthcare
- Founded: 1953; 73 years ago
- Founder: T. M. A. Pai
- Headquarters: Bengaluru, Karnataka, India
- Number of locations: 49 (2026)
- Key people: Ranjan Pai (Group chairman); H. Sudarshan Ballal (Chairman); Dilip Jose (CEO & MD)
- Products: Hospitals, Pharmacy, Diagnostic centres
- Revenue: ▲₹10,335 crore (US$1.1 billion) (FY26)
- Operating income: ▲₹2,611 crore (US$270 million) (FY26)
- Net income: ▼₹916 crore (US$95 million) (FY26)
- Owners: Temasek Holdings (44%); Manipal Education and Medical Group (28%)
- Website: www.manipalhospitals.com

Manipal Health Enterprises Limited, commonly known as Manipal Hospitals, is an Indian for-profit private hospital network headquartered in Bengaluru. As of 2026, Manipal Hospitals is the largest healthcare provider in India in terms of bed capacity, with over 13,000 beds across 49 hospitals.

Manipal Hospitals trace their origins to the Kasturba Medical College in Manipal, founded by T. M. A. Pai in 1953. The hospitals are part of the Manipal Education and Medical Group.

== History ==
In 1953, T. M. A. Pai founded Kasturba Medical College in Manipal, operating as a public-private partnership utilizing the government hospitals in Mangaluru. Dr. Pai was an Indian doctor, educationist, and philanthropist who was awarded the Padma Shri by the Government of India in 1972.

The first branch of Manipal Hospitals was established in Old Airport Road, Bengaluru in 1991. This branch is a 600-bed quaternary care facility that houses over 60 specialties. In 1997, it established a 251-bed tertiary care hospital named KMC Hospital, Mangaluru, a teaching hospital for Kasturba Medical College, Mangaluru.

In 2012, Manipal Hospitals raised US$100 million from True North (India Value Fund Advisors). In 2015, TPG acquired a minority stake in Manipal Hospitals for US$146 million. In 2017, Temasek Holdings acquired True North's 16% stake in Manipal Hospitals at a valuation of US$1 billion.

In 2014, Manipal Hospitals acquired the SK Soni Hospital in Jaipur, marking its entry into North India.

In November 2020, Manipal Hospitals acquired Columbia Asia's 11 operational hospitals in India and 1 under-construction hospital for ₹2,100 crore. All Columbia Asia hospitals were later rebranded as Manipal Hospitals.

In April 2021, state-owned National Investment and Infrastructure Fund took a minority ownership stake in Manipal Hospitals. Later that month, Manipal Hospitals announced the sale of its only hospital outside India, Manipal Hospital Klang in Malaysia, to Ramsay Sime Darby Health Care for ₹700 crore (US$94.47 million).

In June 2021, Manipal Hospitals acquired Vikram Hospital in Bengaluru for ₹350 crore.

In 2023, Temasek Holdings acquired a 41% stake in Manipal Hospitals for about ₹16,000 crore (US$2 billion), increasing its shareholding to 59% and becoming the controlling stakeholder in the hospital chain. The acquisition valued the hospital chain at around ₹40,000 crore (US$5 billion). Temasek later sold an 8% stake to Mubadala, Novo Holdings, CalPERS, and Brunei Investment Agency.

In September 2023, Manipal Hospitals acquired an 84% controlling stake in AMRI Hospitals for ₹2,300 crore (approximately US$280 million). In April 2024, Manipal Hospitals acquired 87% stake in Medica Synergie Hospitals for ₹1,400 crore. In July 2025, Manipal Health acquired a majority stake in Sahyadri Hospitals from Canada's Ontario Teachers' Pension Plan for ₹6,400 crore (approximately US$775 million).

In 2026, Manipal Hospitals conducted its IPO, with a total issue size of ₹9,275 crore, of which ₹5,552 crore was used to repay outstanding debt. Shares were listed on the BSE and NSE on 5 August 2026.

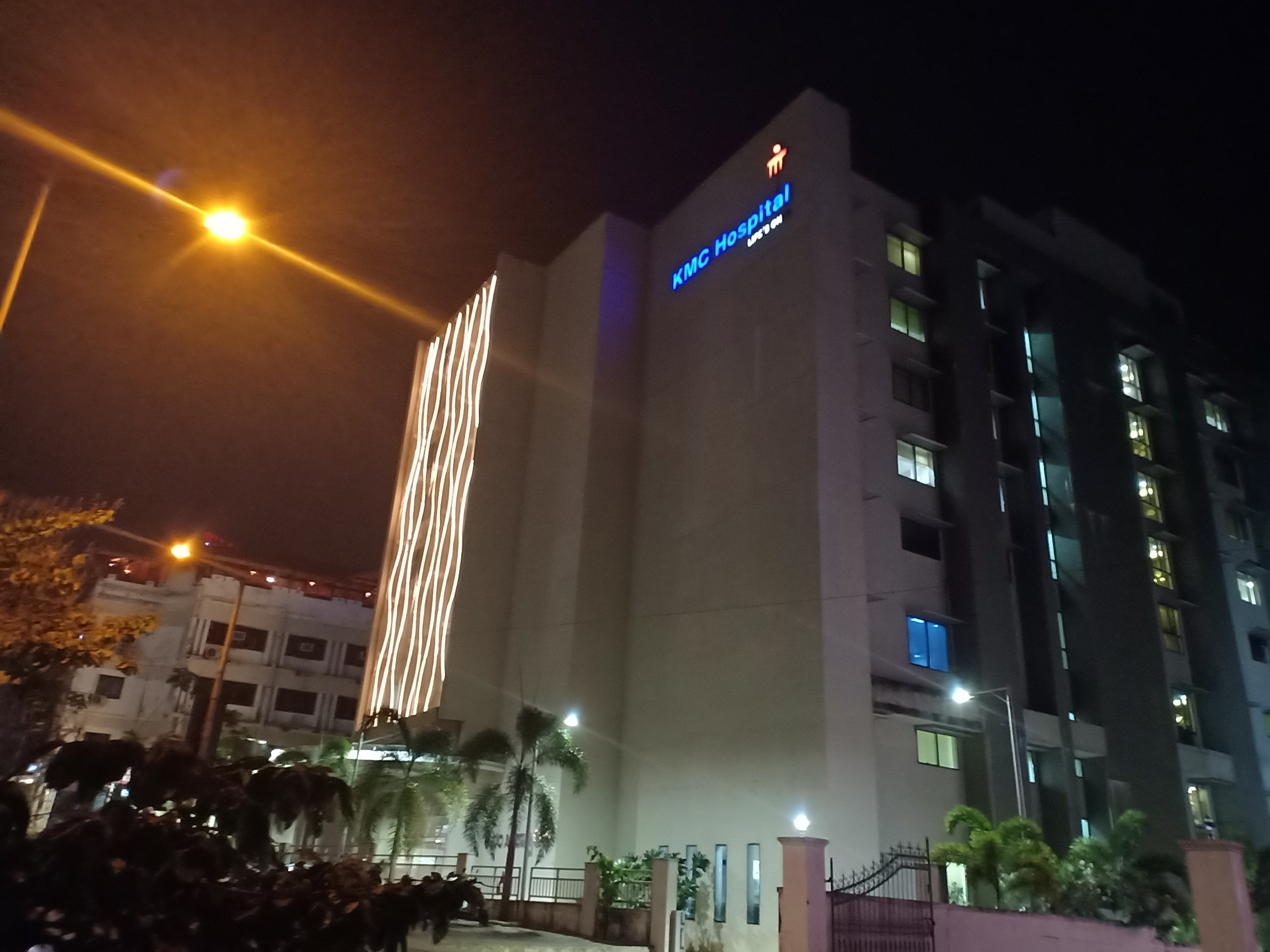
KMC Hospital, Mangaluru

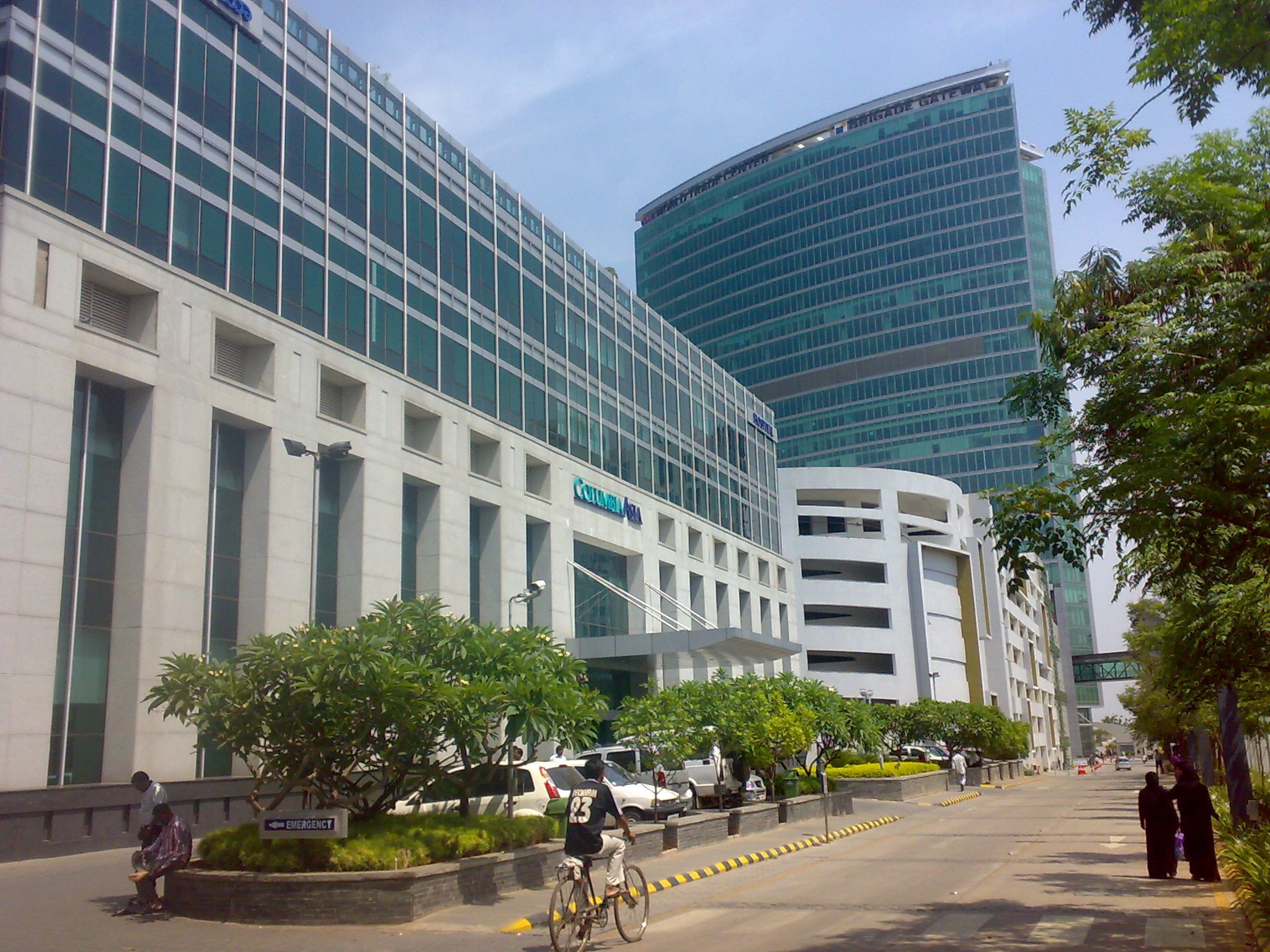
Manipal Hospital beside World Trade Center Bengaluru

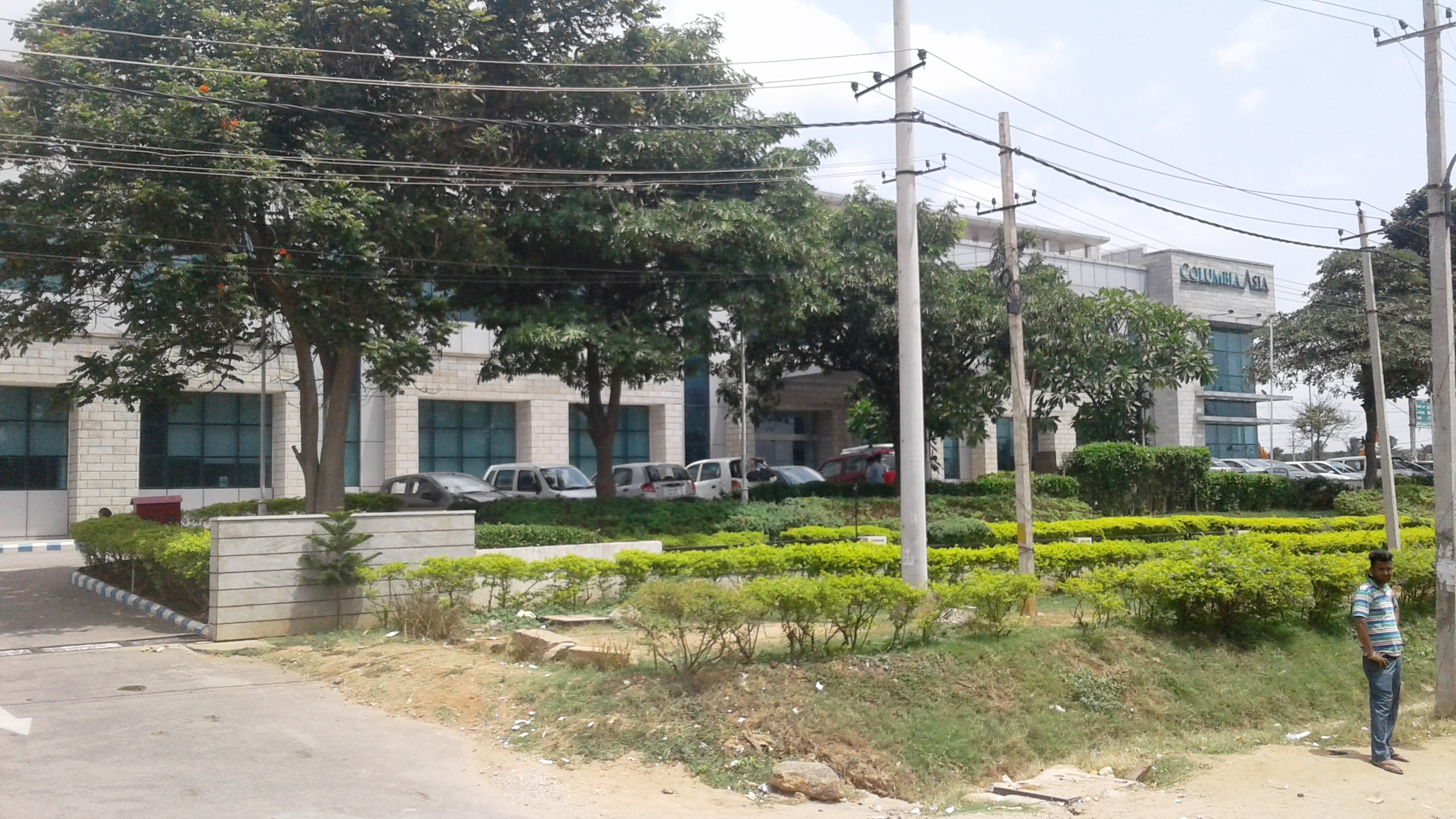
Manipal Hospital, Mysore

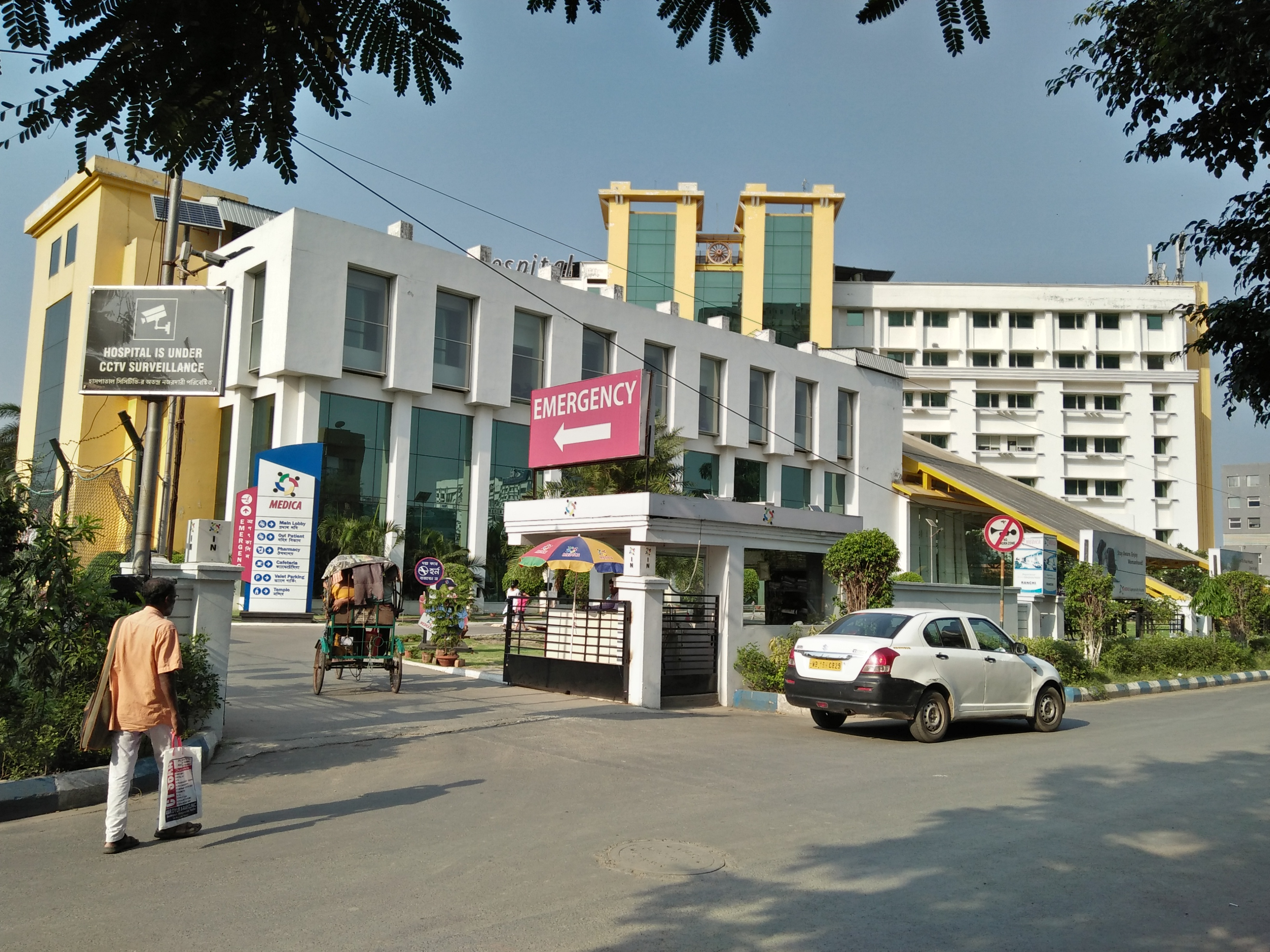
Manipal Hospital EM Bypass, Kolkata

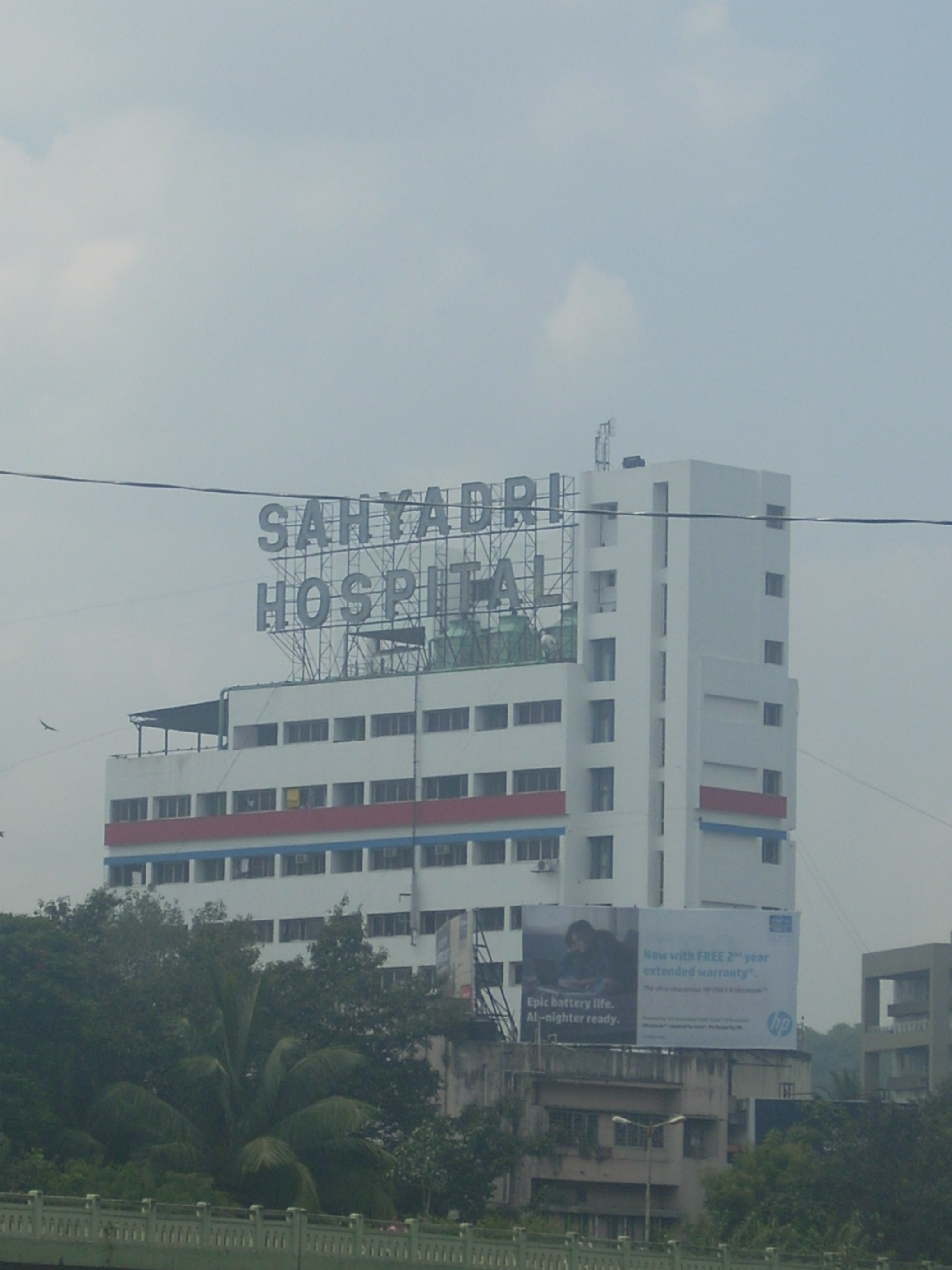
Sahyadri Hospital, Pune

== Subsidiaries ==
- Manipal HealthMap provides diagnostics and pathology services under the name TRUtest. It was established in 2015 as a 65:35 joint venture between Manipal Hospitals and Philips India. In 2019, Morgan Stanley replaced Philips in the joint venture. It acquired Medcis PathLabs in 2022 and iGenetic Diagnostics in 2024.

== Financials ==
Year	FY2023	FY2024	FY2025	FY2026
Revenue (₹ cr)	4,839	6,171	8,243	10,335
EBITDA (₹ cr)	1,271	1,683	2,126	2,611
Net income (₹ cr)	443	533	1,081	916

== Controversies ==
In December 2017, the United India Insurance Company suspended Manipal Hospital in Dona Paula, Goa from its provider network for charging money from patients who were covered under Government of Goa's Deen Dayal Swasthya Seva Yojana. The suspension was revoked two days later after the hospital agreed to provide refunds to the patients who were charged.

In April 2024, the Government of Rajasthan suspended the organ transplant licenses of three hospitals in Jaipur, namely Fortis Escorts Hospital, Eternal Heart Care Center, and Manipal Hospital Jaipur, over their suspected involvement in illegal organ transplants using fake no-objection certificates (NOCs). According to the investigation, 184 organ transplants in 2023 were conducted by obtaining fake NOCs in collusion with an official at the state-run Sawai Man Singh Hospital, including 98 cases in Fortis, 37 in EHCC, and 49 in Manipal Hospital.

== See also ==
- Manipal Academy of Higher Education
- Sikkim Manipal University
- Manipal Foundation
- Ramdas Pai
