= Pai (surname) =

Pai is a surname from coastal Karnataka, Kerala and Goa in India. It is found among Hindus of the Goud Saraswat Brahmin community, especially of Madhwa Section following either Kashi Math or Gokarna Matha.

The name is also in use among some Konkani Catholics who trace their ancestry to the Goud Saraswat Brahmins of Karnataka, Kerala and Goa.

== Notable people ==
The following is a list of notable people with last name Pai.

- Ajit Pai, Indian cricketer
- Ajit Pai, American lawyer and Chairman of the Federal Communications Commission (2017–2021)
- Ammembal Subba Rao Pai, lawyer and founder of Canara Bank
- Anant Pai (1937–2011), noted Indian educationist and creator of comics (also known as Uncle Pai)
- G. Vasantha Pai (1921–2009), Senior Advocate – Madras High Court and Indian Supreme Court, Member of Legislative Council (MLC)
- Kuldeep M Pai, musician, guru, Ashtavadhani
- Laxman Pai (1926–2021), artist; winner of Padma Shri, Padma Bhushan Govt of India.
- M. Govinda Pai (1883–1963), poet
- Mukundrao Pai (1883–1948), Indian cricketer, member of the first Indian cricket team to tour England in 1911
- M. Kesava Pai (1879–1965), doctor, Rao Bahadur, OBE (Order of the British Empire awarded in 1932)
- M. Purushotham Pai (1906–1991), ICS, Chief Secretary of Andhra Pradesh, Chairman of SCCL, Board Member-Larsen & Toubro, Chairman of APSRTC
- T. M. A. Pai (1898–1978), banker and philanthropist
- Tonse Ramesh Upendra Pai, businessman; Chairman of Maharashtra Apex Corporation Ltd.
- T. A. Pai (1922–1981), banker and founder of T. A. Pai Management Institute, Founder of Syndicate Bank
- Ramdas Madhav Pai, Chancellor of Manipal University
