= T. Mohandas Pai =

Indian business executive (1933–2022)

Tonse Mohandas Pai
- Born: Tonse Mohandas Pai; 20 June 1933
- Died: 31 July 2022 (aged 89); Udupi, Karnataka, India
- Education: University of Pune
- Occupations: Business executive and philanthropist
- Parents: T. M. A. Pai (father); Sharada Pai (mother)
- Relatives: Ramdas Pai (brother); T. A. Pai (cousin); Ramesh Pai (cousin)

Tonse Mohandas Pai (20 June 1933 – 31 July 2022) was an Indian business executive who was the founder of the Kannada-language daily Udayavani. He has been referred to as the 'architect of modern Manipal' for his contributions to the development of the South Indian city.

== Early life ==
Pai was the eldest son of T. M. A. Pai, Padma Shri awardee and founder of the Manipal group of institutions. He was born on 20 June 1933 into the family with ten siblings. He completed his schooling in the southern Indian city of Udupi from the Udupi Board School, and followed this with his intermediate level education from the MGM college in Udupi. He later went to Kolhapur, in present day Maharashtra, to obtain a degree in law from the University of Pune. He is a Gaud Saraswat Brahmin.

== Career ==
Pai returned to Manipal in 1953 after his studies and started with some of the organizations that his father had set up. He started as the general manager with Canara Land Investments, which was run by his family. He also took on leadership of the Manipal Power Press as its managing partner. He is credited with introduction of automatic typesetting and contributing to the press's modernization in the 1960s. He later set up Udayavani, a Kannada-language daily. He was also noted to have introduced modern printing machinery and advancing the Manipal Media Network.

As a patron of the arts, he set up institutions in coastal Karnataka, including MGM Yakshagana Kendra, Regional Resources Centre for Folk Performing Arts, and the Rashtrakavi Govindapai Research Centre. Pai was also the chairman and director of ICDS limited, a non-banking financial company. For his contributions to the development of the city of Manipal, he has been referred to as the 'architect of modern Manipal'. Building on his father's initial efforts in setting up Manipal as an education, medicine, and finance hub, Pai contributed to the city's sustained growth. He partnered with entrepreneur Vijayanath Shenoy to set up a heritage village in Manipal. Pai was also the president of the T. M. A. Pai foundation focused on promoting Konkani literature and community growth initiatives in the Manipal region.

== Death ==
Pai died in Udupi on 31 July 2022, at the age of 89.
