= Manipal College of Dental Sciences =

Manipal College of Dental Sciences may refer to:

- Manipal College of Dental Sciences, Manipal; founded in 1965
- Manipal College of Dental Sciences, Mangalore; founded in 1987
