= Vaman Srinivas Kudva =

Indian banker (1899–1967)

- ವಾಮನ್ ಶ್ರೀನಿವಾಸ್ ಕುಡ್ವ
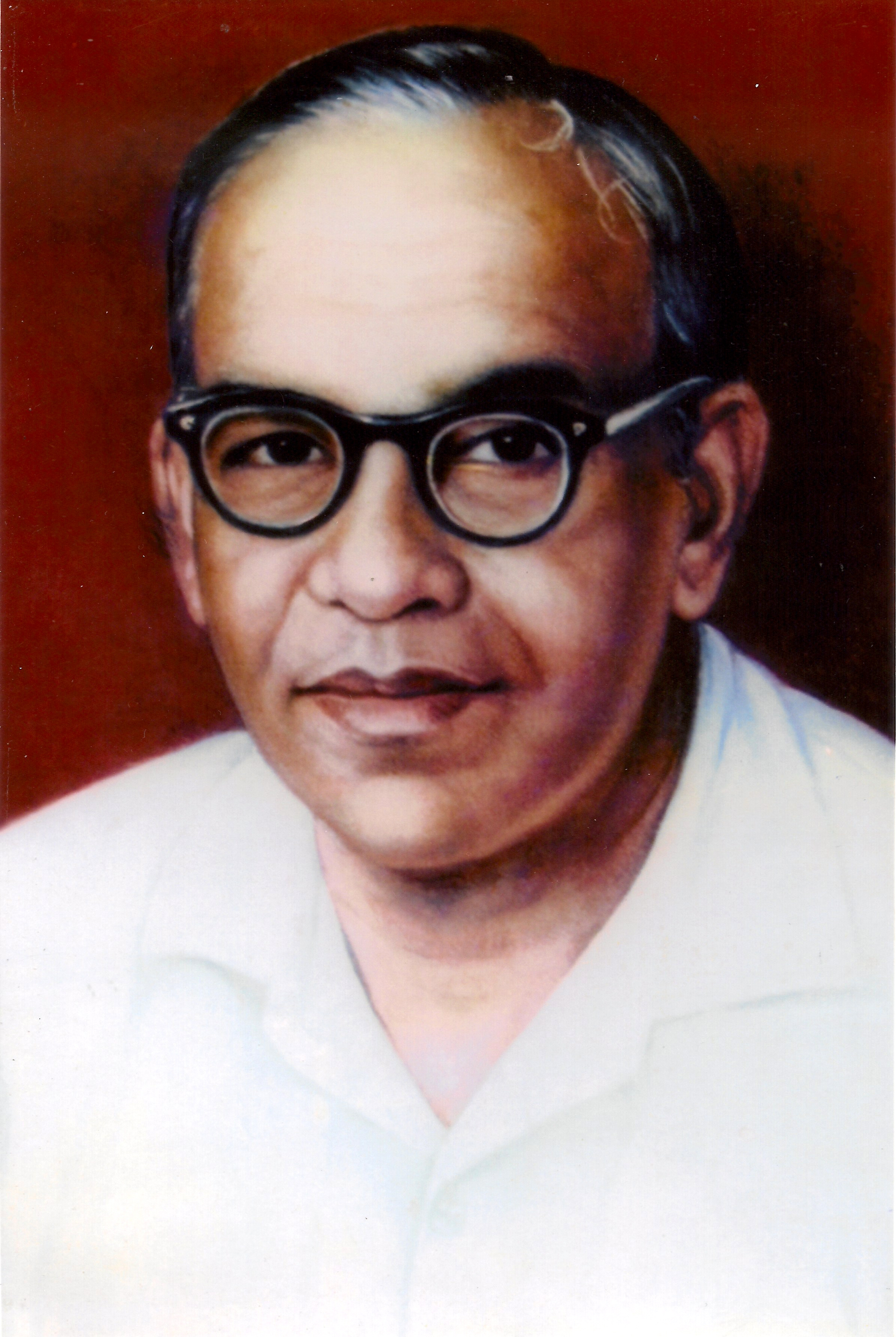
- V. S. Kudva
- Born: Vaman Srinivas Kudva; 9 June 1899; Mulki, British India (present day Karnataka, India)
- Died: 30 June 1967 (aged 68); Mangalore, Mysore State, India
- Resting place: Mangalore
- Occupation: Industrialist
- Spouse: Shantha Kudva
- Children: 6
- Website: www.canarasprings.in/about-us/our-founder/

Vaman Srinivas Kudva (Kannada: ವಾಮನ್ ಶ್ರೀನಿವಾಸ್ ಕುಡ್ವ; 9 June 1899 – 30 June 1967), popularly called V. S. Kudva, was a founding director of Syndicate Bank, one of the oldest and major commercial banks of India.

== Early life and education ==
In 1899, Kudva was born in a conservative, and traditional Goud Saraswat Brahmin (GSB) family (the family was known as the Mulki Kudvas) at Mulki, Karnataka. His father Srinivas Ramachandra Kudva owned a small hand loom unit and used to cycle to work, when cars were unknown in Mulki. Brought up in simple surroundings, Kudva had his primary school education at Mulki and high school education at Udupi. He took active part in school debates and was a good writer both in English and Kannada.

His father shifted to Udupi in 1908 and started a hardware shop, where Kudva spent his spare time. In 1918 he passed the Intermediate exam from the Government College, Mangalore and went to Bombay and joined the Mechanical Engineering Course at the Victoria Jubilee Technical Institute, Bombay (VJTI). After 3 years as a top ranking student, he gave up his studies in response to Mahatma Gandhi's non-cooperation movement and returned to Udupi. He worked as a volunteer teacher in a national school started by the Congress Party under Gandhiji's call to replace English aided schools.

== Joins the CPC Company Limited ==
From 1922 to 1926 he started an engineering workshop, and in 1926 he went to Mangalore in response to the call of V. S. Kamath, the then managing director of The Canara Public Conveyance Co. Ltd. (CPC Co Ltd), and joined it as its works manager. In 1928 he married Kamath's daughter. In 1932 he became its general manager on the death of Kamath. In 1938 he was elected Managing Director of the company and continued in that position till 1966. During his regime The CPC Co Ltd progressed and prospered and earned a great name in the country.

== Starts new industries ==
Kudva had realised that to provide employment and in keeping with the enterprising spirit of the people more and more industries must be set up. He put his conviction into practice by founding The Canara Sales Corporation Ltd. in 1938 and The Canara Motor & General Insurance Co. Ltd. in 1941.

He founded The Canara Workshops Ltd. in 1943 and started manufacture of automobile leaf springs under the brand name Canara Springs in 1950. Considering the increased demand in Northern India he opened another factory in Nagpur. The Nagpur unit was closed in the late 60's due to various problems faced by the company. The raw material for the leaf springs, spring steel flats used to be imported into the country. In the late 60s Kudva felt the need for starting a mini steel plant to manufacture the required spring steel within the country. With this in mind a mini steel plant consisting of a 5 tonne electric arc furnace, a vertical continuous casting machine to cast steel billets and a rolling mill was conceptualised.

This steel plant was commissioned in Mangalore in 1963, and production of steel started a year later after initial production related problems were sorted out. The continuous casting machine when commissioned was the very first in India.

In 1947 he started The Canara Tyre & Rubber Works Ltd. He also started and managed several other transport concerns. Bonus, gratuity, pension benefits were given to employees in his companies even before it became mandatory by law.

== Interests in journalism ==
Kudva was interested in journalism during his student days. In 1922 he edited the Kannada Weekly "Sathyagrahi". From 1923 to 1934 he worked as editor of Kannada Weekly "Swadeshabhimani".

He was a member of State Journalists Advisory Committee. In 1941 he started The Newspaper Publishers Pvt Ltd. which then published the Kannada daily newspaper "Navabharath". As its editor he earned the respect of Kannada Journalists, and also organised the Akhila Karnataka Journalist conference in Mangalore.

== Social leader ==
With T. M. A. Pai and Upendra Ananth Pai of Manipal, Kudva was one of the founder directors of the Syndicate Bank, then called the Canara Industrial and Banking Syndicate Ltd.

In 1948 he was elected President of Kanara Chamber of Commerce and Industries, South Kanara and continued as president for the next 3 years. Along with U. Srinivas Mallya he was instrumental in bringing the all-weather port and also the airport to Mangalore.

When he worked for the economic welfare of the district, he also contributed immensely in its educational progress. He started the Canara Foreign Student Loan Scholarship in 1955 now known at the Canara Foundation for giving Loan Scholarship for students going abroad for higher technical education. Once again along with U. Srinivas Mallya he was also responsible for bringing the Karnataka Regional Engineering College now called National Institute of Technology, Karnataka (NITK) at Suratkal, and he was on its Governing body for several years.

== Rotary Club ==
He was responsible for starting the first Rotary Club in Mangalore of which he was the Charter President. He was President of the S. K. Development and Welfare Board, Small Scale Industries Association and S. K. Village Industries Association.

He traveled widely in India, and abroad. This was during the days when travelling out of India was arduous and rare. He had been to the Middle East, Europe, and the United States in 1951. In 1960 and in 1963, he traveled once again to Europe, the United States and Japan.

== Legacy ==
Kudva died in 1967 and is fondly known as a "Karmayogi" to those people of Mangalore and Dakshina Kannada who still remember him.

== Book ==
Two books titled V S Kudva - His Life and Times (2014) in English and V S Kudva - Jeevana Sadhanay (2014) in Kannada authored by M Vasant Mallya was published by The Canara Foundation, Mangalore. On 27 November 2014 in Mangalore N. Vinay Hegde, Chancellor of Nitte University, released the English edition and K T Rai, General Manager of Syndicate Bank released the Kannada edition.
