= Meera Chandrasekhar =

American physicist

- ಮೀರಾ ಚಂದ್ರಶೇಖರ್
- Born: 1949 (age 76–77); Andhra Pradesh, India
- Education: Mahatma Gandhi Memorial College, Udupi B. Sc., Indian Institute of Technology Madras M.Sc., Brown University, Ph.D.
- Known for: High pressure studies of semiconductors; Hands-on physics programs for K-12 school students and teachers
- Spouse: H.R.Chandrasekhar
- Awards: 2014 Robert Foster Cherry Award for Great Teaching; 1999 Presidential Award for Excellence in Science Mathematics and Engineering Mentoring
- Scientific career
- Fields: Physics
- Workplaces: University of Missouri
- Doctoral advisor: Fred Pollak
- Website: faculty.missouri.edu

Dr. Meera Chandrasekhar (Kannada: ಡಾ. ಮೀರಾ ಚಂದ್ರಶೇಖರ್; born 1949), is a Curators’ Teaching of Physics and Astronomy at the University of Missouri. She was the recipient of the 2014 Baylor University's Robert Foster Cherry Award for Great Teaching. Her research focuses on optical spectroscopy of semiconductors and superconductors under pressure. Meera has also developed several hands-on physics programs for students in grades 5–12, and summer institutes for K-12 teachers.

== Early life and education ==
Chandrasekhar was born in Andhra Pradesh, India into an ethnic Kannadiga family. Her father Chandrapal was an officer in the Indian Army, and her mother Kusuma was a housewife. Growing up, she lived in several towns and cities across India. She is married to H. R. Chandrasekhar, a professor of physics and astronomy at the University of Missouri. They have three children.

== Education ==
Chandrapal obtained a B.Sc. degree from M. G. M. College, Udupi, in 1968, an M.Sc. from the Indian Institute of Technology, Madras, India. She received her Ph.D. at Brown University in 1976. After a post-doctoral fellowship at Max Planck Institute for Solid State Research, she arrived at the University of Missouri in 1978, where she is currently a professor in the department of physics and astronomy.

== Research interests ==
Chandrasekhar's research interests are in the area of optical spectroscopy of semiconductors, superconductors, and conjugated polymers, with an emphasis on high-pressure studies. She has published over 120 papers in this area.

== Educational interests ==
Chandrasekhar has an interest in education at all levels. At the university level she has restructured several courses in her department, and developed a physics course for elementary education majors that has an annual enrollment of over 140 students. Beginning in 1993, she led a series of programs for K-12 students and their teachers, supported by the National Science Foundation, and the Missouri Department of Higher Education. The programs included Exploring Physics for 5-7 grade female students, which focused on learning physics concepts through hands-on activities; Family Evenings with Science and Technology (FEST), a middle school parent and student program where each team built a miniature working drawbridge; Saturday Scientist, an industry based experience for 8-9 grade students designed to increase students' awareness of potential careers in the physical sciences; Newton Summer Science Academy for 9-11 grade girls, which integrated science, engineering and mathematics through a toy factory building project; and summer teacher academies for 5-12 grade science teachers. For her mentoring of young students, she received the Presidential Award for Science, Mathematics and Engineering Mentoring (PAESMEM) award in 1999. The most recent project, A TIME for Physics First, focuses on professional development and leadership training for science teachers so they can implement a yearlong course in physics at the 9th grade level. As part of this project, she and a colleague, Dorina Kosztin led the development of Exploring Physics, a digital curriculum for conceptual physics.

=== Honors ===
- 2014 Robert Foster Cherry Award for Great Teaching, Baylor University
- 2013 Finalist, Robert Foster Cherry Award for Great Teaching, Baylor University
- 2008 Missouri Educator Award, Science Teachers of Missouri
- 2006 Presidential Award for Outstanding Teaching, University of Missouri
- 2004 Curator's Distinguished Teaching Professorship, University of Missouri
- 2004 Science Teachers of Missouri Distinguished Service Award
- 2002 Distinguished Alumnus Award, Indian Institute of Technology, Madras
- 1999 Presidential Award for Excellence in Science, Mathematics and Engineering Mentoring
- 1998 Governor's Award for Excellence in Teaching
- 1997 William T. Kemper Fellowship for Teaching Excellence, University of Missouri
- 1992 Elected Fellow of the American Physical Society
- 1990 Chancellor's Award for Outstanding Research and Creative Activity in the Physical and Mathematical Sciences, University of Missouri
- 1987 Purple Chalk award for Excellence in Teaching. College of Arts and Science Student Government
- 1985 Alfred P. Sloan Fellowship
- 1970 Bronze Medal and Certificate of Merit for the first rank in the M.Sc. class, Indian Institute of Technology, Madras
- 1968 Gold Medal for distinction and first rank in the B.Sc. class, Mysore University
- 1965-70 National Science Talent Search Scholarship sponsored by the Government of India

== Interactions with popular media ==
- Getting Girls to E=mc^2, Columbia Missourian, 1993.
- Kemper Award, Columbia Missourian, 1997
- Scientist who Mentors Girls gets Presidential Award, St. Louis Post Dispatch, 1999.
- An Interview with Meera Chandrasekhar Making Strides Newsletter, News On Minority Graduate Education (MGE) Volume 2 Number 1 February 2000. By Virginia Van Horne, MGE Senior Research Associate.
