= Ranjan Pai =

Indian medical doctor and businessman

- Born: Manipal, Karnataka, India
- Citizenship: Indian
- Education: Medical graduate from Kasturba Medical College, Manipal and Fellowship in Hospital Administration in the United States
- Occupations: CEO and MD of the Manipal Education and Medical Group (MEMG), and President of Manipal Academy of Higher Education
- Father: Ramdas Pai

Ranjan Pai is an Indian medical doctor, businessperson, founder and the chairman of the Manipal Education and Medical Group (MEMG), which runs seven universities and twenty nine hospitals across the globe. As of November 2025, he is ranked 1305 in the list of the richest people in the world, with a net worth of US$2.8 billion.

== Early life and education ==
Ranjan Pai was born to Ramdas Pai who is a Padma Bhushan awardee 2011 and chancellor of the Manipal Academy of Higher Education (MAHE). His grandfather, T. M. A. Pai (Tonse Madhava Ananth Pai), set up the Kasturba Medical College, the country’s first private, self-financed medical college in 1953.

Pai completed his graduation from Kasturba Medical College, Manipal and his fellowship in Hospital Administration in the United States

== Career ==
Ranjan Pai began his career as the managing director of the Melaka Manipal Medical College in Malaysia. He initially planned to continue with the family’s not-for-profit education trust, Manipal Academy of Higher Education (MAHE), but later joined MEMG’s business. He started MEMG in the year 2000 out of a rented house in Bengaluru with a capital of $200,000. Now the entity is valued at around $3 billion.
