= List of twin towns and sister cities in India =

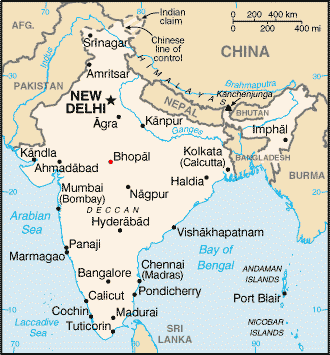
Map of India

This is a list of places in India which have standing links to local communities in other countries known as "town twinning" (usually in Europe) or "sister cities" (usually in the rest of the world).

== A ==
Agra

- Petra, Jordan
- Samarkand, Uzbekistan
- Tempe, United States

Ahmedabad

- Astrakhan, Russia
- Columbus, United States
- Guangzhou, China
- Hamamatsu, Japan
- Jersey City, United States

Amritsar

- Bakersfield, United States
- Sandwell, England, United Kingdom
- Thetford, England, United Kingdom

Anandpur Sahib

- Vernon, Canada

Aurangabad

- Dunhuang, China

Auroville

- Campinas, Brazil

Ayodhya

- Gimhae, South Korea
- Janakpur, Nepal

== B ==
Bengaluru

- Chengdu, China
- Cleveland, United States
- Minsk, Belarus
- San Francisco, United States

Bhopal

- Smolensk, Russia

Bhubaneswar

- Bloemfontein, South Africa
- Cupertino, United States

Bikaner

- Kütahya, Turkey

Bodh Gaya

- Nara Prefecture, Japan

== C ==
Chennai

- Chongqing, China
- Denver, United States
- Kuala Lumpur, Malaysia
- San Antonio, United States
- Volgograd, Russia

Coimbatore

- Esslingen am Neckar, Germany
- Toledo, United States

== D ==
Daman

- Coimbra, Portugal

Delhi

- Chicago, United States
- Leuven, Belgium
- Ottawa, Canada
- Beijing, China
- Fukuoka Prefecture, Japan
- Seoul, South Korea

Diu

- Loures, Portugal

== G ==
Greater Noida

- Loudoun County, United States

== H ==
Hyderabad

- Brisbane, Australia
- Indianapolis, United States
- Ipswich, Australia
- Montgomery County, United States
- Qingdao, China
- Riverside, United States
- Uberaba, Brazil

== J ==
Jaipur

- Calgary, Canada
- Fremont, United States

Jalandhar

- Gravesham, England, United Kingdom
- Hounslow, England, United Kingdom
- Union City, United States

Jamshedpur

- Gunsan, South Korea

== K ==
Kochi

- Menlo Park, United States
- Norfolk, United States
- Pyatigorsk, Russia

Kolkata

- Dallas, United States
- Dhaka, Bangladesh
- Incheon, South Korea
- Jersey City, United States
- Kunming, China
- Odesa, Ukraine
- Thessaloniki, Greece

Kotturu

- Shepshed, England, United Kingdom

== L ==
Lucknow

- Montreal, Canada
- Wenzhou, China

== M ==
Mangalore

- Delta, Canada
- Hamilton, Canada

Manipal

- Loma Linda, United States

Meerut

- Zhukovsky, Russia

Mumbai

- Busan, South Korea
- Galați, Romania
- İzmir, Turkey
- Los Angeles, United States
- Saint Petersburg, Russia
- Shanghai, China
- Stuttgart, Germany
- Yokohama, Japan

Mysore

- Cincinnati, United States
- Nashua, United States

== N ==
Nagpur

- Jinan, China

New Delhi

- Jersey City, United States
- Moscow, Russia
- Samarkand, Uzbekistan

== O ==
Ongole

- Uberaba, Brazil

== P ==
Panaji

- Victoria, Seychelles

Pimpri-Chinchwad

- Gunsan, South Korea
- Xiangyang, China

Pondicherry

- Basse-Terre, Guadeloupe, France

Pune

- Austin, United States
- Columbus, United States
- Fairbanks, United States
- San Jose, United States
- Stamford, United States
- Vacoas-Phoenix, Mauritius

== R ==
Rajkot

- Leicester, England, United Kingdom

== S ==
Shimla

- Carbondale, United States

== T ==
Thrissur

- Yessentuki, Russia

== V ==
Vadodara

- Ashkelon, Israel

Varanasi

- Kathmandu, Nepal

Vijayawada

- Modesto, United States

Visakhapatnam

- Carmel, United States
