= Mahatma Gandhi Memorial College =

Coordinates: 13°20′47.6″N 74°45′59.4″E

- Motto: "Sathwath Sanjayathe Jnanam"
- Type: Private
- Established: 1949
- Affiliations: Mangalore University
- Principal: Dr. Gayathri Pai
- Location: Udupi, Karnataka, India
- Campus: Urban
- Website: mgmudupi.ac.in

Mahatma Gandhi Memorial College is a degree college located in the town of Udupi, Karnataka, India. MGM College is run by the Academy of General Education, Manipal. The college also emphasizes on Sports and other Extra-curricular activities.

== History ==
The Mahatma Gandhi Memorial College was founded by Dr. T.M.A. Pai in 1949 under the University of Madras.

== Academic Programmes ==
The college offers degree programmes in the arts, commerce and science, as well as diploma courses in German language and computer science affiliated to the Mangalore University. The college has been accredited by National Assessment and Accreditation Council with the "A+" Grade (CGPA 3.36 out of 4).

== Research ==
The college has three research centres; one for Yakshagana and another is RG Pai Research Centre, which has done a Tulu lexicon project and published a Tulu dictionary. There is a regional resource centre for folk performing arts at the college campus.
