= Bukit Tinggi Medical Centre =

Hospital in Klang, Selangor, Malaysia

Coordinates: 3°00′35.6″N 101°25′54.4″E

Bukit Tinggi Medical Centre (BTMC)

Geography
- Location: Bandar Bukit Tinggi, Klang, Selangor, Malaysia

Organisation
- Care system: Private
- Type: Specialist

Services
- Emergency department: Yes
- Beds: 171

Helipads
- Helipad: No

History
- Founded: 18 July 2016

Links
- Website: www.bukittinggimedicalcentre.com

Bukit Tinggi Medical Centre (formerly known as Manipal Hospital Klang) is a modern private medical facility located in Bandar Bukit Tinggi, Klang, Selangor, Malaysia. Bukit Tinggi Medical Centre (BTMC) is a part of CAH Medical Centres, formerly a part of the Ramsay Sime Darby Healthcare Group (RSDH). RSDH Group has been acquired by Columbia Asia Hospitals, and all RSDH companies are now under CAH Medical Centres. As part of this transition, Bukit Tinggi Medical Centre is included as well. An early association with BTMC was with that of Manipal Hospitals, India.

== History ==
In August 2013, Manipal Hospitals acquired the former 72-bed Arunamari Specialist Medical Centre in Klang, Selangor. The US$100 million acquisition by Manipal Hospitals also included a new 220-bed tertiary care hospital project in Bandar Bukit Tinggi, Klang.

A modern medical facility built on a 0.85-hectare site, the Manipal Hospitals Klang (MHK) project was implemented in accordance with the Malaysian health care guidelines, MSQHA and also Joint Commission International (JCI).

In November 2021, RSDH acquired MHK and rebranded it as BTMC.

In December 2023, RSDH Group was acquired by Columbia Asia.

Logo until 2021

== Hospital facilities ==
Fully operational since 18 July 2016, Manipal Hospitals Klang (MHK) has a twin 5-storey medical towers with a built-up area of 362,000 sq ft and over 300 car park bays. The hospital provides 24-hour emergency services, 24-hour pharmaceutical service, diagnostic, surgical, interventional and rehabilitative services including super specialities such as cardiothoracic, neurology and paediatric surgeries, nephrology, vascular and plastic surgeries, cardiology, diabetes and endocrinology, gastroenterology, dental, trauma and critical care, orthopaedics, nose and throat surgery, obstetrics and gynaecology, urology, dermatology and ophthalmology. Each of these departments will be a centre of excellence.

As of July 2016, Manipal Hospitals Klang (MHK) has a team of over 300 nursing staff and 60 resident and visiting specialists, and it has a state-of-the-art trauma centre and emergency medicine services led by trauma specialist. The hospital also has a full-fledged catheterisation laboratory (cath lab), computerised tomography (CT) scan, magnetic resonance imaging (MRI) scan, bone dual-energy x-ray absorptiometry (DEXA) scan, fluoroscopy and a one-stop health screening, occupational medicine and wellness centre.

== Gallery ==
Specialist clinics & consultant's suites

Main entrance to the hospital

Lounge area at the Day Care Centre

Wellness and Health Screening Centre

Main reception lobby

Pharmacy department

== See also ==
- Healthcare in Malaysia
