= Manipal College of Dental Sciences, Mangaluru =

Dental Science college in Karnataka, India

Manipal College of Dental Sciences
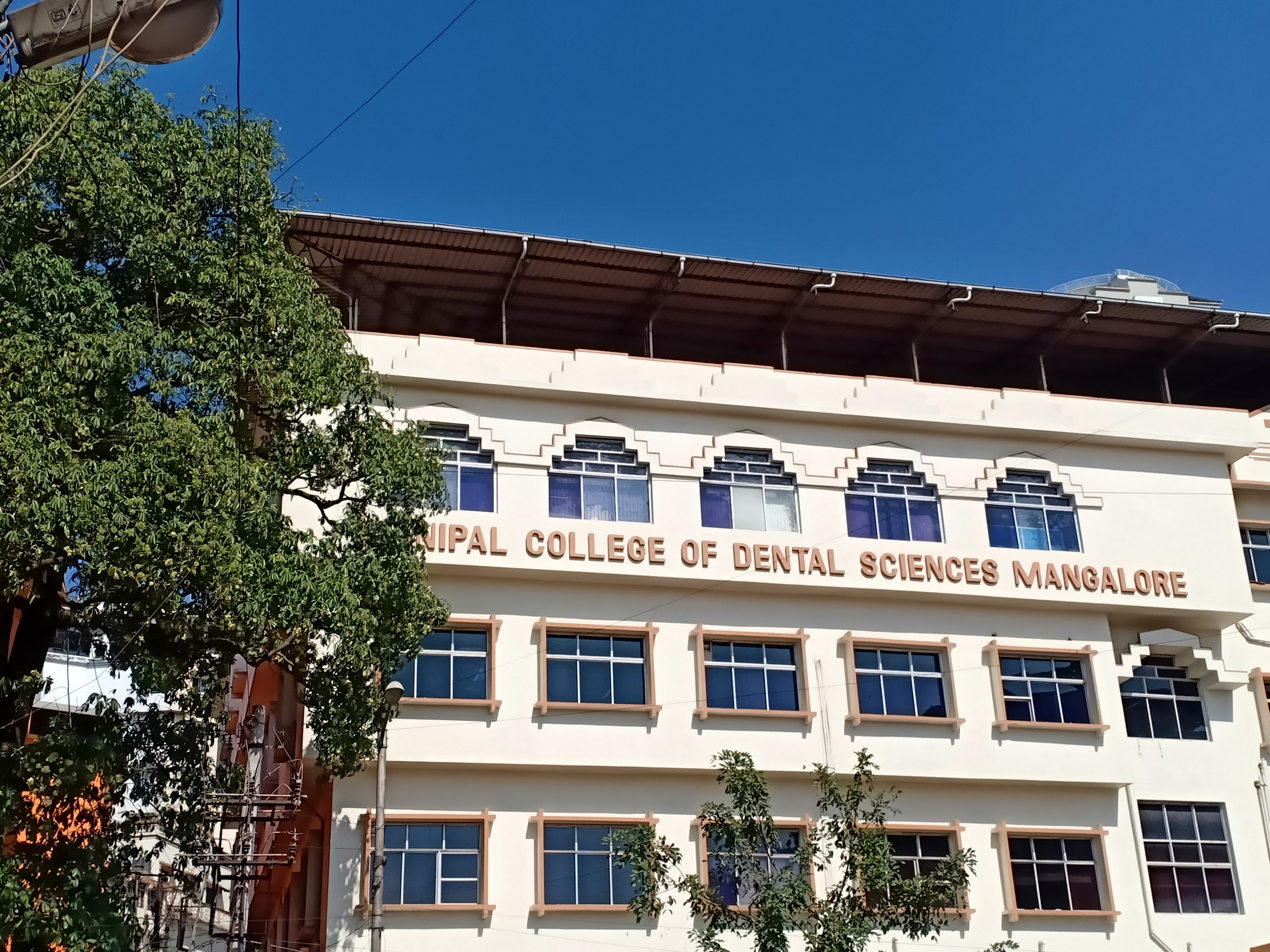
- Type: Private
- Established: 1987; 39 years ago
- Location: Mangaluru, Karnataka, India
- Campus: Urban
- Dean: Dr. Ashita Uppoor
- Website: https://manipal.edu/mcods-mangalore.html Manipal College of Dental Sciences

Manipal College of Dental Sciences, Mangaluru was founded in 1987 and recognised by the Dental Council of India in 1992 and by the Malaysian Dental Council in 2003. It was certified for ISO9001:2000 in 2006 and was re-certified for ISO9001:2008 in 2009. The college is a part of Manipal University. The college offers undergraduate (BDS) and postgraduate (MDS) programme.

The National Institutional Ranking Framework (NIRF) ranked the institute 11th in its dental institutes ranking 2024.

== Courses ==
Manipal College of Dental Sciences runs an undergraduate programme of four years followed by one year of internship which leads to a Bachelor of Dental Surgery (BDS) degree and the postgraduate programme of three years leads to a Master of Dental Surgery (MDS) degree. MDS is offered in following specialties:

- Oral Medicine and Radiology
- Conservative Dentistry and Endodontics
- Oral and Maxillofacial Surgery
- Paedodontics and Preventive Dentistry
- Periodontics
- Orthodontics and Orofacial Orthopedics
- Oral and Maxillofacial Pathology and Oral Microbiology
- Public Health Dentistry
- Prosthodontics and Maxillofacial Prosthesis

Apart from these, the institute offers an M.Sc. (Master of Science) degree in Dental Materials.

== Infrastructure ==
The institution has 260 dental chairs. Facilities include a library, lecture halls with audio-visual aids, phantom head labs for pre-clinical training and seminar/CDE rooms. Hostel facilities are available for boys and girls. Transport is provided from the hostels to the institution.

The institute is divided into Light House Hill Road Campus and Attavar Campus.

The first-year BDS students undergo training at the Centre for Basic Sciences, Bejai with separate hostel facilities provided at the same campus. The undergraduate and postgraduate training for both pre-clinical and clinical aspects are imparted at the Light House Hill and Attavar campuses. Clinical facilities for training in medical subjects are available at the Kasturba Medical College Hospital, Attavar which is a 651-bed hospital.

== Admission ==
The institution enrols undergraduates and postgraduate students through an online entrance test, conducted in April–May. The test consists of multiple choice questions from Physics, Chemistry, Biology and English.

== See also ==
- Mangalore
- KMC Hospital, Mangalore
