= H. R. Chandrasekhar =

Holalkere Rangarao Chandrasekhar
- ಹೊಳಲ್ಕೆರೆ ರಂಗರಾವ್ ಚಂದ್ರಶೇಖರ್
- Born: 1946 (age 79–80)
- Citizenship: United States
- Education: B.Sc; National College, Bangalore, Indian Institute of Technology Kanpur, Ph.D; Purdue University
- Occupation: Professor of Physics
- Spouse: Meera chandrasekhar
- Writing career
- Subject: Solid State Physics
- Notable awards: Alfred P. Sloan Fellow and a past consultant to the United Nations Development program.
- Website: web.missouri.edu/~chandrasekharh
- Scientific career
- Doctoral advisor: A.K. Ramadas

Holalkere Rangarao Chandrasekhar, (ಹೊಳಲ್ಕೆರೆ ರಂಗರಾವ್ ಚಂದ್ರಶೇಖರ್) known as "Chandra", was a professor of physics, department chair and director of graduate studies at the University of Missouri. He is an Alfred P. Sloan Fellow and a past consultant to the United Nations Development under the TOKTEN project.

== Early life ==
Chandrasekhar was born at Holalkere, a small hamlet in Chitradurga district, Karnataka to father H. V. Rangarao and mother D. Radhamma. His father was the local auditor and the Shanubhogue of Chirnahalli and Kudinirkatte. He was a well-known astrologer.

== Honors ==
- 1996-97: Visiting research scholar, department of physics, Purdue University, West Lafayette, IN 47907 (June-Dec. 1996);
- Visiting research professor, Optical Sciences Center, University of Arizona, Tucson (Jan. -June 1997).
- 1993: Consultant to India under the Transfer of Knowledge (TOKTEN) program sponsored by the United Nations Development Program (UNDP).
- 1980-1984: Alfred P. Sloan Foundation Fellowship. One of twenty-one physicists selected in National Competition on the basis of "exceptional potential to make creative contributions to scientific knowledge in the early stages of career".
