= Syndicate Bank =

Public sector bank in India(now defunct)

- Formerly: Canara Industrial and Banking Syndicate Limited
- Type: Public
- Traded as: BSE: 532276; NSE: SYNDIBANK
- Industry: Banking; Financial services
- Founded: 1925; 101 years ago in Manipal, India
- Founders: Tonse Upendra Ananth Pai; T. M. A. Pai; Vaman Srinivas Kudva
- Defunct: 1 April 2020; 6 years ago
- Fate: Merged with Canara Bank
- Successor: Canara Bank
- Headquarters: Manipal, India
- Areas served: India; United Kingdom; Oman
- Key people: T. N. Manoharan (chairman, until 2020); L. V. Prabhakar; (MD & CEO, until 2020)
- Products: Finance and insurance Consumer Banking; Corporate Banking; Investment banking Investment management Private equity Mortgages; Credit cards
- Revenue: ▼₹23,949.22 crore (US$2.5 billion) (2019)
- Operating income: ▼₹2,819.19 crore (US$290 million) (2019)
- Net income: ▲₹−2,588.30 crore (US$−270 million) (2019)
- Total assets: ▲₹3,112,789.86 crore (US$320 billion) (2019)
- Number of employees: 34,054 (2019)
- Capital ratio: 14.23% (2019)

Syndicate Bank was one of the oldest major commercial banks in India. It was founded by Tonse Upendra Ananth Pai, T. M. A. Pai and Vaman Srinivas Kudva. At the time of its establishment, the bank was known as Canara Industrial and Banking Syndicate Limited. The bank, along with 13 major commercial banks of India, was nationalised on 19 July 1969, by the government of India. It was headquartered in the university town of Manipal, India. On 1 April 2020, the bank was merged into Canara Bank.

== History ==
=== 1925 – 1974 ===
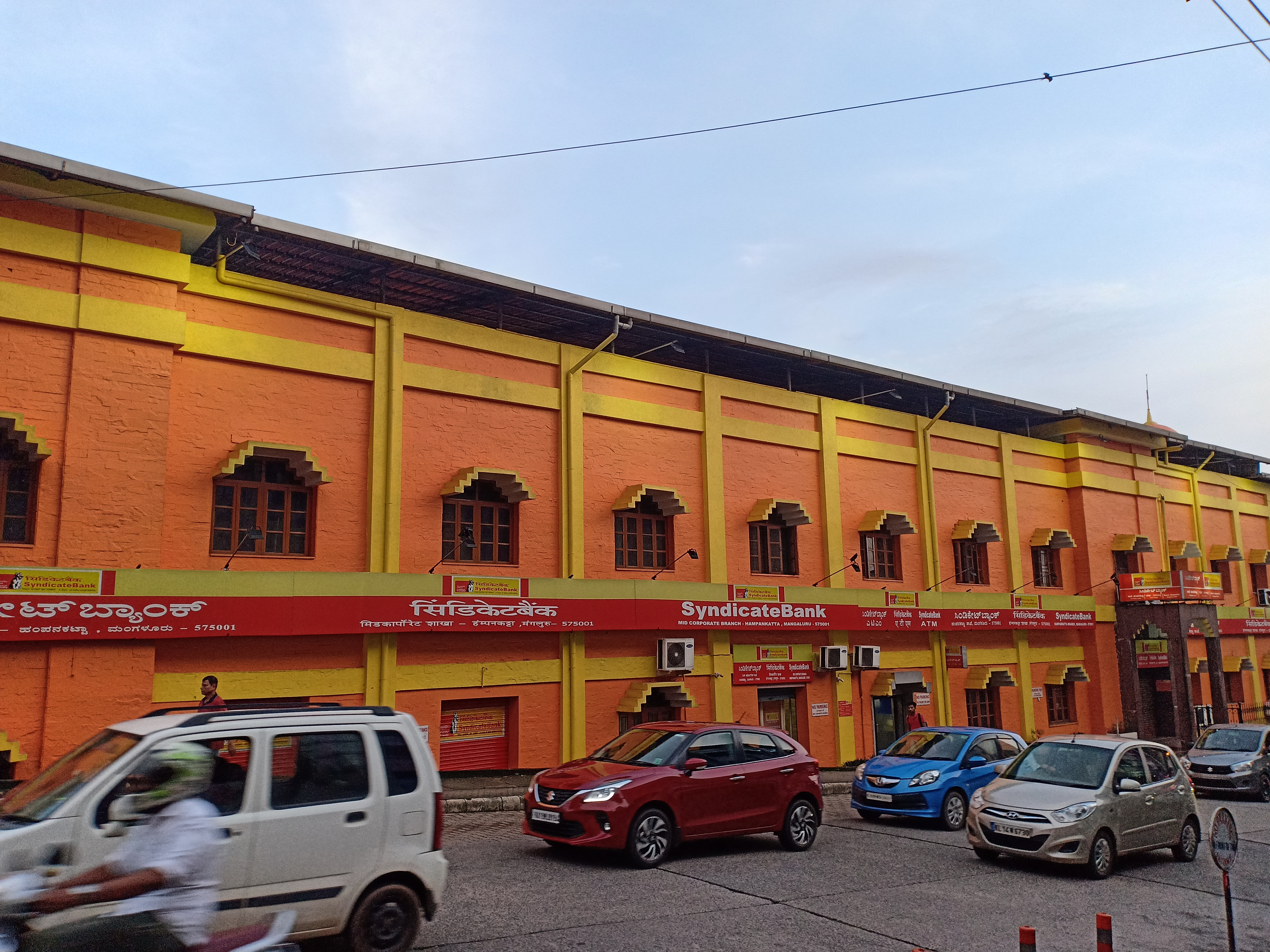
Syndicate Bank branch at Lighthouse Hill Road in Mangalore

Syndicate Bank was founded in 1925 in Manipal, Udupi, Madras Presidency, British India. The promoters came from a lower-middle-class background and aimed to improve the socioeconomic status of the region. It was the only Indian bank with its headquarters in a rural area. The bank provided employment opportunities to the educated members of the local community. It had an initial paid-up capital of ₹8,000. It was unlike other banks which primarily financed trade and industries in urban areas. So as a new bank, Syndicate Bank decided to exploit the untapped small and medium enterprise and the agriculture sector. Thus, Syndicate Bank was focussed on grassroots banking since the beginning.

In 1928, Syndicate Bank started the Pigmy Deposit Scheme. Under this scheme, banking agents travel to the doorstep of farmers and shopkeepers at set intervals to collect deposits. By 1960, 21% of the bank's net deposits came from Pigmy Deposits. Its unconventional practices had been criticised by the Reserve Bank of India (RBI). Syndicate Bank used to encourage its employees to work as Pigmy Deposit agents, during their spare time. In 1962, RBI barred it from using its employees as bank agents.

In 1950, the share of Syndicate Bank in the banking business was negligible. In 1960, it rose to 1% and to 4% in 1975. In 1968, 32% of its branches were in rural areas, whereas only 22% of branches of the entire banking system were rural. Its loans to the agriculture and small enterprises sector constituted 30% of its total loans, for the other banks it was less than 8%. 90% of its accounts were small accounts i.e., below ₹1,500. In 1969, it was nationalised along with 13 other major banks. In December 1969, it had 350 branches, and by December 1974, it had 700 branches.

=== 1975 – 2000 ===
In 1975, it established the first Regional Rural Bank (RRB) of India, Prathama Bank, in Moradabad, Uttar Pradesh. In 1976, Syndicate Bank sponsored the establishment of Malaprabha Grameena Bank in Dharwad, Karnataka. In 1983, Bijapur Grameena Bank was sponsored by Syndicate Bank, headquartered in Bijapur. In 1984, it also founded Netravati Grameena Bank in Mangalore and Varada Grameena Bank in Kumta. By December 1986, it had 1456 branches.

In the fiscal year 1996–97, it posted an accumulated loss of ₹1,003 crore (US$100 million) and a profit of ₹20 crore (US$2.1 million). In December 1997, K. V. Krishnamurti was appointed the chairman and managing director (CMD) of the bank. He found the bank overstaffed which was lowering the employee productivity. Krishnamurti stopped recruitments and encouraged voluntary retirement. By 2000, the workforce had been cut by 2,777. The bank leveraged its 1,702 branches and introduced new schemes to mobilise low-cost deposits. In the fiscal year 1999–2000, it posted a profit of ₹347 crore (US$36 million).

In the fiscal year 1997–98, it was reported that Pigmy Deposits still contributed 15.6% of its domestic deposits and 5.6% of its global deposits. In October 1999, Syndicate Bank held its first initial public offering (IPO). It offered 12.5 crore equity shares worth ₹125 crore (US$13 million) at par. The IPO diluted the stake of the Government of India to 76%. In February 2000, it was reported that the bank had further reduced its staff strengthen by 2,400 in the preceding two years.

=== 2001 – 2020 ===
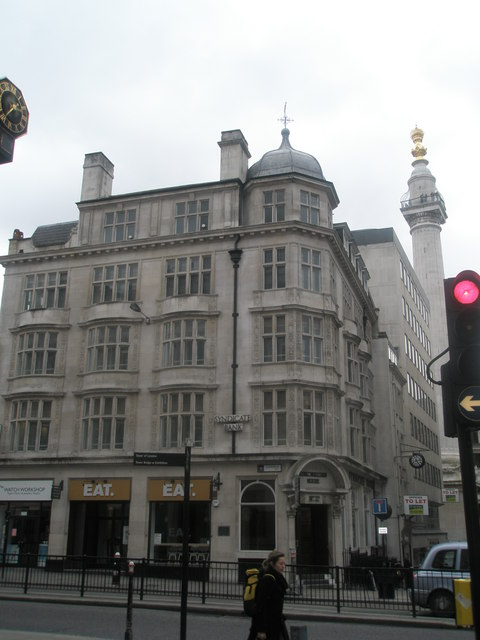
Syndicate Bank on Eastcheap in central London, UK

In 2003, Syndicate Bank tied up with the United Nations Environment Programme (UNEP) to provide loans to purchase solar lamps. In December 2003, Syndicate Bank announced sabbatical leave scheme with partial pay to reduce its employee overhead.

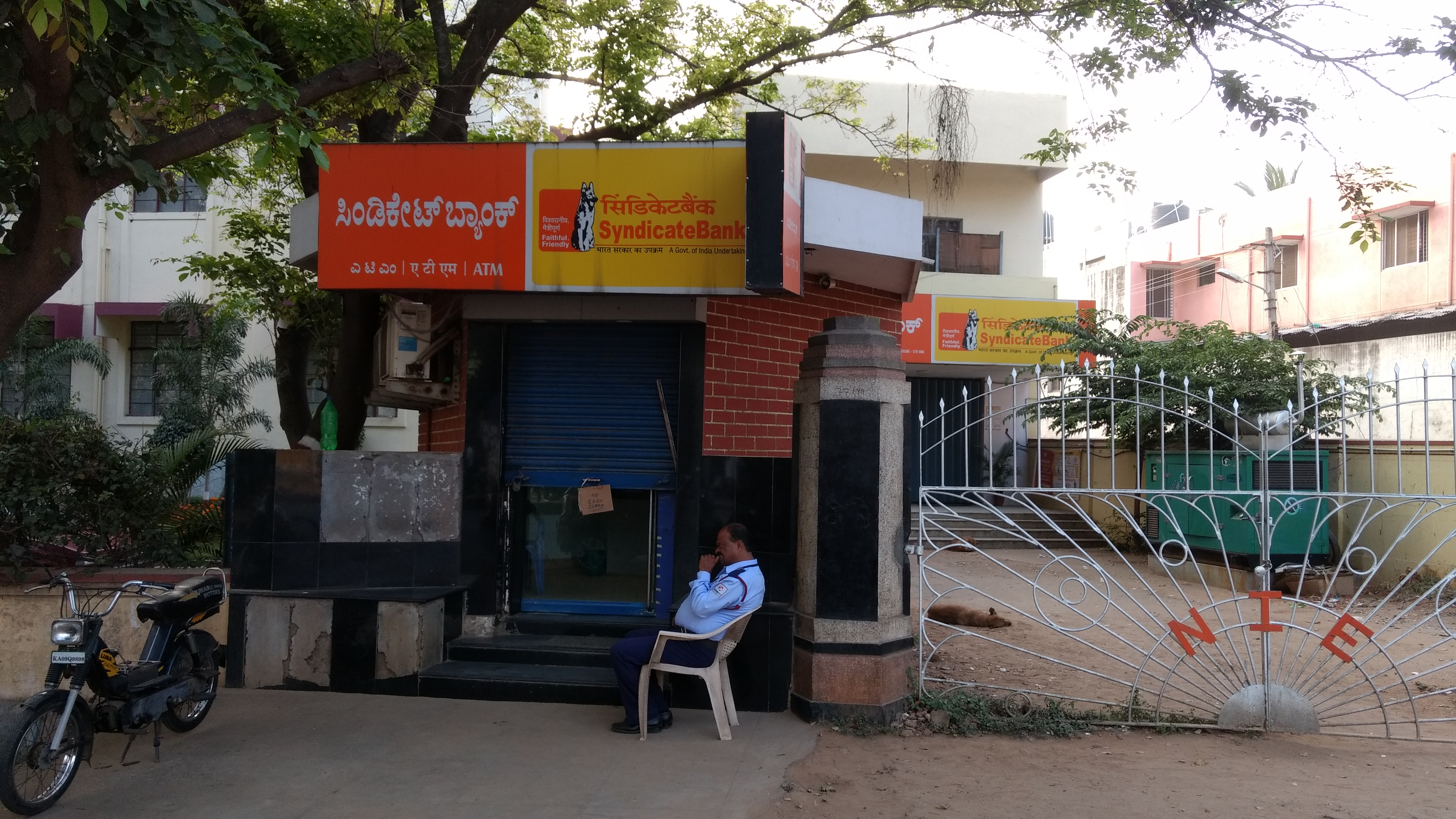
Syndicate Bank ATM in India

In July 2005, it held its equity share offering. 45 million shares with the face value of ₹10 were offered at ₹46-₹50. In September 2005, the four rural banks in Karnataka sponsored by Syndicate Bank – Malaprabha Grameena Bank, Bijapur Grameena Bank (BGB), the Varada Grameena Bank, and Netravati Grameena Bank, were merged to form Karnataka Vikas Grameena Bank.

In March 2007, the Pigmy Deposit scheme was relaunched as Pigmy 2007. The older scheme was also continued as Pigmy 1928. By March 2015, the bank had opened 3552 branches.

On 30 August 2019, Finance Minister Nirmala Sitharaman announced that Syndicate Bank would be merged with Canara Bank. The proposed merger would create the fourth largest public sector bank in the country with assets of ₹15.20 lakh crore (US$160 billion) and 10,324 branches. The Board of Directors of Canara Bank approved the merger on 13 September 2019. The Union Cabinet approved the merger on 4 March 2020. Canara Bank assumed control over Syndicate Bank on 1 April 2020 with Syndicate Bank shareholders receiving 158 equity shares in the former for every 1,000 shares they hold.

== Controversies ==
On 3 August 2014, the CMD of the bank, Sudhir Kumar Jain, and 11 others were arrested by the Central Bureau of Investigation (CBI). Jain was accused of taking bribes to extend the credit limits of companies.
