= Manipal Foundation =

- Founded: 4 January 2001
- Founder: Manipal Education and Medical Group
- Type: charitable trust
- VAT ID no.: M-20/80 G(R)/CIT/MNG/2010-11
- Registration no.: 094690014
- Purpose: Community Service
- Location(s): Bangalore, Karnataka; India
- Region served: India
- Key people: Ramdas Pai
- Website: http://www.manipalfoundation.in/

The Manipal Foundation, is a charitable trust recognized under the Indian Income Tax Act, 1961. It is the philanthropic arm of Manipal University and was founded in 2001.

It pursues several developmental activities, from offering scholarships and freeships worth Rs. 15 Crore for meritorious students, to running maternal and child welfare homes for the rural population in the region, and sponsoring free heart surgeries for children belonging to the lower socio-economic strata. ‘Manipal Arogya Card’, the health insurance scheme of Manipal Foundation, covers over 1,00,000 people who live below the poverty line.
