= Manipal College of Dental Sciences, Manipal =

Dental Science college in Manipal, Karnataka, India

- Motto: "Knowledge is Power"
- Type: Private
- Established: 1965
- Administrative staff: 300
- Location: Manipal, Karnataka, India; 13°21′15.2″N 74°47′22.7″E
- Campus: Suburban
- Dean: Dr. Gopalakrishnan Dharmarajan
- Website: MCODS

The Manipal College of Dental Sciences, Manipal, also known as MCODS, was established in 1965 and received accreditation by the Dental Council of India in 1970. It was India's first private dental college and 14th dental college. It is a constituent college of Manipal University. On 29–30 May 2006 a certification audit was completed by TÜV Rheinland it was recommended certification for ISO 9001:2000

The very first principal of the college was Dr. Sunder Vazirani, followed by Dr. K.L. Shourie from Mumbai and then Dr. K. S. Bhat. Many more have added on as time went by. In 1972 it added the MDS (Masters)program to its curriculum.

== Ranking ==
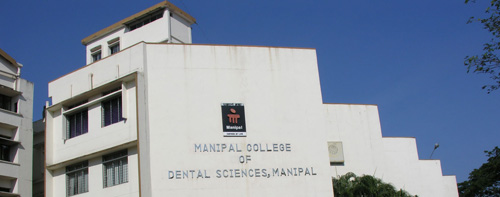
Manipal College Of Dental Sciences, Manipal building

University and college rankings

Dental – India
- NIRF (2023): 2
- NIRF (2024): 2

The Manipal College of Dental Sciences was ranked 2nd among dental colleges in India by the National Institutional Ranking Framework (NIRF) in 2023 and 2024.
