= KMC Hospital, Mangaluru =

KMC Hospital, Mangalore
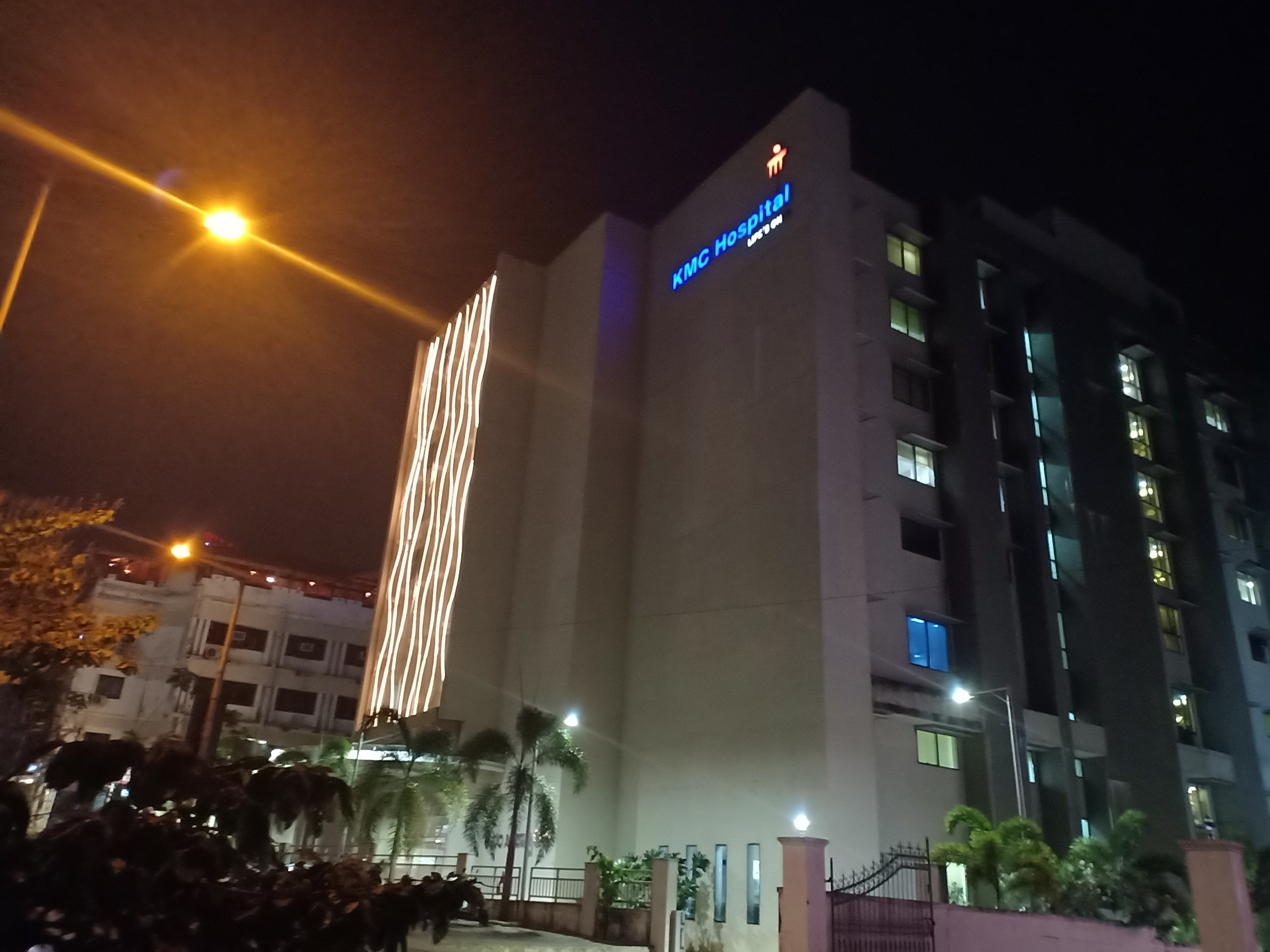
- KMC Hospital near Jyothi circle in Mangaluru

Geography
- Location: Mangaluru, Karnataka, India
- Coordinates: 12°52′22″N 74°50′57″E

Organisation
- Type: General, Private hospital

Services
- Beds: 600 (KMC, Attavar), 250 (KMC, Jyothi)

Links
- Website: www.manipalhospitals.com/mangalore

KMC Hospitals, also known as Kasturba Medical College Hospitals (Mangaluru) are two hospitals situated in Mangalore. The hospitals are teaching hospitals of the Kasturba Medical College, Mangalore, a constituent unit of Manipal Academy of Higher Education. The hospital at Ambedkar circle is a part of the Manipal Hospitals.

== Centers of excellence ==
The hospital has various Centers of Excellence (CoE) such as

- Gastroenterology
- Cancer care
- Cardiology
- Nephrology
- Neurology
- Neurosurgery
- Obstetrics and Gynecology
- Spine care
- Joint replacement and Sports injury
- Urology
