= Pigmy Deposit Scheme =

Scheme in India for small daily saving

Pigmy Deposit Scheme is a monetary deposit scheme introduced by Syndicate Bank, India in 1928.

Initially, money as small as two annas (an anna is a monetary unit of India, equal to one sixteenth of a rupee) can be deposited into an account on a daily basis in the pigmy deposit scheme in 1928. Money in amounts as small as five rupees can be deposited into an account on a daily basis, by a bank agent collecting the money from the account holder's doorstep. The scheme was introduced to help daily wage earners, small traders and farmers begin saving, as a means to fund their bigger capital requirements such as weddings or purchases of homes or vehicles.
