= Ramdas Pai =

Chancellor of Manipal University

Dr. Ramdas Madhava Pai
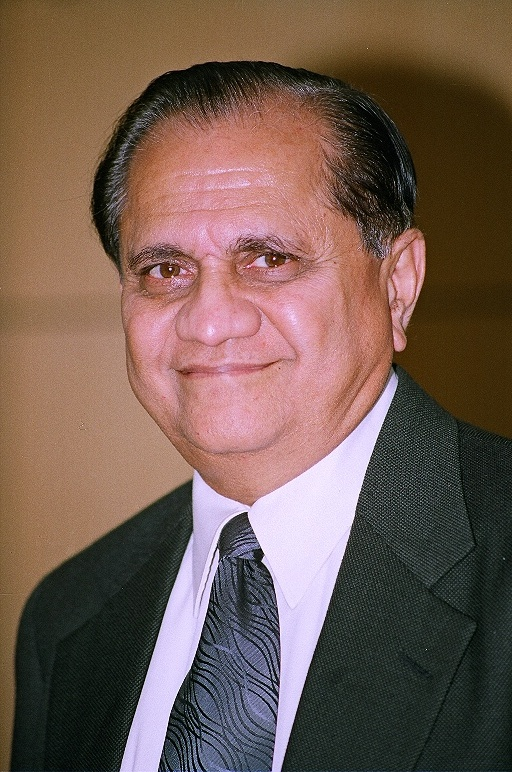
- Born: 17 September 1935 (age 90); Udupi, Madras Presidency, British India
- Education: Karnatak University (MBBS) Temple University (MHA)
- Occupation: Chancellor of the Manipal Academy of Higher Education
- Spouse: Vasanthi Pai
- Children: 3, including Ranjan Pai
- Parents: T. M. A. Pai; Sharada Pai
- Relatives: T. A. Pai (Cousin); Ramesh Pai (Cousin)
- Honors

Dr. Ramdas Madhava Pai (born 17 September 1935) is an Indian health administrator and the incumbent Chancellor at the Manipal Academy of Higher Education, and chairman of the Manipal Education and Medical Group.

== Education ==
Pai graduated with his MBBS from Karnataka University in 1958. He later graduated from Temple University with his Master of Health Administration.

== Career ==
In 1961, he returned to Manipal to become the administrator of Kasturba Hospital, the teaching hospital of Kasturba Medical College. After the death of his father T. M. A. Pai in 1979, he became the head of the group and later took over as chancellor in due course Chancellor of the Manipal Academy of Higher Education and the Chairman of the Manipal Education and Medical Group. He is also the Pro-Chancellor of Sikkim Manipal University and president of T. A. Pai Management Institute and chancellor of the Manipal Academy of General Education, Manipal.

His efforts led to MAHE getting the status of a deemed university granted by the University Grants Commission in 1993. Manipal Education and Medical Group under his watch has led to exponential growth.

He has previously served as a member of the Executive Council of Assam University, the academic senate of Mangalore University, and the National Assessment and Accreditation Council.

In 2000, he was nominated by the Union Minister of Human Resource Development to a special six-member advisory committee to the Department of Higher Education.

In 2001, Pai set up the Manipal Foundation to run the university's philanthropic efforts.

His son Ranjan Pai is an educationist and healthcare baron, who controls the Manipal Group.

== Awards and honours ==
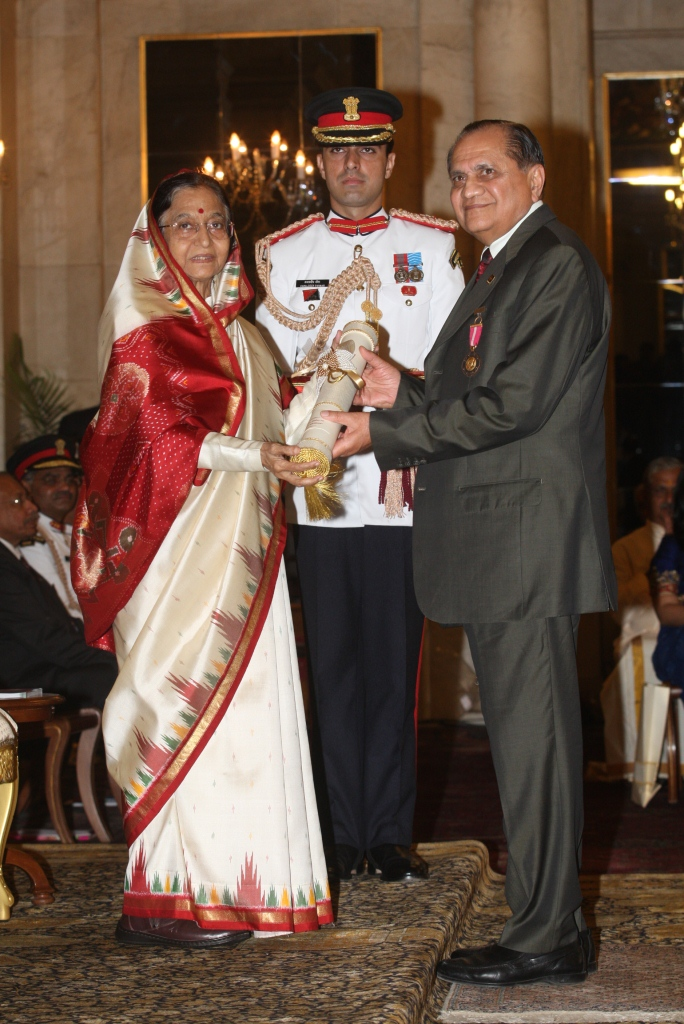
Ramdas Pai of Manipal University receives the Padma Bhushan.

Pai’s contributions to education have been recognised nationally and internationally. He has received a number of awards and honours in recognition of his contribution to education, healthcare, business and community service.

- In 2011, he received the Padma Bhushan from the President of India Pratibha Patil for his outstanding contribution in the field of education and healthcare He received the "Udupi Rathna in 2005 from the Udupi Utsav Committee and honoured by the Government of Karnataka in 2006 in celebration of the Suvarna Karnataka Year.
- 'Kanara Ratna Award' by Kanara College Society, Kumta in Feb 2008.
- He received an Honorary Doctorate by the Milwaukee School of Engineering in 1996 and Andrews University in 1998 and serves as honorary Professor of International Health at the University of Minnesota Medical School since 1999. The Faculty of General Dental Practitioners of the Royal College of Surgeons of England bestowed him with fellowship in 2004.
- In 1993, he accepted the Dr. B. C. Roy Award for his community health efforts from the President of India Shankar Dayal Sharma in 1993. and received the Phillips Medal of Ohio University in recognition of public service.
- He was presented the Key to the City of Loma Linda, California in 1982 and 1991.
- Intellectuals Honor – The Great Son of the Soil award by All India Conference of Intellectuals in 1997.
- Award of Philanthropy by Bunts' Sangha, Bombay in 1992.
- 'Konkani Prathibha' award by Konkani Bhasha Prachar Sabha, Cochin in 1994.
- Award by World Konkani Convention in 1995.
- Lions Millennium Award 2001 conferred by Lions District 324-D4.
- Deccan Herald Avenues HR Excellence Lifetime Achievement Award in February 2005.
- 'MMA-KVK Outstanding Manager Award-2005' by Mangalore Management Association in December 2005.
- 'life time achievement award 2018' by the federation of Indian Chambers of commerce and industry (FICCI).
- Golden Peacock Lifetime Achievement Award for the Year 2011.
- SkillTree Education Evangelist of India-2013.
