= T. M. A. Pai =

Founder of modern Manipal

Tonse Madhava Ananth Pai
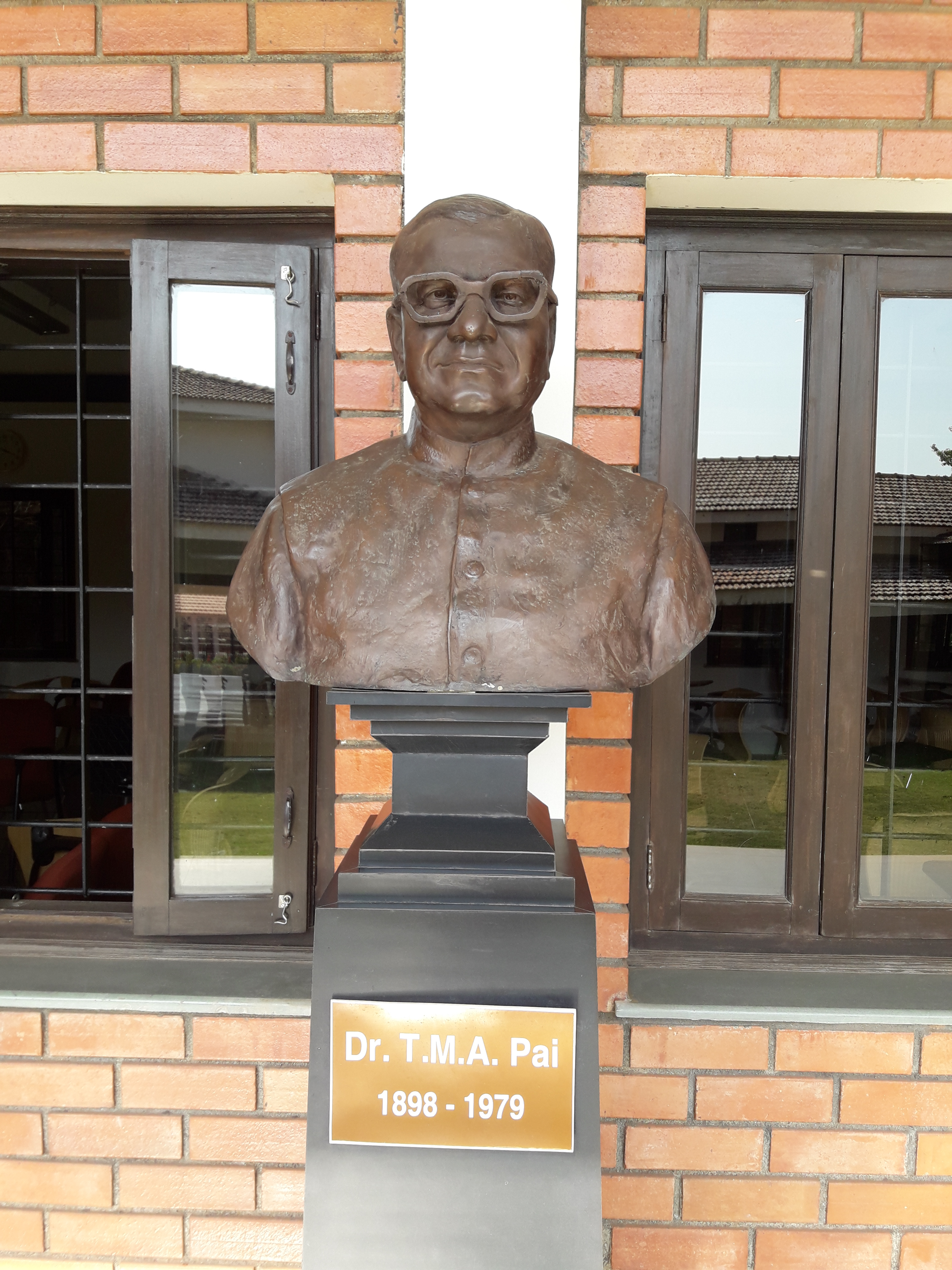
- Bust of T. M. A. Pai at the Manipal Centre for Philosophy and Humanities, Manipal
- Born: 30 April 1898; Udupi, Madras Presidency, British India (present day Karnataka, India)
- Died: 29 May 1979 (aged 81); Manipal, Karnataka, India
- Education: Stanley Medical College, Chennai; Karnataka University, Dharwad; Andhra University, Visakhapatnam
- Spouse: Sharada Pai
- Children: T. Mohandas Pai, Ramdas Pai, Panduranga Pai, Malathi Shenoy, Suneethi Nayak, Narayana Pai, Vasanthi Shenai, Jayanthi Pai, Ashok Pai, Indumathi Pai, Asha Pai
- Relatives: T. A. Pai (Nephew); Ramesh Pai (Nephew)
- Awards: Padma Shri (1972)

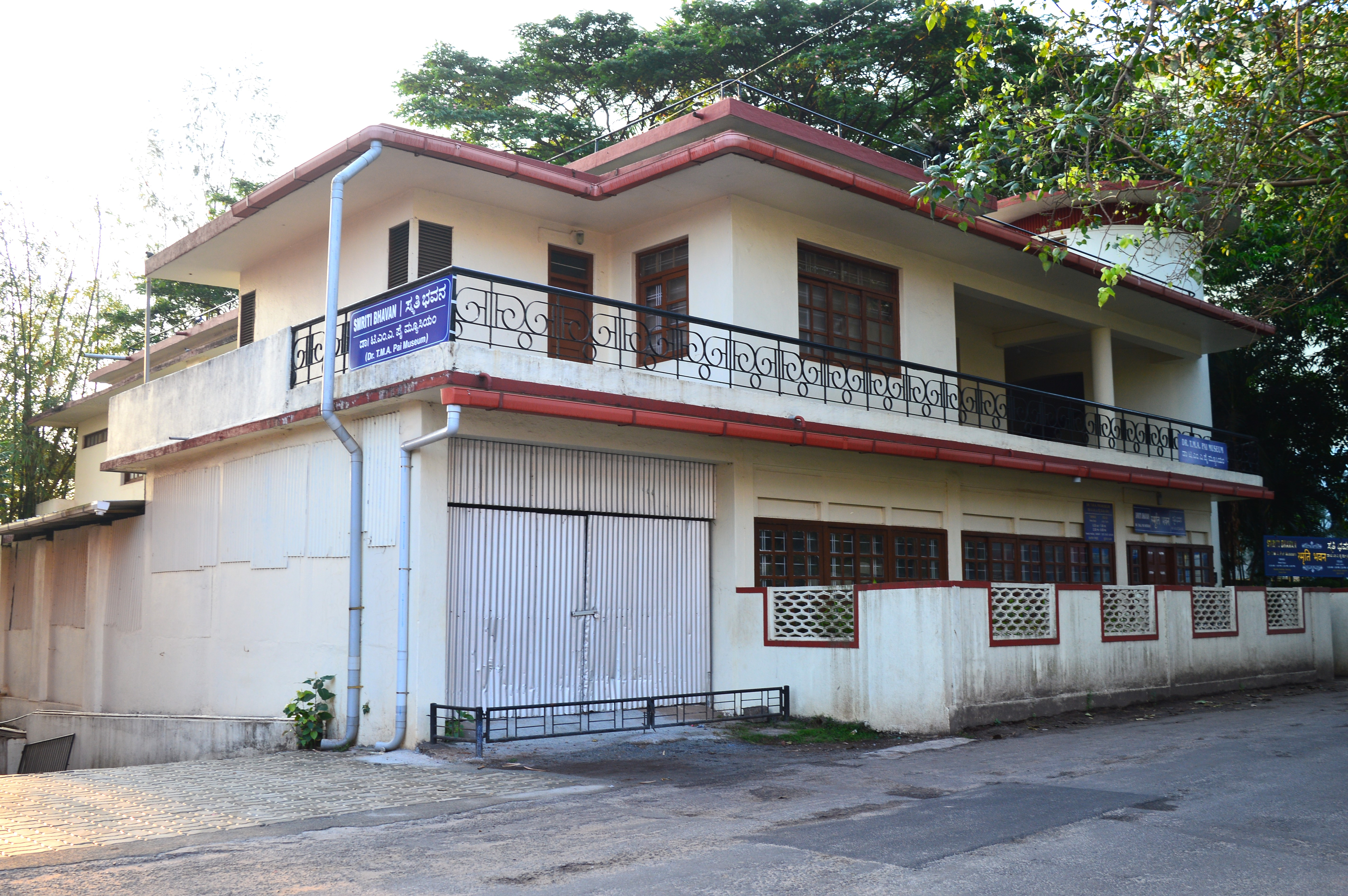
The house of T. M. A. Pai located in Manipal; it has since been converted to a museum.

Tonse Madhava Ananth Pai (30 April 1898 – 29 May 1979), was an Indian physician, educationist, banker and philanthropist, most well-known for building the university town of Manipal, India.

He was the first to start a private, self-financing medical college offering MBBS in India. Pai established the Kasturba Medical College in 1953 and Manipal Institute of Technology in 1957, which was followed by a string of other education institutions including Manipal College of Dental Sciences, Manipal College of Pharmaceutical Sciences and Manipal Pre-University College. He, along with his brother Upendra Ananth Pai, also established Syndicate Bank originally in Udupi, Karnataka, which has its headquarters now in Manipal and Bangalore. He was responsible for its popular Pigmy Deposit Scheme.

== Early life ==
Born in 1898, Tonse Madhava Ananta Pai belonged to a lower-middle-class household of Gowd Saraswath Brahmins of Kallianpur, a village in Udupi.

== Awards ==
Pai was conferred the Padma Shri by the Indian government in 1965. He was awarded the degree of D.Litt. by the Karnataka University, Dharwad in 1973 and the Andhra University, Visakhapatnam in 1975.

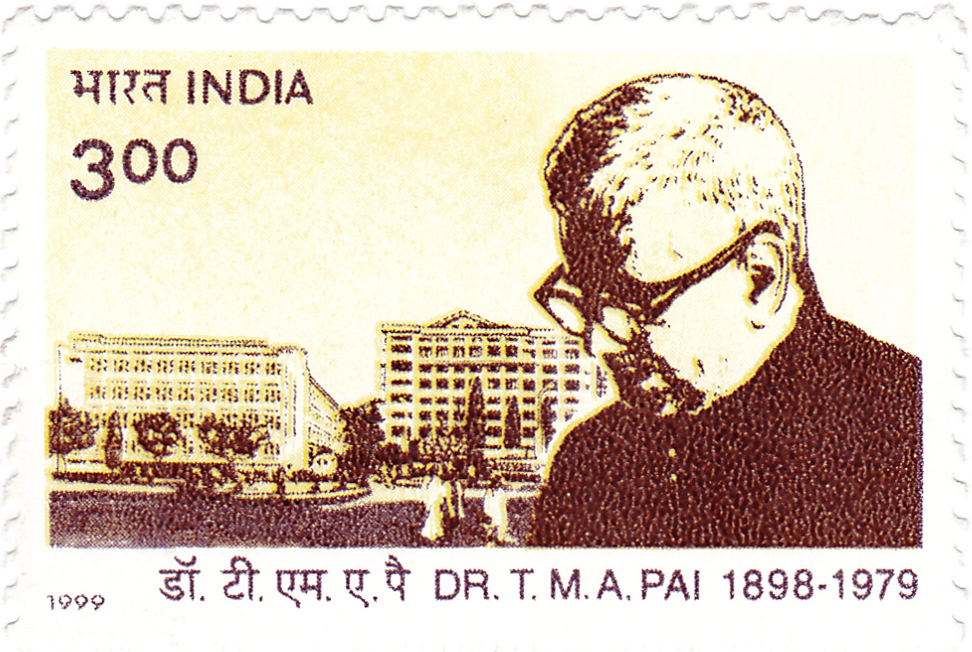
TMA Pai 1999 stamp of India

The Government of India brought out a stamp commemorating Pai on 9 October 1999.

== See also ==
- T. Mohandas Pai
