= Tonse Ramesh Upendra Pai =

Indian banker

Rotarian Tonse Ramesh Upendra Pai
- Born: 22 October 1924
- Died: January 26, 2005 (aged 80)

Tonse Ramesh Upendra Pai (22 October 1924 – 26 January 2005) was an Indian banker and educationalist. A monument was erected in Manipal in 2018 in honour of him.
