= Manipal =

- Suburb/Town
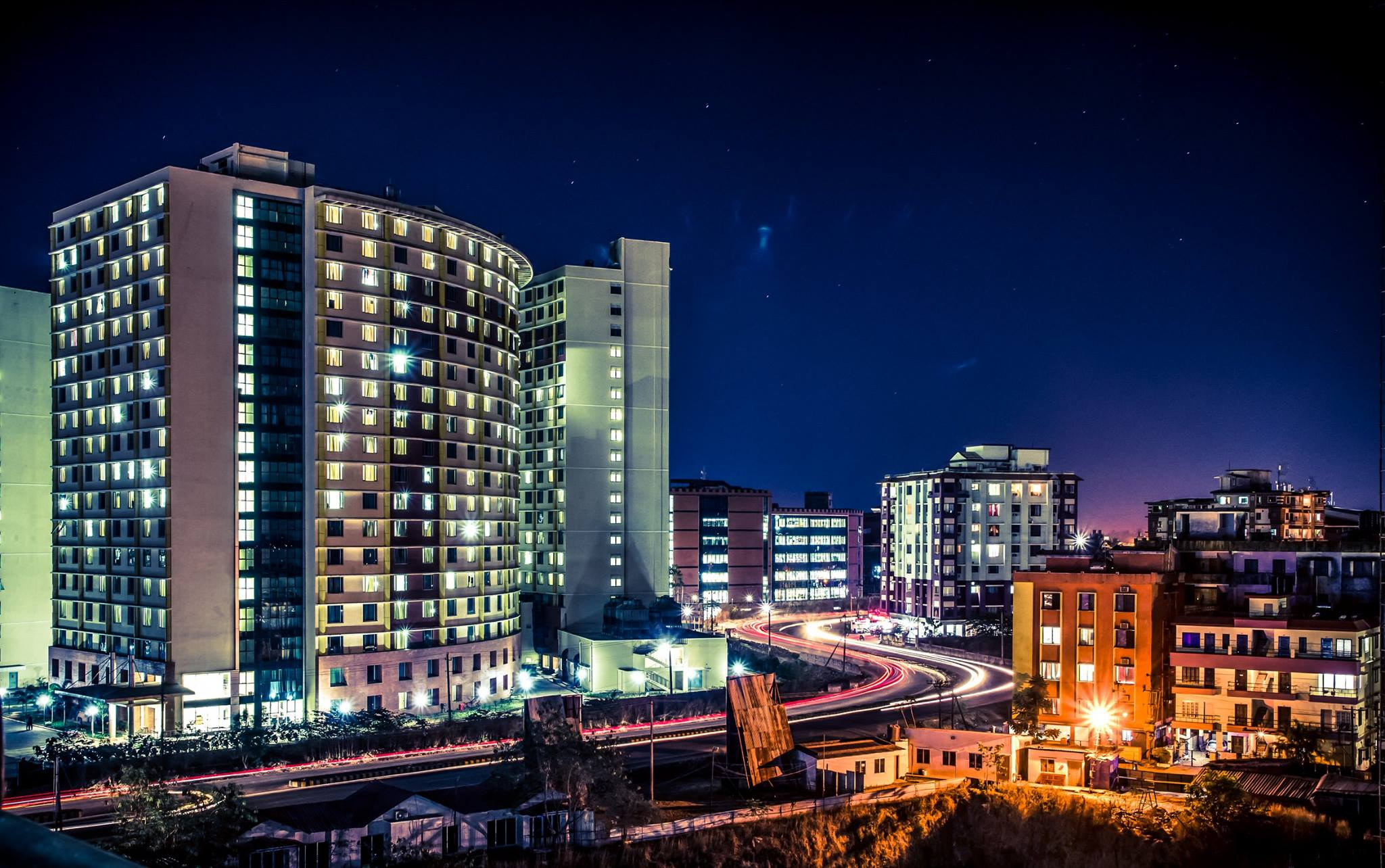
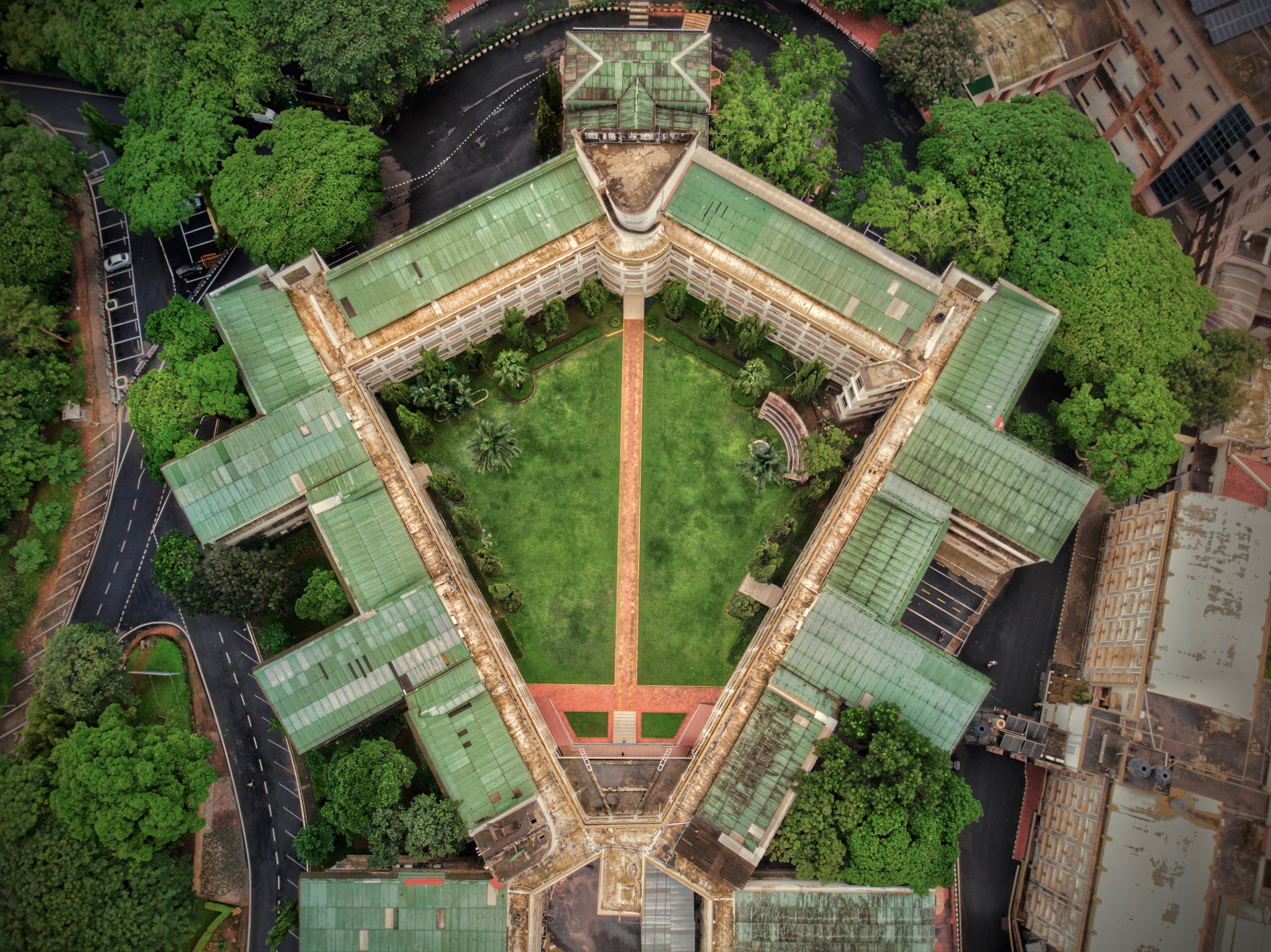
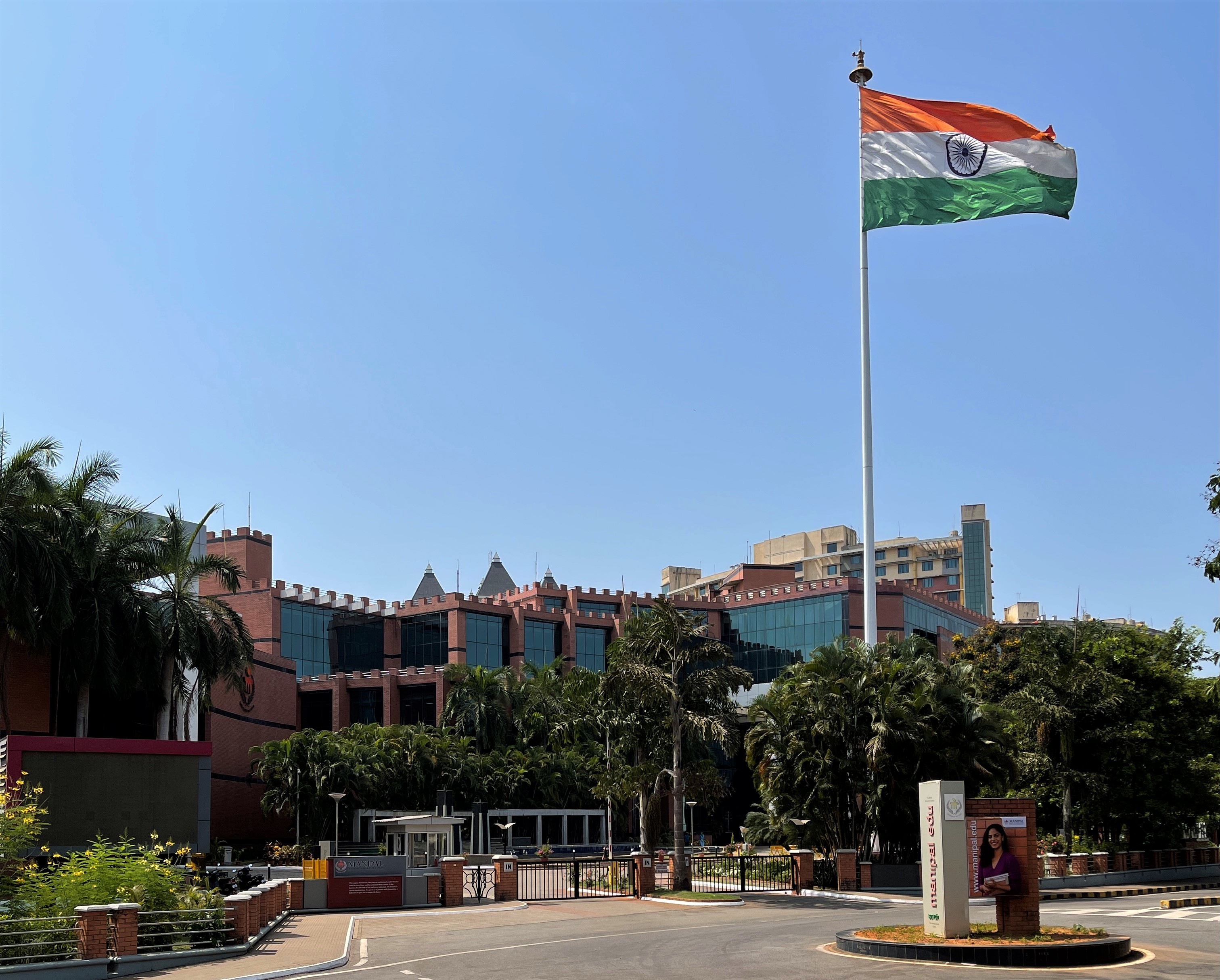
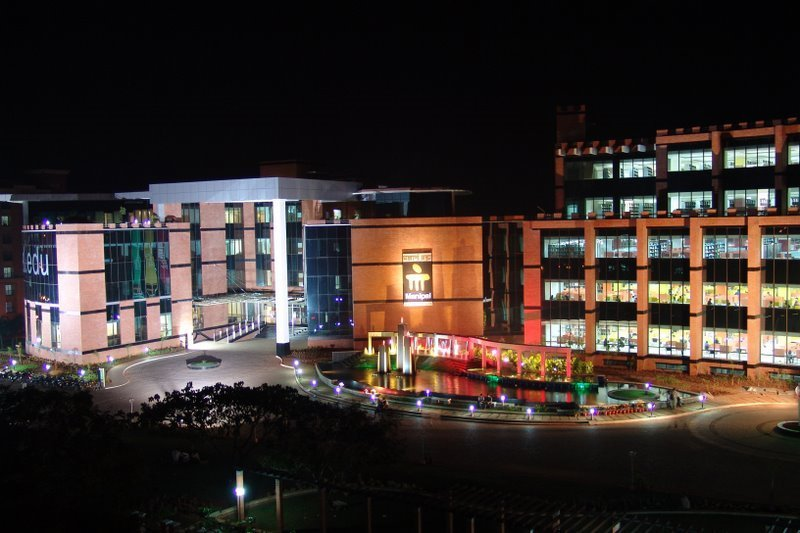
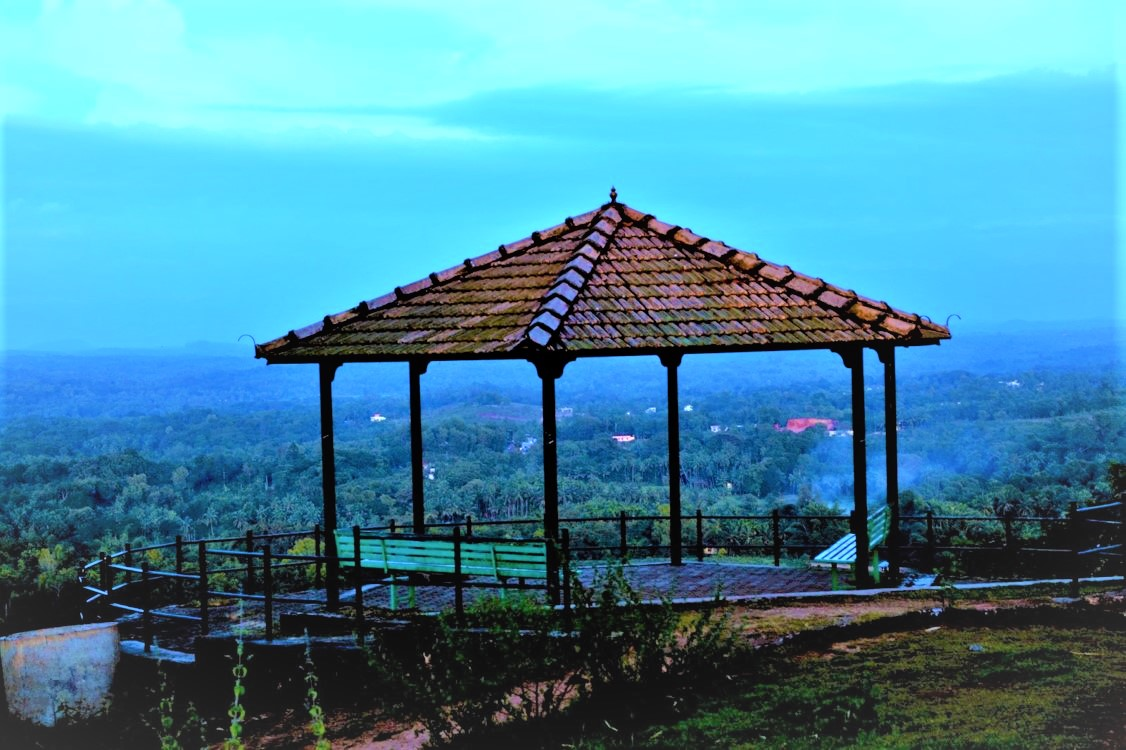
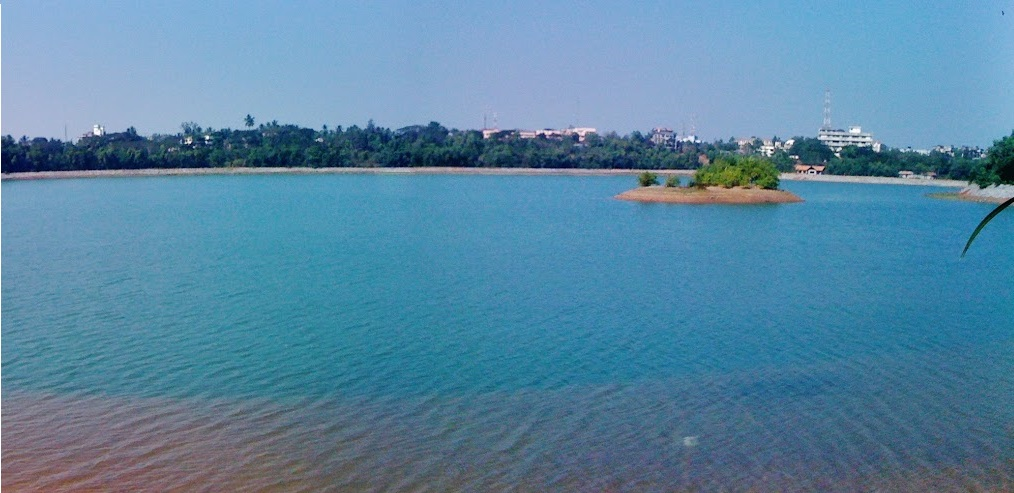
- Manipal Skyline, Manipal Institute of Technology, Manipal Academy of Higher Education, Manipal End Point Park, Manipal Lake

- Location within Karnataka Location within India
- Coordinates: 13.347°N 74.788°E
- Country: India
- State: Karnataka
- District: Udupi
- Region: Tulu Nadu

Area
  - Total: 29.71 km^{2} (11.47 sq mi)
- Elevation: 73 m (240 ft)

Population (2020)
  - Total: 50,001
  - Density: 1,683/km^{2} (4,359/sq mi)
- Demonym: Manipalite

Languages
  - Official: Kannada, English, Tulu
- Time zone: UTC+5:30 (IST)
- PIN: 576 104
- Telephone code: 0820
- ISO 3166 code: IN-KA
- Vehicle registration: KA-20
- Website: www.udupicity.mrc.gov.in

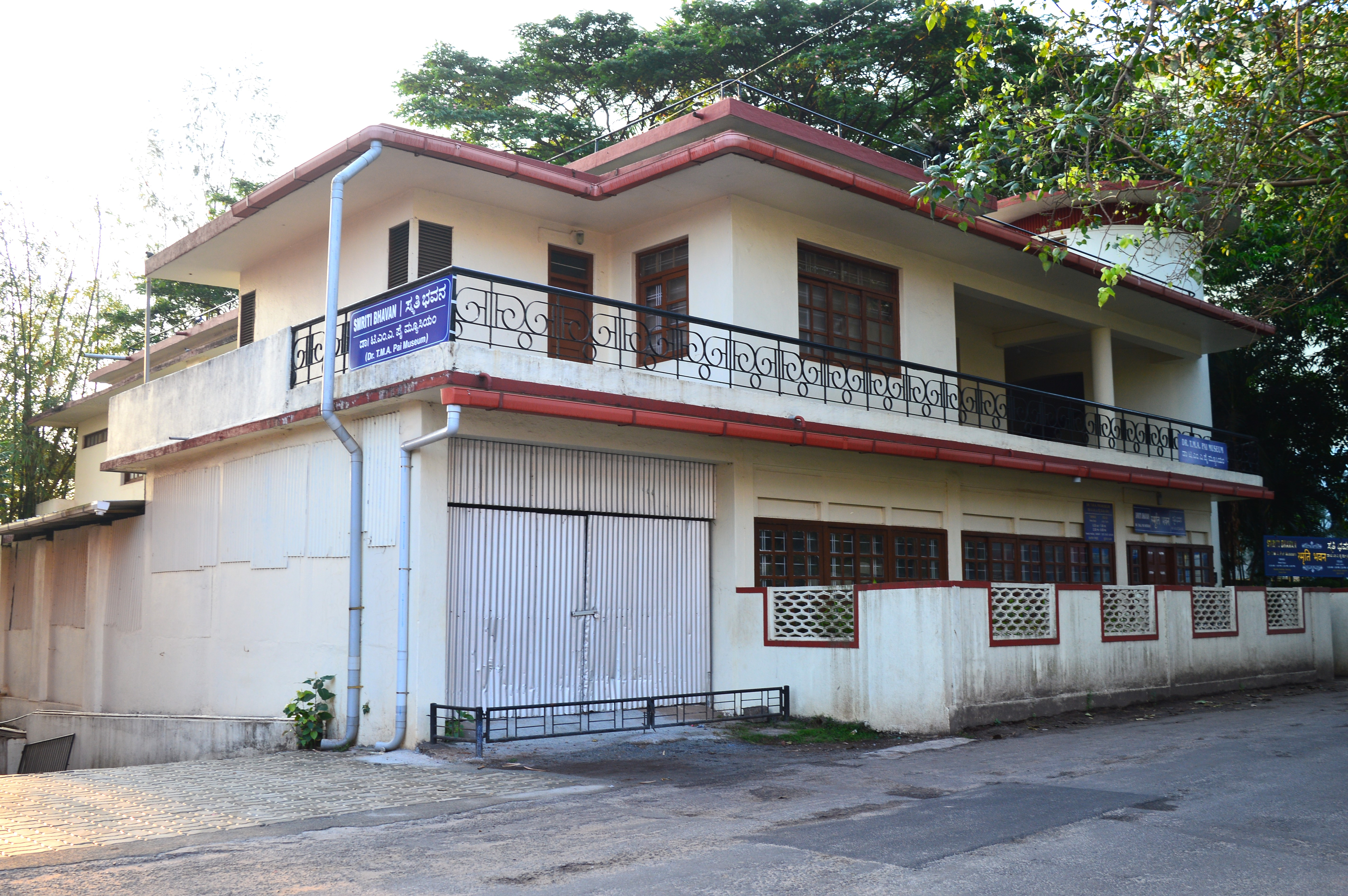
The house of T. M. A. Pai located in Manipal; it has since been converted to a museum.

Manipal (Kannada: [mɐɳipaːlɐ]) is a suburb and town within Udupi, in coastal Karnataka, India. Manipal is located five kilometres away from the centre of Udupi City, in Udupi District, Karnataka (state) in south western India. It is administered by the Udupi City Municipality. The suburb is located in coastal Karnataka, 62 km north of Mangalore and 8 km east of the Arabian Sea. From its location on a plateau, at an altitude of about 75 metres above sea level, it commands a panoramic view of the Arabian Sea to the west and the Western Ghats to the east. Manipal has a tropical climate with moderate to heavy rainfall during the monsoon season, making it lush and green throughout the year.

Home to the Manipal Academy of Higher Education, the town attracts more than twenty-five thousand students every year, hence most of the population consists of students or university staff. There are numerous spots throughout the suburb that attract students from nearby Mangalore and Udupi such as End Point, Manipal Lake, Malpe Beach, and Peacock Point. The city owes its development to Manipal Academy of Higher Education for converting this into a student city. It is called "Campus Town" by the locals.

A regional information technology hub, Manipal has one of the highest densities of professional and graduates in India.

== Etymology ==
Manipal derives its name from 'Manna Palla (meaning "muddy hole" or "muddy lake" in Tulu) commonly called Manipal Lake, a freshwater lake within Manipal.

== Location ==
Situated 5 km (3.1 mi) east of the center of the temple city of Udupi and 65 km (40 mi) north of Mangalore, Manipal was previously part of the Shivalli village panchayat. Now it is part of Udupi city. The name is derived from "munn" and "palla", anglicised to Manipal. Munn means "mud" and palla means "lake" in Tulu language. This lake, roughly in the shape of 500 mtrs. diameter circle, after which Manipal is named, is located in the middle of the town and about 6 km (3.7 mi). away from the Arabian Sea, and has a boating facility. The Swarna River passes just north of Manipal. Recreational facilities are available through End Point Park and Tree Park.

Manipal was once a barren hill with few trees. This hill was transformed into the university town, what it now is, by Dr. T. M. A. Pai, who first started the Kasturba Medical College in 1953, now a part of the university Manipal Academy of Higher Education (MAHE). Tourist spots like Agumbe, Kudremukh, Kapu and Malpe are also located nearby.

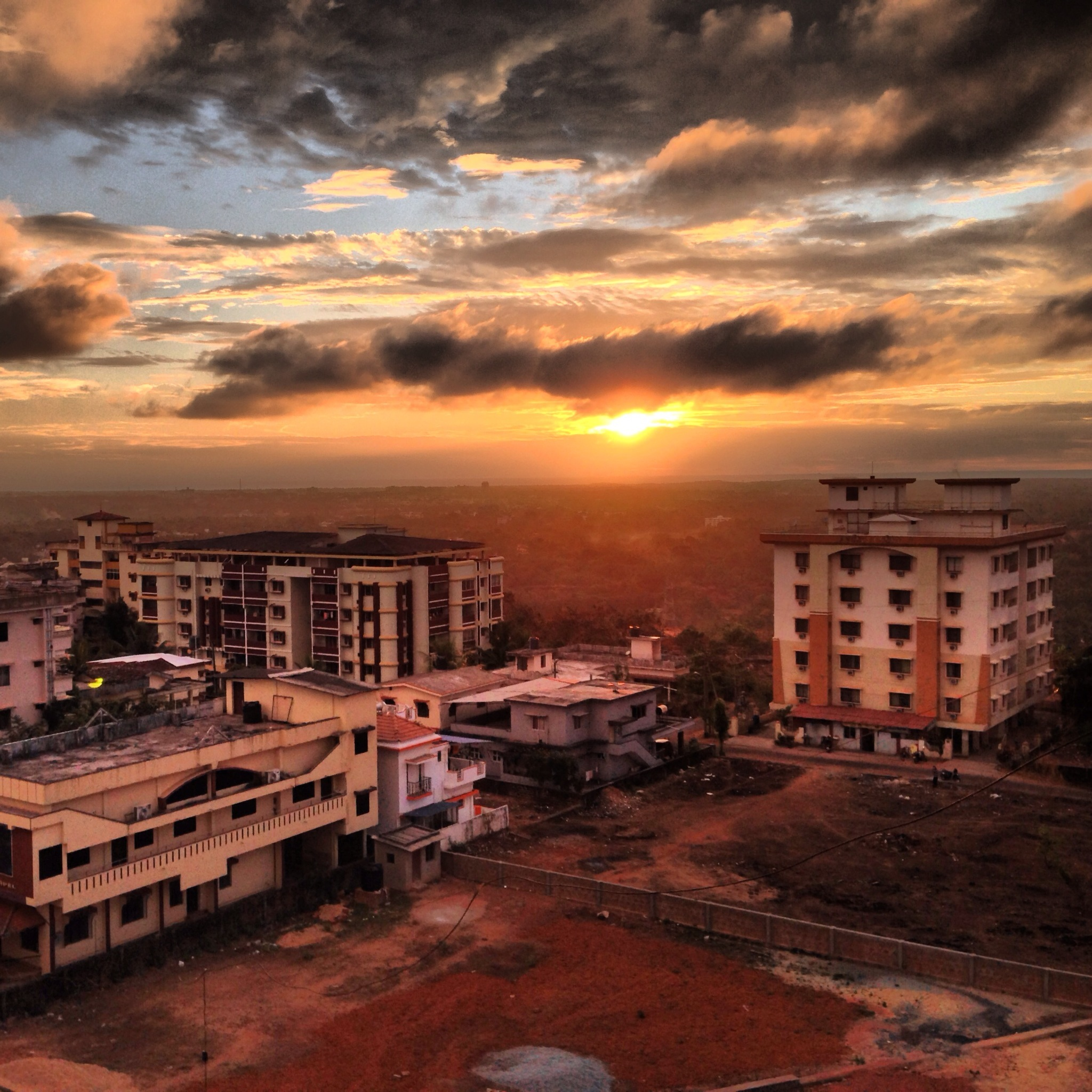
Sunset, as seen from the outskirts of Manipal

== Climate ==
From September to February, the weather in Manipal is tropical with daily temperatures averaging 27 °C (81 °F). From June to mid October, Manipal witnesses one of the most extreme monsoons in the world, with the annual precipitation ranging from 500–560 cm (200–220 in). The months of December to May are hot and humid, with the daily temperatures typically peaking at 35 °C (95 °F). Being away from large urban centers and the highly tropical climate of the town attracts a large number of birds, with 155 different species of birds being recorded in February 2015, including rarities such as the Tickell's Thrush, Blue-eared Kingfisher and Slaty-breasted Rail. The weather, in nutshell, is monsoon for 6 months and hot sunny days for the rest of the year. The nights in manipal are magical because of the pollution-free sky where the stars are visible clearly for you to feel their light and the weather gets pleasant and breezy.

== Transport ==
=== Road ===
Manipal is connected to Mangalore (takes about 75 minutes via road) and towns such as Udupi, Karkala and Kundapur by several private bus services and KSRTC City Buses which run every thirty minutes, the main bus stops are Tiger Circle and Syndicate Circle. The town also has overnight bus services to Bangalore, Hyderabad, Goa and Mumbai.

There are also buses that connect to the famous nearby tourist attractions like Malpe beach, Delta Beach, and Dharmasthala.

Karnataka State Road Transport Corporation runs air-conditioned bus service between Mangalore International Airport and Manipal.

=== Rail ===
The nearest railway station is Udupi station (UD) on the Konkan Railway line, located four kilometers west of Manipal. It has trains connecting Bengaluru, Mumbai, Goa, Kerala, New Delhi, Gujarat, Rajasthan, Uttar Pradesh, Madhya Pradesh, Haryana, Tamil Nadu, Uttarakhand, Punjab. It is about a kilometer away from the National Highway 169A. Mangalore Central (MAQ) is the nearest major railway station and is located in Mangalore, 67 km (42 mi) south of the town.

=== Air ===
The nearest international airport is Mangalore International Airport, which is located around 62 km (39 mi) south of Manipal, connecting it to Indian cities like Mumbai, Bangalore, Hyderabad, Chennai and Delhi, and internationally to the Middle Eastern countries like Oman, Kuwait, Bahrain, Qatar, Saudi Arabia, and United Arab Emirates. Pre-paid taxis are available to transport passengers to and from Manipal and Udupi. KSRTC runs air-conditioned direct bus service between Manipal and Mangaluru International Airport.

Buses also connect Manipal directly to the Kempegowda International Airport in Bangalore, to cater to the large number of international students studying at the university. KSRTC recently started "Flybus", a premium daily bus service from Manipal to Kempegowda International Airport in Bangalore. Buses are also available for travelling to the nearby town of Udupi, where people can switch to the Railway Station for their needs.

== Education ==
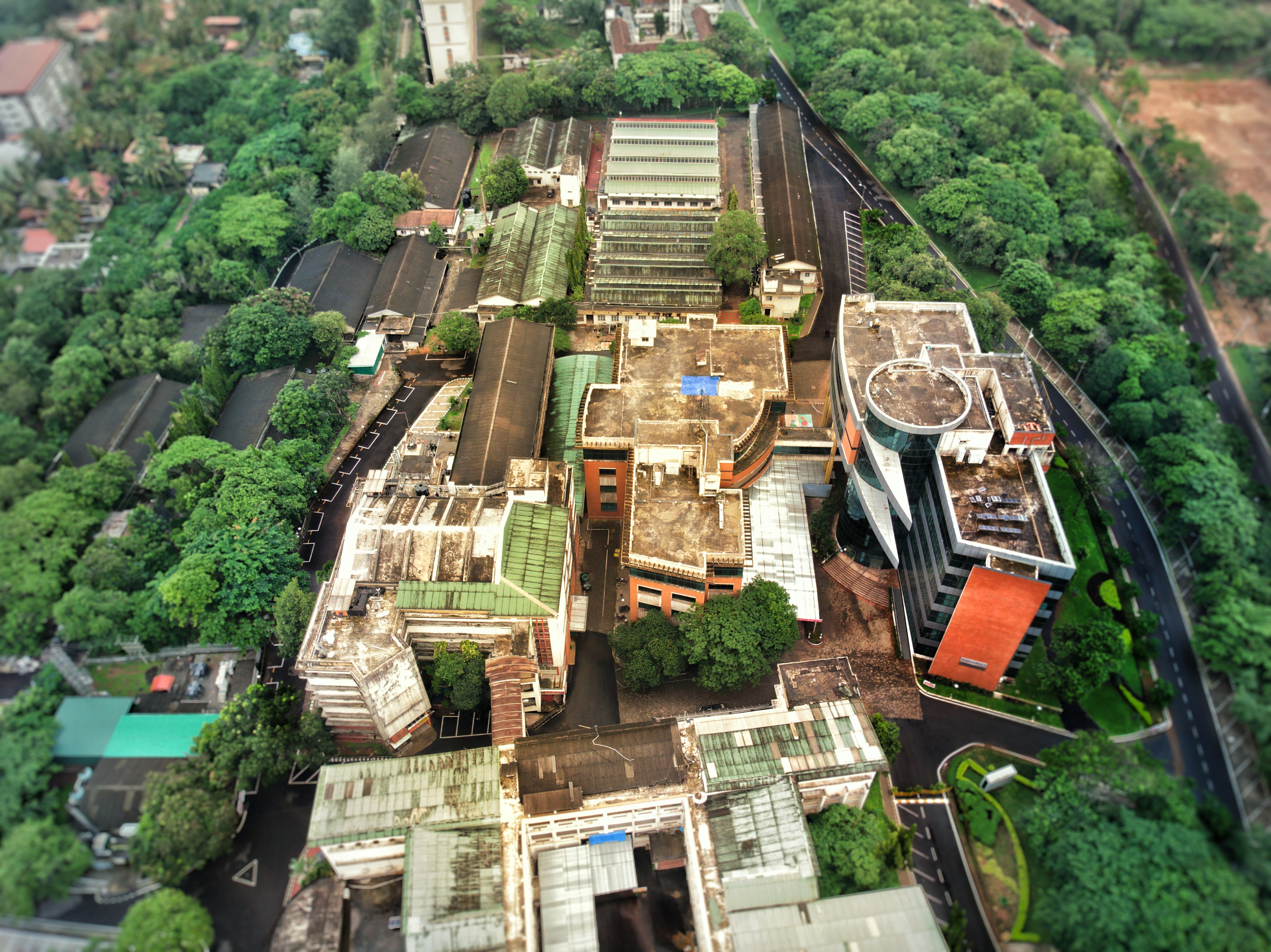
MIT Manipal Campus

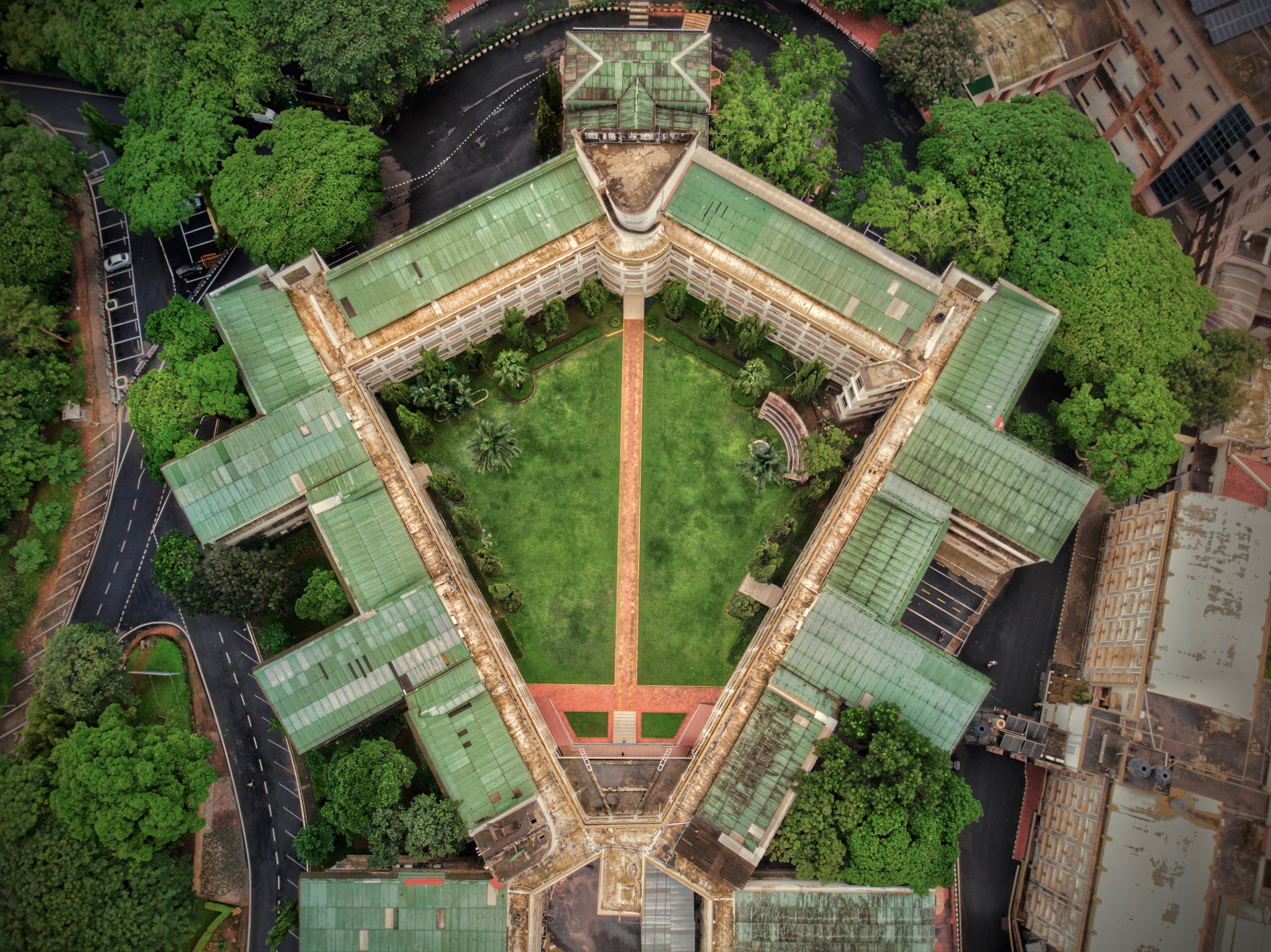
MIT Academic Block 1 - Quadrangle

Manipal gained prominence when Dr. T.M.A. Pai founded the Kasturba Medical College in 1953, the Manipal Institute of Technology in 1957, a popular institute for engineering and 21 other colleges later, all of which became a part of Manipal Academy of Higher Education in 1993. Manipal Academy of Higher Education has been granted the status of Institute of Eminence in the year 2018. It has also been ranked 3rd in the University category and 14th Overall in India by the National Institutional Ranking Framework (NIRF) in 2025. It is ranked 2nd within the state of Karnataka. Pai also founded the Manipal Pre-University College.

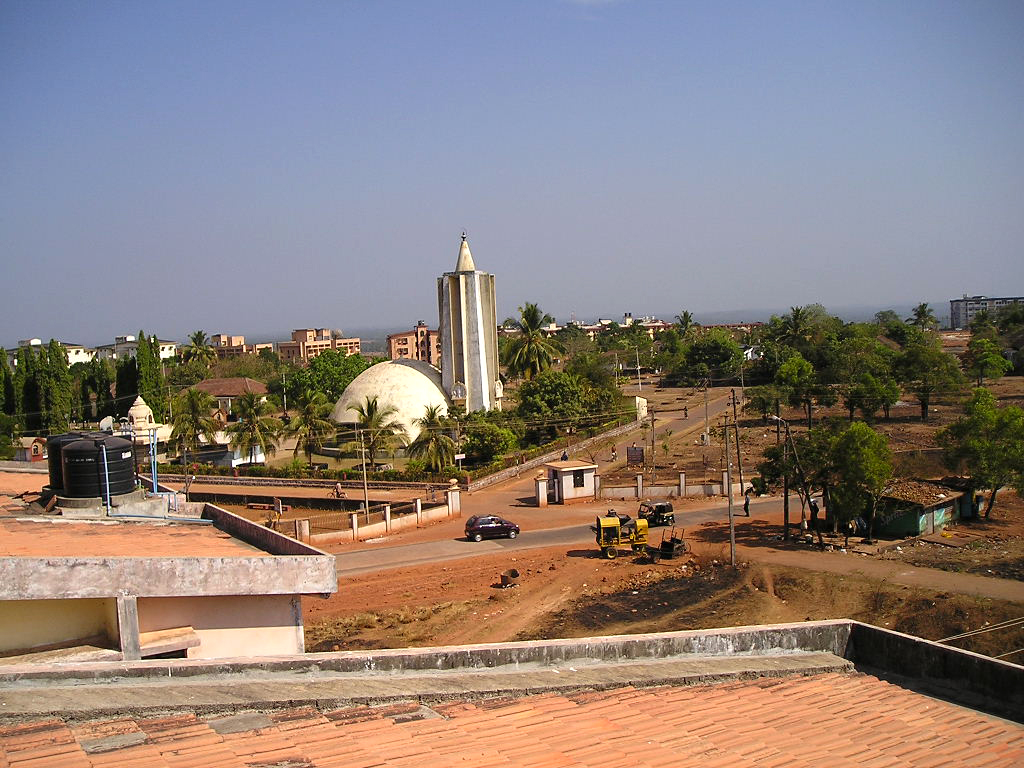
The Venugopal Temple, Manipal, India

Manipal is a major technology and medical research hub, with major conferences and seminars organized almost every week. Since the establishment of Manipal University Technology and Business Incubator (MUTBI), the in-house business incubator of the university, a large number of student-run technology and media startups have sprung up.

== Sister cities ==
- (United States) Loma Linda, California (1982)

== See also ==
- List of twin towns and sister cities in India
- Mangalore
- Udupi
- Chikmagalur
