= List of books banned in India =

This is a list of books or any specific textual material that have been or are banned in India or parts of India.

== Nationwide ==
This section lists books that are banned or once faced a nationwide ban in India (including in British India).

Date	Work	Author	Notes
1909	Hind Swaraj or Indian Home Rule	Mahatma Gandhi	The Gujarati translation of Hind Swaraj was banned by the British authorities on its publication in India.
1924	Rangila Rasul	Pandit M. A. Chamupati or Krishan Prashaad Prataab	In May 1924, this Urdu booklet was published in Lahore. The booklet purportedly described Prophet Muhammad's relationship with women.
1934	Hindu Heaven	Max Wylie	It cannot be brought into India. Max Wylie, the creator The Flying Nun TV show, researched this book while teaching in Lahore. The novel questioned the work of American missionaries in India. It also dealt with the harsh effects of the climate on the missionaries.
1933	Angarey	Various	This collection of stories by Sajjad Zaheer, Ahmed Ali, Rashid Jahan and Mahmud-uz-Zafar was published in 1932. It drew protests from Muslim religious leaders. In 1933, it was banned by the British colonial government.
1936	The Face of Mother India	Katherine Mayo	It cannot be imported into India. In 1927, Gandhi wrote a review of the book titled "Drain Inspector Report" which was published in the Young India.
1936	Old Soldier Sahib	Frank Richards	The book cannot be imported into India. The book is a memoir of the author's time in British India as a veteran soldier.
1937	The Land of the Lingam	Arthur Miles	It cannot be imported into India. The book is about Hinduism, caste and phallicism.
1940	Mysterious India	Moki Singh	The book cannot be imported into India. The book purportedly contained stereotypes.
1945	The Scented Garden: Anthropology of the Sex Life in the Levant	Bernhard Stern	This book cannot be imported into India. This is a book about sexual practices and marriage rites of the people of Middle East (Levant). The book was allegedly sexually explicit.
1950	Pakistan-Pasmanzarwa Peshmanzar	Hameed Anwar	This book, originally in Urdu, cannot be imported into India.
1950	Cease-Fire	Agha Babar	This book, originally in Urdu, cannot be imported into India.
1950	Khaak aur Khoon	Nusseim Hajazi	This book, originally in Urdu, cannot be imported into India.
1952	Chadramohini		This book, originally in Urdu, cannot be imported into India.
1952	Marka-e-Somnath	Maulana Muhammad Sadiq Hussain Sahab Sadiq Siddiqui Sardanvi	This book, originally in Urdu, is a Pakistani treatise on Somnath and it cannot be imported into India.
1954	Bhupat Singh	Kaluwank Ravatwank	This book, originally in Gujarati, cannot be imported into India.
1954	What has Religion done for Mankind		This book cannot be imported into India. This is a book published by the Watch Tower Bible and Tract Society. This book tries to refute Eastern religions.
1955	Rama Retold	Aubrey Menen	This book cannot be imported into India. It was a play which was a spoof of the Ramayana. It was one of the first books to be banned in independent India. The American edition was simply called The Ramayana.
1955	Dark Urge	Robert W. Taylor	This book cannot be imported into India.
1958	Captive Kashmir: Story of a Betrayed and Enslaved People	Aziz Beg	This book is highly critical of India's stand on Kashmir. This book cannot be imported into India.
1959	The Heart of India	Alexander Campbell	This book cannot be imported into India. Alexander Campbell was Time magazine's New Delhi correspondent. The book is a fictionalized and humorous account of Indian bureaucracy and economic policies.
1960	The Lotus and the Robot	Arthur Koestler	This book contains the author's experiences in India and Japan. The book was highly critical of the cultures of both nations. The book was banned for its negative portrayal of Gandhi.
1962	Nine Hours to Rama	Stanley Wolpert	This book cannot be imported into India. The book and the movie based on it, both were banned in India. The book points to the lapse in security.
1963	Nepal	Toni Hagen	This book cannot be imported into India.
1963	Ayesha	Kurt Frischler	This book is alleged to hurt Muslim sentiments. This book cannot be imported into India. The original German title was Aischa: Mohammed's Lieblingfrau (Aischa: Mohammed's Favorite Wife).
1963	Unarmed Victory	Bertrand Russell	The book dealt with the Sino-Indian War and showed involved political leaders in poor light.
1964	An Area of Darkness	V. S. Naipaul	Banned for its negative portrayal of India and its people.
1968	The Jewel in the Lotus	Allen Edwardes	This book cannot be imported into India. Allen Edwardes was the pen-name of a scholar who wrote on Middle East and Oriental erotica.
1969	The Evolution of the British Empire and Commonwealth from the American Revolution	Alfred LeRoy Burt	This book cannot be imported into India.
1969	A Struggle between two lines over the question of How to Deal with U.S. Imperialism	Hsiu-chu Fan	This book cannot be imported into India.
1970	Man from Moscow	Greville Wynne	This book cannot be imported into India. Greville Wynne was a courier for the British Secret Intelligence Service (MI6). The book is about his involvement with Oleg Penkovsky. The book was banned for purportedly misrepresenting Indian policies.
1971	Nehru: A Political Biography	Michael Edwardes	This book cannot be imported into India. The book purportedly contained grievous factual errors.
1975	Early Islam	Desmond Stewart	This book cannot be imported into India. The book purportedly contained grievous factual errors.
1975	Quotations from Chairman Mao Zedong	Compiled and excerpted from the works of Mao Zedong	Banned following the Naxalite Uprising and the first phase of the Naxalite Movement led by Charu Majumdar.
1976	India Independent	Charles Bettelheim	This book cannot be imported into India. It was banned for criticising the policies of the Indian government.
1978	China's Foreign Relations Since 1949	Alan Lawrence	This book cannot be imported into India.
1979	Who killed Gandhi	Lourenço de Salvador	This book cannot be imported into India. The book was considered inflammatory and ill-researched.
1983	The Price of Power: Kissinger and Nixon in the White House	Seymour Hersh	Briefly banned for alleging Morarji Desai to be a CIA informer. The book claimed that Morarji Desai was paid US$20,000 per year, starting from the time of Lyndon B. Johnson. Desai obtained an injunction from the Bombay High Court for a temporary ban and sued for damages worth US$5 million in US.
1984	Smash and Grab: Annexation of Sikkim	Sunanda K. Datta-Ray	The book dealt with India's annexation of Sikkim. The Delhi High Court had stopped its publication after a political officer station in Gangtok at the time filed a defamation suit. The book was later allowed for release.
1988	The Satanic Verses	Salman Rushdie	This book cannot be imported into India. Import ban was imposed after Muslim groups protested that it was blasphemous and hurt their religious sentiments. India was the first country to ban this book.
1989	Soft Target: How the Indian Intelligence Service Penetrated Canada	Zuhair Kashmeri and Brian McAndrew	The book claims that the Indian intelligence agencies penetrated the Canadian Sikh community, Royal Canadian Mounted Police (RCMP) and Canadian Security Intelligence Service (CSIS) to discredit the demand for a separate Sikh state.
1991	Understanding Islam through Hadis	Ram Swarup	The book, originally published in 1982, was banned for its critique of political Islam.
2005	The True Furqan	Al Saffee, Al Mahdee	Banned for purportedly mocking Islam. The book has been allegedly written by a Christian evangelical group to proselytise Muslims. The import of this book is strictly prohibited.
2014	Santsurya Tukaram and Loksakha Dnyaneshwar	Anand Yadav	A Pune court ordered the copies of the books to be destroyed in June 2014. The complaint Jaisingh More had claimed that the book was derogatory to Tukaram and Dnyaneshwar. The publishers defended the book and the author's daughter stated that they will appeal in a higher court.
2020	Building a Happy Family	Raageshwari Loomba Swaroop	This book initially cannot be imported into India due to shipping restriction as a result of COVID-19 Pandemic. While the book originally published in the UK and was released digitally, physical books were not arrived until 2021.

== Statewide ==
This section lists books that were banned by a state government. The Section 95 of the Code of Criminal Procedure, 1973 allows the state governments to declare any publication as forfeit.

Date	Work	Author	State(s)	Notes
1944	Satyarth Prakash	Dayananda Saraswati	Sindh	Satyartha Prakash was banned in some princely states and in Sindh in 1944 and is still banned in Sindh. In 2008 two Indian Muslims, Usman Ghani and Mohammad Khalil Khan of Sadar Bazar, Delhi, following the fatwa of Mufti Mukarram Ahmed, the Imam of Fatehpuri Masjid in Delhi, urged the Delhi High Court to ban Satyarth Prakash. However, the court dismissed the petition and commented "A suit by Hindus against the Quran or by Muslims against Gita or Satyarth Prakash claiming relief... are in fact, meant to play mischief in the society."
1969	Ramayana: A True Reading	Periyar E. V. Ramasamy	Uttar Pradesh	The Hindi version of the book, Sachchi Ramayana, was banned by the state government and all copies were seized in December 1969. The publisher challenged the decision in the Allahabad High Court. The court nullified the ban and asked the government to return all copies to the publisher. The state government challenged the High Court in the Supreme Court. On 16 September 1976, Supreme Court declared the ban to be illegal. However, the government ignored the court decisions and managed to stop sales of the book, until 1995. In 1995, after the political party Bahujan Samaj Party (BSP) came to power, the book was widely published for the Periyar mela held in September 1995.
2001	Bhavsagar Granth	Followers of Baba Bhaniara	Punjab	Banned by Parkash Singh Badal-led Punjab government in 2001 for allegedly insulting the Sikh faith. The state arrested the people who were found in possession of the book, and confiscated its copies. In November 2008, the Supreme Court of India overturned the ban, stating that the Punjab government was allowed to issue a fresh ban, if needed. The Punjab Government then banned the book on 15 December 2008.
2003	Dwikhandito	Taslima Nasrin	West Bengal	The CPI(M) government banned the book on 28 November 2003 fearing that book could incite communal discord. In November 2003, the Calcutta High Court put out an injunction against publication after a poet, Syed Hasmat Jalal, filed a 110 million INR defamation suit. On 22 September 2005, the court lifted the ban.
2004	Shivaji: Hindu King in Islamic India	James Laine	Maharashtra	In January 2004, a mob alleging disparaging remarks made about Shivaji attacked Bhandarkar Oriental Research Institute where Laine had researched the book. Several rare manuscripts were destroyed in the process. On 14 January, the state government run by the Congress Party under Sushil Kumar Shinde banned the book. In 2007, the Bombay High Court revoked the ban. The state government challenged the decision in the Supreme Court. Supreme Court upheld the previous decision and lifted the ban in 2010.
2006	The Epic of Shivaji: A Translation and Study of Kavindra Paramananda's Sivabharata	James Laine	Maharashtra	The book was banned for allegedly containing derogatory references on grounds that it could cause a law and order problem.
2006	The Da Vinci Code	Dan Brown	Nagaland	The book was banned by the government for allegedly containing blasphemous remarks about Jesus.
2007	Islam: A Concept of Political World Invasion	R. V. Bhasin	Maharashtra	The book was released in 2003. It was banned by the Congress government in 2007 ground that it contained derogatory remarks about Islam and Prophet Mohammad. In 2010, Bombay High Court upheld the ban. The decision was challenged in the Supreme Court but it rejected the appeal.
2009	Jinnah: India, Partition, Independence	Jaswant Singh	Gujarat	Banned in Gujarat but overturned. The book was on banned on 19 August 2009, for containing defamatory references to Sardar Vallabhbhai Patel. Jaswant Singh was also expelled from his political party, BJP, for writing this book. On 4 September, the Gujarat High Court revoked the ban.
2011	Great Soul: Mahatma Gandhi and His Struggle With India	Joseph Lelyveld	Gujarat	The biographical book was claimed to have that Mahatma Gandhi was a bisexual, but its author Joseph Lelyveld denied this claim. It is banned in the state of Gujarat (where Gandhi was born) on 31 March 2011. The Union Law Minister Veerappa Moily hinted that the Centre may also ban the book. Gandhi's grandsons, Tushar Gandhi, Rajmohan Gandhi and Gopalkrishna Gandhi, expressed opposition to the ban proposal. On 4 April, Moily ruled out the ban.
2013	Meendezhum Pandiyar Varalaru (மீண்டெழும் பாண்டியர் வரலாறு) (meaning: Resurgence of Pandiyan History)	K. Senthil Mallar	Tamil Nadu	The Tamil Nadu government banned this Tamil book on 30 May 2013 on grounds that it may cause violence and promote discord among communities. The book allegedly claims the Dalit community called Pallar, were among the rulers of the Pandya kingdom. The author has appealed in the Madras High Court against the ban.
2017	The Adivasi Will Not Dance: Stories	Hansda Sowvendra Shekhar	Jharkhand	On 11 August 2017, the government of Jharkhand banned The Adivasi Will Not Dance: Stories and summarily suspended the author from his job, on the grounds that the book portrayed Adivasi women and Santhal culture in a bad light. The key complainants appear to have been the ruling party in Jharkhand, the Bharatiya Janata Party, the opposition party Jharkhand Mukti Morcha, and an academic at Jamia Millia Islamia. The government's actions were widely criticised. The ban on The Adivasi Will Not Dance: Stories was removed in December 2017 and Shekhar's suspension was removed and he was reinstated into his job in 2018.
2025	Human Rights Violations in Kashmir	Piotr Balcerowicz and Agnieszka Kuszewska	Jammu and Kashmir	In August 2025, a notification was issued by Chandraker Bharti, Principal Secretary of the Jammu and Kashmir Home Department, saying: “…it has come to the notice of the Government, that certain literature propagates false narrative and secessionism in Jammu and Kashmir… This literature would deeply impact the psyche of youth by promoting (a) culture of grievance, victimhood and terrorist heroism.”
2025	Kashmiris Fight for Freedom	Mohd Yosuf Saraf	Jammu and Kashmir	In August 2025, a notification was issued by Chandraker Bharti, Principal Secretary of the Jammu and Kashmir Home Department, saying: “…it has come to the notice of the Government, that certain literature propagates false narrative and secessionism in Jammu and Kashmir… This literature would deeply impact the psyche of youth by promoting (a) culture of grievance, victimhood and terrorist heroism.”
2025	Colonizing Kashmir: State-Building under Indian occupation	Hafsa Kanjwal	Jammu and Kashmir	In August 2025, a notification was issued by Chandraker Bharti, Principal Secretary of the Jammu and Kashmir Home Department, saying: “…it has come to the notice of the Government, that certain literature propagates false narrative and secessionism in Jammu and Kashmir… This literature would deeply impact the psyche of youth by promoting (a) culture of grievance, victimhood and terrorist heroism.”
2025	Kashmir Politics and Plebiscite	Dr. Abdul Gockhami Jabbar	Jammu and Kashmir	In August 2025, a notification was issued by Chandraker Bharti, Principal Secretary of the Jammu and Kashmir Home Department, saying: “…it has come to the notice of the Government, that certain literature propagates false narrative and secessionism in Jammu and Kashmir… This literature would deeply impact the psyche of youth by promoting (a) culture of grievance, victimhood and terrorist heroism.”
2025	Do You Remember Kunan Poshpora?	Essar Batool & others	Jammu and Kashmir	In August 2025, a notification was issued by Chandraker Bharti, Principal Secretary of the Jammu and Kashmir Home Department, saying: “…it has come to the notice of the Government, that certain literature propagates false narrative and secessionism in Jammu and Kashmir… This literature would deeply impact the psyche of youth by promoting (a) culture of grievance, victimhood and terrorist heroism.”
2025	Mujahid ki Azan	Imam Hasan Al-Bana Shaheed, edited by Maulan Mohammad Enayatullah Subhani	Jammu and Kashmir	In August 2025, a notification was issued by Chandraker Bharti, Principal Secretary of the Jammu and Kashmir Home Department, saying: “…it has come to the notice of the Government, that certain literature propagates false narrative and secessionism in Jammu and Kashmir… This literature would deeply impact the psyche of youth by promoting (a) culture of grievance, victimhood and terrorist heroism.”
2025	Al Jihadul fil Islam	Moulana Moudadi	Jammu and Kashmir	In August 2025, a notification was issued by Chandraker Bharti, Principal Secretary of the Jammu and Kashmir Home Department, saying: “…it has come to the notice of the Government, that certain literature propagates false narrative and secessionism in Jammu and Kashmir… This literature would deeply impact the psyche of youth by promoting (a) culture of grievance, victimhood and terrorist heroism.”
2025	Independent Kashmir	Christopher Snedden	Jammu and Kashmir	In August 2025, a notification was issued by Chandraker Bharti, Principal Secretary of the Jammu and Kashmir Home Department, saying: “…it has come to the notice of the Government, that certain literature propagates false narrative and secessionism in Jammu and Kashmir… This literature would deeply impact the psyche of youth by promoting (a) culture of grievance, victimhood and terrorist heroism.”
2025	Resisting Occupation in Kashmir	Haley Duschinski, Mona Bhan, Ather Zia and Cynthia Mahmood	Jammu and Kashmir	In August 2025, a notification was issued by Chandraker Bharti, Principal Secretary of the Jammu and Kashmir Home Department, saying: “…it has come to the notice of the Government, that certain literature propagates false narrative and secessionism in Jammu and Kashmir… This literature would deeply impact the psyche of youth by promoting (a) culture of grievance, victimhood and terrorist heroism.”
2025	Between Democracy & Nation: Gender and Militarisation in Kashmir	Seema Kazi	Jammu and Kashmir	In August 2025, a notification was issued by Chandraker Bharti, Principal Secretary of the Jammu and Kashmir Home Department, saying: “…it has come to the notice of the Government, that certain literature propagates false narrative and secessionism in Jammu and Kashmir… This literature would deeply impact the psyche of youth by promoting (a) culture of grievance, victimhood and terrorist heroism.”
2025	Contested Lands	Sumantra Bose	Jammu and Kashmir	In August 2025, a notification was issued by Chandraker Bharti, Principal Secretary of the Jammu and Kashmir Home Department, saying: “…it has come to the notice of the Government, that certain literature propagates false narrative and secessionism in Jammu and Kashmir… This literature would deeply impact the psyche of youth by promoting (a) culture of grievance, victimhood and terrorist heroism.”
2025	In Search of a Future: The Story of Kashmir	David Devadas	Jammu and Kashmir	In August 2025, a notification was issued by Chandraker Bharti, Principal Secretary of the Jammu and Kashmir Home Department, saying: “…it has come to the notice of the Government, that certain literature propagates false narrative and secessionism in Jammu and Kashmir… This literature would deeply impact the psyche of youth by promoting (a) culture of grievance, victimhood and terrorist heroism.”
2025	Kashmir in Conflict: India, Pakistan and the Unending War	Victoria Schofield	Jammu and Kashmir	In August 2025, a notification was issued by Chandraker Bharti, Principal Secretary of the Jammu and Kashmir Home Department, saying: “…it has come to the notice of the Government, that certain literature propagates false narrative and secessionism in Jammu and Kashmir… This literature would deeply impact the psyche of youth by promoting (a) culture of grievance, victimhood and terrorist heroism.”
2025	The Kashmir Dispute: 1947–2012	A G Noorani	Jammu and Kashmir	In August 2025, a notification was issued by Chandraker Bharti, Principal Secretary of the Jammu and Kashmir Home Department, saying: “…it has come to the notice of the Government, that certain literature propagates false narrative and secessionism in Jammu and Kashmir… This literature would deeply impact the psyche of youth by promoting (a) culture of grievance, victimhood and terrorist heroism.”
2025	Kashmir at the Crossroads: Inside a 21st-Century Conflict	Sumantra Bose	Jammu and Kashmir	In August 2025, a notification was issued by Chandraker Bharti, Principal Secretary of the Jammu and Kashmir Home Department, saying: “…it has come to the notice of the Government, that certain literature propagates false narrative and secessionism in Jammu and Kashmir… This literature would deeply impact the psyche of youth by promoting (a) culture of grievance, victimhood and terrorist heroism.”
2025	A Dismantled State: The Untold Story of Kashmir after Article 370	Anuradha Bhasin	Jammu and Kashmir	In August 2025, a notification was issued by Chandraker Bharti, Principal Secretary of the Jammu and Kashmir Home Department, saying: “…it has come to the notice of the Government, that certain literature propagates false narrative and secessionism in Jammu and Kashmir… This literature would deeply impact the psyche of youth by promoting (a) culture of grievance, victimhood and terrorist heroism.”
2025	Resisting Disappearance: Military Occupation & Women’s Activism in Kashmir	Ather Zia	Jammu and Kashmir	In August 2025, a notification was issued by Chandraker Bharti, Principal Secretary of the Jammu and Kashmir Home Department, saying: “…it has come to the notice of the Government, that certain literature propagates false narrative and secessionism in Jammu and Kashmir… This literature would deeply impact the psyche of youth by promoting (a) culture of grievance, victimhood and terrorist heroism.”
2025	Confronting Terrorism	Edited by Maroof Raza	Jammu and Kashmir	In August 2025, a notification was issued by Chandraker Bharti, Principal Secretary of the Jammu and Kashmir Home Department, saying: “…it has come to the notice of the Government, that certain literature propagates false narrative and secessionism in Jammu and Kashmir… This literature would deeply impact the psyche of youth by promoting (a) culture of grievance, victimhood and terrorist heroism.”
2025	Freedom in Captivity: Negotiations of belonging along Kashmiri Frontier	Radhika Gupta	Jammu and Kashmir	In August 2025, a notification was issued by Chandraker Bharti, Principal Secretary of the Jammu and Kashmir Home Department, saying: “…it has come to the notice of the Government, that certain literature propagates false narrative and secessionism in Jammu and Kashmir… This literature would deeply impact the psyche of youth by promoting (a) culture of grievance, victimhood and terrorist heroism.”
2025	Kashmir: The Case for Freedom	Tariq Ali, Hilal Bhatt, Angana P. Chatterji, Pankaj Mishra and Arundhati Roy	Jammu and Kashmir	In August 2025, a notification was issued by Chandraker Bharti, Principal Secretary of the Jammu and Kashmir Home Department, saying: “…it has come to the notice of the Government, that certain literature propagates false narrative and secessionism in Jammu and Kashmir… This literature would deeply impact the psyche of youth by promoting (a) culture of grievance, victimhood and terrorist heroism.”
2025	Azadi	Arundhati Roy	Jammu and Kashmir	In August 2025, a notification was issued by Chandraker Bharti, Principal Secretary of the Jammu and Kashmir Home Department, saying: “…it has come to the notice of the Government, that certain literature propagates false narrative and secessionism in Jammu and Kashmir… This literature would deeply impact the psyche of youth by promoting (a) culture of grievance, victimhood and terrorist heroism.”
2025	USA and Kashmir	Dr. Shamshad Shan	Jammu and Kashmir	In August 2025, a notification was issued by Chandraker Bharti, Principal Secretary of the Jammu and Kashmir Home Department, saying: “…it has come to the notice of the Government, that certain literature propagates false narrative and secessionism in Jammu and Kashmir… This literature would deeply impact the psyche of youth by promoting (a) culture of grievance, victimhood and terrorist heroism.”
2025	Law & Conflict Resolution in Kashmir	Piotr Balcerowicz and Agnieszka Kuszewska	Jammu and Kashmir	In August 2025, a notification was issued by Chandraker Bharti, Principal Secretary of the Jammu and Kashmir Home Department, saying: “…it has come to the notice of the Government, that certain literature propagates false narrative and secessionism in Jammu and Kashmir… This literature would deeply impact the psyche of youth by promoting (a) culture of grievance, victimhood and terrorist heroism.”
2025	Tarikh-i-Siyasat Kashmir	Dr. Afaq	Jammu and Kashmir	In August 2025, a notification was issued by Chandraker Bharti, Principal Secretary of the Jammu and Kashmir Home Department, saying: “…it has come to the notice of the Government, that certain literature propagates false narrative and secessionism in Jammu and Kashmir… This literature would deeply impact the psyche of youth by promoting (a) culture of grievance, victimhood and terrorist heroism.”
2025	Kashmir & the Future of South Asia	Edited by Sugata Bose and Ayesha Jalal	Jammu and Kashmir	In August 2025, a notification was issued by Chandraker Bharti, Principal Secretary of the Jammu and Kashmir Home Department, saying: “…it has come to the notice of the Government, that certain literature propagates false narrative and secessionism in Jammu and Kashmir… This literature would deeply impact the psyche of youth by promoting (a) culture of grievance, victimhood and terrorist heroism.”

== Other challenged books ==
This section lists books that have been legally challenged to impose a ban or to exclude from a syllabus. Some books listed here are unavailable or were unavailable for some time in India or parts of it, due to pending court decisions or voluntary withdrawal by the publishers.

Date	Work	Author	Notes
1892	Risala-i-Jihad	Pandit Lekh Ram	Pandit Lekh Ram's Risala-i-Jihad was challenged and a ban was attempted. Risala-i-Jihad ya'ri Din-i-Muhammad ki Bunyad (A Treatise on waging holy war, or the foundation of the Muhammadan Religion) caused a considerable outcry, when it was published in 1892, leading to a prophecy by Mirza Ghulam Ahmad.
1985	Quran	Religious text	On 20 July 1984, H.K. Chakraborty wrote to the Secretary, Department of Home Government of West Bengal, demanding the ban of the Quran. Chakraborty thereafter with Chandmal Chopra wrote to the Department of Home Government of West Bengal on 16 March 1985. Chopra then filed a writ Petition at the High Court. Chandmal Chopra tried to obtain an order banning the Quran, by filing a Writ Petition at the Calcutta High Court on 29 March 1985. The petition claimed that Sections 153A and 295A of the Indian Penal Code, and Section 95 of the Criminal Procedure Code were often used by Muslims to ban or proscribe publications critical of Islam, and stated that "so far it had been the privilege of the Peoples of the Book to ban and burn the sacred literature of the Pagans." Chandmal Chopra thought that the Koran "on grounds of religion promotes disharmony, feeling of enmity, hatred and ill-will between different religious communities and incite people to commit violence and disturb public tranquility..." The Telegraph of 9 May 1985 reported that the Union Government would make itself a party in the case, and the Union law minister Ashoke Sen and the attorney-general of the Government of India were going to take action against the case. Muslim lawyers after a meeting condemned the case. According to The Telegraph of 10 May, the Chief Minister of West Bengal called the petition "a despicable act". Other politicians in the Lok Sabha at New Delhi, and the Minister of State for Law condemned the Petition. Pakistan's minister of state for religious and minority affairs claimed that the petition was the "worst example of religious intolerance", and he urged the Indian government to "follow the example of Pakistan" in ensuring freedom of religion. The petition was however dismissed in May 1985. The Attorney-General of the Government of India and the Advocate-General of West Bengal appeared in the case and argued against Chopra's petition. On 18 June 1985 Chandmal Chopra filed a review petition, which was dismissed on 21 June.
1993	Hindu View of Christianity and Islam	Ram Swarup	Ram Swarup's Hindu View of Christianity and Islam was challenged by Syed Shahabuddin (who previously effected the ban on Satanic Verses). Indian authorities were to impose a ban on the book, Syed Shahabuddin asked that the government have the book examined "from the point of view of banning it under the law of the land."
1995	The Moor's Last Sigh	Salman Rushdie	The book contained a character resembling Balasaheb Thackeray, the leader of the right-wing party Shiv Sena. The book faced protests from the party. The book also contained a dog named, Jawaharlal, named after India's first Prime Minister, Jawaharlal Nehru. Prime Minister P. V. Narasimha Rao unofficially banned the book. In September 1995, the local publishers Rupa & Co. were asked to stop selling the book while it was being reviewed. Rupa & Co. decided to approach the Supreme Court of India in response. The court the declared the ban unconstitutional in February 1996. However, book sellers were reluctant to stock the book in Maharashtra, the home of Shiv Sena, due to the fear of vandalism.
1997	The God of Small Things	Arundhati Roy	A lawyer named Sabu Thomas from Kerala filed an obscenity case against the author, claiming that Chapter 21 contains obscene scenes.
1998	The Polyester Prince: The Rise of Dhirubhai Ambani	Hamish McDonald	This unofficial biography of Dhirubhai Ambani never went to print because HarperCollins anticipated legal action from the Ambani family.
2000	Towards Freedom	Sumit Sarkar and K. N. Panikkar	The 10-volume history book project was halted by the Indian Council of Historical Research in early 2000, allegedly because it showed Hindu Mahasabha in a badlight. The project was revived in 2004.
2001	The Myth of the Holy Cow	Dwijendra Narayan Jha	A preview of the book was posted on a website initially which triggered the controversy. A spokesperson for the Vishwa Hindu Parishad stated that the book was an attempt to insult Hindus. The book allegedly said that beef was eaten by ancient Indians. The author received anonymous threat calls and had to be provided a police escort. A civil court in Andhra Pradesh put a temporary stay order on the book until verdict. Pushpesh Pant supported the book by stating that the evidence exists in historical and mythological texts.
2002	Five Past Midnight in Bhopal	Dominique Lapierre and Javier Moro	The book is a dramatized account of the Bhopal disaster. In 2002, Swaraj Puri filed a defamation suit against the authors worth US$10 million. Puri, who was the police commissioner of Bhopal during the disaster is mentioned in the book. In 2009, the court put an order to halt publication of the book. But, the Madhya Pradesh High Court revoked the order later.
2008	The Lives of Sri Aurobindo	Peter Heehs	On 5 November 2004, the Odisha High Court put a stay order on the release of the book, after a petition was filed. The petitioner alleged that the book is blasphemous in nature and defamatory regarding Sri Aurobindo's character.
2010	The Red Sari (El Sari Rojo)	Javier Moro	The book was originally published in October 2010 in Spanish. The book is a fictional novel allegedly based on Sonia Gandhi. Moro claimed that Congress lawyers and spokesperson Abhishek Singhvi had written to his publishers demanding them to withdraw the book from shops. Abhishek Singhvi claimed that the book violated a person's privacy for monetary gain. The book was finally released in India in January 2015.
2010	Such A Long Journey	Rohinton Mistry	On 4 October 2010, this 1990 Booker nominated book was removed from the Bachelor of Arts (English) syllabus of the Mumbai University, after Bharatiya Vidyarthi Sena, the student-wing of the Shiv Sena protested. The book allegedly contained anti-Shiv Sena passages and remarks derogatory to Maharastrians. The protests were led by Aditya Thackeray. Mistry later expressed his dismay in an open letter to the university.
2013	Dhundi	Yogesh Master	The author of the Kannada novel was arrested on 29 August 2013, after several Hindu organisations accused the book of containing objectionable material against the god Ganesha. The author was charged under Section 295 A and 298 of the Indian Penal Code. The complaint was filed by Sri Ram Sene leader Pramod Muthalik, and others.
2014	Sahara: The Untold Story	Tamal Bandyopadhyay	Sahara India Pariwar moved Calcutta High Court in December 2013 seeking a stay and filed a Rs. 2 billion defamation suit against the author. In January 2014, a stay order was issued by the court. In April, both the parties reached an out of court settlement following which the book was published with a disclaimer given by Sahara.
2014	The Descent of Air India	Jitendra Bhargava	The publisher, Bloomsbury India, agreed to withdraw all copies of the book, after former Aviation Minister Praful Patel filed a defamation suit in a Mumbai court. The publisher also issued a public apology.
2015	Madhurobhagan (One Part Woman)	Perumal Murugan	The writer asked publishers to withdraw all his books from the market and announced that he was giving up writing on 13 January 2015. The BJP, RSS and other Hindu groups had protested his book, and demanded its ban and his arrest. They had alleged that he had portrayed the Kailasanathar temple in Tiruchengode and its women devotees in bad light. The English translation of the book is known as One Part Woman.
2015	Korkai	Joe D'Cruz	A complaint was filed against the author in June 2015 in a Thoothukudi, Tamil Nadu court alleging the novel had portrayed fishermen, Christianity, priests and nuns in bad light.
2021	Sunrise Over Ayodhya: Nationhood in Our Times	Salman Khurshid	A petition was filed in the Delhi High Court seeking a ban on the sale of the book. The book allegedly compares Hindutva to radical groups like the Islamic State and the Boko Haram. The Court rejected petition.

== See also ==
- List of films banned in India
- Censorship in India
