= T. A. Pai =

Indian banker and politician

Tonse Ananth Pai
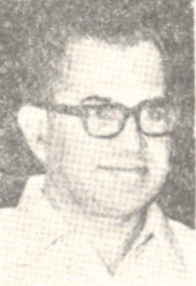
- Born: 17 January 1922
- Died: 29 May 1981 (aged 59)
- Education: Sydenham College of Commerce and Economics, Mumbai
- Occupations: Banker; Politician
- Parent: Tonse Upendra Ananth Pai
- Relatives: Ramesh Pai (Brother); T. M. A. Pai (Uncle); Ramdas Pai (Cousin)

Tonse Ananth Pai (abbreviated: T. A. Pai), (17 January 1922 – 29 May 1981) was an Indian banker and politician, who was responsible for the success of Syndicate Bank as its general manager and later as chairman. He was also the founder of T. A. Pai Management Institute.

== Early life and career ==
He was the eldest of four sons of Tonse Upendra Pai. He was the nephew of Dr. T. M. A. Pai. After his early childhood spent in Udupi district, he graduated in commerce from Sydenham College of Commerce and Economics in 1943. He worked at Syndicate Bank, which had been established by one of his relatives and in 1970 the Government of India appointed him as the chairman of Life Insurance Corporation after Syndicate Bank got nationalized. He was the first chairman of the Indian Institute of Management Bangalore.

== Political career ==
He was elected to the Rajya Sabha in 1972 and was appointed the Union Minister for Railways. In 1973, he was given the responsibility for the newly created Ministry of Heavy Industries, and subsequently, additional charge of the Ministry of Steel and Mines. Pai took over the responsibility of the Ministry of Industry and Civil Supplies in 1974.

He represented Udupi Lok Sabha constituency in 1977 as an Indian National Congress candidate. In 1979 when D. Devaraj Urs parted ways with Indian National Congress and created Indian National Congress (U), Pai joined him and moved to the new party. In the 1980 Indian general election he contested again from Udupi (Lok Sabha constituency) as a nominee of Indian National Congress (U) and lost elections to Oscar Fernandes.

In 1977, Pai was one among the three ministers from the cabinet of Indira Gandhi who were examined by Shah Commission on emergency excesses. Pai gave testimony against Indira Gandhi saying the ministry was 'under siege' and he protested the decisions. The 1998 book by Australian journalist, Hamish McDonald titled The Polyester Prince made references about Pai and his relationship with Dhirubhai Ambani. The book that was banned in India accused that there was gross tax minimization done during Pai's tenure by Reliance Industries by using a company named MyNylon Ltd. a private limited company incorporated in 1973 by Pai family at Karnataka.

== Awards ==
He was conferred the Padma Bhushan by the Government of India in 1972. He was awarded the degree of D.Litt. by the Karnataka University in 1973. The Andhra University decorated him with the degree of D.Litt. in 1975.
