= Sectarian violence =

Violence motivated by conflict between sects of ideology or religion

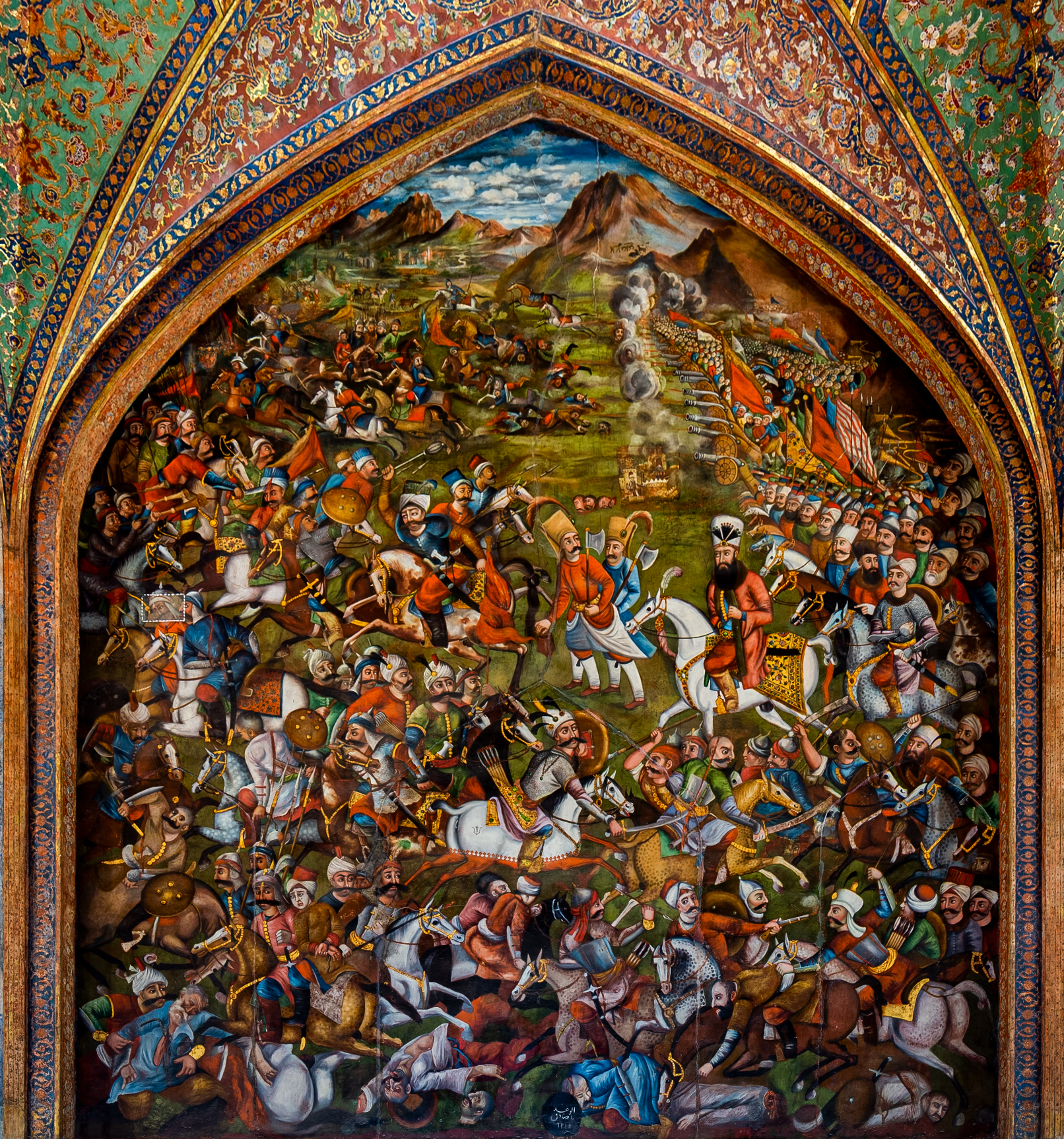
Sectarian battle between Sunnis and Twelver Shias at the Battle of Chaldiran (Ottoman and Safavidwars)

Sectarian violence or sectarian strife is a form of religious violence which is inspired by sectarianism, that is, discrimination, hatred or prejudice between different sects of a particular mode of an ideology or different sects of a religion within a nation or community. Religious segregation often plays a role in sectarian violence. The concept can be applied to both inter- as well as intra-group violence and is context dependent for instance considering political, social, and cultural factors. Strategies for ending violence include the inter-group contact theory and the democratic peace theory.

== Conceptual dynamics of sectarian violence ==
A sect, in one of its oldest definitions by Max Weber, is a form of social-religious grouping that co-exists along religious institutions. Sectarianism therefore is the adherence to one of such groups based on the religious values that one ascribes to them. This therefore constitutes religious sectarianism. However, sectarianism does not need to be attached to religion per se. It can also be connected to a moralised identification with a political group which would thereby transform it into political sectarianism. Both definitions therefore entail the creation of an in- and out-group perspective that hinges upon identity.

Furthermore, such groups are not necessarily homogenous in their internal opinions or characteristics. The differences within and among these groups makes then susceptible to conflict both across and within groups. For instance, as according to Raymond Hinnebusch, a patrimonial regime within a multi-sectarian society may favour elites which in turn may exploit sectarian dynamics to foster inter-sectarian conflict which in turn would lead to inter-sectarian violence. On the other hand, exploiting the differences within one such group could thereby insist internal divide and intra-sectarian violence. This difference can therefore also influence how and why violence emerges and can shape the character of resulting conflict.

More generally, according to the Stockholm International Peace Research Institute:

Traditionally, sectarian violence implies a symmetrical confrontation between two or more non-state actors representing different population groups.

Sectarian violence differs from the concept of race riot. It may involve the dynamics of social polarization, the balkanization of a geographic area along the lines of self-identifying groups, and protracted social conflict.

The occurrence of sectarian violence is not solely based on inert characteristics of sectarianism but is further catalysed by enabling environmental factors of political, economic, social, and cultural nature. Political factors can include reforms which may favour or disadvantage certain groups compared to others, increasing sectarian divide and creating increased potential for sectarian violence such as in the example of Pakistan and its political reforms of the 1970s and 1980s. Socio-economic factors can encompass economic trends favouring sectarian divide such as the policies created by the French Colonial Government of Mandate Syria of the 1920s. Lastly, cultural factors such as the movement of unarmed european jesuit priests within Lebanon in the late 19th century created a cultural climate in which local sectarian elites were favoured and thereby could exacerbate sectarian divide and the potential for violence among them.

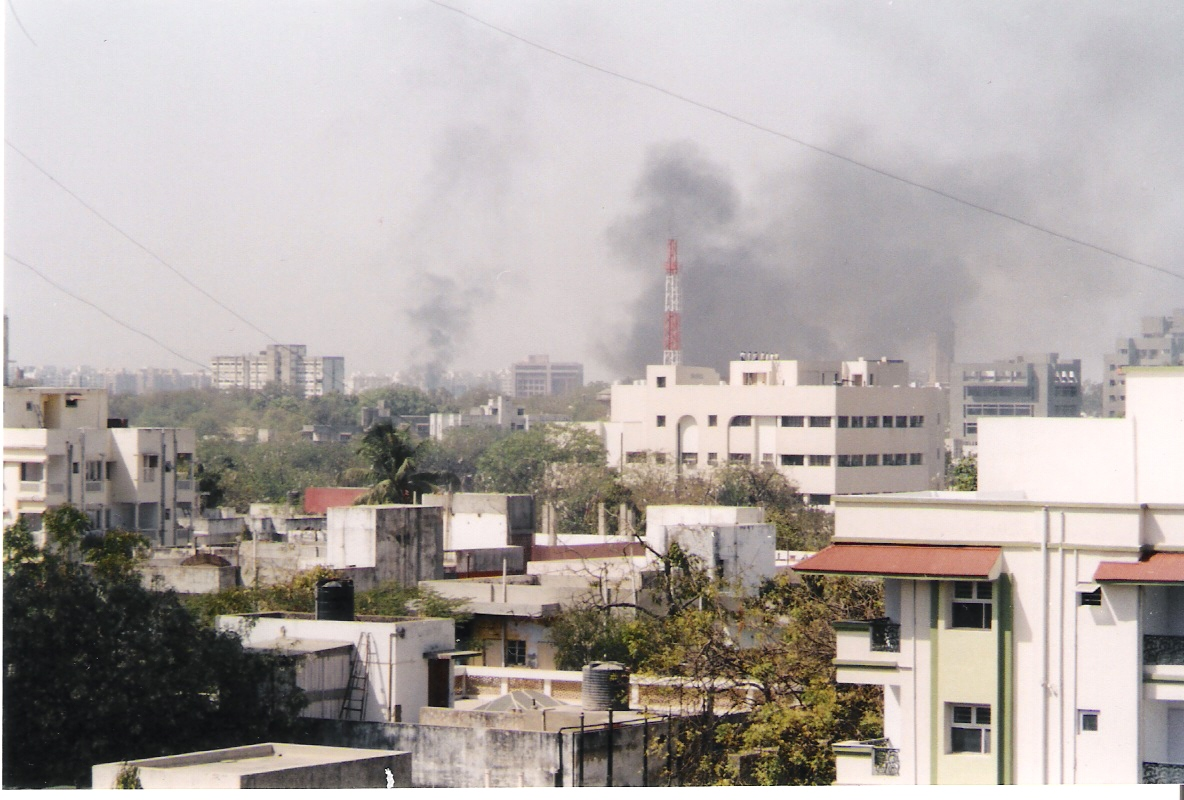
Buildings in Ahmedabad burning during the 2002 Gujarat violence, a period of sectarian violence between Hindus and Muslims.

For further examples see:

- Economic conflict: capitalist versus socialist
- Political conflict: internationalist versus nationalist
- Interreligious conflict:
  - Buddhist
  - Christian
  - Jewish
  - Muslim
- Christian conflict: Catholic versus Protestant
- Islamic conflict: Shia versus Sunni

== Historic examples ==
=== Among Buddhists ===
==== In Japan ====
In the Japanese Middle Ages, different Buddhist sects had warrior monks and private armies that frequently clashed. See Buddhism and violence.

=== Among Christians ===
==== Catholic-Eastern Orthodox ====
Although the First Crusade was initially launched in response to an appeal from Byzantine Emperor Alexios I Komnenos for help in repelling the invading Seljuq Turks from Anatolia, one of the lasting legacies of the Crusades was to "further separate the Eastern and Western branches of Christianity from each other."

==== European wars of religion ====
The Battle of the White Mountain in Bohemia (1620)—one of the decisive battles of the Thirty Years War

Following the onset of the Protestant Reformation, a series of wars were waged in Europe starting circa 1524 and continuing intermittently until 1648. Although sometimes unconnected, all of these wars were strongly influenced by the religious change of the period, and the conflict and rivalry that it produced. According to Miroslav Volf, the European wars of religion were a major factor behind the "emergence of secularizing modernity".

In the St. Bartholomew's Day massacre followers of the Roman Catholic Church killed up to 30,000 Huguenots (French Protestants) in mob violence. The massacres were carried out on the national day celebrating Bartholomew the Apostle. Pope Gregory XIII sent the leader of the massacres a Golden Rose, and said that the massacres "gave him more pleasure than fifty Battles of Lepanto, and he commissioned Giorgio Vasari to paint frescoes of it in the Vatican". The killings have been called "the worst of the century's religious massacres", and led to the start of the fourth war of the French Wars of Religion.

==== Northern Ireland ====
Since the 16th century there has been sectarian conflict of varying intensity between Roman Catholics and Protestants in Ireland. This religious sectarianism is connected to a degree with nationalism. Northern Ireland has seen inter-communal conflict for more than four centuries and there are records of religious ministers or clerics, the agents for absentee landlords, aspiring politicians, and members of the landed gentry stirring up and capitalizing on sectarian hatred and violence as far back as the late 18th century.

William E.H. Lecky, an Irish historian, wrote in 1892 that, "If the characteristic mark of a healthy Christianity be to unite its members by a bond of fraternity and love, then there is no country where Christianity has more completely failed than Ireland".

Steve Bruce, a sociologist, wrote;

The Northern Ireland conflict is a religious conflict. Economic and social considerations are also crucial, but it was the fact that the competing populations in Ireland adhered and still adhere to competing religious traditions which has given the conflict its enduring and intractable quality. Reviewers agreed "Of course the Northern Ireland conflict is at heart religious".

John Hickey wrote;

Politics in the North is not politics exploiting religion. That is far too simple an explanation: it is one which trips readily off the tongue of commentators who are used to a cultural style in which the politically pragmatic is the normal way of conducting affairs and all other considerations are put to its use. In the case of Northern Ireland the relationship is much more complex. It is more a question of religion inspiring politics than of politics making use of religion. It is a situation more akin to the first half of seventeenth century England than to the last quarter of twentieth‑century Britain.

The period from 1969 to 1998 is known as "The Troubles", a period of frequent violence and tense relations between Northern Ireland's communities. About one in eight females and one in five males in Northern Ireland identified themselves as belonging to no religion. However, people of no religion are still generally attributed a Catholic or Protestant identity based on their ancestry and upbringing, both by the community in general and the state. Government advice recommends that in situations where an individual chooses not to identify as a member of the Catholic or Protestant community, individuals responsible for Equal Opportunities monitoring should determine communal affiliation on the basis of information such as name, address, schools attended or hobbies. People of no religion are less likely to support the main, constitution-oriented main political parties, or more likely to support a more neutral political party such as the Alliance Party of Northern Ireland.

About two-thirds of people with no religion tend to think of themselves as neither unionist or nationalist, although a much higher percentage of those with no religion tend to think of themselves as unionist than nationalist.

For people who describe themselves as Protestant or Roman Catholic, a small majority of them appear to favour one of the two main political parties on either side: the Democratic Unionist Party or the Ulster Unionist Party for Protestants; and Sinn Féin or the Social Democratic and Labour Party for Roman Catholics. In each case, the percentage in the Northern Irish Life & Times Survey in 2015 was 57%. Roman Catholics are more likely to reject the label British (59%) than Protestants are to reject the label Irish (48%).

67% of Protestants are more likely to consider the British identity as the 'best' single way to describe themselves, whereas 63% of Roman Catholics consider the best single way to describe themselves as Irish. There is an equal level of support for the more neutral Northern Irish identity, with 25% of people from each religion likely to choose that label as the best description. Over a third of people with no religion prefer to be described as Northern Irish.

There are organizations dedicated to the reduction of sectarianism in Northern Ireland. The Corrymeela Community (in Ballycastle, County Antrim), operates a retreat centre on the northern coast of Northern Ireland to bring Catholics and Protestants together to discuss their differences and similarities. The Ulster Project works with teenagers from Northern Ireland and the United States to provide safe, non-denominational environments to discuss sectarianism in Northern Ireland. These organizations are attempting to bridge the gap of historical prejudice between the two religious communities.

Although state schools in Northern Ireland are non-denominational, most Catholic parents still send their children to specifically Catholic schools or Irish-language medium schools, thus ensuring that state school students are almost wholly Protestant. There are some integrated schools and the Society of Friends (Quakers) have long been an advocate of co-education in terms of religion, operating the Friends' School in Lisburn (first established in 1774).

==== Yugoslav wars ====
Howard Goeringer criticizes both the "Catholic Pope and the Orthodox Patriarch" for failing to condemn the "deliberate massacre of men, women and children in the name of 'ethnic cleansing' as incompatible with Jesus' life and teaching."

==== Rwandan genocide ====
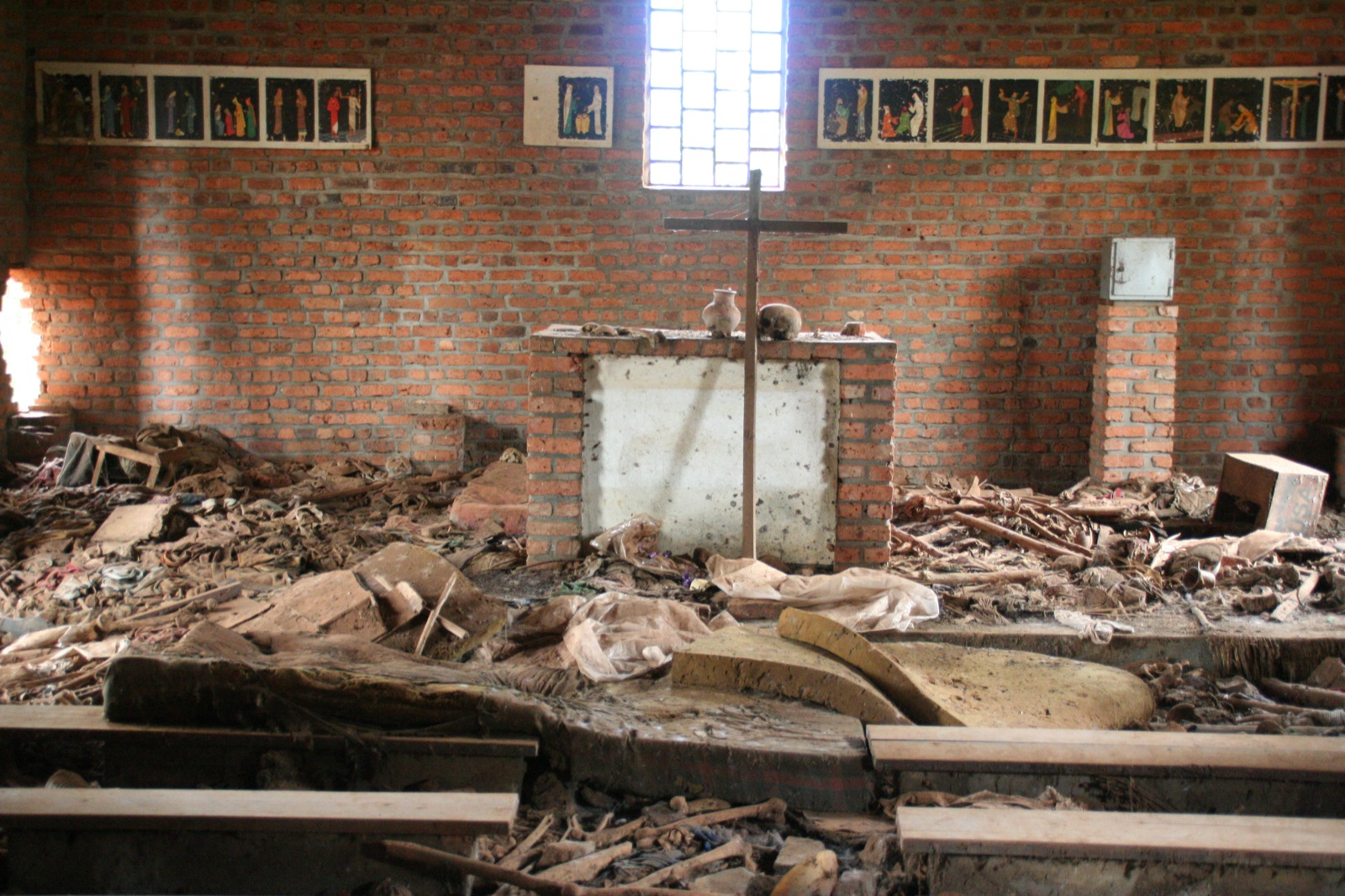
Over 5,000 people seeking refuge in Ntarama church were killed by grenade, machete, rifle, or burnt alive.

The majority of Rwandans and in particular, the majority of Tutsis, are Catholic, so a shared religion did not prevent genocide. Miroslav Volf cites a Roman Catholic bishop from Rwanda as saying, "The best cathechists, those who filled our churches on Sundays, were the first to go with machetes in their hands". Ian Linden asserts that "there is absolutely no doubt that significant numbers of prominent Christians were involved in sometimes slaughtering their own church leaders." According to Volf, "what is particularly disturbing about the complicity of the church is that Rwanda is without doubt one of Africa’s most evangelized nations. Eight out of ten of its people claimed to be Christians."

When the Catholic missionaries came to Rwanda in the late 1880s, they contributed to the "Hamitic" theory of race origins, which taught that the Tutsi were a superior race. The Church has been considered to have played a significant role in fomenting racial divisions between Hutu and Tutsi, in part because they found more willing converts among the majority Hutu. The Organisation of African Unity (OAU) report on the genocide states,

In the colonial era, under German and then Belgian rule, Roman Catholic missionaries, inspired by the overtly racist theories of 19th century Europe, concocted a destructive ideology of ethnic cleavage and racial ranking that attributed superior qualities to the country's Tutsi minority, since the missionaries ran the colonial-era schools, these pernicious values were systematically transmitted to several generations of Rwandans...

The Catholic Church argues that those who took part in the genocide did so without the sanction of the Church. Although the genocide was ethnically motivated and religious factors were not prominent, Human Rights Watch reported that a number of religious authorities in Rwanda, particularly Catholic, failed to condemn the genocide publicly at the time.

Some Christian leaders have been convicted by the International Criminal Tribunal for Rwanda for their roles in the genocide. These include Rwandan Roman Catholic priests and nuns as well as a Seventh-day Adventist Church pastor.

==== Scotland ====
Scotland suffers from a spill-over of sectarianism, largely owing to the Troubles in neighbouring Northern Ireland because many people, particularly in the West of Scotland, have links to Northern Ireland by genealogy or immigration.

Scotland's two largest and best supported football clubs—Glasgow Rangers, which, for many generations, has largely been identified with Protestants and unionism, and Glasgow Celtic, which, since its founding in the late 19th century, has been identified with Roman Catholics and Irish nationalism or republicanism—both subscribe, with varying degrees of success, to government initiatives and charities like the Nil by Mouth campaign are working in this area.

Celtic previously sent letters to every season ticket holder reminding supporters that no form of sectarianism is welcome at Celtic Park. Rangers' anti-sectarian policy is called Follow With Pride.

=== Among Muslims ===
Sectarian violence between the two major sects of Islam, Shia and Sunni, has occurred arising out of differences over the succession to Muhammad. Abu Bakr, a companion of Muhammad, was nominated by Umar and elected as the first Sunni Rightly Guided Caliph. However, another group felt that Ali, the cousin and the son-in-law of Muhammad, had been designated as the first Imam by Muhammad and in accordance with this belief, Shia consider him the first Imam.

According to Sunnis, Abu Bakr was followed by Umar as caliph of the Rashidun Caliphate, then by Uthman ibn Affan and finally by Ali. Ali's right to rule was challenged by Muawiyah bin Abu Sufian, governor of Syria.

==== In Iraq ====
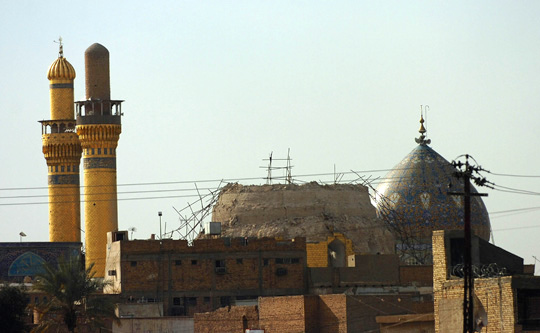
The Al-Askari Mosque, one of the holiest sites in Shia Islam, after the first attack by Sunni affiliated Al-Qaeda in Iraq in 2006

In February 2006, a full-scale civil war erupted in Iraq, when violence between the two Muslim rival sects erupted. It has left tens of thousands to hundreds of thousands of people dead and dozens of mosques and homes destroyed.

==== In Pakistan ====
In Pakistan, the first organized outbreak of sectarian violence was triggered when two rival organizations were established in early 1980: Tehrik-e-Jafaria (TFJ) (Organization of the Jafri (Shia) Law) represented Shia communities, and Sipah-e-Sahaba Pakistan (SSP) (Guardian of the Companions of the Prophet) representing Sunnis. The first major incident which occurred during this outbreak of sectarian violence was the killing of Arif Hussain Hussaini, the founder and the leader of the TFJ in 1986.

In retaliation, Haq Nawaz Jhangvi, founder of the (SSP) was murdered. Since then, an internecine bloody vendetta has ensued. The epicenters of the violence have been Kurram, Hangu, Dera Ismail Khan, Bahawalpur, Jhang, Quetta, Gigit- Baltistan and Karachi.

The transformation of the sectarian conflict into a violent civil war in Pakistan coincided with the establishment of the Islamic republic of Iran and the promotion of the Sunni religion and its incorporation into the Pakistani state's institutions by General Muhammad Zia-ul-Haq's regime.

The Iranian Revolution was led by Shia clerics, and it influenced Shia communities all over the world. In Pakistan, Tehrik-e-Jafaria was established for the purpose of demanding the enforcement of adherence to the Sharia Law. This demand was considered detrimental by the Sunni religious leaders. In response, the SSP was established by extremist Sunni clerics. Many of these clerics had advocated sectarian violence against the Ahmadis (a heterodox sect which is considered non-Muslim by the majority of Muslims).

==== In Somalia ====
Ahlu Sunna Waljama'a is a Somali paramilitary group which is led by Sufis and moderates who oppose the radical Islamist group Al-Shabaab. It is fighting in order to prevent Wahhabism from being imposed on Somalis whose religious views are generally moderate and preserve their Sunni-Sufi tradition.

==== In Syria ====
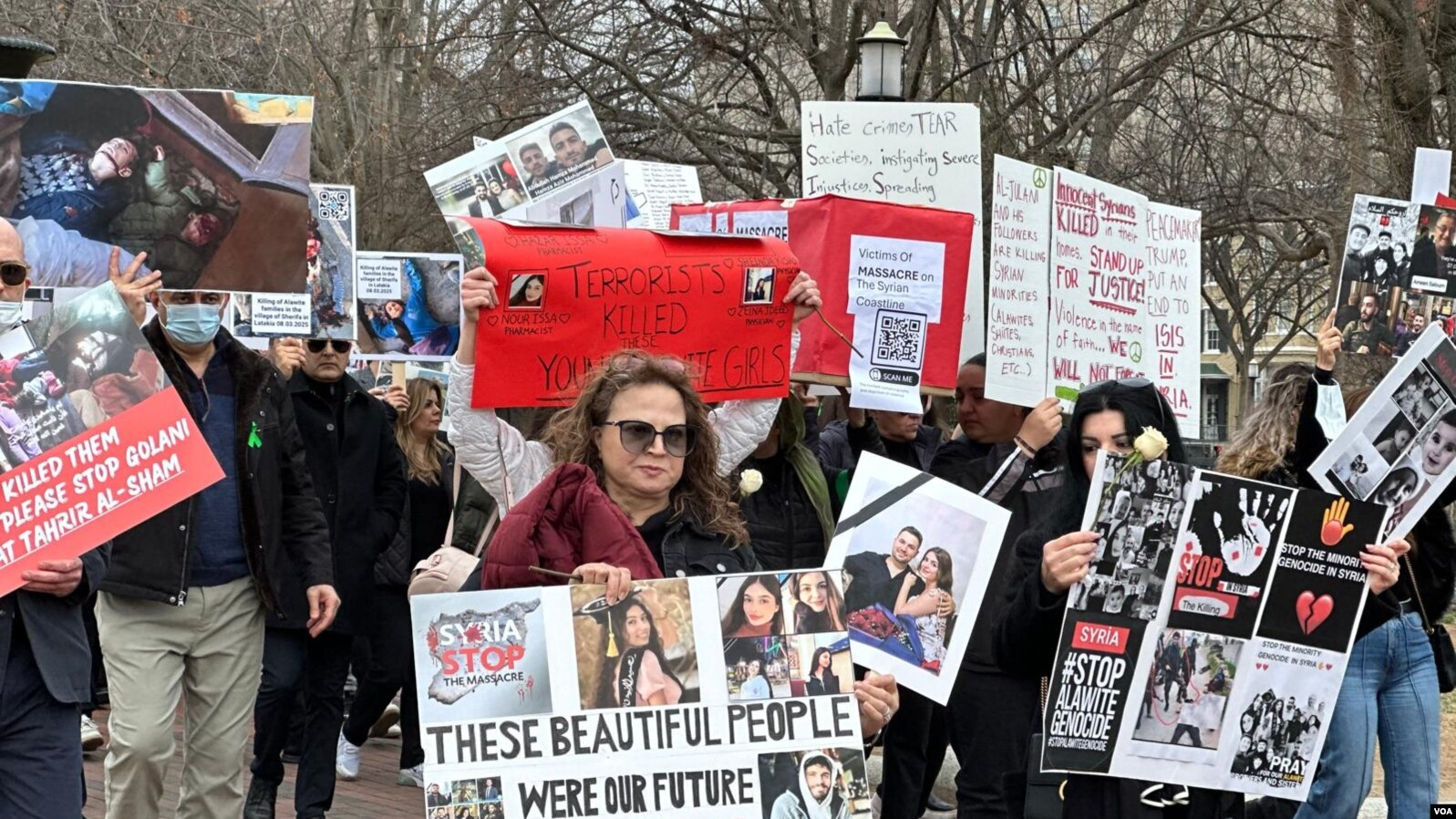
Protest in Washington D.C. against the 2025 massacres of Syrian Alawites

The Syrian civil war gradually shifted towards a more sectarian nature. Pro-Assad militant groups were largely Shia, while anti-Assad militant groups were majority Sunni.

==== In Yemen ====
In Yemen, there have been many clashes between Sunnis and Shia Houthis. According to The Washington Post, "In today’s Middle East, activated sectarianism affects the political cost of alliances, making them easier between co-religionists. That helps explain why Sunni-majority states are lining up against Iran, Iraq and Hezbollah over Yemen."

=== Among Sikhs ===
In 1978, Khalsa Sikhs consisting of Damdami Taksal, Akhand Kirtani Jatha and Akali-Nihangs led by Fauja Singh and Jarnail Singh Bhindranwale clashed with members of the Sant Nirankari Mission, a heretical Sikh sect in Amritsar, Punjab after the Sant Nirankari Guru, Gurbachan Singh committed blasphemy by calling himself the reincarnation of Guru Nanak, made blasphemous statements on Guru Gobind Singh, Guru Granth Sahib, and created sacrilegious versions of Sikh rituals. The clashes ended with 3 Sant Nirankaris and 13 Khalsa Sikhs dead.

Piara Singh Bhaniara started his own heretical Sikh sect and dera with about 600,000 followers in the 1980s resulting in him being ex-communicated by the Akal Takht. In the summer of 2000, a local gurudwara disallowed one of Bhaniara's followers from carrying the Sikh religious holy book Guru Granth Sahib. This prompted Bhaniara's followers to write their own holy book (granth), resulting in the creation of the Bhavsagar Samudra Amrit Vani Granth. Orthodox Sikhs alleged that Bhavsagar Granth copied several portions from the Guru Granth Sahib, and that Bhaniara insultingly imitated the Sikh Guru Gobind Singh in several photos in the book. In September 2001, during a religious ceremony organized by Bhaniara's followers, a newly-formed organization called Khalsa Action Force attacked the function, seized the Bhavsagar Granth and burned it. This was followed by several instances of Guru Granth Sahib being burnt in the rural gurudwaras of Punjab. The Punjab Police arrested and presented before media some young men, who stated that they had burned Guru Granth Sahib at the insistence of Bhaniara. The arrests sparked off violence against Bhaniara's followers. In October 2001, Bhaniara was arrested under the National Security Act, and charged with several crimes. His followers were put in jail, where they were attacked with acid and knives by Sikhs. Some of Bhaniara's deras were converted into SGPC-administered gurudwaras. No action was taken against the Sikhs who attacked Bhaniara's followers. In 2001, the Parkash Singh Badal-led Government of Punjab banned Bhavsagar Granth and confiscated all its copies, arresting those who were found in possession of these copies. The print copy was probably destroyed by the Punjab Police. In 2003, a Sikh man named Gopal Singh attempted to stab Bhaniara, when he was in Ambala to appear in the court in connection with his alleged involvement with the burning of the copies of Guru Granth Sahib. A member of Babbar Khalsa, Gurdeep Singh Rana was arrested for trying to assassinate Bhaniara using a bomb in January 2005.

== Strategies for ending sectarian violence ==
Among many theories, two strategies have been prominently debated within contemporary peace and conflict studies regarding the ending of violence and the creation of peace:

Inter-Group Contact

The theory of inter-group contact posits that through increased social interaction amongst (formerly) conflicting groups, their enmity may be decreased. An example that has been cited within contemporary research of religious sectarian violence is the case of Northern Ireland and the engagement in programs to foster new connections between catholic and protestant youth.

Democratic Peace Theory

Democratic peace theory assumes that through the democratization of conflict societies the tendency for conflict by violent means may be decreased. An example for this strategy is the case of Bosnia and Herzegovina and the establishment of democratically modelled institutions after its internal conflict after 1995.

== See also ==
- Social cohesion

=== Examples ===
- Caste-related violence in India
- La Violencia in Colombia
- Communalism (South Asia)
- Cypriot intercommunal violence
- Religious violence in India
- Caste-related violence in India
- 2009 Boko Haram Uprising
- 2009 Gojra riots
- Rohingya conflict
