= Desmond O'Grady =

Desmond O'Grady may refer to:

- Desmond O'Grady (journalist) (1929–2021), Australian journalist and author
- Desmond O'Grady (poet) (1935–2014), Irish poet
- Des O'Grady (born 1952), Irish former Gaelic footballer
