= Soft Target (book) =

1989 book by Brian McAndrew

- Author: Zuhair Kashmeri & Brian McAndrew
- Language: English
- Genre: Investigative Journalism
- Publisher: James Lorimer & Company
- Publication date: 1989 and reprint in 2005
- Publication place: Canada
- Media type: Print Paperback & Cloth
- Pages: 162
- ISBN: 1-55028-221-2 (Paperback 1989) & 1-55028-904-7 (2005)

Soft Target: How the Indian Intelligence Service Penetrated Canada is an investigative journalism book written by Canadian reporters Zuhair Kashmeri (from The Globe and Mail) and Brian McAndrew (from The Toronto Star). The authors define a "soft target" as "an espionage term used for any country, institution or group of people very easy to penetrate and manipulate for subversive purposes" and argue that the Canadian Sikh community was a soft target of a covert operation by the Indian government during the 1980s. The book also makes a claim that Indian intelligence agencies not only penetrated the Sikh community in order to discredit them worldwide and halt the momentum of the demand of an independent Sikh state, but also manipulated the Royal Canadian Mounted Police (RCMP) and Canadian Security Intelligence Service (CSIS).

The 1989 edition is partitioned into 10 chapters.

== India conspiracy ==
Inderjit Singh Reyat, the only person convicted of in the Air India Flight 182 bombing, is seen in the book being fed a story by Indian government agents. While Reyat's official testimony was contradictory, at one point Reyat claimed that a man staying at his home bought the tuner and took it when he left. Reyat said he did not know the man's name.

The book claims that within hours after the flight was blown up, The Globe and Mail received a call from Toronto Indian Consul General Surinder Malik with a detailed description of the bombing and the names of those he said were involved. Malik claimed his source was the Indian intelligence network, which had traced the methods of planting the bombs and the identity of the culprits.

== Use by Security Intelligence Review Committee ==
Canada's Security Intelligence Review Committee (SIRC) investigated Soft Target's description of events surrounding Flight 182 and concluded "the CSIS information it examined was insufficient to establish a conspiracy against Air India sponsored by foreign governments, in particular the Government of India."

== Banning in India ==
The Telegraph reported that Soft Target was banned in India for "obvious reasons".
