= T. A. Pai Management Institute =

Private educational institution

- Type: Private business school
- Established: 1980; 46 years ago
- Founder: T. A. Pai
- Director: Debasis Pradhan
- Location: Manipal, Karnataka, India; 13°20′56.12″N 74°47′11.73″E
- Campus: University town, 42 acres (170,000 m^{2})
- Website: www.tapmi.edu.in

T. A. Pai Management Institute, abbreviated as TAPMI, is a private business school under Manipal Academy of Higher Education in India. It was established in 1980 and is located in the university town of Manipal in Karnataka. It is the fifth management institute in India with dual accreditation of Association to Advance Collegiate Schools of Business (AACSB) and Association of MBAs (AMBA). It also has a campus in Bengaluru.

== History ==
Established in 1980 in Manipal by T. A. Pai, TAPMI's first fully residential two-year PGDM Program commenced in the year 1984-85 with a batch size of 48.

Apart from the flagship two-year fully residential core MBA programme, it also has 2 year fully residential BKFS (Banking and Financial Services), HRM (Human Resource Management), IB (International Business), Marketing, Technology Management and Artificial Intelligence and Data Science Management courses.

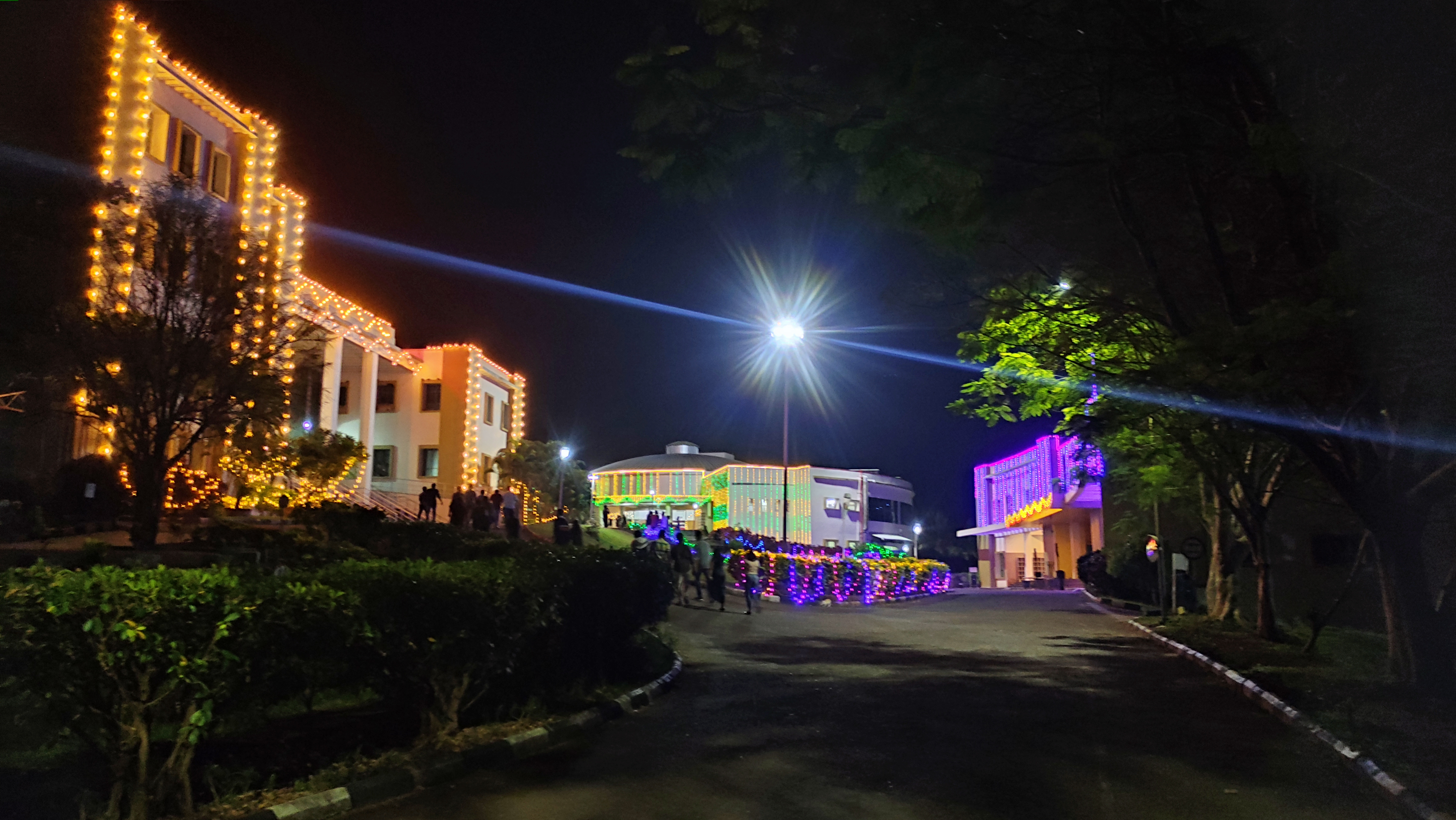
T.A.Pai Management Institute

TAPMI was accredited by the Association to Advance Collegiate Schools of Business on 29 April 2012 and the Association of MBAs on 4 December 2018.

TAPMI merged with Manipal Academy of Higher Education in 2021, allowing it to start awarding MBA degrees.

== Programmes ==
TAPMI's programmes include a two-year residential Master of Business Administration programme including specialization in human resource management, banking and financial services, international business, marketing, technology management, artificial intelligence and data science, a Ph. D. programme, and an 18-month joint TAPMI and University of Dubai MBA programme. TAPMI collaborates with a number of business organisations to provide continuous learning and education to their executives.

TAPMI conducts student and faculty exchanges with Sheffield Hallam University, UK, Macquarie University, Australia and with the Asian Institute of Management, Manila.

== Rankings ==
Institute rankings

Business/Management – India
- Outlook India (2024): 4

TAPMI was ranked 39 among business schools in India by the National Institutional Ranking Framework in 2025. It was also ranked 4 among private MBA institutions in India by Outlook India's "Top 150 Private MBA Institutions" of 2024. TAPMI also was ranked at number 21 in the Business Today (India) Best B-Schools Rankings 2024.

== Events ==
Events conducted by student committees include TAPMI Quiz on the Beach™, India's biggest on campus quizzing event, Atharva, the annual international B-School festival, Disha - the annual HR conclave, 'Genesis' which is a cultural event celebrated with grandeur styles and Brandscan, which is organised in 3 formats Urban(In Bangalore), Semi Urban(Manipal), Rural(Kundapura) to understand consumer behavior. The JoyFest (Joy of Giving), organized by the Social Endeavor Group of TAPMI to help the underprivileged, goes on for a week.

They also have fully student managed investment forums SAMNIDHY and SMIC that gives students opportunity to gain real time experience in stock markets Another student-led committee at TAPMI is the Sports Committee, popularly known as SportsCom. It organizes various sporting events, including Strike, an indoor sports tournament, Futsal, TPL (cricket), and SPEED, its flagship multi-sport championship. For the 2026–27 academic year, the committee is headed by T. Arun, Ram Pareek, and HiteshAdhithya SL.

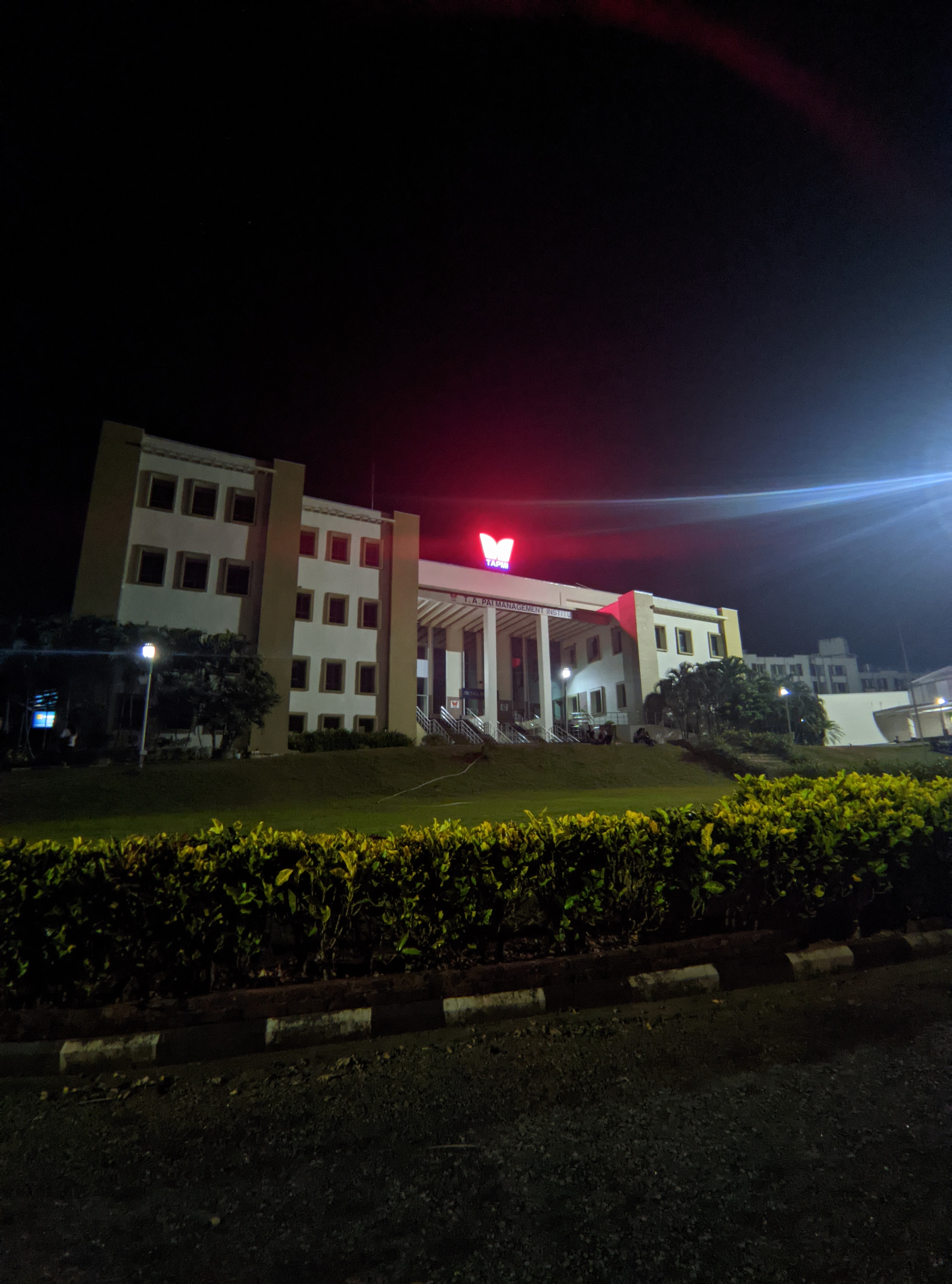
T. M. A. Pai Block

=== Defi ===
Defi, the OMEGA’s (Organization for Managerial Entrepreneurial Guidance and Assistance) flagship event which is a platform for the students put on their entrepreneurial hats and have a firsthand experience in running businesses for a couple of days. OMEGA is a Students Consulting Wing. OMEGA supports and partners with small and medium scale enterprises, traders who are in and around Manipal, Udupi and Mangalore in their business. The committee has expanded its consulting operation to provide service to Indian corporates. Entrepreneurs approach OMEGA with their problems or projects and OMEGAns (Student Members) solve their problem or help them in growing their business. The students also seek guidance from the faculty members for solving the issues. OMEGA provides a platform for interaction between students and local entrepreneurs. The project undertaken by OMEGA ranges from various operational issues to strategic decisions.

BrandScan

BrandScan is the flagship market research initiative of the T. A. Pai Management Institute (TAPMI), Manipal. Established in 1993, it began as a market research fair and has evolved into a student-driven, experiential market research programme involving live projects for organisations across industries. BrandScan enables students to undertake the complete market research process, including problem identification, research design, primary and secondary data collection, analysis, and presentation of strategic recommendations. The initiative incorporates conventional as well as innovative methodologies, including disguised and projective research techniques, to understand consumer behaviour and preferences. Over its three-decade history, BrandScan has undertaken more than 350 research projects for organisations across India, with clients and research engagements involving companies such as ITC, Apple, Nestlé, Sony, Amul, Perfetti Van Melle, PepsiCo, Berger Paints, and Reliance Jio. The current Chairperson of BrandScan is Prof. Jayanthi Thanigan, who brings extensive industry experience from GCMMF-Amul and academic experience across leading B-schools.

Success Stories

Reliance Jio: BrandScan's research provided insights that contributed to the development of market-entry offerings, pricing plans, and the customer acquisition model during Jio's entry into the telecom sector.

Little Hearts: Consumer feedback and visual testing generated packaging and colour-scheme insights, supporting improvements in shelf visibility and consumer recall.

Polo: BrandScan's research identified demand for low-unit packs in impulse categories, contributing to the introduction of the ₹2/- Polo SKU to support market penetration and consumer trial.

3M Car Care: Research identified convenience as a key consumer priority, leading to a recommendation for doorstep car-care services and supporting 3M's exploration of a new service segment. Over the years, BrandScan has delivered consumer and market insights across diverse industries, contributing to product, packaging, pricing, distribution, and service-related decisions for its client

== Publications ==
- Pratibimb, The TAPMI's e-Magazine, is the conglomeration of the various specializations in MBA (Marketing, Finance, HR, Systems and Operations).
- UPDATE - annual magazine released at the Convocation with a comprehensive report on all the activities and achievements of the institute, its faculty, staff, students and alumni.
- TAPMI Research Newsletter at half yearly intervals in March and September.
- A newsletter covers various activities and events that have taken place in the TAPMI community. It covers the faculty publications and awards, students and alumni.
- Alt+T, is a monthly issue by TAPMI’s Literary and Media committee. It includes articles by the professors and the students on any topic of their choice.
