= Great Soul: Mahatma Gandhi and His Struggle with India =

2011 biography by Joseph Lelyveld

Great Soul: Mahatma Gandhi and His Struggle With India
- Front cover of the first American edition
- Author: Joseph Lelyveld
- Language: English
- Subject: Mahatma Gandhi
- Genre: Biography
- Publisher: Alfred A. Knopf (US); Harper Collins India (India)
- Publication place: USA
- English publication date: 29 March 2011
- Pages: 432
- ISBN: 0-307-26958-2

Great Soul: Mahatma Gandhi and His Struggle With India is a 2011 biography of Indian political and spiritual leader Mahatma Gandhi written by Pulitzer Prize-winning author Joseph Lelyveld and published by Alfred A Knopf.

The book is split between the time Gandhi spent in South Africa and his return to India as the Mahatma.

== Critical and popular reception ==
=== Response in India ===
The Legislative Assembly of Gujarat, the lawmaking body of Gandhi's home state, voted unanimously on March 20, 2011, to ban Great Soul because of Lelyveld’s use of documentary evidence and informed opinion to point to the relationship that Gandhi had developed with a Prussian architect whom the Indian playfully boasted as "having received physical training at the hands of [Eugen] Sandow [the father of modern bodybuilding]". Lelyveld’s inquiry includes quotes from a letter sent by Gandhi to Kallenbach from London in 1909: "Your portrait (the only one) stands on my mantelpiece in the bedroom. The mantelpiece is opposite to the bed… [The purpose of which] is to show to you and me how completely you have taken possession of my body. This is slavery with a vengeance."

Lelyveld has stated that the gay interpretation of his work is a mistake. Lelyveld added: "The book does not say that Gandhi was bisexual or homosexual. It says that he was celibate and deeply attached to Kallenbach. This is not news."

=== Review by the New York Times ===
Writing for The New York Times, Hari Kunzru finds Great Soul to be "judicious and thoughtful". Lelyveld's book, he writes, will be revelatory to American readers who may only be familiar with the rudiments of Gandhi's life and for those readers, perhaps especially Indian readers, who are better acquainted with the Gandhi story the book's portrait of the man will still be challenging.

Reports of passages within the book regarding the nature of Gandhi and Kallenbach's relationship prompted the Wall Street Journal to ponder "Was Gandhi gay?" Kunzru for the Times observes that modern readers who are less familiar with the concept of Platonic love may interpret the relationship, in particular their romantic-sounding letters, as indicating a sexually charged relationship. However, he adds that Gandhi in 1906 took a vow of celibacy, which both Gandhi and the people of India saw as a cornerstone of his moral authority.

=== Review by the Wall Street Journal ===
Writing for The Wall Street Journal, British historian Andrew Roberts noted that, while the book gives "more than enough information" about Gandhi's sexual life, it is "nonetheless well-researched and well-written."

=== Other reviews ===
Indrajit Hazra writing for the Hindustan Times described the book to have weaved "the unreceived narratives with the received one, and in the process presents to the reader a more complete picture of a complex, undoubtedly great man".

Christopher Hitchens writing for The Atlantic wrote that the "book provides the evidence for both readings, depending on whether you think Gandhi was a friend of the poor or a friend of poverty".

== See also ==
- 2011 in literature
- List of books banned in India
