= Move Your Shadow =

1985 book by Joseph Lelyveld

- Author: Joseph Lelyveld
- Publication date: 1985
- Awards: 1986 Pulitzer Prize for General Nonfiction

Move Your Shadow: South Africa, Black and White, written by Joseph Lelyveld and published by Times Books in 1985, won the 1986 Pulitzer Prize for General Nonfiction as well as the 1986 Los Angeles Times Book Prize for Current Interest.
