= Piara Singh Bhaniara =

Indian religious leader (1958–2019)

Photograph of Piara Singh Bhaniara

Piara Singh Bhaniara (23 August 1958 – 30 December 2019) also known as Baba Bhaniara (or Bhaniarawala), was a Dalit religious leader from Punjab, India. He established a Sikh sect in the 1980s, which was opposed by mainline Khalsa Sikhs as insulting to their faith. In 2001, his followers published their own holy text Bhavsagar Granth, and allegedly insulted the Sikh holy book Guru Granth Sahib. This sparked violence against Bhaniara's followers. The Government of Punjab banned Bhavsagar Granth, and arrested and jailed Bhaniara.

== Early life ==
Piara Singh Bhaniara was from the Dhamiana village of Rupnagar district. He was one of the 7 children of Tulsi Ram, a mason. Before becoming a religious leader, Bhaniara was working in a sericulture farm in Asmanpur village, as a Class IV employee of the Punjab state's horticulture department.

== Religious career ==
Bhaniara's father served as the caretaker of two mazars (mausoleums of Sufi saints) located on the outskirts of Dhamiana. After his father's death, Bhaniara became the caretaker of these mazars. He started handing out medicines for various ailments, gaining recognition as a "baba" (holy father) with healing powers. He started to attract a lot of followers, most of whom were Mazhabi Sikhs. The visitors to his dera included the Indian National Congress politician Buta Singh, who was India's Home Minister at that time. Buta Singh visited Bhaniara several times between 1985 and 1995 for healing of his wife Manjit Kaur, who was suffering from several problems of the heart, kidney, skin and lungs.

As Bhaniara's followers grew in numbers (600,000 according to police estimates), a number of politicians started visiting him for his help during elections. These politicians helped him build his 100+ acre dera at Dhamiana.

=== Conflict with the Sikhs ===
In 1998, the jathedar of the supreme Sikh religious body Akal Takht excommunicated Bhaniara, alleging that he was prone to say "nasty" things about Sikhism and its contemporary leaders.

In the summer of 2000, a local gurudwara disallowed one of Bhaniara's followers from carrying the Sikh religious holy book Guru Granth Sahib. This prompted Bhaniara's followers to write their own holy book (granth), resulting in the creation of the Bhavsagar Samunder Amrit Vani Granth. Some Sikhs alleged that Bhavsagar Granth copied several portions from the Guru Granth Sahib, and that Bhaniara insultingly imitated the Sikh Guru Gobind Singh in several photos in the book.

In 2001, Akal Takht summoned Bhaniara, intending to chastise him for his large following. However, Bhaniara rejected the summons, arguing that he had no reason to obey the Akal Takht, because they had excommunicated him three years earlier.

In September 2001, during a religious ceremony organised by Bhaniara's followers, a newly-formed organisation called Khalsa Action Force attacked the function, seized the Bhavsagar Granth and burned it. This was followed by several instances of Guru Granth Sahib being burnt in the rural gurudwaras of Punjab. The Punjab Police arrested and presented before media some young men, who stated that they had burned Guru Granth Sahib at the insistence of Bhaniara.

The arrests sparked off violence against Bhaniara's followers. In October 2001, Bhaniara was arrested under the National Security Act, and charged with several crimes. His followers were put in jail, where they were attacked with acid and knives by people claiming to be Sikhs. Some of Bhaniara's deras were converted into SGPC-administered gurudwaras. No action was taken against those who attacked Bhaniara's followers. Politicians who were associated with Bhaniara were punished by Akal Takht; many of them disavowed Bhaniara and asked for greater punishment to Bhaniara and his followers.

The Parkash Singh Badal-led Punjab government banned Bhavsagar Granth and confiscated all its copies, arresting those who were found in possession of these copies. The print copy was probably destroyed by the police. A 3-member SGPC committee published a 48-page report listing various acts of sacrilege committed by Bhaniara's followers. It also indicted several politicians for patronising Bhaniara: these included Buta Singh, Joginder Singh Mann, Amrik Singh Aliwal, Gurdev Singh Badal and Kewal Badal. It also blamed several Nihang leaders for propagating Bhaniara's cult.

In 2003, a man named Gopal Singh attempted to stab Bhaniara, when he was in Ambala to appear in the court in connection with his alleged involvement with the alleged burning of the copies of Guru Granth Sahib.

=== After release ===
Bhaniara was released in 2003, but the District Magistrate of Rupnagar banned his entry into the Rupnagar district, thus preventing him from visiting his dera at Dhamiana. Bhaniara and his followers successfully challenged this ban in the court. The local administration ordered him not to organise large gatherings, but despite this, a large number of his followers continued visiting him on his birthday (23 August). There has been no further violence between Bhaniara's followers and the Sikhs, although in 2004, there were protests by Sikh organisations, when a gurudwara allowed Bhaniara's followers to carry a copy of Guru Granth Sahib. A member of Babbar Khalsa, Gurdeep Singh Rana was arrested for trying to assassinate Bhaniara using a bomb in January 2005.

=== Death ===
Bhaniara died on 30 December 2019, after developing chest pain and complaining suffocation, following which he was being taken to a hospital in Mohali, but he died on the way in Kharar.
