= Bhavsagar Granth =

Religious text

Bhavsagar Granth Bhavsagar Samunder Amrit Vani Granth
- Photographs of Piara Singh Bhaniara composing the Bhavsagar Granth

Information
- Religion: Bhaniara sect of Sikhism
- Author: Piara Singh Bhaniara and followers

Bhavsagar Granth (full name: Bhavsagar Samunder Amrit Vani Granth) is a 2,704-page book considered as a religious text by the followers of the Indian religious leader Baba Piara Singh Bhaniara. Composed in 2000, it was banned by the Government of Punjab for hurting the religious feelings of Sikhs.

== Composition ==
Baba Bhaniara is the founder of a religious sect that attracted mostly the marginalised Mazhabi Sikhs. In 1998, the Sikh religious body Akal Takht excommunicated Bhaniara, accusing him of insulting Sikhism and the contemporary Sikh religious leaders. In summer 2000, a local gurudwara disallowed one of Bhaniara's followers from carrying the Sikh religious holy book Guru Granth Sahib. In response, Bhaniara's followers decided to create a new holy book (granth), which would not be controlled by the dominant section of the society. Over the next few months, Bhaniara and his followers created the Bhavsagar Granth (officially called Bhavsagar Samundar Amrit Vani).

The writing of the book began on 20 June 2000. Most of it was authored by Pritam Singh of Dhudike village, with help from 20 other followers (including six women).

== Release and distribution ==
Bhaniara released the book at a function held on the Baisakhi day in 2001. This 2,704-page copy was big and heavy: it was written on large sheets of paper with an expensive binding, and had several photographs of politicians who visited Bhaniara.

The text was photocopied and distributed among Bhaniara's followers, who started holding religious ceremonies with the book at the centre. Meanwhile, a printer in Chandigarh was assigned to create printed copies of the book.

== Opposition from Sikhs ==
Some Sikhs alleged that the book was insulting to their faith. According to them, the book copied several portions from the Sikh holy book Guru Granth Sahib. Moreover, the book had several photos in which Bhaniara allegedly imitated Guru Gobind Singh of the Sikhs. In one photo, he wore a shining coat and headgear similar to the ones seen in the popular posters of Gobind Singh; in another photo he rode a horse in manner of Gobind Singh. He also insisted that his sons be called sahibzadas, which is the title of Gobind Singh's sons. The book also contained stories of Baniara's greatness, narrating how his followers experienced good luck, while those who criticised or taunted him suffered from bad luck.

In September 2001, during a religious ceremony organised by Bhaniara's followers, a newly-formed organisation called Khalsa Action Force attacked the function, seized the book and burned it. This was followed by several instances of Guru Granth Sahib being burnt in the rural gurudwaras of Punjab. The police arrested and presented before media some young men, who stated that they had burned Guru Granth Sahib at the instance of Bhaniara. The arrests sparked off violence against Bhaniara's followers, and Bhaniara was himself arrested under the National Security Act. No action was taken against those who attacked Bhaniara's followers.

== Ban ==
In 2001, the Parkash Singh Badal-led Punjab government banned Bhavsagar Granth and confiscated all its copies, arresting those who were found in possession of these copies. The print copy was probably destroyed by the Punjab Police.

Praveen Swamy wrote in Frontline:

"Sadly, there has been little debate in Punjab on the legitimacy of the Punjab Government's decision to ban the Bhavsagar Granth. .. The Bhavsagar Granth ..at no point demeans the tenets or practice of the Sikh faith. ..The Bhavsagar Granth falls within a long tradition of insurgent folk religion. The Guru Granth Sahib itself, after all, took on Brahmanism in no certain terms.

The Supreme Court of India quashed the ban on Bhavsagar Granth on 11 November 2008, stating that the Punjab government was allowed to issue a fresh ban, if needed. The Punjab government then banned the book on 15 December 2008.

== See also ==
- Punjab plume controversy
- List of books banned in India
