= The Red Sari =

2008 novel by Javier Moro

- First edition (Spanish)
- Author: Javier Moro
- Original title: El sari rojo
- Translator: Peter J Hearn
- Language: Spanish
- Genre: Novel
- Publisher: Roli Books
- Publication date: 2015 January
- Publication place: Spain
- Pages: 429
- ISBN: 978-93-5194-103-3

The Red Sari (El sari rojo), which is a biography of the life of Sonia Gandhi, originally written in Spanish by Javier Moro and published in October 2008 in Spain. It ran into some controversy in India. Javier Moro's Spanish and Italian publishers received emails and threats from Indian National Congress lawyers and spokesperson Abhishek Singhvi with demands to withdraw the book from stores. Singhvi alleged that book distorted facts and misinterpreted details. The author always denied that the book is malicious and instead a slightly dramatized version.

The book tells the story of the Gandhi family through the eyes of Sonia Gandhi. Abhishek Singhvi claimed that the book violated a person's privacy for monetary gain. The book was finally released in India in January 2015 and was greeted with a big success.
