= Desmond O'Grady (journalist) =

Australian journalist (1929–2021)

Desmond M. O'Grady
- Born: 11 December 1929; Melbourne, Australia
- Died: 26 November 2021 (aged 91); Rome, Italy
- Occupations: Journalist, author, and playwright
- Known for: Books, articles, and plays

Desmond M. O'Grady (11 December 1929 – 26 November 2021) was an Australian journalist, author, and playwright who resided and worked in Rome from 1962.

== Early life ==
Desmond Michael O’Grady, (b. 11 December 1929) was born in Melbourne, Australia, the son of Edward O'Grady and Winifred (Kiernan) O'Grady. He had an elder brother, Lancelot Kevin O'Grady.

In 1936 he attended elementary school at the Good Shepherd Convent Melbourne. His father worked for the Australian Navy, and from 1940 he attended the Marist Brothers (Sydney) where his father was transferred to take charge of the naval stores at Garden Island Naval Base there.

He returned to complete elementary school at the Christian Brothers in St. Kilda, Melbourne where he finished his secondary education.

As a boy, O'Grady played cricket with the South Melbourne club in Melbourne and in his youth as an opening batsman for the Italian national team. He has won amateur tennis tournaments both in singles and doubles and as an Australian schoolboy was a champion middle distance runner.

== Education ==
In 1950 he began his studies with the Arts Faculty at the University of Melbourne, where he graduated in 1953. He taught English Literature and History at the secondary level in Victoria until he sailed for Europe in 1955. O'Grady took his diploma in Italian from the University for Foreigners in Perugia, Italy.

== Career and family ==
Upon earning his diploma in Italian, he worked in Rome for the US Catholic Immigration Office interviewing refugees from Eastern Europe.

O'Grady previously had short stories and articles published and a play of his staged in Melbourne when, in 1957, he started working as a journalist in Sydney.

In 1957 he married a Roman, Giuseppina Culotta, and with her returned to Melbourne where he worked for a time in the Australian Immigration Department. His first child, Kieran Gregory O'Grady, was born in Melbourne in 1958. His second child, Donatella O'Grady, was born in Rome in 1964 after he had again returned to that city.

While in Australia, he became foreign editor and then literary editor of the renowned weekly magazine The Bulletin but for family reasons returned to Rome in 1962.

Since that time, he lived in Rome as a journalist and author of books.

Although a Catholic he had not written about religion in Australia but upon returning to Rome he saw the Vatican Council, which began in 1962 which presented itself as an important journalistic opportunity. He wrote about the Council for publications worldwide becoming also the first Vatican correspondent for the USA's National Catholic Reporter when it was founded.

Time (19 November 1965) described his coverage of the Council as "consistently discerning in conveying (its) moods and trends".

He covered Vatican affairs for the National Catholic Reporter, The Washington Post, for Our Sunday Visitor and for the English Tablet. He had for his entire career also written about Italian affairs ranging from politics to culture and travel, mainly for The Sydney Morning Herald and The Age and other publications (see Bibliography, below).

He wrote 14 published books of fiction and non-fiction, including novels, collections of short stories, history and biography; many of these have been translated into various languages. O'Grady wrote from Italy for The Sydney Morning Herald, The Australian and The Age and other publications.

O'Grady died in Rome on 26 November 2021. He was survived by his son and daughter. His wife had predeceased him in 1996.

== Bibliography ==
=== Fiction ===
- A Long Way from Home. Cheshire, Melbourne 1966 (stories)
- Deschooling Kevin Carew, Wren, Melbourne 1974 (novel)
- Valid for All Countries, UQP, Brisbane 1979 (stories)
- Dinny Going Down. Arcadia Melbourne 2007 ( novel ) which concerns a Sydney journalist. Philip Knightley described it as "amusing, illuminating, touching and informative". Compared to Evelyn Waugh's Scoop.
- The Diviner Comedy - Novel (Arcadia Feb. 2021)

=== Non-fiction ===
- O'Grady, Desmond (1965). Eat from God's hand: Paul Gauthier and the Church of the poor. London: G. Chapman.
- Raffaello! Raffaello! Hale & Iremonger, Sydney 1983 (biography). Finalist Age Book of the Year Award.
- Caesar, Christ and Constantine, OSV Huntington 1991 (history) published also by HarperCollins, London, as The Victory of the Cross.
- Correggio Jones and the Runaways, CIS, Melbourne 1995 (essays)
- O'Grady, Desmond (December 1995). "Apocalypse postponed". Quadrant. 39 (12): 63–64.
- The Turned Card- Christianity Before and after the Wall, Loyola, Chicago, 1997. (current affairs) Published also in England and in four foreign language editions.
- Rome Reshaped, Continuum, New York 1999 (history) (Five foreign language editions)
- Beyond the Empire, Crossroad, New York 2001 (history)
- Stages of the Revolution: a biography of Raffaello Carboni of the Eureka Stockade. HardieGrant, Melbourne 2004. Italian edition 2008, winner of the Calabria Prize
- The Sibyl, the Shepherd and the Saint. Rome 2007 (travel)
- Tuscany Antipodean-Style Florence 2010
- A Word in Edgeways Melbourne 2010
- McDonald, Hamish & Desmond O'Grady (Autumn 2010). "Between two worlds". Reportage. Griffith Review. 27.
