= Joseph Lelyveld =

American journalist (1937–2024)

- Born: Joseph Salem Lelyveld; April 5, 1937; Cincinnati, Ohio, U.S.
- Died: January 5, 2024 (aged 86); New York City, U.S.
- Education: Harvard University (BA, MA); Columbia University (MS)
- Occupations: Journalist, author
- Known for: Executive editor of The New York Times (1994–2001), earning a Pulitzer Prize for Move Your Shadow, controversy over book Great Soul
- Children: 2 daughters

Joseph Salem Lelyveld (April 5, 1937 – January 5, 2024) was an American journalist. He was executive editor of The New York Times from 1994 to 2001, and interim executive editor in 2003 after the resignation of Howell Raines. He was a Pulitzer Prize–winning journalist and author, and a contributor to the New York Review of Books.

== Early life and education ==
Joseph Salem Lelyveld was born to a Jewish family in Cincinnati on April 5, 1937. His father was Arthur Lelyveld, a Reform Jewish rabbi and political activist. His parents separated and his father traveled much for his advocacy in politics, so Lelyveld was raised by other relatives, primarily in New York City. He earned a BA degree in English and an MA in American history from Harvard University in 1958 and 1959. He also received his MS degree from Columbia University in 1960.

== Career ==
=== The New York Times ===
In all, Lelyveld worked at The New York Times for nearly 40 years, beginning in 1962. At the Times, he went from copy editor to foreign correspondent within three years. He was also a foreign editor of The New York Times, and its managing editor.

=== Authorship ===
Among Lelyveld's books is Move Your Shadow: South Africa, Black and White, based on his reporting from Johannesburg, South Africa, in the 1960s and 1980s. He received the Pulitzer Prize for General Nonfiction in 1986 for Move Your Shadow.

Lelyveld's book Great Soul: Mahatma Gandhi and His Struggle with India (2011) was banned in the Indian state of Gujarat from publication for allegedly insinuating that the subject, Mahatma Gandhi, was in a homosexual or homophilic relationship. This ban received a unanimous vote in favor of the state of Gujarat in April 2011 by Gujarat's state assembly.

Lelyveld criticized the ban and rejected the allegations that his work claimed Gandhi to be homosexual or homophilic. He said:

The book does not say that Gandhi was bisexual or homosexual. It says that he was celibate and deeply attached to Kallenbach. This is not news.

== Personal life ==
Lelyveld was married to Carolyn Fox from 1959 until her death in 2004, and had two daughters. One of his daughters, Nita Lelyveld, became city editor of the Portland Press Herald in 2021.

Lelyveld was a first cousin of film critic Jonathan Rosenbaum; their mothers were sisters.

Lelyveld died from complications of Parkinson's disease at his home in Manhattan, on January 5, 2024, at the age of 86.

== Works ==
- "House of Bondage: A South African Black Man Exposes in His Own Pictures and Words the Bitter Life of His Homeland Today" (the foreword to a book by Ernest Cole). New York: Random House, 1967. LCCN 67-21147.
- Move Your Shadow: South Africa, Black and White New York: Crown Publishing Group, 1985. ISBN 978-0812912371.
- Omaha Blues: A Memory Loop. New York: Farrar, Straus and Giroux, 2005. ISBN 978-0374225902.
- Great Soul: Mahatma Gandhi and His Struggle with India Alfred A. Knopf, 2011. ISBN 978-0-307-26958-4.
- His Final Battle: The Last Months of Franklin Roosevelt Alfred A. Knopf, 2016. ISBN 978-0385350792.
