= Javier Moro =

Spanish author

Javier Moro (born 1955, Madrid) is a Spanish author known for his books like Pasión India.

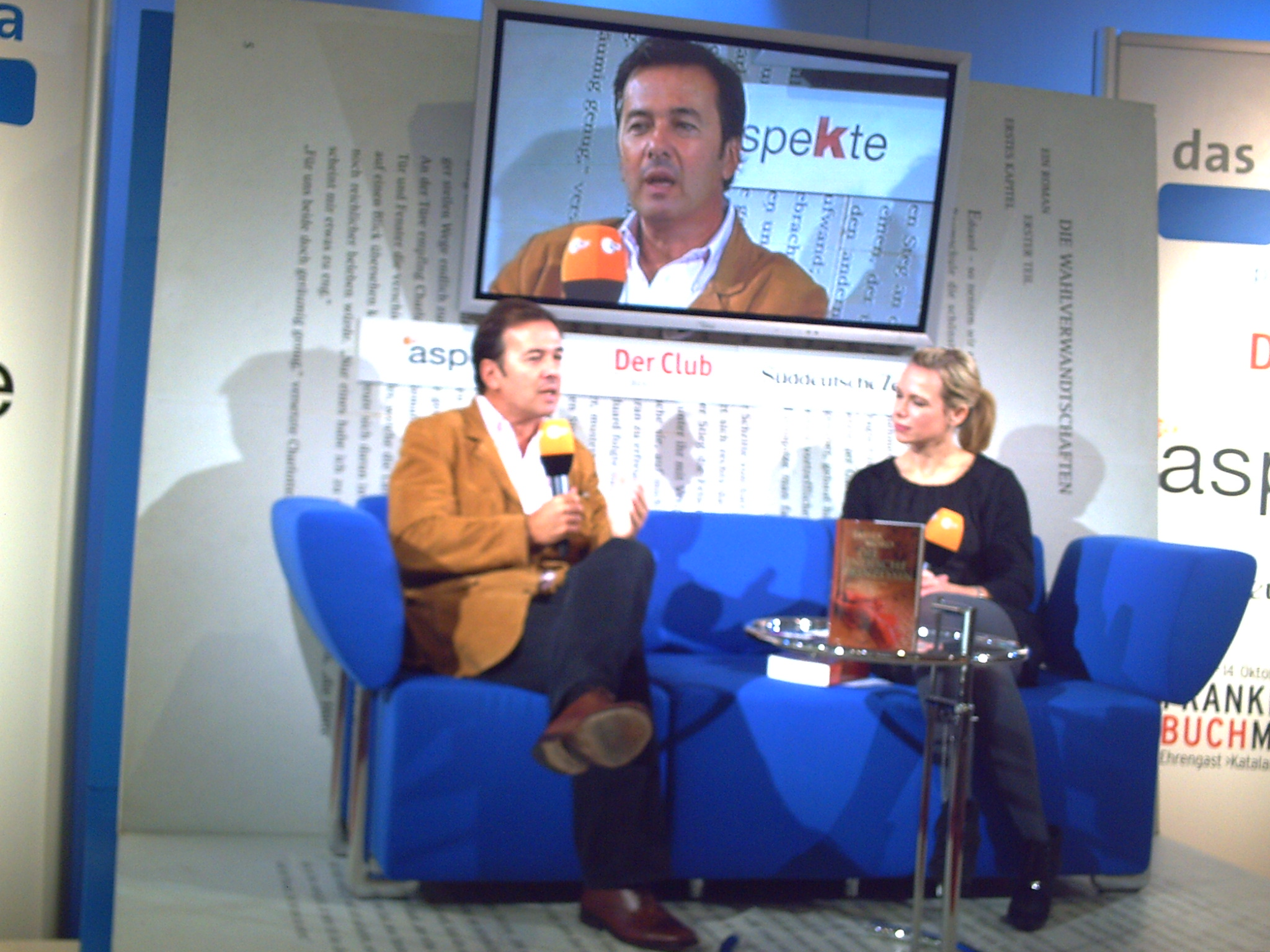
Picture of Javier Moro with a presenter.

== Life and work ==
Moro has collaborated with Dominique Lapierre and Larry Collins on various books. He was also the co-producer and screenwriter of the films Crónica del alba and Valentina, both of which were based on the works of Ramón J. Sender.

In 2002, Moro received the Christopher Award in NY for his book 'Five past midnight in Bhopal' together with Dominique Lapierre. In 2011, he was awarded the Premio Planeta award for his novel El imperio eres tú (The Empire, it's you), which is based on the life of Brazil's first emperor Dom Pedro I (1798-1834).

== Bibliography ==
- Senderos de libertad (Seix Barral, 1992)
- El pie de Jaipur (Seix Baral, 1995)
- Las montañas de Buda (Seix Barral, 1998)
- Era medianoche en Bhopal (2001) in collaboration with Dominique Lapierre
- Pasión India (Seix Barral, 2005)
- El sari rojo (Seix Barral, 2008)
- El imperio eres tú (Premio Planeta 2011)
- A flor de piel (Seix Barral, 2015)

== Controversies ==
His book, El sari rojo (The Red Sari) which is based on Sonia Gandhi's life, ran into some controversy in India. Moro's Spanish and Italian publishers received emails from Indian National Congress lawyers and spokesperson Abhishek Singhvi with demands to withdraw the book from stores. Singhvi stated that book distorted facts and misinterpreted details. Moro denied that the book is malicious. The book, finally was published in January 2015 in India, met a wide success.
