= Piotr Balcerowicz =

Polish orientalist

- Education: University of Warsaw
- Occupation: Professor of Oriental Studies
- Website: balcerowicz.eu

Piotr Balcerowicz is an orientalist, philosopher, professor at University of Warsaw and founder of the Association Education for Peace.

== Biography ==
He was active in the Federation of the Councils of Secondary Schools of Torun, created in autumn 1980, occurring against indoctrination in schools, which has also been involved in organizing self-education action.

In 1990 he graduated from the Warsaw University Oriental philology. In 1999 he obtained his Ph.D. from University of Hamburg, where he studied in 1992-1996. Former member of the Science Committee of Orientalist Polish Academy of Sciences. He is a lecturer in the Department of International Relations, Faculty of Humanities and Social Sciences at the University of Social Sciences and Humanities in Warsaw, and a professor at the Faculty of Oriental Studies University of Warsaw. Since 2002, founder and CEO of the Association Education for Peace.

== Publications ==
=== In Polish ===
- 2001: Afganistan. Historia-ludzie-polityka (Afghanistan. History-people-politics)
- 2003: Dżinizm. Starożytna religia Indii (Jainism. The ancient religion of India)
- 2003: Historia klasycznej filozofii indyjskiej. Część pierwsza: początki, nurty analityczne i filozofia przyrody (The history of classical Indian philosophy. Part One: origins, trends analysis and philosophy of nature)

=== In English ===
- 2009: Jainism and the definition of religion.
