= Five past Midnight in Bhopal =

1984 book by Dominique Lapierre

Five Past Midnight in Bhopal
- Author: Dominique Lapierre and Javier Moro
- Original title: Il était minuit cinq à Bhopal (French)
- Language: English
- Genre: Non-fiction, History
- Published: 2001 (Grand Central Publishing)
- Publication place: India, France
- Media type: Print
- Pages: 432pp (Hardcover)
- ISBN: 9780446530880

Five Past Midnight in Bhopal: The Epic Story of the World's Deadliest Industrial Disaster is a book by Dominique Lapierre and Javier Moro based on the 1984 Bhopal disaster. It was first published in 1997 and the English edition was published in 2001.

== Overview ==
The authors researched the book by living in Bhopal for three years in the late 1990s. They interviewed people from India and United States, who were witnesses and participants. The book starts by following a group of rural immigrants who traveled to Bhopal to escape the drought in their own villages and settled in the slums. The books also chronicles the invention of American firm Union Carbide's chemical pesticide, Sevin, which used methyl isocyanate and α-naphthol.

The book details the disaster which killed between 15,000 and 30,000. The narration follows characters like Padmini, an Oriya girl, who was to be married the night of the disaster in the slums, and Sister Felicity, a missionary from Scotland. The book also describes other characters like a tradesman who hired tents to offer some protection against the poison cloud and the railway station warden who tried to stop a train from halting there.

The final chapter follows the aftermath of the disaster. It tracks the people involved in the event, notably Warren Anderson, the chairman of Union Carbide at the time, and Warren Woomer, the supervisor of the factory in Bhopal.

== Film rights ==
In September 2001, it was reported that director Oliver Stone was in negotiation with Dominique Lapierre for film rights to the book.

== Defamation lawsuit in India ==
In July 2009, a Jabalpur court restrained the publication and sales of book in India, in an order directed at the authors and the local publishers of the book, Full Circle Publication. The order came after a former Director General of Police of Madhya Pradesh, Swaraj Puri, filed a defamation lawsuit for allegedly carrying defamatory remarks attributed to him. Puri was the Police Commissioner of Bhopal on the night of the disaster. In a joint statement, authors said the portions objected to by Puri had been substantiated by Moti Singh, who then the Collector of Bhopal and to whom Puri reported during the event, in his own 2008 book called Unfolding The Betrayal Of Bhopal Gas Tragedy.

Puri's lawyer, Rajesh Pancholi, stated that a legal noticed had been sent to the authors in 2002. But added that the legal proceedings were delayed because the authors lived abroad. He said that initially a demand of US$10 million had been sent to the authors via email as compensation for the damage to Puri's reputation. Later, the sum was doubled because there was no response. He also said that Puri was more interested in a public apology than any monetary compensation.

Pradeep Bakshi, the lawyer for Delhi-based Full Circle Publication, said that it was primarily a monetary issue. A spokesman from publishers denied that the book got any sales boost from the lawsuit, but alleged that the lawsuit was aimed to harass as it was filed in Jabalpur and their lawyer had to travel there. Another spokesman noted that Moti Singh's book was more damaging to Puri's reputation, yet no case was filed against him.

On 8 October 2009, Madhya Pradesh High Court lifted the restrain order from the lower courts, after hearing a petition from the authors and publisher which stated that there was no derogatory content about Puri in the book.

== See also ==
- Bhopal: A Prayer for Rain, a 2014 movie on the disaster
- Bhopal Express, 2000 film by Mahesh Mathai
