= The Polyester Prince =

Biography of Dhirubhai Ambani written by Hamish McDonald

- Author: Hamish McDonald
- Language: English
- Genre: Non-Fiction;Biography
- Published: 1998 (Allen & Unwin)
- Publication place: Australia
- Media type: Print (paperback)
- Pages: 297 pp
- ISBN: 1-86448-468-3; 978-1864484687
- Followed by: Ambani and Sons

The Polyester Prince: The Rise of Dhirubhai Ambani is a biography of the Indian business tycoon and founder of Reliance Industries Limited (RIL) Dhirubhai Ambani by Hamish McDonald, an Australian journalist and author. This book was published in 1998 in Australia by Allen & Unwin but never published in India.

HarperCollins India, the publisher who owned the rights to the Indian edition, halted all publication attempts after RIL applied for and secured temporary injunctions on the grounds of anticipatory defamation. This injunction was made with the argument that the material of the book contained allegations, unethical and corrupt business dealings with politicians and more that would leave Ambani defenceless for the damage it would cause harm to both his and his companies' reputation. The injunction application was passed by the Delhi High Court. HarperCollins pulped the printed yet unbound pages of the book after receiving further warnings that RIL would apply for further injunctions in all of India's twenty-two high courts and deciding it was not worth the cost to defend the book's publication rights. While the book was never made available to the public due to the injunction and warnings there are pirated photocopied versions available on the streets of Mumbai and New Delhi as well as online stores that now sell for prices above its original price sold in Australia.

McDonald published Ambani & Sons by Roli Books in India 12 years after The Polyester Prince with no legal issues. This sequel contained a sanitised version of the original's content as well as six new chapters pertaining to the events surrounding Ambani's sons and RIL after he died in 2002.

== Background ==
=== Dhirubhai Ambani and RIL ===
Dhirubhai Ambani (born 28 December 1932) was the child of school teachers in a small village in Gir Somnath, now known as Gujarat, India. Around the age of 17, Ambani travelled to Aden, Yemen, a former British colony on the Arabian Peninsula, to work at a trading firm called Antonin Besse and Company (Besse & Co.). Due to the 1947 partition of India and Pakistan, many Indian textile companies migrated to Bangladesh hindering the industry as the cotton mills were in Bombay. In 1957, Ambani founded Reliance Industries Limited (RIL) targeting the polyester industry due to the decrease in competitors after the 1947 partition and the Licence Raj. RIL since has expanded to undertake business deals and products consisting of energy, petrochemicals, natural resources and communications. Ambani died from a stroke in July 2002, passing the chairmanship of RIL to his sons Mukesh Ambani and Anil Ambani.

=== Hamish McDonald's coverage of Ambani ===
Hamish McDonald is an Australian journalist and author of many books about Indonesia and India. He lived in India from 1990 to 1996 working as the New Delhi bureau chief of the Far Eastern Economic Review (FEER) and now works as the Asia-Pacific editor for The Sydney Morning Herald newspaper. During his work for FEER, McDonald was invited to the wedding of Anil Ambani and Tina Munim in 1991. The initial relationship between McDonald, RIL and Ambani centred on documenting the company's expansion into international markets. In 1992 McDonald decided that he wanted to write a book on Ambani and the interconnections with business and politics. Ambani and Reliance approved of the idea, with the understanding that for this project to go forward Ambani would have the final say.

The following year, rumours began to circulate that the government was rigged in favour of RIL to obtain oil exploration contracts. McDonald wrote articles about the Panna-Mukta oil fields, damaging his relationship with Ambani who described them as "defamatory" without taking any legal action at the time. As a result, Ambani and RIL distanced themselves from McDonald and cut off networking connections.

== Synopsis ==
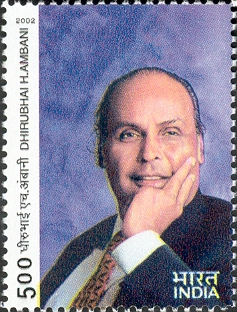
A stamp of India dedicated to Dhirubhai Ambani by the Ministry of Communications, Government of India in 2002

The Polyester Prince chronicles Dhirubhai Ambani's life from childhood to founder of RIL following India's independence in 1947, and highlights how India's post-independence industry development was achieved by both fair and foul means.

The first section of the book explores the events of Ambani's young adult life that influenced his understanding of business and developed his skillset that later went on to help him found RIL. This section explores how the mixture of Ambani's working experience as a young adult at trading companies along with post-independence India's changing business landscape lead to Ambani's debut in the wealthy social circles of India and rise in his power.

The latter part of the book centers on Ambani's different business dealings, both successful and criticised as he founds and expands RIL. Throughout the book, McDonald describes the ethical costs associated with Ambani's management of the political environment using his status in wealthy social circles that included politicians, stock market speculators and more to path the way for RIL to become India's largest private-sector conglomerate.

== Release ==
=== Composition and publication ===
In July 1995 McDonald quit his job working at FEER to devote full time to the development of his book. McDonald and his unfavourable relationship with Ambani was made evident in 1996 when he went to interview Ratibhai Muchhala who worked as the export manager for Ambani. However, upon reaching Muchhala's office, McDonald was met with Dinesh Sheth, Dhirubhai's personal assistant at the time who explained that Ambani would prefer this project to cease development. McDonald continued to investigate Ambani through talking to individuals such as Ambani's main competitors like Nusli Wadia, the owner of Bombay Dyeing in an attempt to understand Ambani's actions during the polyester wars. McDonald continued to connect the life events of Ambani through Ambani's colleagues, rivals and even the former Prime Minister Vishwanath Pratap Singh after realising that McDonald's book was not a hagiography of Dhirubhai Ambani. The original book received criticism on the sources behind McDonalds writing as it sourced media reports and interviewing Ambani's competitors which may have skewed the writing to negatively portray Ambani.

In 1997, before McDonald finished his final manuscript of The Polyester Prince: The Rise of Dhirubhai Ambani he was met with a letter from Kanga & Co, the lawyers of Ambani and Reliance Industries. This letter detailed that their client believes the information in the proposed publication would generate unwelcome media which would not only negatively impact their client and his families name but also potentially harm RIL. Ambani described the upcoming book to contain defamatory information due to the current unfavourable relationship between the author and Ambani after the release of McDonalds articles in 1993 on the Panna-Mukta oil fields. Finally, this letter served as a warning that if the book would attempt to be published will be met with legal actions in the form of injunctions. McDonald ignored these warnings and continued to work on his manuscript. RIL, however, continued to fight the upcoming publication of the book by sending further letters from Ashurt Australia, their lawyers based in Sydney, Australia, to Allen & Unwin, McDonald Australian publishers repeating that the information contained in the proposed publishment would induce injuries to Ambani and RIL that they could not defend. Patrick Gallagher, the founder and chairman of Allen & Unwin proceeded with the publication of The Polyester Prince: The Rise of Dhirubhai Ambani, beginning the initial print of 3,000 copies in 1997 and finally publishing the book in early 1998 in Australia. HarperCollins India, the Indian editors of the book and the holder of the Indian rights had finished editing the manuscript and had printing pages that were yet to be bound into a book was met with legal trouble from RIL which halted its publication in India.

=== Legal injunction on publication in India ===
RIL and Ambani applied for a legal injunction from the Ahmedabad and Delhi High Courts towards the publishment of the book in India on the anticipatory grounds that the publication contained defamatory material towards both RIL and Dhirubhai Ambani. The Delhi High Court passed a verdict in favour with RIL and Ambani's, allowing them to procure a temporary injunction against publication. This temporary injunction restricted the publishment of the book for a while however upon the approval of the temporary injunction HarperCollins removed printed pages of the book and halted all publication attempts. Allen & Unwin would not stop the publishment of the book in Australia however would not attempt to publish the book within Indian jurisdictions.

Upon a meeting with Renuka Chatterjee, who was heading HarperCollins India at the time told McDonald that they received further legal threats along with pre-publication injunction notices on the grounds of anticipated defamation that threatened that RIL would apply for these injunctions in all twenty-two Indian high courts. Saying that

''As of now the book is not happening. The matter is sub judice. The Ambanis’ have secured an injunction in the Delhi High Court against the publication."

HarperCollins India was not prepared to defend the book as the publishment case could continue over several years and become costly. As a result, they withdrew the book and halted its publication which resulted in the book never being released to Indian markets.

=== Pirated versions found In India ===
Due to the injunctions on the Indian version of the book it was never made available on public markets for purchase however the injunction has seemed to increase its value. In recent years pirated photocopied versions have appeared on Mumbai and Delhi's streets for prices ranging from Rs 50 to Rs 1,600 (approximately US$0.69 to US$22). Moreover, the available copies on internet sites such as Amazon were selling for up to US$500 due to the unauthorised content it contained. Ambani & Sons, the sequel to the book was published in 2010 and contained similar content to its predecessor however had certain allegations, scandals and more that were found in the original removed.

== Sequel ==
Ambani & Sons was published by Roli Books in India in 2010 and published by NewSouth Publishing as Mahabharata in Polyester: The Making of the World’s Richest Brothers and Their Feud in Australia. This book was widely considered to be the sequel to The Polyester Prince: The Rise of Dhirubhai Ambani as it includes the original 17 chapters with an additional six chapters pertaining to the events following Dhirubhai Ambani's death in 2002, Ambani's sons, Mukesh and Anil Ambani.

Ambani & Sons consists of 23 chapters split into two sections. The first 17 chapters chronicle the rise of Dhirubhai Ambani from childhood to a business tycoon with large commercial success. The first section of the book explores how the stock markets were manipulated, competitors harassed and other unethical business partners and corruption that occurred and resulted in RIL obtaining a large market share in the Indian marketplace. The new six chapters follow Anil and Mukesh Ambanis’ feud over the Reliance group.

There are a few differences between the Indian and Australian publications of the sequel due to Pramod Kapur, the founder and publisher of Roli Books, asking McDonald to remove some controversial passages that were found in The Polyester Prince such as the attempted murder allegation of Nusli Wadia. Such controversial passages still appear in the Australian publication of the book. As a result of the sanitation of Ambani & Sons along with fight between Mukesh Ambani and Anil Ambani that has gained large attention from the media, this book was not met with the same legal threats as The Polyester Prince.
