= Hamish McDonald =

Australian journalist and author

Hamish McDonald is an Australian journalist and author of several books. He held a fellowship at the American think tank the Woodrow Wilson Centre in 2014.

== Career ==
McDonald has worked as a journalist in mostly Asian countries like India, Japan, Indonesia, Hong Kong and China, where he was a correspondent based in Beijing from 2002 to 2005. He was in India between 1990 and 1997, covering the time immediately after the economic reforms. He was the political editor for the Far Eastern Economic Review and the foreign editor for the Sydney Morning Herald.

In 2005, he won the Walkley Award for newspaper feature writing for his article "What's Wrong With Falun Gong", which is about the brutal suppression of the Falun Gong religious movement in China.

== Bibliography ==
- McDonald, Hamish (1980). Suharto's Indonesia.
- The Polyester Prince, 1998: This unauthorized biography of Dhirubhai Ambani never went to print in India after the publishers were threatened with legal action by the Ambani family.
- Death in Balibo, Lies in Canberra, 2001: Co-authored with Desmond Ball
- Masters of Terror: Indonesia's Military & Violence in East Timor in 1999, 2002
- McDonald, Hamish & Desmond O'Grady (Autumn 2010). "Between two worlds". Reportage. Griffith Review. 27.
- Mahabharata in Polyester: The Making of the World’s Richest Brothers and Their Feud, 2010: The book was published in India as Ambani and Sons.
- A War of Words, University of Queensland Press, 2014.
- Demokrasi: Indonesia in the 21st Century, St. Martin's Press, 2015.
- Melanesia: Travels in Black Oceania, Hurst Publishers, 2025.
