= List of Manipal Academy of Higher Education alumni =

Manipal Academy of Higher Education has produced many alumni from engineering to science to literature.

== Academics ==
- Annapoorna Kini, American cardiologist and a professor of Cardiology at Mount Sinai School of Medicine in New York City.

== Art And Music ==
- Nag Ashwin, film director and screenwriter
- Anu Choudhury, actress
- Sandeep Mukherjee, Los Angeles based artist
- Arun Shenoy, Grammy Award-nominated musician

== Business ==
- Rajeev Suri, former CEO and chairman of Nokia CEO of Inmarsat
- Satya Nadella, CEO and Chairman of Microsoft
- Anant J Talaulicar, president and CEO, Cummins India Ltd.
- Rajeev Chandrasekhar, multimillionaire entrepreneur and politician
- Devi Shetty, billionaire, cardiologist and founder of Narayana Health

Balaji Krishnamurthy, CFO of Uber

== Others ==
- Vikas Khanna, Michelin Guide Star Chef
- Sheikh Muszaphar Shukor, Malaysian orthopedic surgeon and the first Malaysian astronaut.
- Disha Oberoi, popularly known as R J Disha, is a Radio Jockey from Bangalore, India.
