= H. S. Ballal =

Indian radiologist and academic administrator

- Born: 25 June 1941 (age 84); Hebri
- Education: Bachelor of Medicine, Bachelor of Surgery
- Spouse: Indira Ballal
- Children: 2
- Relatives: H. Sudarshan Ballal (brother)
- Awards: Aryabhata Award; New year Award; IBM inspiring Vice Chancellor of the Year

Hebri Subhaskrishna Ballal is an Indian administrator, radiologist and pro chancellor of the Manipal University and chairman of FICCI - Higher Education Committee.

== Early life ==
Ballal is an ethnic Bunt and hails from the Hebri Beedu family, the chief landowners of Hebri in Udupi district. He is the eldest among five sons of Prafulla and Belinje Sanjiva Hegde. He is married to Indira Ballal and has two children: son Sandeep Ballal and daughter Supriya Shetty. His youngest brother is H. Sudarshan Ballal.

Ballal graduated with an MBBS from Mysore Medical College and post graduated with DMRD and MD in radio-diagnosis from Government Medical College, Bangalore.

== Career ==
In April 1997, Ballal was appointed associate dean of the Kasturba Medical College, Mangalore, and subsequently, in 2001, was elevated as its dean and on 1 September 2003, he was appointed to the distinguished position of vice chancellor of Manipal University. From July 2006, he has been elevated to the position of pro chancellor.

Ballal has been an active member of Indian Medical Association (IMA). In 1987 he was elected as President of IMA, South Canara Branch and the vice-president of Karnataka State Indian Radiological and Imaging Association. He is a member of Central Council of Indian Radiological and Imaging Assoc. and member of the national advisory board of Indian Journal of Radiology. In 2001, as Chairman of the Indian Radiological and Imaging Association organising Committee, he successfully conducted its annual conference at Manipal with over 1500 delegates participating in the conference. He is also the chairman of the Higher Education Committee constituted by Federation of Indian Chambers of Commerce & Industry, New Delhi and also the Member of the Committee set up for National School of Pharmacy by the Pharmacy Council of India. He is a member of the National Centenary Celebration Committee of The Trained Nurses' Association of India, New Delhi.

== Awards and honours ==
- New Year Award 2008(instituted by the Academy of General Education, Rotary Club and Syndicate Bank)
- Aryabhatta award
