= H. Sudarshan Ballal =

Indian nephrologist (born 1954)

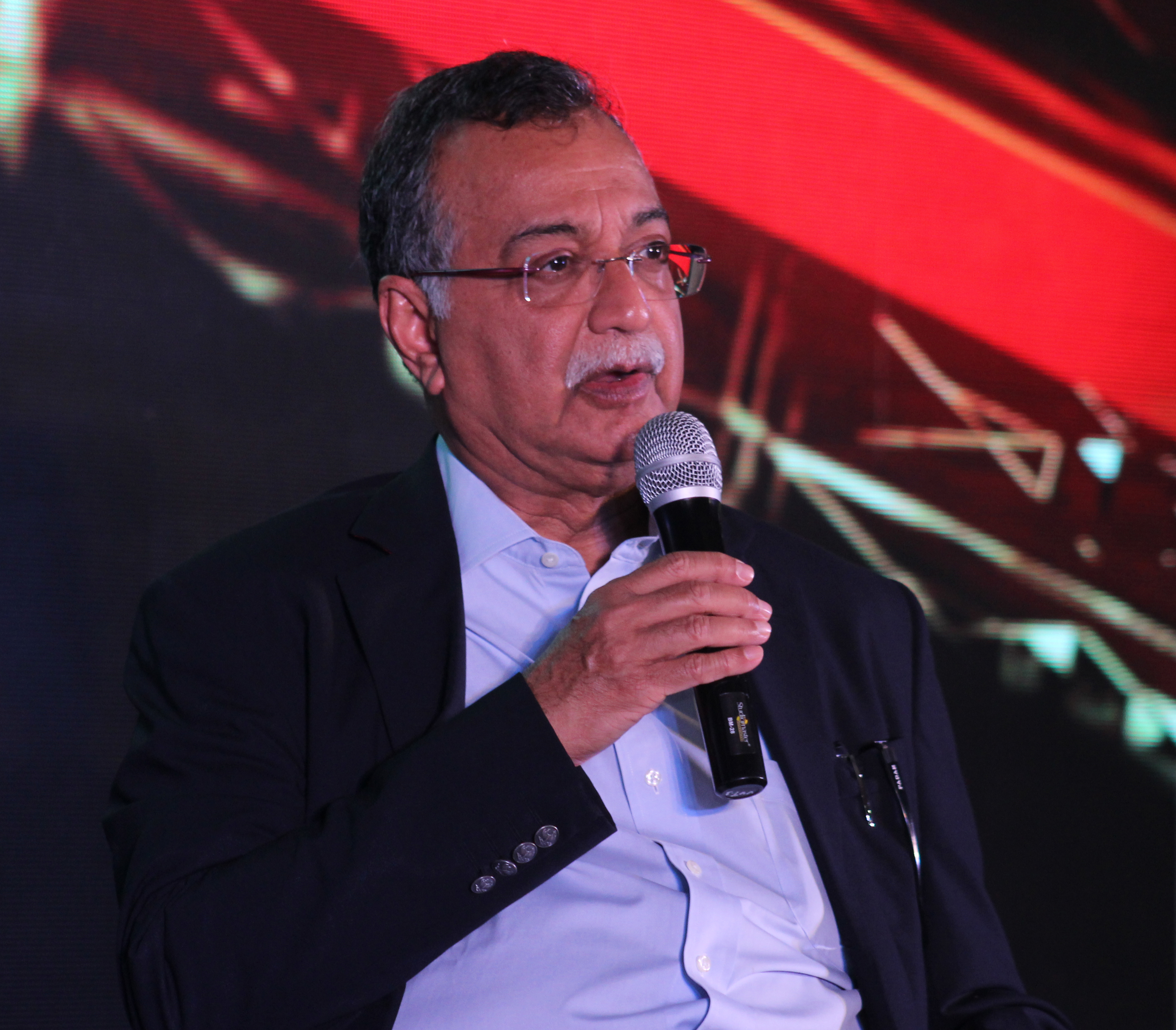
- Ballal in 2018
- Born: 15 September 1954 (age 72); Udupi, Mysuru State (present-day Karnataka), India
- Occupations: Physician, nephrologist
- Years active: 1986–present
- Known for: First cadaver kidney transplantation in Karnataka; Triple Board certified in Internal Medicine, Nephrology, Critical Care; Set up the first postgraduate center in Nephrology in Karnataka
- Relatives: H. S. Ballal (brother)

H. Sudarshan Ballal FRCP (born 15 September 1954) is an Indian kidney transplant physician, nephrologist currently director of Manipal Institute of Nephrology and Urology, the chairman of the Medical Advisory Board of Manipal Hospitals Group and Senate Member of Manipal University, now known as Manipal Academy of Higher Education (MAHE).

Ballal is the adjunct professor of medicine at MAHE, a Clinical Professor of Medicine at Saint Louis University Medical Centre, Chairman of the Board at Stempeutics Research Pvt. Ltd. and examiner for the Royal College of Physicians London.

== Early life and career ==
Ballal was born in Udupi, a coastal district of Karnataka, India. He received his Bachelor of Medicine, Bachelor of Surgery (MBBS) degree from Kasturba Medical College, Manipal in 1977 and won the T. M. A. Pai Gold Medal for the Best Outgoing Student for the year 1976. After completing his MBBS degree he went to the United States for further study to gain a Doctor of Medicine (M.D.) degree. His US teachers accepted his training in India very well and his three-year program was relaxed by a year and he completed his M.D. in just two years. After obtaining his M.D degree, he did his residency at Deaconess Hospital, St. Louis, Missouri. He then pursued his Fellowship in Nephrology at St. Louis University Medical Centre.

== Later career ==
Ballal performed the first cadaver kidney transplant in Karnataka.

His department at Manipal Hospitals performs more than four thousand kidney dialysis procedures every month. The two-year training program in Nephrology started by Ballal in 1999 is recognised by the National Board and Rajiv Gandhi University. He was conferred with the Teacher of Excellence Award, 2014 by the National Board of Examination.

Ballal regularly contributes as a columnist to various newspapers.

He is the member of the Consultative Group on the COVID-19 pandemic, providing advice to the government on fighting coronavirus.

Ballal actively supports Prime Minister Narendra Modi's Ayushman Bharat Yojana campaign.

== Philanthropy ==
Ballal has been involved in CSR activities to help economically disadvantaged sections of society and of those with serious kidney issues unable to access good quality medical care. He launched free Pediatric Kidney Transplants (Kidney Transplants for children) for disadvantaged sections of the society in a joint program with Belanje Sanjeeva Hegde Trust and Manipal Hospitals, Bangalore. He has been consulted on plans for health policies for poor people to ensure continued free access coverage for all diseases.

== Awards and achievements ==
In 2005, Ballal was awarded Udupi District Rajyotsava Award and in 2016 the prestigious Kannada Rajyotsava Award by the Government of Karnataka for his contributions to the field of Medicine. He was elected, in 2009, a Fellow of the Royal College of Physicians of London.

He has also been received:

- Namma Bengaluru Award, February 2010
- Padma Awards nominee 2014
