= B. M. Hegde =

Indian cardiologist

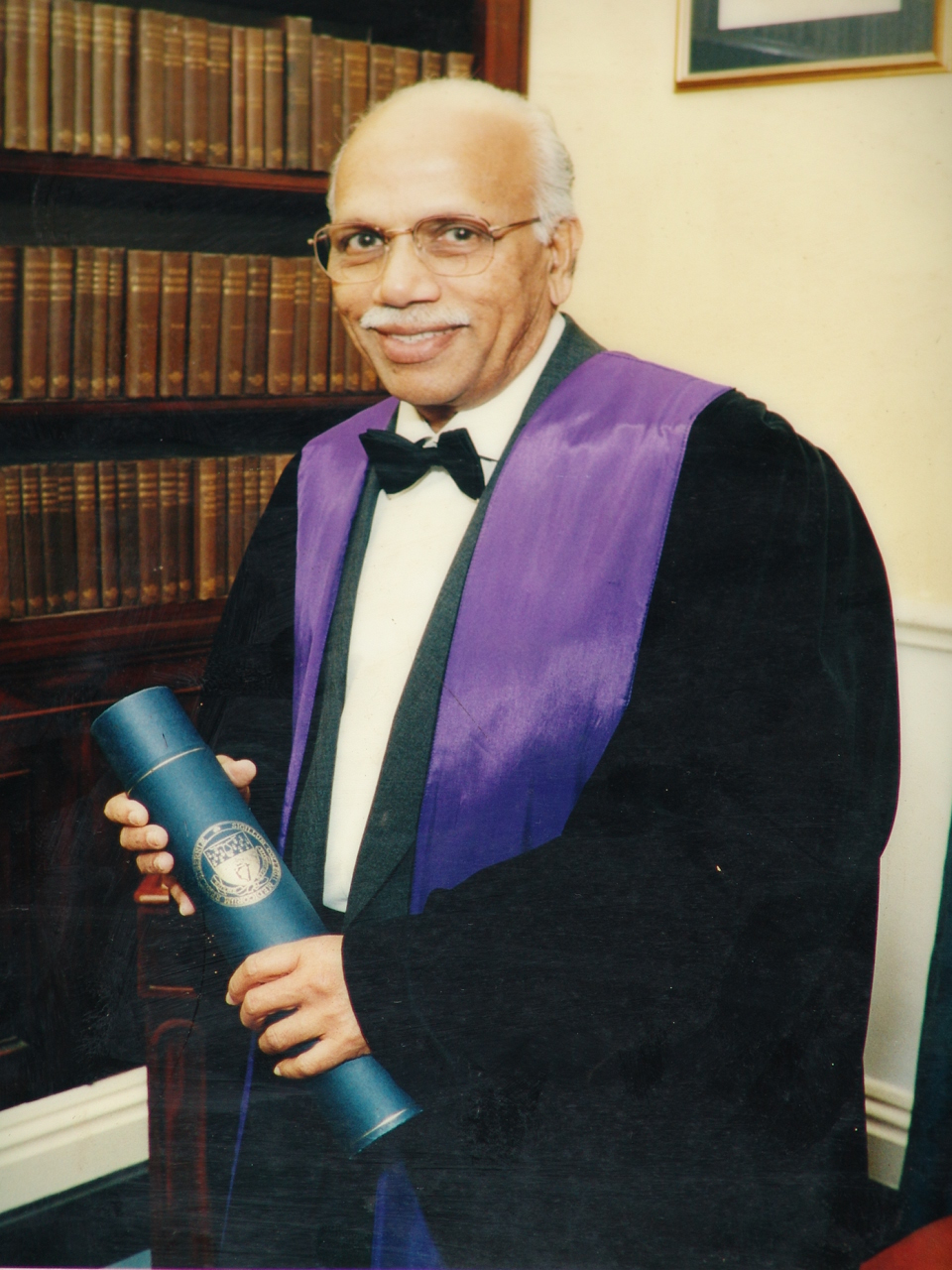
- Hegde in 2005
- Born: 18 August 1938 (age 88); Udupi, Karnataka, India
- Education: King George Medical College; Stanley Medical College
- Medical career
- Profession: Cardiologist; professor of medicine; author
- Institutions: Manipal Academy of Higher Education; Kasturba Medical College; Bharatiya Vidya Bhavan, Mangalore Branch
- Awards: 2021 Padma Vibhushan; 2010 Padma Bhushan; 1999 Dr. B. C. Roy Award for Eminent Teachers; 1997 Rajyotsava Award

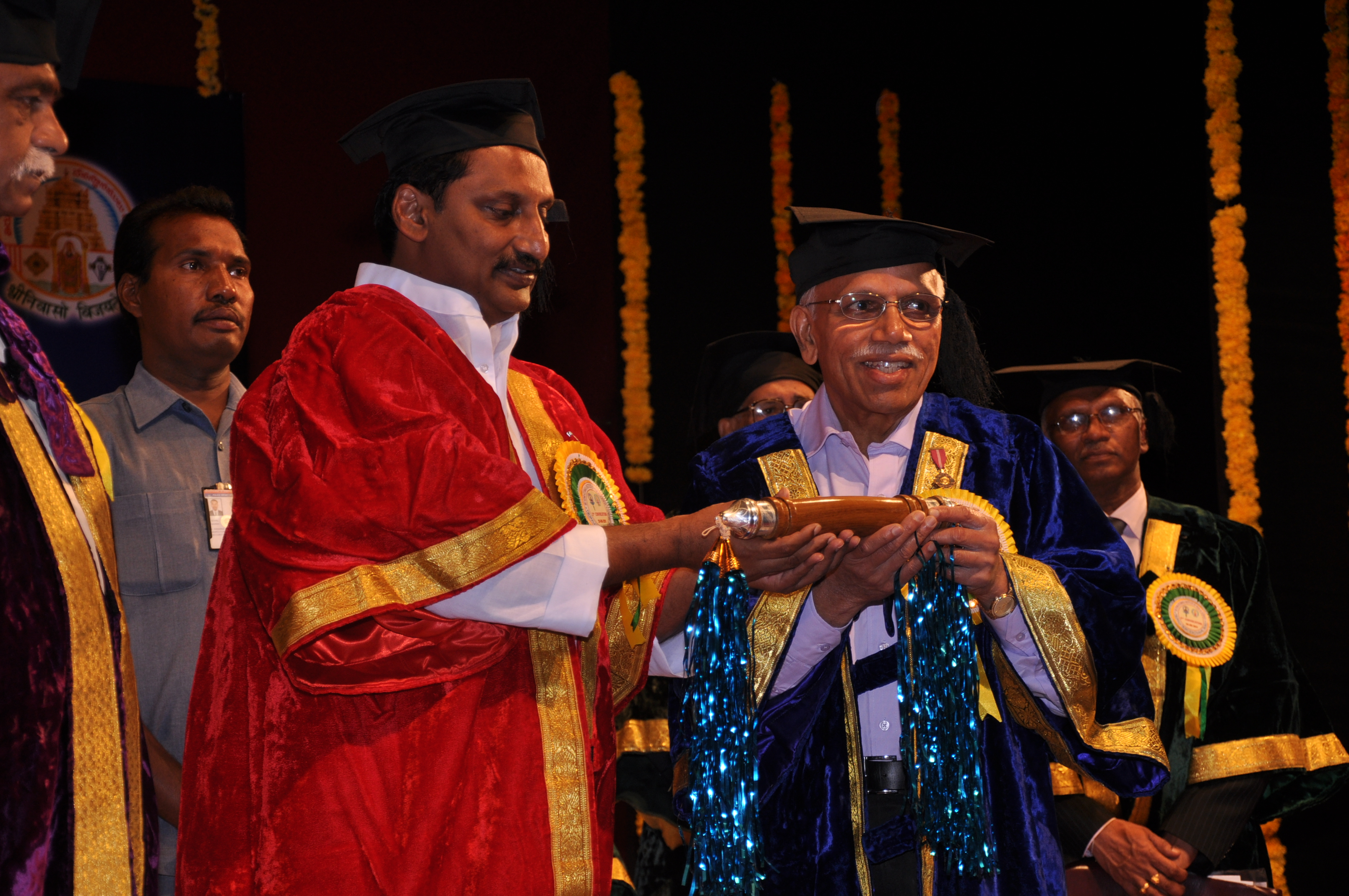
B M Hegde being conferred an honorary doctorate by Kiran Kumar Reddy

Belle Monappa Hegde (born 18 August 1938) is an Indian cardiologist, professor of medicine, and author. He was the vice chancellor of Manipal Academy of Higher Education from 1999 to 2003. He was awarded Padma Bhushan in 2010 and Padma Vibhushan in 2021. He has supported homeopathy a pseudoscientific system of alternative medicine and quantum healing.

== Early life ==
Hegde was born on 18 August 1938 in Pangala near Udupi, Karnataka, India He obtained MBBS from Stanley Medical College, Madras in 1960 and later M.D. from King George’s Medical College, University of Lucknow

== Career ==
Over a long career at Kasturba Medical College, Mangalore, Hegde served in various positions such as professor, principal and dean. He was appointed the vice chancellor of Manipal Academy of Higher Education in 1999 and served till 2003. He was an independent director of Zydus Wellness. He also served as chairman of an expert committee of Bihar State Health Society

He was the chairman of Mangaluru branch of Bharatiya Vidya Bhavan. He started a medical journal, Journal of the Science of Healing Outcomes and serves as its editor-in-chief. Hegde was a fellow of the National Academy of Medical Sciences till 2016.

B.M. Hegde is a member of the selection jury of Mahaveer Awards instituted by Bhagwan Mahaveer Foundation.

== Pseudoscience and controversies ==
He has proposed that 'quantum healing' can bring sick persons back to normal, a concept widely regarded in the scientific community as pseudoscientific.

In 2019, when Hegde was invited to deliver a lecture on "Sauce of Happiness" at the campus of Indian Institute of Technology, Madras, he was called a proponent of "pseudo-science and quackery" by a group of research scholars, who questioned his criticism of modern medicine and accused him of promoting unverified treatments for various ailments. Hegde said it showed "how much the protesters knew about science."

His TEDx talk on "Change is life" was flagged by TED as containing medical fallacies and sweeping generalizations. TED said that the assertions made in the talk lacked legitimate scientific support.

Hegde has also written articles and given talks in support of homeopathy. Hegde argues that even if one thinks incorrectly that Homeopathy is a placebo, it is still important, as most modern medicine is worse than placebo.

== Bibliography ==
- Wisdom of the human body. Gandhi Centre of Science and Human Values of Bharatiya Vidya Bhavan. 2001. pp. 148 pages.
- What Doctors Don't Get to Study in Medical School. Anshan. 2006. pp. 275 pages. ISBN 978-1-904798-84-2.
- Hypertension: Assorted Topics. Bharatiya Vidya Bhavan. 1995. pp. 108 pages.
- The Heart Manual. UBS Publishers' Distributors. 2000. pp. 157 pages.
- You Can Be Healthy. Macmillan Publishers India Limited. 2004. pp. 208 pages. ISBN 978-1-4039-2233-5.
- How To Maintain Good Health. UBS Publishers' Distributors Pvt. Ltd. ISBN 978-81-7476-069-2.
- Modern Medicine and Ancient Indian Wisdom. Manipal Academy of Higher Education. 2000.
- Holistic Living. Bharatiya Vidya Bhavan. pp. 117 pages. ISBN 978-81-7276-024-3.
- Art Of Public Speaking. Bharatiya Vidya Bhavan. ISBN 978-81-7276-054-0.
