= Tanushka Singh =

Indian Air Force officer

Tanushka Singh (born 2001) is a woman pilot from Uttar Pradesh, India. She is the first woman pilot to be inducted into the Indian Air Force’s (IAF) Jaguar fighter jet squadron. She is a flying officer.

== Early life ==
Singh was born in Uttar Pradesh but is residing in Mangaluru from 2007. Her father, a retired lieutenant colonel Ajay Pratap Singh, and grandfather, retired captain Devendra Bahadur Singh, served in the Indian Army. She did her schooling at DPS MRPL School in Surathkal and later completed her pre-university course at Sharada PU College in Mangaluru. She graduated in BTech in electrical and electronics engineering from Manipal Institute of Technology, Mangaluru in 2022. She was a cadet of the NCC at the college.

== Career ==
She passed the Short Service Commission and underwent 18 months of training at the Air Force Academy in Dundigal, Medchal-Malkajgiri district, Telangana. She later took specialised training on the Hawk MK 132 aircraft.
