= Wenlock District Hospital =

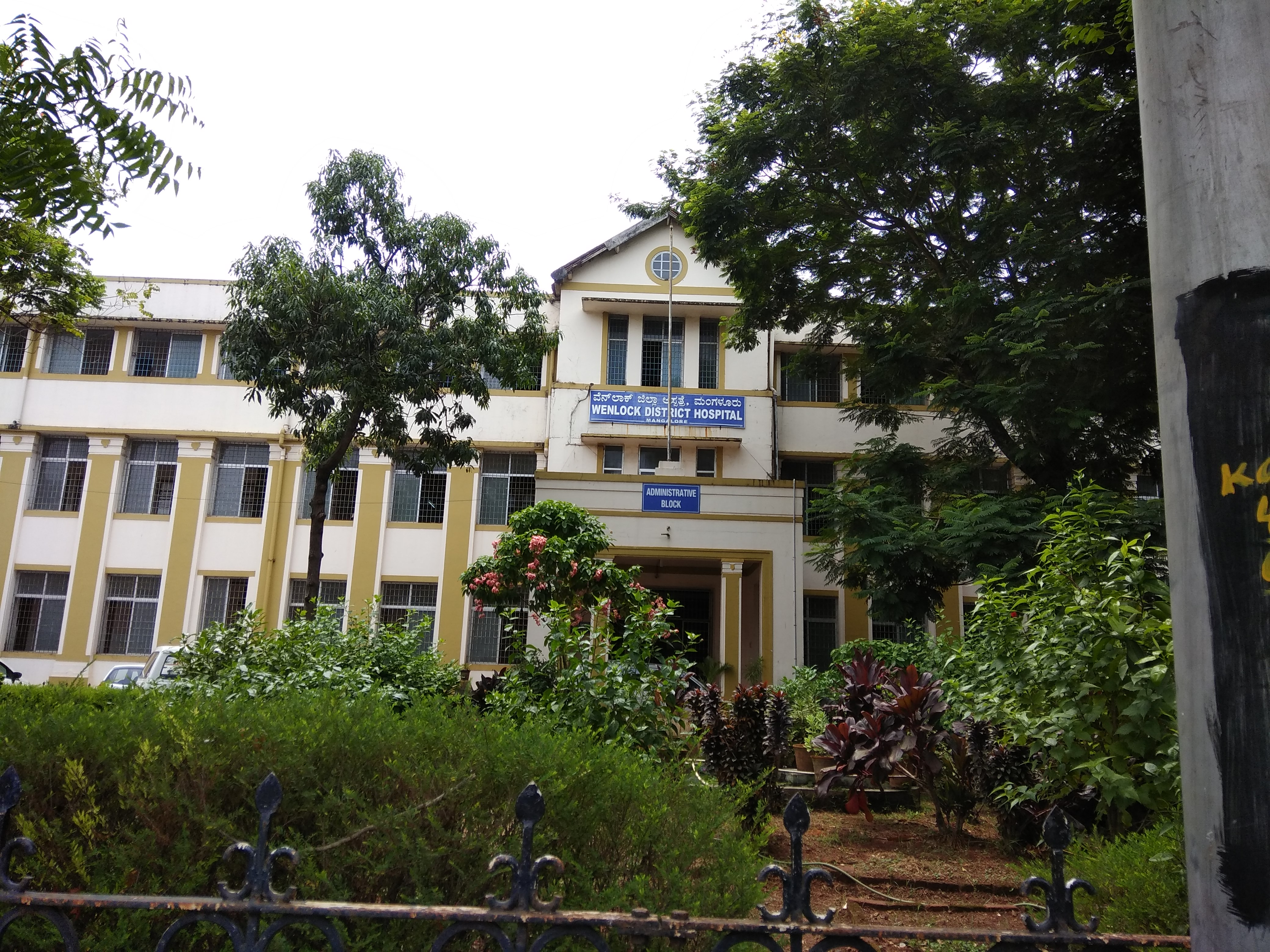
- Wenlock Hospital

Geography
- Location: Mangaluru, Karnataka, India
- Coordinates: 12°52′01″N 74°50′31″E

Organisation
- Type: General, Government hospital

Services
- Beds: 1000

History
- Founded: 1848

Links
- Lists: Hospitals in India

Wenlock District Hospital is a hospital in Mangaluru, Karnataka, India. Established in 1848, it was acquired by the Madras government in 1891. It contains more than 1000 beds as of 2021. It is a teaching hospital of the Kasturba Medical College, Mangaluru.

== History ==
The hospital named after the then governor, Beilby Lawley, 3rd Baron Wenlock was established in 1848 during the British Raj when Mangaluru was a part of the Madras Presidency. After India's independence, the hospital came under control of the Madras State. In 1955, T. M. A. Pai, the founder of Manipal Academy of Higher Education established the Kasturba Medical College with Wenlock Hospital as the teaching hospital. Mangalore became a part of the Mysore state in 1956.

Wenlock hospital in 1956

== Teaching Hospital ==
The hospital is India's oldest example of a public-private partnership in medical education. KMC Mangalore has signed a Memorandum of Understanding with the Government of Karnataka to use the hospital as a teaching hospital and the college provides healthcare staff and laboratory facilities. The state, through the Karnataka Examinations Authority is the counselling authority for 20% of the MBBS seats at KMC Mangalore.

== See also ==
- Healthcare in India
- Medical Education in India
