= Mahesh Shahdadpuri =

Indian entrepreneur

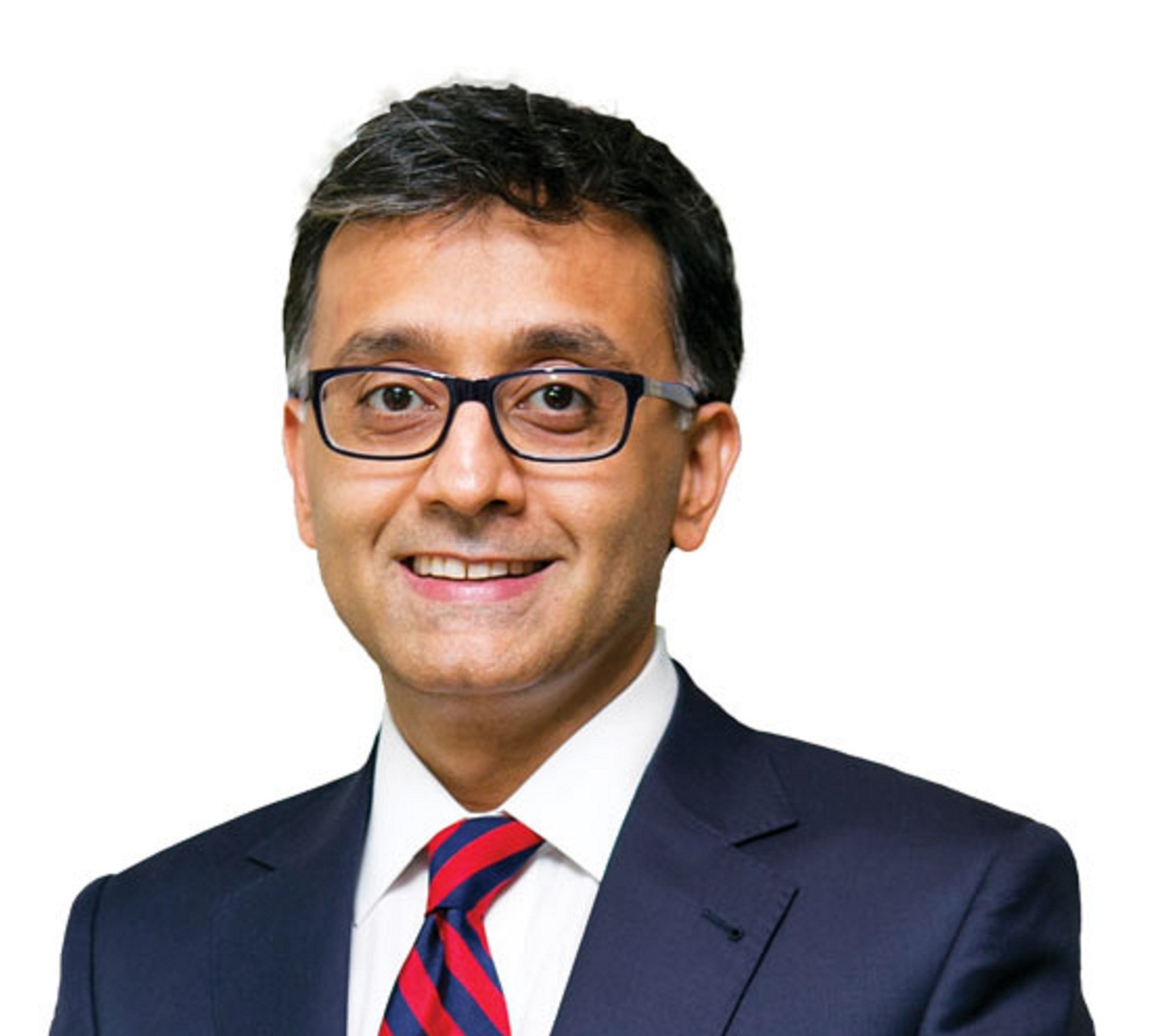
- Shahdadpuri in 2018
- Born: December 13, 1969 (age 56); New Delhi, India
- Education: Manipal Institute of technology and Boston University
- Occupation: Entrepreneur
- Known for: Founder of TASC Outsourcing
- Spouse: Payal Shahdadpuri
- Children: 2

Mahesh Shahdadpuri (born 13 December 1969) is an Indian entrepreneur who is the founder of TASC Outsourcing, a staffing company in the Middle East headquartered in Dubai. As well as founder he is the CEO of TASC Outsourcing and a director on the board of the Nikai group of companies.

In 2017, Forbes ranking as one of the Top 100 Indian Business Owners in the Arab World. He also received the Sheikh Khalifa Excellence Award 2016, and Innovator of the Year 2016 by Entrepreneur Middle East, among others.

== Early life and education ==
Shahdadpuri was born on 13 December 1969 in New Delhi. He spent his childhood growing up in India, China, US, Saudi Arabia and Libya. He was sent to a boarding school at an early age. In 1992 he received an engineering degree in electronics and telecommunications at Manipal Institute of technology and then headed to the US for an MBA in Marketing and Entrepreneurship at Boston University.

== Career ==
Shahdadpuri worked in the United States for Digital Equipment Corporation’s semiconductor facility in Hudson, Massachusetts which was sold later to Intel Corporation. After leaving Digital in 1999 he founded a software company called Ad Astrum Technologies based in New York City and Bangalore.

In November 2007, Shahdadpuri incorporated TASC Outsourcing in Dubai, which grew rapidly to become one of the largest staffing and outsourcing companies in the Middle East.

After founding TASC Outsourcing in Dubai in November 2007, Shahdadpuri expanded the company to become one of the largest providers of contract, permanent, and remote professionals in the Middle East. The company now boasts over 10,500 employees from more than 78 different nationalities covering 76 job functions and serves over 550 businesses in the region. In addition to TASC, Shahdadpuri launched AIQU, a leading tech recruitment agency, and Future Milez, a transformative last-mile delivery solution company. He also oversees TASC Corporate Services, which provides critical compliance operations to organizations of all scales.

Shahdadpuri is responsible for launching the region's first online temporary staff hiring portal: TascTemp. It is an innovative new service that was launched on 18 September 2017 in a PR event in Dubai, United Arab Emirates.

== Recognition ==
The following is the list of awards and recognition received by Shahdadpuri:

- Dubai Quality Appreciation Award (2020)
- Sheikh Mohammed bin Rashid al Maktoum Business Award (2019)
- Sheikh Khalifa Excellence award for Business Excellence (2018)
- Arabian Business: Dubai 100 Most Influential People (2018)
- Forbes top 100 Indian Business Owners in the Arab world (2018)
- Bloomberg Businessweek ME 2018 recognizes Mahesh Shahdadpuri as the 'Game Changer of Outsourcing in the Middle East 2018'
- Winner of the Best Website Launch of the Year 2018 for tasctemp.com
- Forbes top 100 Indian Business Owners in the Arab world (2017)
- Sheikh Khalifa Excellence award for Business Excellence (2016)
- Forbes top 100 Indian leaders in the Arab world (2015)
- Asia and the Pacific entrepreneurship award (2015)
- CEO Middle East Award (2014)
- LinkedIn top 10 most influential brands in the UAE
- I.T. Innovator of the year by the Entrepreneur magazine(2014)
- Dubai SME 100 award 2013
- Arabia Fast 500 winner for 2012

== Affiliations and Media Presence ==
Mahesh Shahdadpuri serves on the Boston University Advisory Board and is a regular speaker on entrepreneurship at various educational institutions. He is the Chair of YPO MENA Gold and a charter member of TiE. Mahesh is a sought-after spokesperson in the Outsourcing and Staffing industry, frequently featured in major media outlets such as Dubai One TV, Dubai Eye 103.8 FM, The National, and Gulf News.

== Personal life ==
Outside of his professional endeavors, Shahdadpuri enjoys a range of activities including cooking, running, working out, and hiking. He is also an avid tennis player and has a passion for molecular gastronomy, as well as racing both bikes and cars.
