= Everest Industries =

Indian building materials manufacturer company pvt ltd

Everest Industries Limited
- Type: Public
- Traded as: NSE: EVERESTIND; BSE: 508906
- Industry: Building materials
- Founded: 1934; 92 years ago
- Headquarters: Mumbai, Maharashtra, India
- Key people: Anant J Talaulicar (chairman) Rajesh Joshi (CEO, MD & director) Pramod Nair(CFO)
- Revenue: ▲₹1,685.46 crore (US$180 million) (2023)
- Operating income: ▲₹1,645 crore (US$170 million) (2023)
- Total assets: ▲₹1,133.35 crore (US$120 million) (2023)
- Number of employees: 1400+ (2024)
- Subsidiaries: Everest Buildpro Private Limited; Everest Steel Building Private Limited; Everest Building Products; Everestind FZE
- Website: www.everestind.com

Everest Industries Limited, is an Indian company that manufactures building materials. It has a presence in around 35 countries and employs around 1400 employees. Everest Industries operates these business segments: roofing, ceiling, wall, flooring, cladding solutions, pre-engineered steel buildings and other building materials.

== History ==
Everest Industries Limited was founded in 1934 under the name of Asbestos Cement Ltd. in Maharashtra.

In 1983, the company changed its name to Everest Building Product Ltd., in the same year the company went public on the Bombay Stock Exchange. In 1990 the company was renamed Eternit Everest Ltd. It got its current name in 2003.

In 1995, it also got listed on the National Stock Exchange of India.

In 2010, Everest Industries received the CIDC Vishwakarma Award, In the same year it also received the ICWAI award by Salman Khurshid, Minister of External Affairs (India).

== Operations ==
It employs around 1400 people around the world and reached a combined revenue of INR 1685 crore in 2024. It has three manufacturing plants for pre-engineered steel buildings- Roorkee in Uttarakhand, Ranchi in Jharkhand and Dahej in Gujarat.

== Key People ==
Members of the executive committee are formally appointed by the board of directors. Anant J Talaulicar, is the Chairman
