= Navin's =

Indian real estate development company

- Type: Private
- Industry: Real estate
- Founded: 1989
- Founder: R. Kumar
- Headquarters: Chennai, Tamil Nadu, India
- Area served: Chennai; Bengaluru
- Key people: R. Kumar (Chairman); Navin Kumar (Managing Director)
- Products: Commercial offices Apartments; Plots
- Revenue: ₹50-₹100 crores (as of March 2025)
- Number of employees: 300+ (as of July 2026)
- Website: Official website

Navin's (legally Navin Housing and Properties Private Limited) is an Indian real estate development company headquartered in Chennai, Tamil Nadu. Founded by R. Kumar, a civil engineer at the time, the company develops residential properties and has projects in Chennai and Bengaluru.

== History ==
Navin's traces its origins to 1989 and was founded by R. Kumar. The present corporate entity, Navin Housing and Properties Private Limited, was incorporated in 1991.

By 2013, Navin Housing was developing around 3 million square feet of residential projects worth about ₹1,500 crore in Chennai, with a portfolio of 105 projects, including 94 completed projects. Its projects included Starwood Towers, Hill View Avenue and Goldent Glade.

In 2014, Navin Housing had completed about 100 projects and began planning an expansion beyond Chennai, with plans for more than six million square feet of projects over the following three years. The expansion strategy included newer geographic markets as well as potential commercial developments.

In September 2024, Navin's announced a change in its executive leadership. R. Kumar became chairman, while his son, Viswajith Kumar, also known as Navin Kumar, was appointed managing director.

Following the leadership transition, the company expanded its residential operations beyond Chennai, entering the Bengaluru market in 2024 with Navin's Antheia Poetry.

== Operations ==
Navin's develops residential properties, with its principal market in Chennai and an expanding presence in Bengaluru.

Navin's has participated in construction-industry discussions on building materials. In 2016, N. Kalyanaraman, a technical manager at Navin's Housing at the time, mentioned Navin's decision to use unplasticised polyvinyl chloride (uPVC) in its constructions.

The company had also been involved in discussions about emerging residential markets in the Chennai region. In 2016, G. Seshasayee, chief of business development at Navin's Housing, identified Poonamallee and the NH 4 corridor towards Sriperumbudur as areas with potential for future real estate development, citing planned infrastructure and the proposed Greenfield airport at Sriperumbudur as potential drivers of growth.

In 2025, the company presented properties across Chennai and Bengaluru at the UAE-India Property Show. The company's Chennai portfolio included Hillview Avenue and Starwood Towers, while its Bengaluru projects were located in Dollars Colony and along Bannerghatta Road.

In September 2026, Navin's managing director Vishwajit Kumar participated in a discussion on real estate and sustainability at the CPCL–The Hindu Sustainability Summit in Chennai, addressing the adoption of sustainable building practices and green buildings in the residential sector.

In 2026, the company announced plans to enter plotted residential development as part of the expansion of its residential portfolio.

=== Bengaluru ===
Navin's entered the Bengaluru residential market with Navin's Antheia Poetry, a development in Dollars Colony on Bannerghatta Road. Launched in 2024, the project comprises 42 condominiums in a building with a basement, ground floor and ten upper floors.

== Notable projects ==
=== Antheia Poetry ===
Navin's Antheia Poetry, the company’s first project in the city, is a residential development in Dollars Colony, Bengaluru, on Bannerghatta Road. The project comprises 42 condominiums and was launched in 2024 as Navin's first Bengaluru project.

=== Hanging Gardens ===
Navin's Hanging Gardens is a residential project on Arcot Road in Valasaravakkam, Chennai. The project incorporates vertical green spaces and terraces as part of its design.

Navin's Hanging Gardens received the 17th CIDC Vishwakarma Awards in 2026 in the Best Construction Projects category. The official award list records Navin Housing & Properties Private Limited and Navin's Hanging Gardens as the award recipient and project, respectively.

=== Starwood Towers ===
Navin's Starwood Towers is a residential development in Medavakkam, Chennai. Starwood Towers Phase 3.0 was listed among the awardees of the 15th CIDC Vishwakarma Awards in 2024. The official award list identifies Navin Housing Properties Private Limited and the project among the awardees.

=== Whiteberry ===
Navin's Whiteberry is a residential development in Moolakadai, Chennai. Announced in 2013, the project was planned across 2.41 acres and comprised 224 apartments in two towers in a stilt-plus-12-floor configuration. The project was designed around an H-Block layout intended to provide natural light, ventilation and privacy.

== Community initiatives ==
Navin's has undertaken community-oriented initiatives associated with its residential developments. At Starwood Towers in Medavakkam, Chennai, the company has made a sports park available to residents of the surrounding neighbourhood.

In 2026, Navin's launched Brick by Brick, a homebuying podcast series distributed on ZEE5. The series featured company executives and other participants discussing residential real estate and home buying.

== Awards and recognition ==
List of awards and nominations
Award ceremony	Year	Category	Project	Result	Ref.
CIDC Vishwakarma Awards	2024	Construction Health, Safety & Environment	Navin’s Cedar at Starwood Towers	Won	
CIDC Vishwakarma Awards	2026	Best Construction Projects	Navin’s Hanging Gardens	Won	
ET Realty Awards	2026	Innovative Project - Residential	Navin’s Starwood Towers 3.0	Won	
PMAY Awards	2025	-	Navin’s Starwood Towers 3.0	Won	
Realty+ Excellence Awards	2025	Innovative Marketing Concept of the Year	Navin’s Cedar at Starwood Towers	Won	
