= K. P. Rao =

Indian academic/software developer (born 1940)

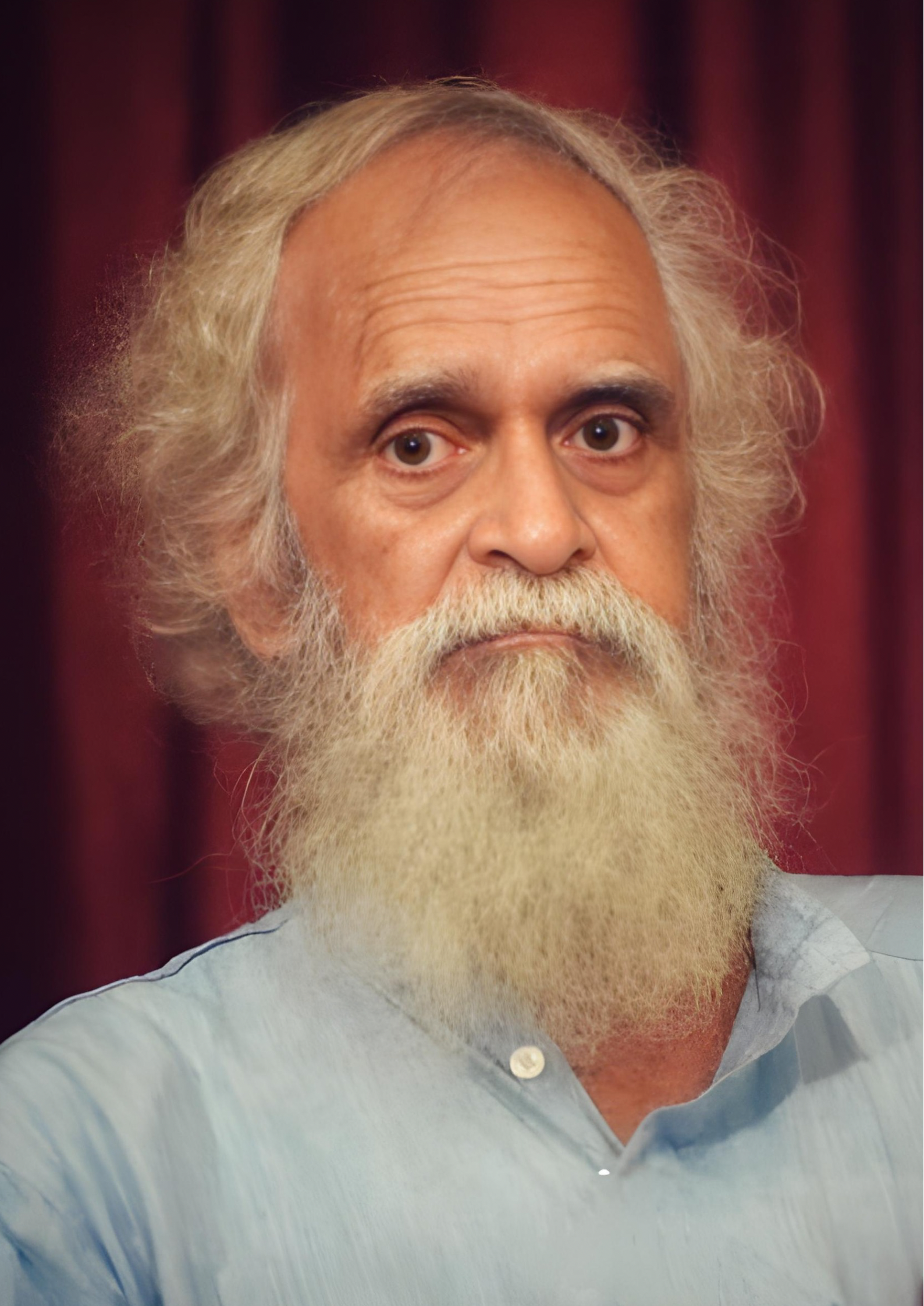
- Rao in 2023
- Born: 29 February 1940 (age 86); Kinnikambala, India
- Occupation: Retired professor
- Employer: Manipal Institute of Technology
- Known for: Kannada computing
- Notable work: Sediyapu, later became popular as KGP Nudi
- Awards: Nudisiri award - 2009; Nadoja (Teacher of State) - 2013; Karnataka Rajyotsava Award - 2013; Eminent Aloysian - 2016; Presidential Print Award by All India Federation of Master Printers - 2021

Kinnikambala Padmanabha Rao (born 29 February 1940) is a retired professor at Manipal Institute of Technology. Commonly known as K. P. Rao, he is credited with the development of the Kannada keyboard and software to use Kannada language on computers, thereby effectively paving the way for the expansion of the use of other Indian languages in software.

== Early life ==
Rao was born in a remote village near Mangalore. From a young age, he was influenced by the diversity of language and culture that was around him, specifically Sufi music, Catholic church services, and the temple bhajans.

Kinnikambla is a multilingual and multi-ethnic village where people coexist despite their religious and cultural differences. The village is inhabited by Hindus, Muslims, and Christians with all their castes and sub-castes. The languages spoken are Hyderabdi-Dakahani Urdu, Bambaiya Hindi, three or four varieties of Konkani, four varieties of Tulu, Kannada, and English. Rao believes that this diversity has enhanced the process of receiving knowledge from any linguistic source rather easy.

In school, he was surrounded by the finest teachers who encouraged learning by doing. Rao had to attend high school and college 20 km away from home and would travel using the public bus service. While at college, he spent a lot of time at the college library and also attended most of the public meetings including Nehru's election campaign speeches and Swami Chinmayananda's Geeta Jnana Yajnas. He also worked part-time as an accounts keeper in motor garages and as a proof reader in printing presses. These experiences have influenced in shaping Rao's career.

Rao completed his Bachelor of Science in chemistry from St. Aloysius College, Mangalore.

== Career and mentorship ==
=== Bhabha Atomic Research Centre ===
Immediately after graduation, Rao proceeded to Bombay and took up small jobs for a few months. He joined the third batch of the Training School of Atomic Energy Establishment, Trombay of the Department of Atomic Energy in August 1959. The Atomic Energy Establishment, Trombay was renamed Bhabha Atomic Research Centre (BARC) after the demise of Dr. Homi Bhabha. While he was trained as a chemist, he enjoyed mathematics, quantum chemistry, electronics, and semiconductors.

It is here that Rao learnt and practiced new methods of learning, using the libraries of TIFR (Institute of Science, Bombay) and AEET's Chemistry Division extensively. During this time, he also came in close association with S. S. Dharmatti, A. K. Ganguly, Raja Ramanna, PR Dastidar and others.

After completion training, Rao took up a job assignment in the electronics division of the BARC. While at BARC, he had the distinction of working alongside scientists like Homi Bhabha and D D Kosambi. Rao was enchanted with Kosambi's ideas of continuous learning. To his day, Rao ensures he completes a course online every two months.

His main work was on semiconductor materials and crystal growing and processing. That was a time when most of the equipment had to be built in-house. Crystal growing systems, zone refining systems, furnaces, compound semiconductors, junction laser devices, thermo-electric systems were all home- made.

During this time, he also worked on rocket and weaponry systems.

=== ECIL and Dharwar ===
In 1968 and as a part of the small team to do so, he moved to Hyderabad from BARC to set up the Electronics Corporation of India. After a short stint, he found the place difficult and went to start a semiconductor activity of his own in Dharwar manufacturing silicon controlled rectifiers. The effort did not succeed and he found limitations in both the fields, technical and commercial. Dharwar exposed Rao to diverse fields of knowledge and enabled him to form a friendship with literature enthusiasts and writers. This was where he met Dr. Shankar Mokashi Punekar and his assistance in writing the book on Indus Valley Seals is mentioned in the Preface of the book

=== Tata Press ===
Rao found refuge in the Tata Press limited, Bombay as a service engineer of electronics equipment and innovative use of electronic printing equipment. Here, he modified the English photo typesetting equipment to photo compose Indian scripts. The first electronically composed book in the Indus script was produced at Tata Press. Tata Press purchased a digital font based typesetting machine from Alpha Type, a Chicago-based electronics company. Rao was deputed to Chicago to learn about the maintenance of this machine. While in Chicago, he travelled to Stanford to commission a machine for Prof. Donald Knuth. He continued to innovate and made possible early scanners for printing, digital types for Indian scripts, pagination programs, photo chemical procedures in printing and many more. One of the first tasks assigned in Tata Press was a solution to the problem of creating a font of Indus Valley Seal Symbols for a typesetting machine.

=== Monotype ===
Rao joined Monotype, a British firm known in the field of printing as the pioneer of mechanized type and automated composition. They also made and sold the first ever laser based typesetter, Laser Comp. Monotype. India had plans to make a table top type setting machine in collaboration with Alpha Type, Chicago. Rao shifted to Bangalore where Monotype India had its manufacturing facility. He visited Chicago, Monotype headquarters at Sussex and Monotype Advanced Development group at Cambridge Industrial park. Discussions with Dr. David Hedgeland followed. Alphatype were not amenable to parting with their digital machines and he hence reluctantly agreed for an 8080-based mechanical setter. The laser comp was adapted to set Indian scripts and the phonetic input system was developed. The first machines to use such an input system were in Telugu in the year 1982.

=== Manipal University ===
After retiring from Monotype at the age of 55, Rao took up teaching. He joined the department of printing technology and taught virtually everything related to printing. All the knowledge acquired in color separation, typesetting, type-design, page and publication design, printing machines design, plant layout. etc. – and all that he had taught himself. He effectively managed migration from print to e-print, with the strength of mathematical tools.

He retired again at age 58 and 60 to go to Delhi and take up an assignment with Quark-Xpress at Chandigarh. He returned to Manipal to teach the post graduate classes in printing.

=== IIT Guwahati ===
Rao was also assigned to IIT Guwahati for a teaching assignment for M.Des. in the Department of Design. He returned to Manipal to teach and retire at the age of 70.

== Printing and typography ==
In the 1980s, K.P Rao provided a keyboard layout to Dr.Srinivasan, Canada, who had developed an editor for DOS to type Kannada. The text was input with the standard English keyboard. The typed text was saved in ASCII.

A small program for converting the text into available Indian script printer specific fonts was written. The editor was dedicated to his grammar teacher, Sediyapu. The Kannada version was popularly known as the Sediyapu Editor and the keyboard layout was known as the KPRao layout which later was accepted by Karnataka Govt. as the official keyboard. The editor was offered free of cost to the public.

The editor was also available for all Paninian Indian scripts.

The ambitious Tulu lexicon project of the Govinda Pai regional resources center at Udupi was to bring out the text in many volumes of print.

Rao authored a Tulu editor to incorporate the additional vowels of Tulu language and created the Kannada fonts for printing as well. The project was successfully completed. Fonts for Baduga, Tulu, Brahmi, Kharoshti, Kadamba etc. were also created.

Apara, a new font with standard English characters and a few modified English characters, was created to help transliterate Indian language words in English-like script.

== Publications ==
Some of Rao's publications include:

- Properties of Elemental Materials, 1968. Tata McGraw Hill.
- Paper Technology and Paper Selection
- Color Theory and Color separation for printers
- A book written in Kannada by T.G. Srinidhi, named "Computarige Kannada Kalisida, KP Rao"
- Serialized Biographical notes being published monthly in Tushara Magazine in Kannada
- A novel written by KP Rao called Varnaka released on 26 September 2021

== Recognition ==
Some of the awards and recognition that K P Rao has received include:

- 2013: The Karnataka Rajyotsava Award for Science and Technology
- 2013: Nadoja (Teacher of the State) award
- 2009: Alva's Nudisiri award
- 2016: Eminent Aloysian
- 2021: Presidential Print Award by All India Federation of Master Printers, New Delhi
- 2021: Balavana Award
