= TASC Outsourcing =

Emirati business service company

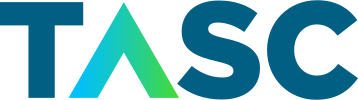

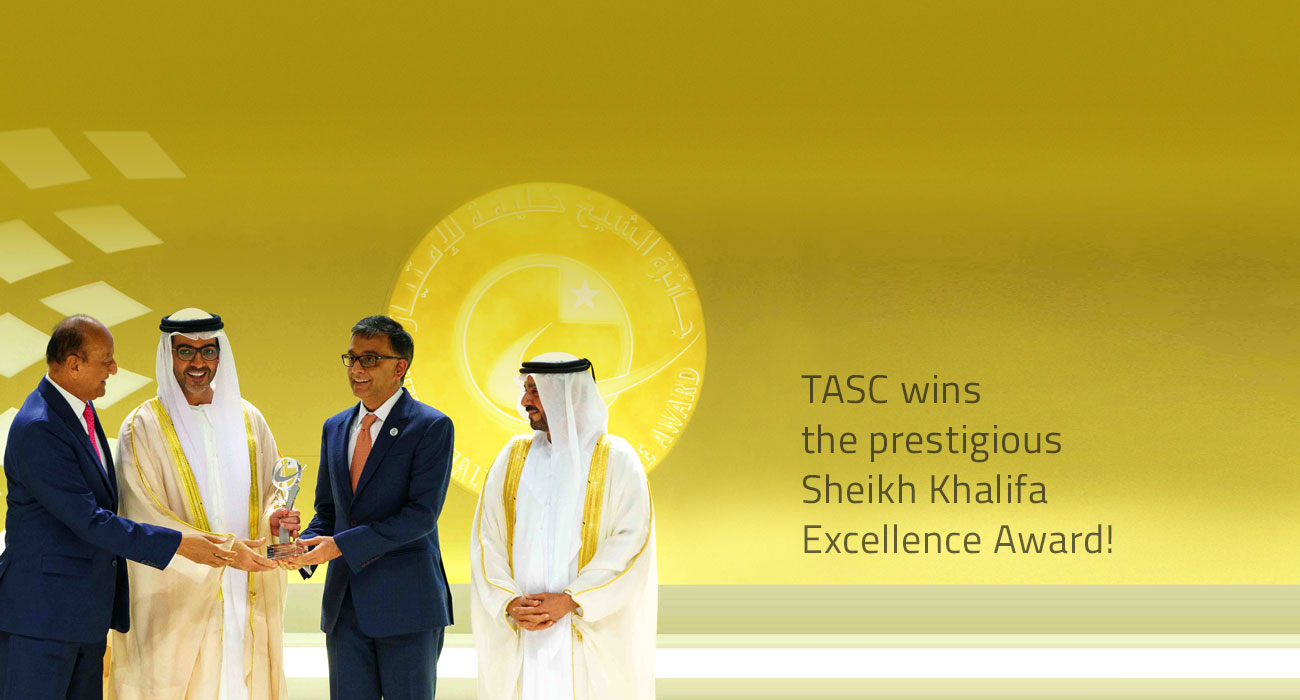
- TASC Outsourcing UAE
- Industry: Professional services
- Founded: 2007
- Founder: Mahesh Shahdadpuri
- Headquarters: Dubai, United Arab Emirates
- Area served: UAE, Lebanon, Kuwait, Bahrain, Qatar, Oman, Saudi Arabia, Egypt, Algeria, Jordan, Israel
- Key people: Mahesh Shahdadpuri (CEO); Richard Jackson (COO)
- Services: Employment agencies, recruitment, human resource consulting and outsourcing
- Number of employees: 7000
- Subsidiaries: Tasc Temp, Top Talent
- Website: www.tascoutsourcing.com

TASC Outsourcing (pronounced: Task) is a staffing and managed services company of the Middle East headquartered in Dubai, United Arab Emirates. TASC Outsourcing was founded in November 2007 by Mahesh Shahdadpuri in Dubai and has its operations, through its branches and network, across the Arab states of the Persian Gulf which includes the UAE, Saudi Arabia, Qatar, Kuwait, Bahrain and Oman. Since 2007, TASC has built teams for over 200 businesses within the GCC, including free zones.

== History ==
TASC Outsourcing started in November 2007 as a small I.T. staffing company, with an initial capital of around $150,000. TASC Outsourcing won its first major client in 2008 and had grown to a company with a contractor base of over 3,000 people by 2015. TASC Outsourcing was named the fastest growing company in the Middle East in 2011 and 2012. TASC Outsourcing was ranked in top 100 SMEs in Dubai SME 100 in 2013. In 2014, LinkedIn named TASC Outsourcing one of the most influential brands in the UAE. In 2015, TASC began using Ramco Systems' enterprise resource planning. TASC is a recipient of the prestigious Sheikh Khalifa Excellence Award in 2016 and in 2018 (Silver Category). TASC became a Superbrand in 2017, and has recently been awarded the prestigious Sheikh Mohammed bin Rashid al Maktoum Business Award in 2019.

== Subsidiaries ==
Tasc Temp is the first online temporary staffing agency in the GCC. Companies are offered temporary staffing for their urgent, ad-hoc and short-term needs. TascTemp.com enables companies to recruit staff online within half-a-day. The temporary staff are pre-screened, interviewed and visa ready. The entire process is fully compliant with UAE labour laws.

Top Talent specializes in oil and gas staffing services in Abu Dhabi, UAE. Top Talent also provides staffing in the field of technology and dotcom.
