= R. K. Baliga =

Indian engineer and chairman (1929–1988)

Ram Krishna Baliga
- Born: 29 December 1929; Mangalore, Madras Presidency, British India
- Died: 26 October 1988 (aged 58); Bangalore, Karnataka, India
- Education: Indian Institute of Science, Bangalore
- Occupations: Founding Chairman and Managing Director of Keonics (1976–1983), Bangalore, India; Chairman and Managing Director, Hindustan Teleprinters Ltd, Chennai, India (1984–1986); Managing Director, Sandur Fluid Controls Pvt Ltd (1986–1988); Visionary, Industrialist, Electronic engineer, Professor of Management and examiner, Bangalore University (1969–1976)
- Known for: Envisioning the Electronic City in Bangalore and other similar cities in Karnataka in 1975
- Spouse: Shanthi Baliga
- Website: https://www.rkbaliga.org/

Ram Krishna Baliga (29 December 1929 – 26 October 1988) was an engineer and chairman. He is regarded as the father of the Electronics City in Bangalore, India, as he founded and established the Electronic City.

== Education and career ==
Ram Krishna Baliga went to Canara High School at Mangalore and completed PUC (Pre University Course) at St. Aloysius College (Mangalore) before he went to College of Engineering, Guindy for B.E. (Elec) Honors. He then completed a master's degree in Power Engineering at Indian Institute of Science as Government of Madras scholar.

While working in the Doctoral Program as Indian Institute of Science Merit scholar he was invited by General Electric to work in their factories in the USA. He worked as Test engineer between 1954 and 1955 at GE. He also worked in Westinghouse Electric Company (1955–1956) and Kaiser Engineers (1956–1959).

He worked as a Project Engineer at National Carbon Company between 1959 and 1960. In 1960 he joined Manipal Institute of Technology as Professor and Vice-Principal.

== Academic role ==
Baliga was the founding Head of Department of Electrical Engineering and Vice Principal in 1960 of Manipal Institute of Technology.

His philosophy was that an engineer in India should not only be up to date in his field but also be well versed in social sciences. He said that in practical terms any engineer must apply his know-how with an eye to the social, economic, geographic, education and natural resources of his/her country.

== Bharat Electronics Limited ==
He was initially Chief Engineer of Bharat Electronics (1961–1968), Works Manager (1968–1973) and subsequently assumed the role of Deputy General Manager of the Radar Division (1973–1976) before he assumed responsibility of chairman and managing director of Karnataka State Electronics Development Corporation(KEONICS) (July 1976-Feb 1984).

As Chief Engineer of Bharat Electronics, he was responsible for developing the integrated residential colony of the company which consisted of the more than 1400 houses including places of worship of different religions. As the President of BEL Co-operative Housing Society between 1974 and 1976 he developed another housing colony of 1500 houses.

== Electronics City ==
According to the Indian Express, in the early 1970s Baliga envisioned making Bangalore the "Silicon Valley of India" and it was met with skepticism. However, the then Chief Minister D. Devaraj Urs of Karnataka decided to support him and made him the Chairman of the Karnataka State Electronics Development Corporation (Keonics) in 1976. In 1978 Keonics established Electronics City on 332 acres (1.34 km^{2}) in Konappana Agrahara and Doddathogur Village, near Bangalore. He completed his term as Chairman of Keonics in 1983 during which period he saw the establishment of several firms. The development of the Electronic City gained substantial momentum after India liberalized its economy in early 1990s. According to the Keonics website, Electronics City today houses over 100 information technology and electronics companies who employ over 60,000 personnel.

== Hindustan Teleprinters Limited ==
As Chairman & Managing Director of Hindustan Teleprinters Ltd (1984–1986) he successfully introduced Electronic Teleprinters in India replacing the old outdated model of Electro-Mechanical Teleprinters of 1961 vintage.

== Volunteer works ==
In 1955 he was the President of the International Club at Westing House Electric Corporation, which consisted of members of several nationalities with view of promoting international goodwill among them and US citizens.

He was also president of the Indian Institute of Plant Engineers which has 4000 members according to the Deccan Herald, president of International Club at Westinghouse Electric Corporation (USA), president of Karnataka Productivity Council and President of Rotary Club of Bangalore where he initiated the Burns Ward.
