= Annapoorna Kini =

American medical academic

- Born: India
- Education: Kasturba Medical College, Mangalore
- Occupations: Zena and Michael A Wiener Professor of Medicine, Director of the Cardiac Catheterization Laboratory
- Known for: Coronary interventions, Annapoorna S. Kini Fellows' Choice Award
- Medical career
- Profession: Physician
- Field: Physician, surgeon, researcher
- Institutions: The Mount Sinai Health System
- Research: Coronary disease

Annapoorna Kini is an American cardiologist. She is Professor of Cardiology and Interventional Director of Structural Heart Program at Mount Sinai School of Medicine in New York City.

== Education ==
Kini completed her pre-university education from Vivekananda College, Puttur (D.K. District, Karnataka) in 1984. She received her MBBS from the Kasturba Medical College, Mangalore in 1991, completing residencies at the University of Wales College of Medicine (in 1996). After receiving training in England, she became a member of the Royal College of Physicians of London. She completed three fellowships at Mount Sinai Medical Center – in 1997, 2001, and 2002, respectively.

== Career ==
Kini serves as a professor of medicine, Director of Cardiac Catheterization Laboratory, Director of Interventional Structural Heart Disease Program, and Director of Interventional Cardiology Fellowship at The Mount Sinai Medical Center, where she was named Zena and Michael A. Wiener Medicine Professor in 2016. She researches on the field of percutaneous coronary intervention and heart valve therapy.

Kini co-established, with Samin Sharma the Live Symposium of Complex Coronary and Vascular Cases in 1998 and has served as Director of the Annual Live Symposium of Complex Coronary & Vascular Cases at The Mount Sinai Medical Center.

=== Awards ===
Kini was awarded the 2011 Dean's Award for Excellence in Clinical Medicine by The Mount Sinai Health System. In 2017 she was given the Ellis Island Medal of Honor to congratulate her on achievements as an Indian immigrant in the US. She was the 2018 recipient of the Heart of Gold award from the American Heart Association and in 2019 Kini was honored by the New York chapter of the Association of Indians in America for her successful career in cardiology.

== Publications ==
Kini has co-written and had published more than 100 peer-reviewed scientific publications, as well as book chapters in cardiology textbooks.

=== Books ===
She is co-author of Atlas of Coronary Intravascular Optical Coherence Tomography, ISBN 3-319-62664-7, Practical Manual of Interventional Cardiology, ISBN 1-447-16580-2, Percutaneous Interventions in Women, An Issue of Interventional Cardiology Clinics, ISBN 1-455-73882-4, Advanced Applied Interventional Cardiology, An Issue of Cardiology Clinics, ISBN 1-437-71800-0, Cardiovascular Intensive Care, An Issue of Cardiology Clinics, ISBN 0-323-24217-0, Coronary artherectomy: Contemporary concepts in cardiology and (with Dr. Valentín Fuster) of Definitions of acute coronary syndromes in Hurst's The Heart.

=== Mobile applications ===
Kini designed and implemented a mobile app for treatment of patients with a ST-segment elevation myocardial infarction, STEMI, medical emergency requiring immediate attention and treatment, STEMIcathAID. The app optimizes provides a communication platform for multiple teams taking care of a STEMI patients in order to reduce treatment delays and improve patient outcomes. In addition, she created a suite of educational mobile and web applications covering different aspects of interventional cardiology such as bifurcation intervention, treatment of calcified lesion, optical coherence tomography imaging, coronary angiography and PCI in patients after TAVR, management of procedural complications and selection of appropriate coronary guidewires.

=== Peer-reviewed articles ===
Partial list:

- Ro, Richard; Tang, Gilbert H.L.; Khera, Sahil; Krishnamoorthy, Parasuram; Sharma, Samin K.; Kini, Annapoorna; Lerakis, Stamatios (April 2020). "Murphy's Law or Domino Effect". Circulation: Cardiovascular Imaging. 13 (4) e010162. doi:10.1161/CIRCIMAGING.119.010162. PMID 32208736.
- Yamamoto, Myong Hwa; Maehara, Akiko; Stone, Gregg W.; Kini, Annapoorna S.; Brilakis, Emmanouil S.; Rizik, David G.; Shunk, Kendrick; Powers, Eric R.; Tobis, Jonathan M.; Maini, Brijeshwar S.; Dixon, Simon R.; Goldstein, James A.; Petersen, John L.; Généreux, Philippe; Shah, Priti R.; Crowley, Aaron; Nicholls, Stephen J.; Mintz, Gary S.; Muller, James E.; Weisz, Giora (March 2020). "2-Year Outcomes After Stenting of Lipid-Rich and Nonrich Coronary Plaques". Journal of the American College of Cardiology. 75 (12): 1371–1382. doi:10.1016/j.jacc.2020.01.044. PMID 32216905.
- Tang, Gilbert H.L.; Ro, Richard J.; Sengupta, Aditya; Khera, Sahil; Sharma, Samin K.; Kini, Annapoorna; Lerakis, Stamatios (March 2020). "A Novel Method to Quantify Leaflet Insertion During Transcatheter Mitral Valve Repair With the MitraClip". JACC: Cardiovascular Interventions. 13 (12): 1499–1500. doi:10.1016/j.jcin.2020.01.199. PMID 32222438.
- Kini, Ashwini T.; Tabba, Subhan; Mitchell, Travis; Al Othman, Bayan; Li, Helen; Lee, Andrew G. (March 2020). "Simultaneous Bilateral Serous Retinal Detachments and Cortical Visual Loss in the PRES HELLP Syndrome". Journal of Neuro-Ophthalmology. 41 (1): e60–e63. doi:10.1097/WNO.0000000000000942. PMID 32235215. S2CID 214771129.
- Krishnan, Prakash; Tarricone, Arthur; Purushottam, Bhaskar; Chen, Simon; Kapur, Vishal; Gujja, Karthik; Kini, Annapoorna; Sharma, Samin (9 April 2020). "Gender Differences in the Outcomes of Drug-Coated Balloon Treatment in Symptomatic Femoropopliteal Arterial Disease". Vascular and Endovascular Surgery. 54 (4): 348–354. doi:10.1177/1538574420911508. PMID 32270758. S2CID 215612603.
- Dermarkarian, Christopher R.; Kini, Ashwini T.; Al Othman, Bayan A.; Lee, Andrew G. (April 2020). "Neuro-Ophthalmic Manifestations of Intracranial Malignancies". Journal of Neuro-Ophthalmology. 40 (3): e31–e48. doi:10.1097/WNO.0000000000000950. PMID 32282510.
- Wang, Rui; Al Othman, Bayan; Kini, Ashwini; Lee, Andrew G. (5 March 2020). "Dilated orbital vein causing Valsalva-induced proptosis". Baylor University Medical Center Proceedings. 33 (2): 281–282. doi:10.1080/08998280.2020.1727708. PMC 7155982. PMID 32313489.
- Azzalini, Lorenzo; Johal, Gurpreet S.; Baber, Usman; Bander, Jeffrey; Moreno, Pedro R.; Bazi, Lucas; Kapur, Vishal; Barman, Nitin; Kini, Annapoorna S.; Sharma, Samin K. (25 April 2020). "Outcomes of Impella-supported high-risk nonemergent percutaneous coronary intervention in a large single-center registry". Catheterization and Cardiovascular Interventions. 97 (1): E26–E33. doi:10.1002/ccd.28931. PMID 32333721. S2CID 216131008.
- Kamal, Sarah; Al Othman, Bayan; Kini, Ashwini; Beaver, Hilary A.; Chaudhry, Imtiaz; Prospero Ponce, Claudia M.; Chévez-Barrios, Patricia; Lee, Andrew G. (May 2020). "Infectious keratitis as the presenting sign of giant cell arteritis". Canadian Journal of Ophthalmology. 55 (5): e182–e185. doi:10.1016/j.jcjo.2020.02.003. PMID 32386787.
- Tang, Gilbert H.L.; Zaid, Syed; Fuchs, Andreas; Yamabe, Tsuyoshi; Yazdchi, Farhang; Gupta, Eisha; Ahmad, Hasan; Kofoed, Klaus F.; Goldberg, Joshua B.; Undemir, Cenap; Kaple, Ryan K.; Shah, Pinak B.; Kaneko, Tsuyoshi; Lansman, Steven L.; Khera, Sahil; Kovacic, Jason C.; Dangas, George D.; Lerakis, Stamatios; Sharma, Samin K.; Kini, Annapoorna; Adams, David H.; Khalique, Omar K.; Hahn, Rebecca T.; Søndergaard, Lars; George, Isaac; Kodali, Susheel K.; De Backer, Ole; Leon, Martin B.; Bapat, Vinayak N. (May 2020). "Alignment of Transcatheter Aortic-Valve Neo-Commissures (ALIGN TAVR)". JACC: Cardiovascular Interventions. 13 (9): 1030–1042. doi:10.1016/j.jcin.2020.02.005. PMID 32192985.
- Kini, Annapoorna S.; Mitre, Cristina A.; Kim, Michael; Kamran, Mazullah; Reich, David; Sharma, Samin K. (February 2002). "A protocol for prevention of radiographic contrast nephropathy during percutaneous coronary intervention: Effect of selective dopamine receptor agonist fenoldopam". Catheterization and Cardiovascular Interventions. 55 (2): 169–173. doi:10.1002/ccd.10038. PMID 11835641. S2CID 22136818.
