= Anant J Talaulicar =

Indian businessman

Anant Talaulicar
- Education: Manipal Institute of Technology; University of Michigan; Tulane University

Anant J. Talaulicar is an Indian businessman who was Chairman & Managing Director of Cummins India from 2004 until 2017. Talaulicar worked full-time for Cummins beginning in 1988 and held a number of positions in the company, both in the United States and India. In November 2017, Talaulicar left Cummins India.

== Early life and education ==
Talaulicar earned a bachelor's degree in mechanical engineering in 1984 (NSS batch) from Manipal Institute of Technology in India. He then moved to US for further education. He received a master's degree in engineering from the University of Michigan in 1985 and an MBA from Tulane University in 1987. Talaulicar is the son of J E Talaulicar who served the Tatas for the better part of four decades - eventually as managing director of Telco (now Tata Motors).

== Career ==
Talaulicar started his career with Cummins in the year 1986 as a college intern. He held a number of positions both in the United States and in India. He served as a financial analyst and held manufacturing engineering and product management positions in the Engine Business Unit. He moved to corporate strategy later in Cummins. In 1996, Talaulicar transitioned to the Cummins Power Generation business and during his tenure has been the General Manager of the Transfer Switch Business followed by the Consumer Business and finally the Commercial Generator Businesses for the Americas.

In the year 2004, Talaulicar moved to India. He began by leading Cummins diesel sales & services (CDS&S) and power generation businesses for a year. Subsequently, he took over as MD of Cummins India this March. Later he became Chairman & Managing Director - Cummins India Ltd. Cummins India has seen a double digit growth in his leadership. He has also led the Cummins India Foundation which has implemented sustainable community initiatives such as rural electrification and improving access to water. He serves as a member of the Confederation of Indian Industries, Society of Indian Automobile Manufacturers and Automobile Components Manufacturers Association.

Cummins India Ltd has informed BSE that it has approved the terms of re-appointment including remuneration of Mr. Anant J. Talaulicar as managing director of the company for a period of 5 years w.e.f. 25 April 2013

Talaulicar resigned from Cummins on 8 November 2017 He is no longer affiliated with the company.

=== Career path by positions ===
1. Financial Analyst in the Midrange engine group in 1988.
2. Engineering and product management positions in the engine business
3. Corporate strategy position in the engine business
4. Joining the Cummins Power Generation business in 1996.
5. Vice President of Cummins India Ltd. since 1 September 2005.
6. Vice President of Cummins Inc. since September 2005.
7. Joint Managing Director of Cummins India Ltd. in 2003 with responsibilities for the Power Generation and Distribution Businesses in India.
8. Chairman of the Board of Valvoline Cummins Limited.
9. Chairman of Cummins Diesel Sales & Service (I) Ltd.
10. Non Executive Director of Cummins India Limited.
11. Independent Non Executive Director of KPIT Technologies Limited (formerly KPIT Cummins Infosystems Ltd.)
12. Independent Non-Executive Director at Bosch Chassis Systems India Ltd. since 15 May 2006.
13. Lead the Cummins India Foundation community development activities and serves as Member of the Confederation of Indian Industries, Society of Indian Automobile Manufacturers and Automobile Components Manufacturers Association.
14. President, Components Group - Cummins (Jan. 2010 to Dec. 2014)
15. Vice President India Operations - Jan 2015– Nov 2017
16. Vice President & Managing Director – Cummins India ABO (March 2004 to Nov 2017)
17. Chairman & Managing Director - Cummins India Limited (since 1 March 2004-Nov 2017)
18. Independent Director - Birlasoft Limited from 21 Oct 2017 to 20 Oct 2022
19. Managing Director – Tata Cummins Ltd.
20. Chairman – Cummins Technologies India Limited
21. Chairman – Cummins Research & Technology India
22. Chairman - Everest Industries Ltd
