= Coronary =

Coronary (from Latin Corona 'Crown') may, as shorthand in English, be used to mean:

- Coronary circulation, the system of arteries and veins in mammals
  - Coronary artery disease
  - Coronary occlusion
  - A myocardial infarction, a heart attack

== As adjective ==
- Referring to the work of a Coroner, a person entitled to investigate deaths
- Referring to a stellar corona, the outermost atmosphere of a star
- Mistakenly to a Cornea, part of a mammalian eye.
