= Kasturba Medical College =

Medical college in Karnataka, India

- Motto: Inspired by Life
- Type: Private
- Established: 30 June 1953; 73 years ago (KMC Manipal); 1955; 71 years ago (KMC Mangaluru)
- Academic affiliations: Manipal Academy of Higher Education
- Dean: Dr. Anil K. Bhat (Manipal); Dr. B. Unnikrishnan (Mangaluru)
- Academic staff: 800+
- Students: 1000+
- Location: Karnataka, India
- Colours: Orange Black

Kasturba Medical College, Manipal and Kasturba Medical College, Mangaluru, together known as KMC, are two private medical colleges in the state of Karnataka, India, established in 1953 and 1955. The colleges are constituent units of Manipal Academy of Higher Education, an Institution of Eminence and deemed university.

== History ==
=== Early years ===
The colleges were established as a single institution in 1953 by T M A Pai with the pre-clinical section at Manipal and the clinical section in Mangalore at Wenlock District Hospital. Manipal and Mangalore were then a part of the erstwhile Madras state. The government of Madras granted land to establish a college and permitted the use of government hospitals for training medical students. The first batch of students arrived in Mangalore in 1955 for their clinical training. In 1956, the colleges became part of the expanded Mysore state which was then renamed as Karnataka.

=== Separation ===
The clinical program commenced at Manipal in 1969 with the setting up of Kasturba Hospital. The colleges were later separated with the establishment of a pre-clinical section in Mangalore. Kasturba Medical College, Mangalore is attached to three government hospitals and was the first medical institution in India to be established as a public-private partnership.

=== Affiliation with public universities ===
From their establishment in 1953, until 1993, the colleges were affiliated with public universities in Karnataka. The colleges were affiliated to Karnatak University from their establishment until 1964. They were affiliated to Mysore University from 1965 to 1980 and to Mangalore University from 1981 to 1992.

=== Deemed University ===
In 1993, KMC Manipal and KMC Mangalore, along with colleges of dental surgery in Manipal and Mangalore were given deemed university status to form the Manipal Academy of Higher Education. In 2017, KMC Mangalore agreed to build a super specialty hospital at District Wenlock Hospital and extended its public private partnership with the government of Karnataka for another 33 years, i.e., until 2050.

== Campuses ==
=== Manipal ===
KMC Manipal is located in the university town of Manipal, a suburb in Udupi, Karnataka. It is situated within the campus of Manipal Academy of Higher Education. The campus at Manipal has a large Health Sciences Library and a Museum of Anatomy and Pathology.

=== Mangaluru ===
KMC Mangaluru is located in Mangaluru. The campus at Mangaluru is split into the Centre for Basic Sciences at Bejai and the main campus at Light House Hill Road. The campus includes six teaching hospitals, the T M A Pai Convention Centre and a large indoor sports complex.

=== Connectivity ===
The colleges are 60 km (37 mi) apart.

== Academics ==
=== Courses ===
Bachelor of Medicine and Bachelor of Surgery (MBBS) is the basic undergraduate medical degree awarded by the Manipal Academy of Higher Education at both the colleges after nine semesters of coursework and one year of internship. Postgraduate Doctor of Medicine (MD) and Master of Surgery (MS) are awarded after three years of residential training. Integrated MD–PhD and PhD Programs to train physician-scientists to take up a research career. Postdoctoral Doctorate of Medicine (DM) and Master of Chirurgiae (MCh) degrees are awarded after three years of postdoctoral super specialty training as a senior resident.

Degree	Specialties
Doctor of Medicine (MD)	Anatomy, Anesthesiology, Biochemistry, Dermatology, Emergency Medicine, Forensic Medicine, General Medicine, Hospital Administration, Immunohematology, Microbiology, Pathology, Palliative Care, Pediatrics, Pharmacology, Physiology, Psychiatry, Respiratory Medicine, Radiodiagnosis and Radiotherapy
Master of Surgery (MS)	General Surgery, Obstetrics and Gynecology, Ophthalmology, Orthopedics and Otorhinolaryngology
Doctorate of Medicine (DM)	Cardiology, Gastroenterology, Infectious diseases, Oncology, Nephrology and Neurology
Master of Chirurgiae (MCh)	Cardiothoracic surgery, Pediatric surgery, Plastic surgery, Neurosurgery and Urology
Fellowships	Interventional radiology, Neuromodulation, Advanced obstetric ultrasound, Diabetes, Fetal Medicine, Geriatric Medicine, Microsurgery, Gynecologic oncology, Head and neck oncology, Neonatology, Neuro-anesthesia, Pediatric anesthesia, Onco-surgery, Onco-pathology and Reproductive medicine

=== Rankings ===
- KMC Manipal and KMC Mangalore were ranked 9th and 33rd respectively among the medical colleges of India in the NIRF 2024 Rankings.
- Manipal Academy of Higher Education was ranked 4th among universities in India in the NIRF 2024 Rankings.
- Manipal Academy of Higher Education was ranked in the 251-300 rank bracket in Medicine in the QS World University Rankings 2025, the second in India after AIIMS, New Delhi.

=== Admission ===
KMC Manipal and KMC Mangalore admit 250 students each for the undergraduate MBBS course. Admission is based on the 'All India Rank' obtained in NEET (UG) conducted by NTA. 20% of the MBBS seats in KMC Mangalore are retained for candidates from Karnataka as part of the public private partnership. Admissions to postgraduate and super specialty courses are based on the rank obtained in NEET (PG) and NEET (SS) respectively. Admissions to nursing, physiotherapy, psychology and other allied health courses are based on the score obtained in the Manipal Entrance Test.

=== Examinations ===
The examinations at KMC Manipal and KMC Mangalore are conducted by the Manipal Academy of Higher Education according to guidelines laid down by the National Medical Commission. All exams are paperless and are written on a biometric secured tablet using a stylus.

== Teaching hospitals ==
=== KMC Manipal ===
- Kasturba Hospital, Manipal
- Dr. TMA Pai Hospital, Udupi

=== KMC Mangalore ===
Unlike most medical colleges in India, KMC Mangalore is attached to both government and private hospitals.

- Wenlock District Hospital
- Lady Goschen Hospital
- KMC Hospital, Attavar
- KMC Hospital, Ambedkar Circle
- Regional Advanced Pediatric Care Centre
- Dr. TMA Pai Rotary Hospital, Karkala

== Manipal Hospitals ==
Manipal Hospitals is a chain of multi-specialty hospitals in India. The hospitals trace their origins to the Kasturba Medical College. It is the second largest healthcare provider in India. Its network spread across 28 locations in India. The first hospital of the chain was established in 1991 in Bengaluru. In 1997, the second hospital of the chain was established as KMC Hospital (Ambedkar Circle), a 251-bed tertiary care hospital and also a teaching hospital of the Kasturba Medical College, Mangalore.

Manipal Hospitals uses IBM Watson for Oncology since 2016. Watson is the first commercially available cognitive computing cloud platform that analyzes high volumes of data understands complex queries and proposes evidence based answers for them. Manipal Hospitals have become the first in the country and the second in the world to implement IBM Watson for diagnosis and treatment of cancer.

In April 2019 Manipal Hospitals was looking forward to acquire Medanta Hospitals. The deal however fell through since the two parties could not agree on the share price.

In 2021, Manipal Hospitals acquired Columbia Asia's India hospital chain for Rs 2,100 crore.

== Notable people ==
List of notable people associated with Kasturba Medical College
Name	Notability
Raghu Ram Pillarisetti	Breast Cancer Surgeon. Recipient of Dr. B. C. Roy Award, Padma Shri, Officer of the Most Excellent Order of the British Empire
Devi Shetty	Cardiac Surgeon and founder of Narayana Health.
Ramdas Pai	Doctor and Chancellor of Manipal Academy of Higher Education.
Kamala Selvaraj	Obstetrician and Gynecologist who pioneered the first IVF in South India.
C N Ashwatnarayan	Deputy chief minister of Karnataka.
B M Hegde	Cardiologist and recipient of Padma Vibhushan and Padma Bhushan.
Sheikh Muszaphar Shukor	Astronaut and orthopedic surgeon.
Annapoorna Kini	Cardiologist and assistant director at Mount Sinai School of Medicine, New York.
H S Ballal	Radiologist and Pro Chancellor of Manipal Academy of Higher Education.
H Sudarshan Ballal	Nephrologist and chairman of Manipal Hospitals.
