= CIDC Vishwakarma Awards =

Indian construction industry awards

- Description: Awards recognising contributions to the Indian construction industry
- Country: India
- Presented by: Construction Industry Development Council
- First award: 2009
- Website: Official website

The CIDC Vishwakarma Awards are annual awards presented by the Construction Industry Development Council (CIDC) to individuals and organisations for contributions to the Indian construction industry. The awards recognise achievements across areas including construction projects, professionally managed companies, artisans and supervisors, academic and technical contributions, social development and public service.The inaugural awards, recognising achievements in 2008, were presented on 7 March 2009 at the India Habitat Centre in New Delhi. The awards have subsequently been held annually, with the official CIDC archive listing editions from the 1st CIDC Vishwakarma Awards in 2009 through the 18th CIDC Vishwakarma Awards in 2026.

== History ==
The inaugural CIDC Vishwakarma Awards, recognising achievements in 2008, were presented on 7 March 2009 at the India Habitat Centre in New Delhi. The awards recognised individuals and organisations across several areas of the construction industry, including companies, artisans and supervisors, and academic achievement.

In 2010, the second edition of the awards was held in New Delhi. The recipients included individuals and organisations from the construction and infrastructure sectors.

The awards continued to recognise infrastructure projects in subsequent years. In 2014, the Airports Authority of India received a Best Construction Project award for the integrated passenger terminal at Netaji Subhas Chandra Bose International Airport in Kolkata. In 2016, the newly constructed terminal building at Chandigarh International Airport was recognised in the same category. The official award list also included projects such as the Dagachuu Hydel Power Project in Bhutan and the rail-cum-road bridge across the Ganges at Patna.

The 11th awards were presented on 7 March 2019. Recipients included organisations involved in construction and infrastructure, among them IRCON International, SJVN, Indian Oil Corporation and Tata Projects, as well as individual professionals and academics.

The 15th awards were held in 2024. SJVN received awards for social development and impact and the CIDC Partners in Progress Trophy, while the Lucknow Metro project was recognised in the Best Construction Project category.

In 2026, projects from Odisha featured prominently in the 17th edition. Around 1,550 applications had been received for the awards, and 15 projects from the state were shortlisted for recognition.

== Categories ==
The awards have recognised construction projects, companies, individual professionals, public officials, artisans, supervisors and contributions to construction education and social development.

Categories have included awards for professionally managed companies, construction projects, construction education, and the maintenance, retrofitting and rehabilitation of structures. Other awards have recognised contributions to social development and impact, as well as individuals in public service, academia, science and technology.

The Best Construction Project category has covered infrastructure developments in areas such as roads, bridges, railways, power, airports, ports and urban infrastructure.

== Selection process ==
The awards use category-specific criteria to assess individual nominees and construction projects. The published selection procedure has included scrutiny of nominations by a jury, with interviews and site visits used for certain categories.

== Award ceremonies ==
The inaugural ceremony was held on 7 March 2009 at the India Habitat Centre in New Delhi. The second ceremony was held on 7 March 2010 in New Delhi. CIDC's published material states that the awards were associated with 7 March, the foundation day of the Construction Industry Development Council. The ceremonies have included recognition of both individuals and organisations. Early editions included awards for artisans and construction workers alongside awards for companies, public officials and academic professionals.

== Notable recipients and projects ==
The awards have recognised projects and organisations across different sectors of the Indian construction and infrastructure industry.

- The Airports Authority of India received a 2014 award for the new integrated passenger terminal building at Kolkata airport in the Best Construction Project category.
- The integrated terminal building of Chandigarh International Airport received the Best Construction Project award in 2016.
- The 2016 award list included the Patna rail-cum-road bridge across the Ganges, the Dagachuu Hydel Power Project in Bhutan and the New International Airport at Chandigarh among the recognised construction projects.
- SJVN Limited received two awards at the 13th CIDC Vishwakarma Awards in 2022 and two awards at the 15th CIDC Vishwakarma Awards in 2024, including an Achievement Award for Creating Social Development and Impact and the CIDC Partners in Progress Trophy.
- The Lucknow Metro project received the Best Construction Project award at the 15th CIDC Vishwakarma Awards in 2024.

== Editions ==
Edition	Year	Venue	Awardees
1st	2009	India Habitat Centre	List of awardees
2nd	2010	India Habitat Centre	List of awardees
3rd	2011	India Habitat Centre	List of awardees
4th	2012	India Habitat Centre	List of awardees
5th	2013	India Habitat Centre	List of awardees
6th	2014	India Habitat Centre	List of awardees
7th	2015	India Habitat Centre	List of awardees
8th	2016	India Habitat Centre	List of awardees
9th	2017	India Habitat Centre	List of awardees
10th	2018	India Habitat Centre	List of awardees
11th	2019	India Habitat Centre	List of awardees
12th	2021	India Habitat Centre	List of awardees
13th	2022	India Habitat Centre	List of awardees
14th	2023	New Delhi	List of awardees
15th	2024	India Habitat Centre	List of awardees
16th	2025	Dr. Ambedkar International Centre	List of awardees
17th	2026	Dr. Ambedkar International Centre	List of awardees
18th	2026	New Delhi	Pending

The official CIDC archive lists the 12th edition as 2021 and the 13th edition as 2022, following the gap after the 11th edition in 2019. It currently lists both the 17th and 18th editions under 2026.
