= Manipal Institute of Technology =

Engineering college in Karnataka, India

Coordinates: 13.35129°N 74.79271°E

- 60th-anniversary logo of the institute
- Motto: Knowledge is Power
- Type: Private
- Established: 11 May 1957; 69 years ago
- Founder: T. M. A. Pai
- Parent institution: Manipal Academy of Higher Education
- Director: Dr Anil Rana
- Faculty: 600+
- Students: 8000+ undergraduate students 1000+ postgraduate and doctoral students
- Location: Manipal, Karnataka, India
- Campus: 313 acres (1.27 km^{2}), University town
- Colors: White and orange
- Website: manipal.edu/mit

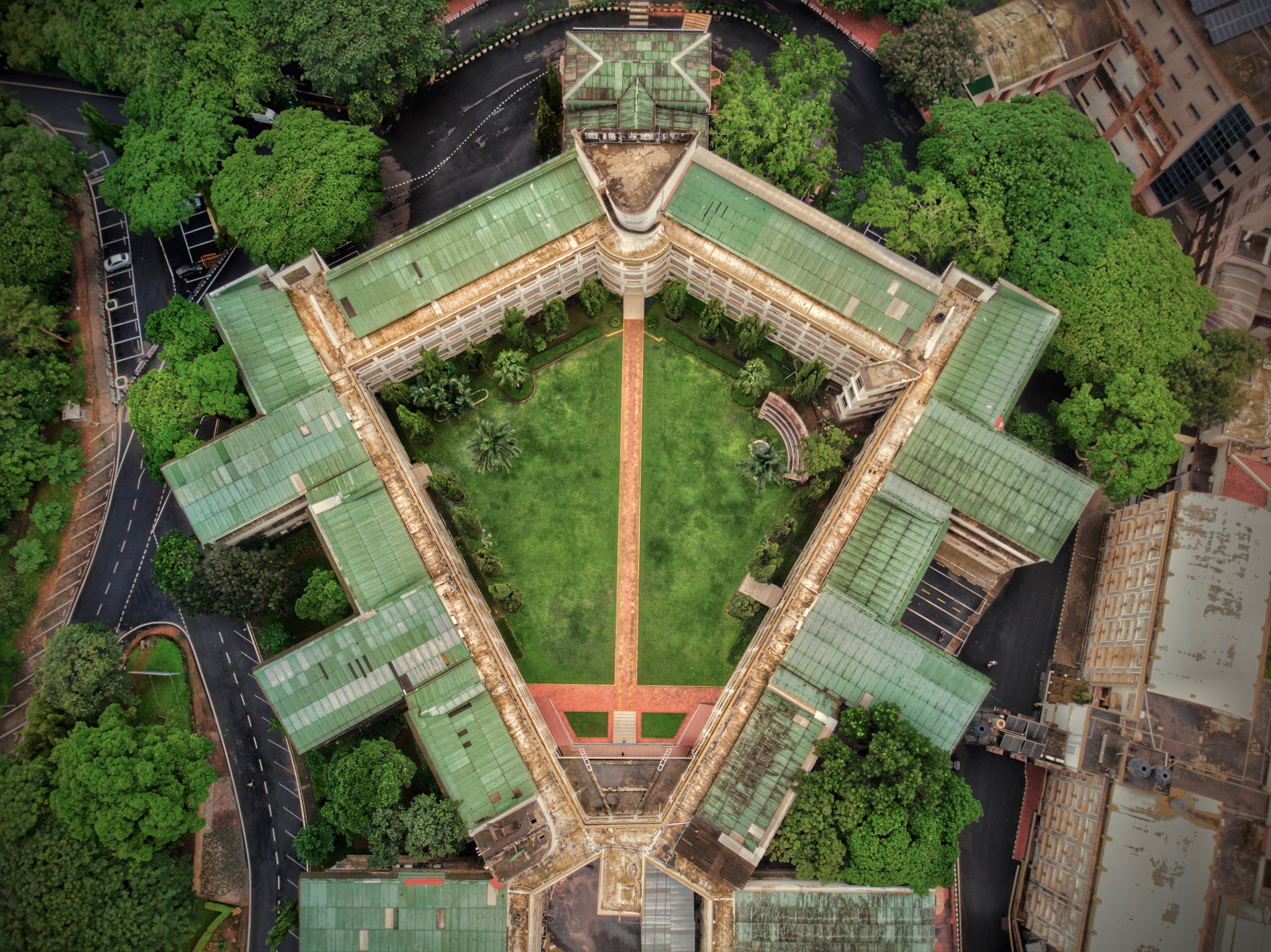
Academic Block 1

Manipal Institute of Technology (MIT) is a private engineering college and constituent institution of the Manipal Academy of Higher Education (MAHE) located in Manipal, Karnataka, India.

Established in 1957 as Manipal Engineering College (MEC), the institute offers undergraduate, postgraduate, and doctoral programmes in engineering, technology, and applied sciences. MIT has 18 academic departments and conducts research programmes supported by agencies including the Department of Science and Technology (DST), Council of Scientific and Industrial Research (CSIR), and the All India Council for Technical Education (AICTE).

In 2018, the Government of India granted MAHE the status of Institute of Eminence.

== History ==
=== Foundation and early years ===
Manipal Engineering College (MEC) was inaugurated on 11 May 1957 by the then Chief Minister of Mysore, S. Nijalingappa.

Initially, lectures were conducted at the Kasturba Medical College, Manipal campus before the present campus facilities were completed later in 1957. The institute began with 120 students and 25 faculty members.

Civil engineering was the first discipline offered at the institute, followed by undergraduate programmes in mechanical engineering and electrical engineering by 1961.

The institute was initially affiliated with Karnatak University and later became affiliated with the University of Mysore in 1965.

=== Expansion and university integration ===
In 1969, the institute introduced Chemical engineering and later expanded to include Electronics and Communication Engineering, Instrumentation and Control Engineering, Mechatronics, Aeronautical Engineering, and Automobile Engineering.

In 1974, the institution adopted its current name, Manipal Institute of Technology. In 1980, the institute came under the jurisdiction of Mangalore University.

In 1993, Manipal Academy of Higher Education was granted deemed university status by the University Grants Commission, and MIT became a constituent institution of the university.

The institute has been visited by public figures including the Dalai Lama, Indira Gandhi, A. P. J. Abdul Kalam, Pratibha Patil, and Pranab Mukherjee.

== Campus ==
MIT is located in Manipal, approximately 65 km north of Mangalore. The campus includes academic buildings, laboratories, libraries, student residences, sports facilities, and research centres.

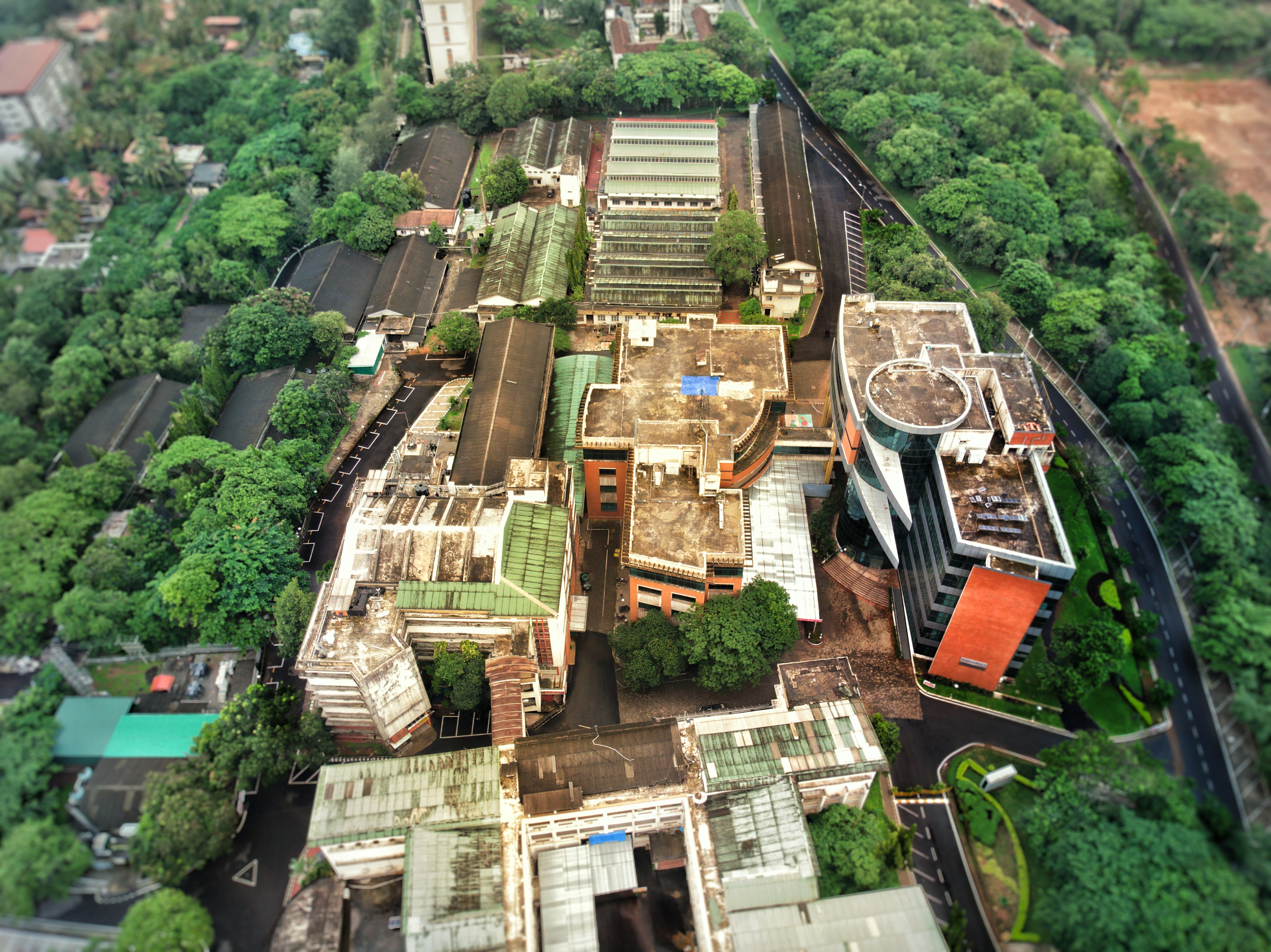
MIT Manipal campus

The campus also contains student recreational areas including the Student Plaza.

== Academics ==
=== Academic programmes ===
MIT follows a credit-based academic system. Undergraduate programmes lead to Bachelor's degree qualifications in multiple engineering disciplines. The institute also offers postgraduate and doctoral programmes, including Master of Technology, Master of Science, Master of Computer Applications, and doctoral degrees.

MAHE is accredited by the National Assessment and Accreditation Council (NAAC).

=== Rankings ===
University and College rankings

Engineering – India
- NIRF (2024): 56

Manipal Institute of Technology was ranked 56th among engineering colleges in India by the National Institutional Ranking Framework (NIRF) in 2024.

The institute was also ranked among private engineering colleges in India by publications including India Today and Outlook India.

=== Admissions ===
Admission to undergraduate programmes is primarily through the Manipal Entrance Test (MET), a computer-based entrance examination conducted by MAHE.

== Research ==
MIT conducts research in areas including nanotechnology, nuclear engineering, VLSI design, robotics, artificial intelligence, and pattern recognition. The institute maintains interdisciplinary laboratories and collaborates with academic and industrial research organisations.

== Student life ==
=== Student organisations ===
The institute has student organisations related to technical activities, cultural activities, sports, debate, theatre, music, and media. Student chapters of organisations such as the Association for Computing Machinery (ACM), Institute of Electrical and Electronics Engineers (IEEE), American Society of Civil Engineers (ASCE), American Society of Mechanical Engineers (ASME), and Indian Society for Technical Education (ISTE) operate on campus.

The institute also has a student media organisation known as The MIT Post.

=== National Service Scheme ===
MIT hosts a chapter of the National Service Scheme (NSS), which organises community outreach programmes including blood donation drives, awareness campaigns, and social service activities.

=== Student engineering projects ===
Student engineering teams at MIT participate in competitions related to automotive engineering, rocketry, robotics, aeromodelling, and rover design.

Notable student projects include:

- RoboManipal, the official robotics team of MIT manipal
- Formula Manipal, a Formula Student racing team
- thrustMIT, a student rocketry team
- Project Manas, an artificial intelligence and autonomous systems team
- AeroMIT, an aeromodelling and drone research team
- Mars Rover Manipal, a rover design and robotics team

== Festivals ==
MIT hosts annual student festivals including TechTatva, a technical festival held during the odd semester, and Revels, a cultural and sports festival held during the even semester. Both festivals are organised primarily by students and attract participation from colleges and institutions across India. TechTatva includes technical workshops, hackathons, and project exhibitions, while Revels features music performances, dance competitions, and sports events.

== Controversies ==
In 2012, director Kum Kum Garg resigned following student protests related to remarks concerning the death of a student in a bus accident.

In 2020, students raised concerns regarding the use of the PEXA Lite software for online examinations, citing technical and privacy-related issues.

During the COVID-19 pandemic in India, the institute faced criticism regarding campus reopening policies and COVID-19 outbreaks among students in 2021.

== Notable alumni ==
- Rajeev Chandrasekhar
- Satya Nadella
- Rajeev Suri
- Faizal Kottikollon
- M. G. George Muthoot
- Parvati Nair
- I. M. Jayarama Shetty

== Notable faculty ==
- R. K. Baliga
- K. P. Rao
