= Manipal Academy of Higher Education =

Private deemed university in Manipal, India

- Official seal of MAHE
- Motto: Inspired by Life
- Type: Institution of Eminence Deemed to be University
- Established: 1953; 73 years ago
- Founder: T. M. A. Pai
- Affiliations: UGC
- Chancellor: Dr. Ramdas Madhava Pai
- Vice-Chancellor: Dr. Sharath K. Rao
- President: Dr. Ranjan Pai
- Administrative staff: --
- Students: 30,000+
- Location: Karnataka, India
- Colours: Black and Orange
- Website: www.manipal.edu

The Manipal Academy of Higher Education (MAHE) is a private deemed university in the Udupi district of Karnataka, India. The school has campuses in Mangaluru, Bengaluru, and Jamshedpur in India, as well as global campuses in Dubai and Malaysia. Its sister universities are Manipal University Jaipur and Sikkim Manipal University, all managed by the Manipal Education and Medical Group (MEMG).

== Governance ==
At MAHE, Dr. Ramdas Madhava Pai is the Chancellor. Dr. Ranjan Pai acts as the President, while Dr. Hebri Subhaskrishna Ballal holds the position of Pro Chancellor. The university's governance is overseen by Dr. Sharath K. Rao, who serves as the Vice Chancellor.

== History ==
In 1953, T. M. A. Pai founded India's first private medical school, the Kasturba Medical College, and five years later the Manipal Institute of Technology was established. Initially, degrees were awarded by Karnataka University, Dharwad and later by the University of Mysore. From 1980 to 1993 they were awarded by Mangalore University. The current organizational structure was formed in 1993 when Kasturba Medical College and Manipal College of Dental Sciences were accorded deemed university status by UGC. Manipal Institute of Technology became a constituent unit of Manipal Academy of Higher Education in 2000. In 2022, MAHE introduced five online degree and diploma programs in business administration, data science, business analytics, and logistics and supply chain. The campus at Manipal covers 600 acres (2.4 km^{2}) of land and is centred in the university town of Manipal.

In 2022, MAHE started offering UGC-entitled online degree programs through Online Manipal platform. Currently, the university offers online MBA for working professionals, online M.Sc. in Data Science, and online M.Sc. in Business Analytics beside online PGCP in Business Analytics and PGCP in Logistics & Supply Chain Management.

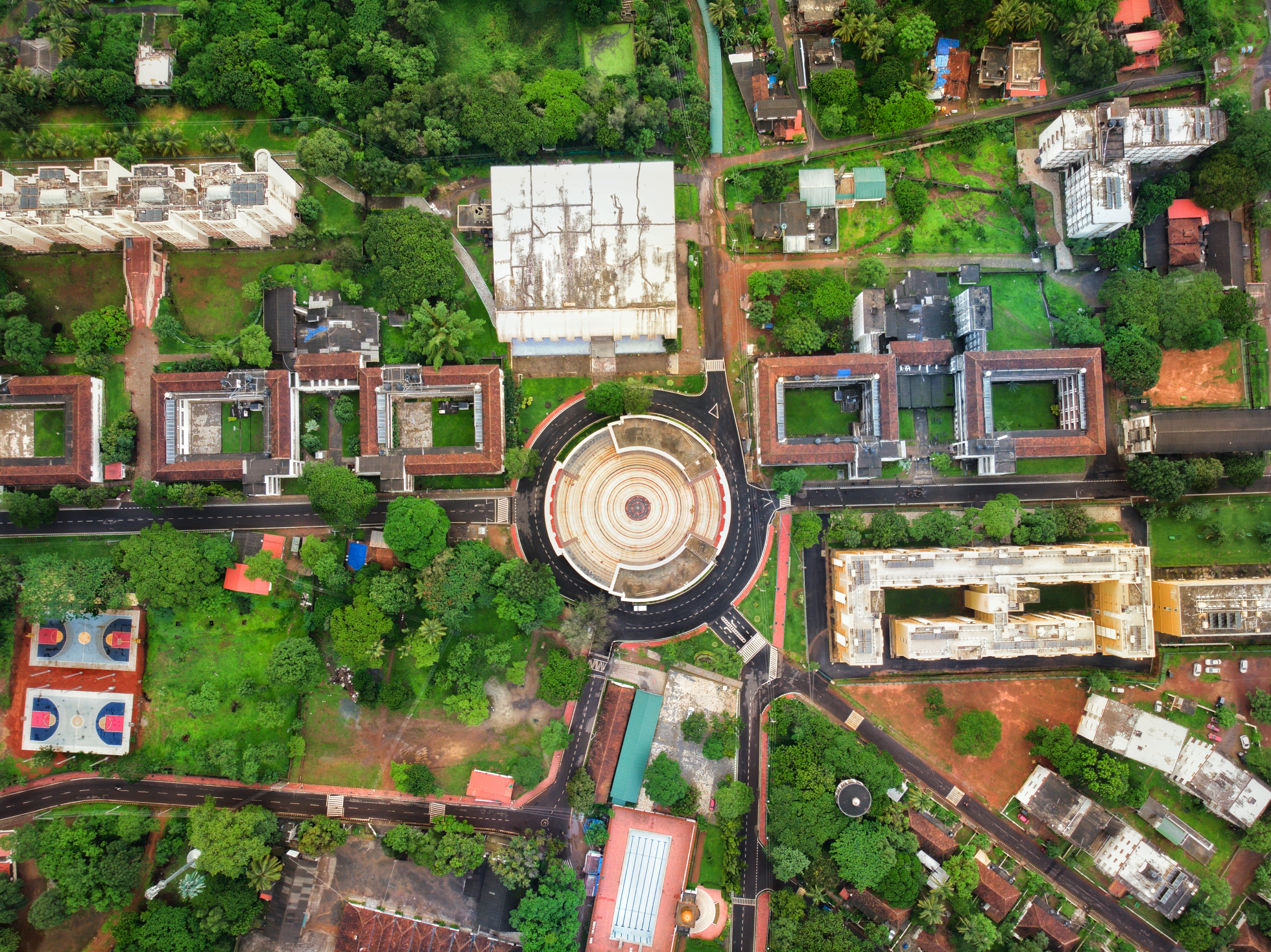
Aerial View of the Student Plaza

== Academics ==
Manipal Academy of Higher Education was conferred the Institutes of Eminence status by the Ministry of Education, Government of India, in 2020. Internationally, Manipal Academy of Higher Education was ranked 901-950 in the QS World University Rankings of 2025 and 197 in Asia. It was ranked 801–1000 in the world by the Times Higher Education World University Rankings of 2025, 201–250 in Asia in 2024 and 301–350 among emerging economies. In India, MAHE has been accredited by NAAC with an A++ Grade, and the National Institutional Ranking Framework (NIRF) ranked Manipal Academy of Higher Education 14th overall and 4th among universities in 2024. NIRF also ranked the Manipal College of Pharmaceutical Sciences 8th in 2024.In the IIRF Rankings 2026, MAHE ranked 4th among private universities in India, 1st in Karnataka, and 3rd in the South Zone.

=== Libraries ===
Manipal Academy of Higher Education library system comprises 14 libraries spread across various campuses.

== Research ==
Budgetary provisions are given for research through capital allocations for the maintenance of animal facilities, consumables, equipment etc. ₹15 million (US$160,000) was sanctioned to the Manipal Institute of Technology in 2008–2009 towards funding innovation. MCOPS, Manipal sends its second-year postgraduate (PG) students for collaborative research programs at R&D centres all over the country. Often the research carried out by them becomes a part of the intellectual property of the company.

The Manipal Life Science Centre has a research team and is undertaking several research projects funded by DBT, DST, etc. MLSC is linked to several international research institutions such as Wistar Institute Philadelphia, and the University of Queensland.

=== Manipal Advanced Research Group ===
The Manipal Advanced Research Group was formed in early 2006 with an aim to grow new research projects in fundamental sciences and promote interdisciplinary cooperation in areas between basic research, biomedical science and engineering.

=== Rankings ===
Institute rankings

General – international
- QS (World) (2025): 901–950
- QS (Asia) (2024): 210
- Times (World) (2024): 801–1000
- Times (Asia) (2024): 201–250

General – India
- NIRF (Overall) (2024): 14
- NIRF (Universities) (2024): 4

Medical – India
- NIRF (2024): 9

Pharmacy – India
- NIRF (2024): 8

Dental – India
- NIRF (2024): 2

== Notable alumni ==
- Rajeev Chandrasekhar — Indian politician and entrepreneur, former Union Minister of State and former Member of Parliament in the upper house
- Satya Nadella — CEO of Microsoft
- Mirza Faizan — Indian aerospace scientist, developed the Ground Reality Information Processing System, (GRIPS)
- Arun Shenoy — Grammy Award-nominated musician
- Anant J Talaulicar — president and CEO, Cummins India Ltd
- Vikas Khanna — Michelin Guide Star Chef
- Annapoorna Kini — American cardiologist and a professor of cardiology at Mount Sinai School of Medicine in New York City
- Sheikh Muszaphar Shukor — Malaysian orthopedic surgeon and the first Malaysian astronaut
- Junaid Sheikh — actor and model
- Nag Ashwin — film director and screenwriter

== See also ==
- Sikkim Manipal University
- Manipal Hospitals
