= Axis Bank =

Indian private sector bank pvt ltd

Axis Bank Limited
- Type: Public
- Traded as: BSE: 532215; NSE: AXISBANK; LSE: AXB; BSE SENSEX constituent; NSE NIFTY 50 constituent
- ISIN: INE238A01034
- Industry: Financial services
- Founded: 3 December 1993; 32 years ago as UTI Bank
- Headquarters: Axis House, Mumbai, Maharashtra, India
- Number of locations: 6275 (March 2026)
- Key people: Amitabh Chaudhry (MD & CEO); P N Prasad (chairperson)
- Products: Retail banking; Corporate banking; Investment banking; Mortgage loans; Private banking; Wealth management; Asset management; Investment management
- Revenue: ▲₹162,212 crore (US$17 billion) (2026)
- Operating income: ▼₹45,910 crore (US$4.9 billion) (2026)
- Net income: ▼₹26,385 crore (US$2.8 billion) (2026)
- Total assets: ▲₹1,946,050 crore (US$210 billion) (2026)
- Total equity: ▲₹212,957 crore (US$23 billion) (2026)
- Owner: Life Insurance Corporation (9.19%); General Insurance Corporation of India (1.15%); The New India Assurance Company Limited (0.74%)
- Number of employees: 101,300 (as of March 2026)
- Subsidiaries: Axis Asset Management Company Ltd.; Axis Mutual Fund Trustee Ltd.; Axis Capital Ltd.; Axis Finance Ltd.; Axis Securities Ltd.; A.TREDS Ltd.; Axis Bank UK Ltd.; Axis Trustee Services Ltd.; Freecharge; Accelyst Solutions Private Ltd.; Axis Private Equity Ltd.
- Capital ratio: 16.55% (December 2025)
- Website: www.axis.bank.in

Axis Bank Limited is an Indian multinational banking and financial services company headquartered in Mumbai. It is India's third largest private sector bank by assets and fourth largest by market capitalisation. It sells financial services to large and mid-size companies, SMEs and retail businesses.

As of 30 June 2016, 30.81% shares are owned by the promoters and the promoter group (United India Insurance Company Limited, Oriental Insurance Company Limited, National Insurance Company Limited, New India Assurance, General Insurance Corporation of India, Life Insurance Corporation of India and Unit Trust of India). The remaining 69.19% shares are owned by mutual funds, FIIs, banks, insurance companies, corporate bodies and individual investors.

== History ==
The bank was founded on 3 December 1993 as UTI Bank as a part of Unit Trust of India, a Government of India entity, opening its registered office in Ahmedabad and a corporate office in Mumbai. The bank was promoted jointly by the Administrator of the Unit Trust of India (UTI), Life Insurance Corporation of India (LIC), General Insurance Corporation, National Insurance Company, The New India Assurance Company, The Oriental Insurance Corporation and United India Insurance Company. The first branch was inaugurated on 2 April 1994 in Ahmedabad by Manmohan Singh, then finance minister of India.

In 2001 UTI Bank agreed to merge with Global Trust Bank, but the Reserve Bank of India (RBI) withheld approval and the merger did not take place. In 2004, the RBI put Global Trust under moratorium and supervised its merger with Oriental Bank of Commerce. The following year, UTI bank was listed on the London Stock Exchange. In 2006, UTI Bank opened its first overseas branch in Singapore. The same year it opened an office in Shanghai, China. In 2007, it opened a branch in the Dubai International Financial Centre and branches in Hong Kong.

On 30 July 2007, UTI Bank changed its name to Axis Bank.

In 2009, Shikha Sharma was appointed as the MD and CEO of Axis Bank.

In 2013, Axis Bank's subsidiary, Axis Bank UK commenced banking operations.

In March 2014, the Indian government sold a 9% stake, out of its total 20.7% stake in Axis Bank.

In 2017, Axis Bank acquired Freecharge, a digital marketplace for financial services for approximately ₹385 crore.

On 1 January 2019, Amitabh Chaudhry took over as MD and CEO.

In 2021, Axis Bank reduced its stake in Yes Bank from 2.39% to 1.96%.

In 2023, Axis Bank completed the acquisition of Citibank India's consumer banking business for ₹12,325 crore (US$1.57 billion).

In 2025, Axis Bank partnered with J.P. Morgan to provide real-time U.S. dollar payment capabilities for commercial clients in India.

On September 30th, 2026, Axis Bank became the initial launching partner for Apple Pay in India.

== Operations ==
=== Indian business ===
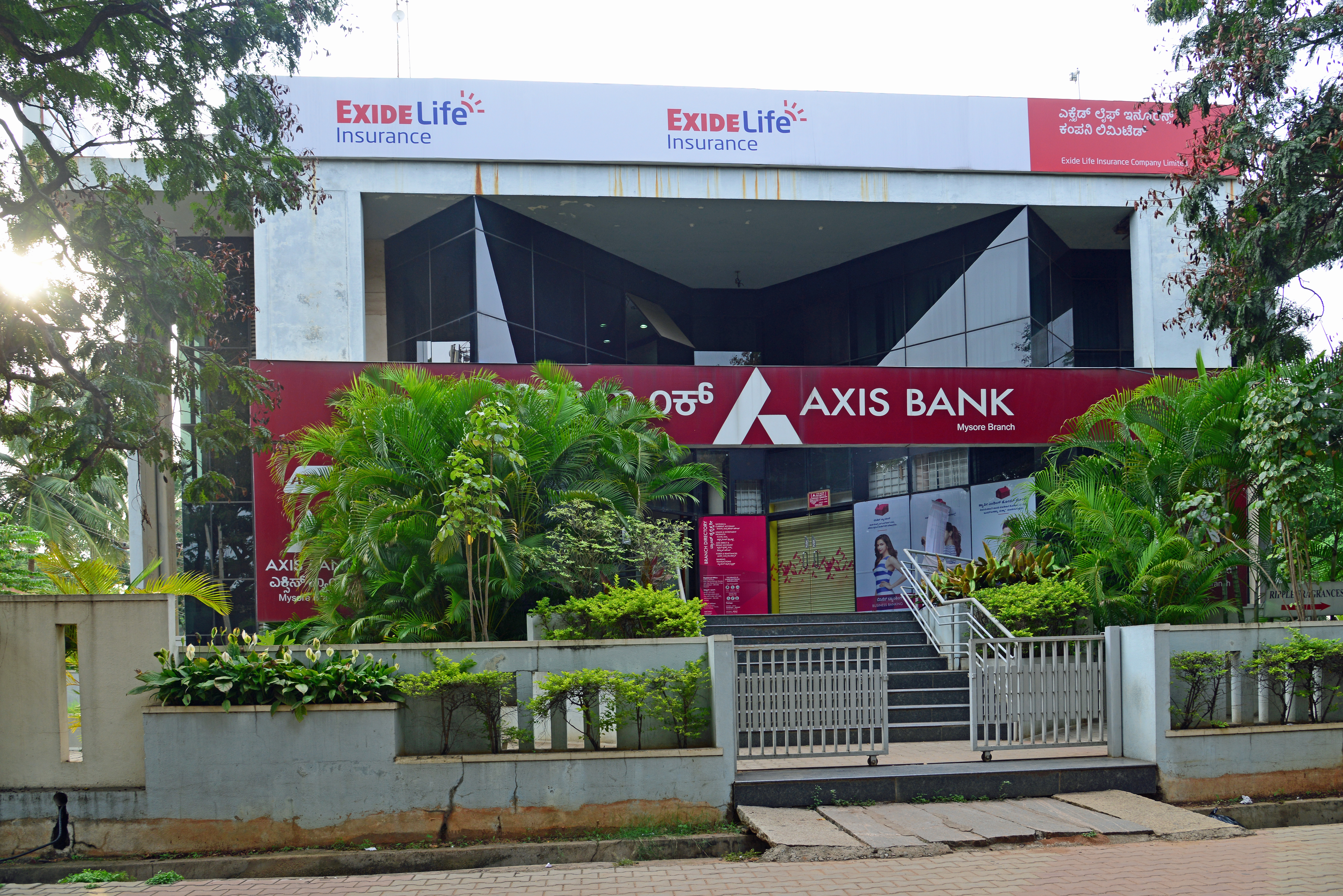
Axis Bank branch in Mysore

As of 31 December 2024, the bank had a network of 5,706 branches and extension counters, 14,476 automated teller machines and cash recyclers.

=== International business ===
The bank has nine international offices with branches at Singapore, Hong Kong, Dubai (at the DIFC), Shanghai, Colombo and representative offices at Dhaka, Dubai, Sharjah and Abu Dhabi, which focus on corporate lending, trade finance, syndication, investment banking and liability businesses. In addition, the bank has a presence in UK with its wholly owned subsidiary Axis Bank UK Limited.

== Services ==
=== Retail banking ===
The bank offers lending services to individuals and small businesses, along with liability products, card services, Internet banking, automated teller machines services, depository, financial advisory services, and Non-resident Indian (NRI) services. Axis bank is a participant in RBI's NEFT enabled participating banks list.

=== Corporate banking ===
Transaction banking: Axis Bank provides products and services related to transaction banking to customers in areas of current accounts, cash management services, capital market services, trade, foreign exchange and derivatives, cross-border trade and correspondent banking services, and tax collections on behalf of the Government and various State Governments in India.

Investment banking and trustee services: The bank provides investment banking and trusteeship services through its owned subsidiaries. Axis Capital Limited provides investment banking services relating to equity capital markets, institutional stock brokering besides M&A advisory. Axis Trustee Services Limited is engaged in trusteeship activities, acting as a debenture trustee and as a trustee to various securitization trusts.

=== International banking ===
The bank offers corporate banking, trade finance, treasury and risk management through the branches at Singapore, Hong Kong, Dubai, Shanghai and Colombo, and as also retail liability products from its branches at Hong Kong and Colombo. The representative office at Dhaka was inaugurated during the current financial year.

== Listing and shareholding ==
Axis Banks's equity shares are listed on the Bombay Stock Exchange (BSE) and National Stock Exchange of India (NSE). The company's global depository receipts (GDRs) are listed on the London Stock Exchange. The Bonds issued by the bank under the MTN program are listed on the Singapore Stock Exchange.

== Issues and concerns ==
=== Operation Red Spider ===
An Indian online magazine conducted a sting operation which was publicised along with 2013 videos evidence showing a wide range of violations and money laundering schemes by top officials at a number of Indian banks, including Axis Bank. Consequently, penalties of ₹50 million (US$530,000) on Axis Bank, ₹45 million (US$480,000) on HDFC Bank, and ₹10 million (US$110,000) on ICICI Bank were imposed by the Reserve Bank of India.

=== 2016 demonetisation-related money laundering ===
Following the 2016 Indian banknote demonetisation, a number of Axis Bank employees were arrested for facilitating money laundering activities. Some media outlets highlighted the disproportionate number of cases involving the bank, and claimed that the bank's aggressive performance targets and internal culture fostered such activities and that the blame does not lie solely in the hands of arrested employees.

== Subsidiaries ==
=== Axis Capital Ltd. ===
Axis Capital Ltd. was incorporated in India as a wholly owned subsidiary of the bank on 6 December 2005 and received its certificate of commencement of business on 2 May 2006. Certain businesses of M/s. Enam Securities Pvt. Ltd. were merged with Axis Capital Ltd. as part of a scheme and the following companies became direct subsidiaries of Axis Capital:

1. Axis Securities Ltd. (formerly Enam Securities Direct Pvt. Ltd.)
2. Axis Finance Ltd. (formerly Enam Finance Pvt. Ltd.)
3. Axis Securities Europe Ltd. (formerly Enam Securities Europe Ltd.)
4. Enam International Ltd., UAE (voluntarily dissolved with effect from 24 August 2014)

Axis Securities Ltd., Axis Finance Ltd. and Axis Securities Europe Ltd. later became direct subsidiaries of the bank in line with the RBI directives.

In 2024, Axis Capital was barred from taking on any new debt assignments by SEBI, the Indian securities regulator, on account of irregularities it found in the non-convertible debentures (NCDs) issue of Sojo Infotel, a tech consultancy.

=== Axis Securities Ltd. ===
Axis Securities Ltd.was incorporated in India on 21 July 2006. The sales and securities business, including the retail broking business of Axis Capital Ltd, was merged with ASL on 25 May 2013. ASL is a wholly owned subsidiary of the bank and offers retail asset products, credit cards and retail brokerage services.

=== Axis Mutual Fund ===
Axis Mutual Fund is a subsidiary of Axis Bank established in 2009 with in headquarters in Mumbai.

== See also ==
- Banking in India
- List of banks in India
- Reserve Bank of India
- Indian Financial System Code
