= Healthcare in India =

Healthcare in India follows a multi-payer universal health care model, and is paid for by a combination of public and government regulated private health insurances. Public hospitals are almost entirely tax-funded. The public hospital system is essentially free for all Indian residents except for small, often symbolic co-payments for some services.

The 2022-23 Economic Survey highlighted that the Central and State Governments' budgeted expenditure on the health sector reached 2.1% of GDP in FY23 and 2.2% in FY22, against 1.6% in FY21. India ranks 78th and has one of the lowest healthcare spending as a percent of GDP. It ranks 77th on the list of countries by total health expenditure per capita.

== History ==
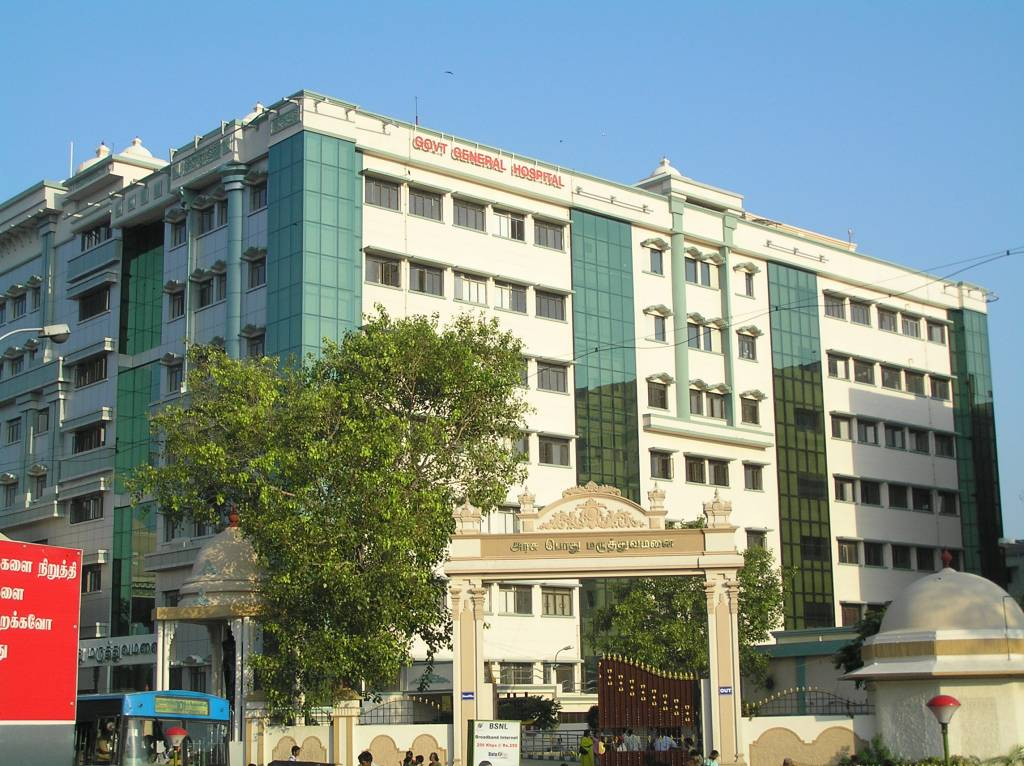
The Rajiv Gandhi Government General Hospital in Chennai, the first modern hospital in India, established in 1664.

The Portuguese and the East India Company were the first to introduce Western medicine to India, in the 16th and 17th centuries. By 1785, medical departments to look after military personnel and civilians were established in the Bengal, Madras, and Bombay presidencies. After the East India Company was dissolved, and the British Government came to power, several branches of organized medical services were set up.

In 1896, the Indian Medical Services (IMS) were formed, and the central government was responsible for medical departments until 1919, when the Montgomery-Chelmsford Constitutional Reforms transferred public health and sanitation responsibilities to the provinces.

Madras General Hospital, established in 1679, was the first hospital in India.

== Healthcare system ==
=== Public healthcare ===
Public healthcare is free for every Indian resident. The Indian public health sector encompasses 18% of total outpatient care and 44% of total inpatient care.

The public healthcare system was originally developed to provide access to healthcare regardless of socioeconomic status or caste, however, reliance on private and public healthcare sectors varies significantly between states. Women and the elderly, as well as individuals with lower incomes, are more likely to use public healthcare.

More than 57% of households prefer private healthcare over public, and cite poor quality of care in the public sector. Much of the public healthcare sector caters to the rural areas, and the poor quality arises from the reluctance of experienced healthcare providers to visit the rural areas. Consequently, the majority of the public healthcare system catering to the rural and remote areas relies on inexperienced and unmotivated interns who are mandated to spend time in public healthcare clinics as part of their curricular requirement. Other major reasons are long distances between public hospitals and residential areas, long wait times, and inconvenient hours of operation.

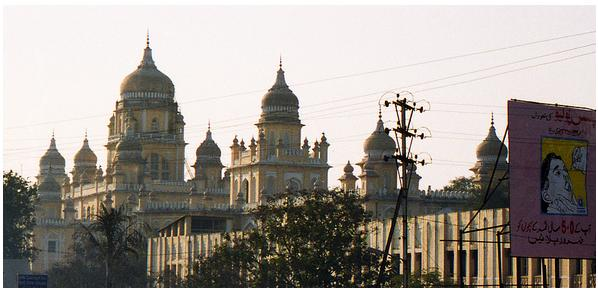
Osmania General Hospital Hyderabad

Healthcare decision-making is divided between the state and national government systems, as the national government addresses broadly applicable healthcare issues such as overall family welfare and prevention of major diseases, while the state governments oversee local hospitals, and local sanitation. Interaction between the state and national governments does occur for healthcare issues that require larger scale resources or present a concern to the country as a whole.

Considering the goal of obtaining universal health care as part of Sustainable Development Goals, scholars request policy makers to acknowledge the form of healthcare that many are using. Scholars state that the government has a responsibility to provide health services that are affordable, adequate, new and acceptable for its citizens. Public healthcare is very necessary, especially when considering the costs incurred with private services. Many citizens rely on subsidized healthcare. The national budget, scholars argue, must allocate money to the public healthcare system to ensure the poor are not left with the stress of meeting private sector payments.

Following the 2014 election which brought Prime Minister Narendra Modi to office, the government unveiled plans for a nationwide universal health care system known as the National Health Assurance Mission, which would provide all citizens with free drugs, diagnostic treatments, and insurance for serious ailments. In 2015, implementation of a universal health care system was delayed due to budgetary concerns. In April 2018 the government announced the Aayushman Bharat scheme that aims to cover up to 100,000,000 vulnerable families (approximately 500,000,000 persons – 40% of the country's population). This will cost around $1.7 billion each year. Provision would be partly through private providers.

In 2017, the Medical Technology Assessment Board and its secretariat Health Technology Assessment in India. The Health Financing and Technology Assessment (HeFTA) unit within the National Health Authority (NHA) in 2022 further enhanced evidence-based decision-making processes in prioritizing health benefits and demonstrating significant cost savings to the PM-JAY as a result of health technology assessment (HTA).

Public healthcare in India is primarily organized through a three-tier system: Sub-Centres and Primary Health Centres (PHCs) at the village level, Community Health Centres (CHCs) at the block level, and District Hospitals (DHs) at the district level. In addition to this structure, some states also operate Sub-District Hospitals (tehsil level), General Hospitals, Speciality Hospitals, and Government Medical College Hospitals (GMCHs), which provide tertiary care and function as teaching institutions. In addition to these, institutions offering alternative systems of medicine—such as Ayurveda, Yoga, Naturopathy, Unani, Siddha, and Homeopathy (AYUSH)—are also part of the public healthcare network. These healthcare facilities are primarily funded and administered by the respective State or Union Territory governments, with additional financial and programmatic support from the Central Government.

=== Private healthcare ===
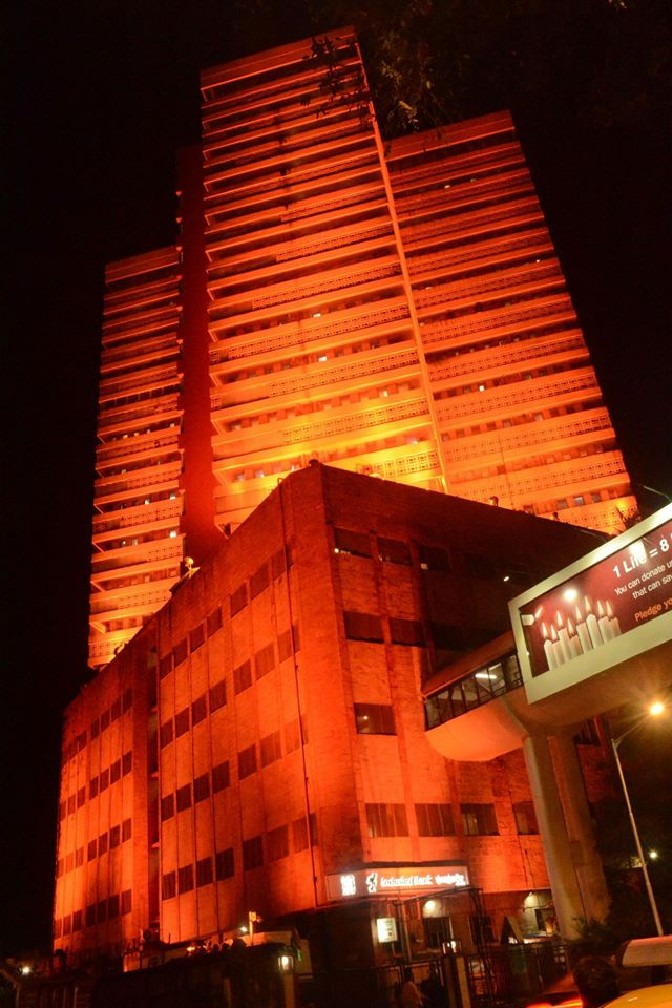
Hinduja National Hospital at Mumbai, India

Since 2005, most of the healthcare capacity added has been in the private sector, or in partnership with the private sector. The private sector consists of 63% of the hospitals in the country, 29% of beds in hospitals, and 81% of doctors.

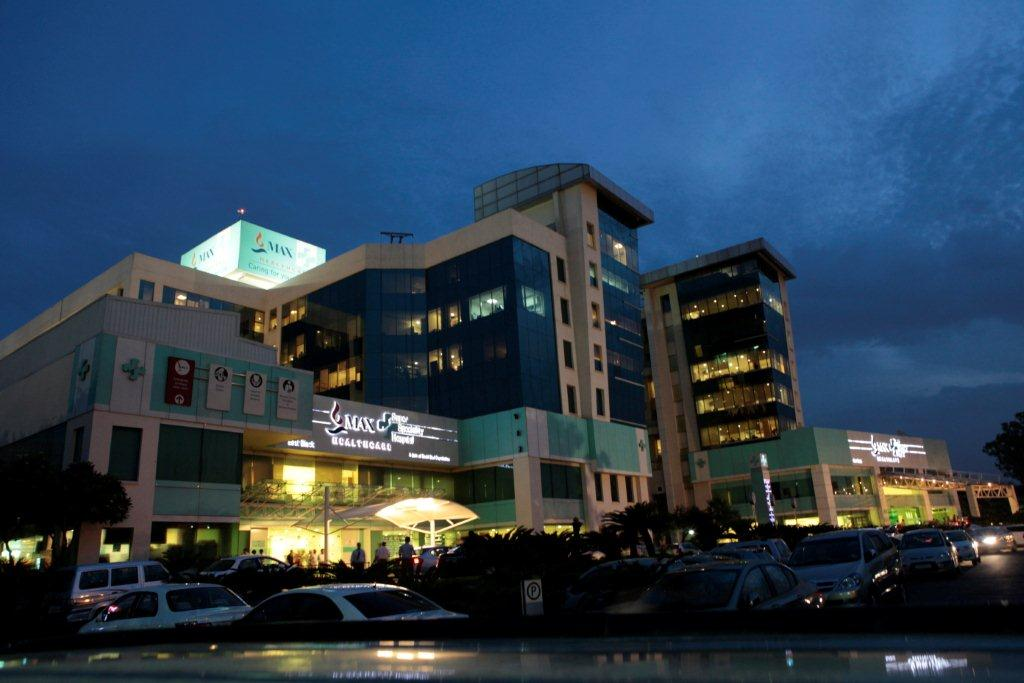
Max Healthcare in Delhi, India

According to National Family Health Survey-3, the private medical sector remains the primary source of health care for 70% of households in urban areas and 63% of households in rural areas. The study conducted by IMS Institute for Healthcare Informatics in 2013, across 12 states in over 14,000 households indicated a steady increase in the usage of private healthcare facilities over the last 25 years for both Out-Patient and In-Patient services, across rural and urban areas. In terms of healthcare quality in the private sector, a 2012 study by Sanjay Basu et al., published in PLOS Medicine, indicated that health care providers in the private sector were more likely to spend a longer duration with their patients and conduct physical exams as a part of the visit compared to those working in public healthcare. However, the high out of pocket cost from the private healthcare sector has led many households to incur Catastrophic Health Expenditure, which can be defined as health expenditure that threatens a household's capacity to maintain a basic standard of living. Costs of the private sector are only increasing. One study found that over 35% of poor Indian households incur such expenditure and this reflects the detrimental state in which Indian health care system is at the moment. With government expenditure on health as a percentage of GDP falling over the years and the rise of private health care sector, the poor are left with fewer options than before to access health care services. Private insurance is available in India, as are various through government-sponsored health insurance schemes. According to the World Bank, about 25% of India's population had some form of health insurance in 2010. A 2014 Indian government study found this to be an over-estimate, and claimed that only about 17% of India's population was insured. Private healthcare providers in India typically offer high quality treatment at unreasonable costs as there is no regulatory authority or statutory neutral body to check for medical malpractices. In Rajasthan, 40% of practitioners did not have a medical degree and 20% have not completed a secondary education. On 27 May 2012, the popular show Satyamev Jayate did an episode on "Does Healthcare Need Healing?" which highlighted the high costs and other malpractices adopted by private clinics and hospitals.

According to Huffington Post, doctors spoke about the problems with "corporate hospitals" and senior surgeons being told to sell surgeries to their patients even if they were not needed. In one instance, a doctor was told he would be sacked if he did not have enough patients to operate on. The majority of India's private, for-profit hospitals charge exorbitant costs for medical services and supplies, which has put a strain on the country's public finances.

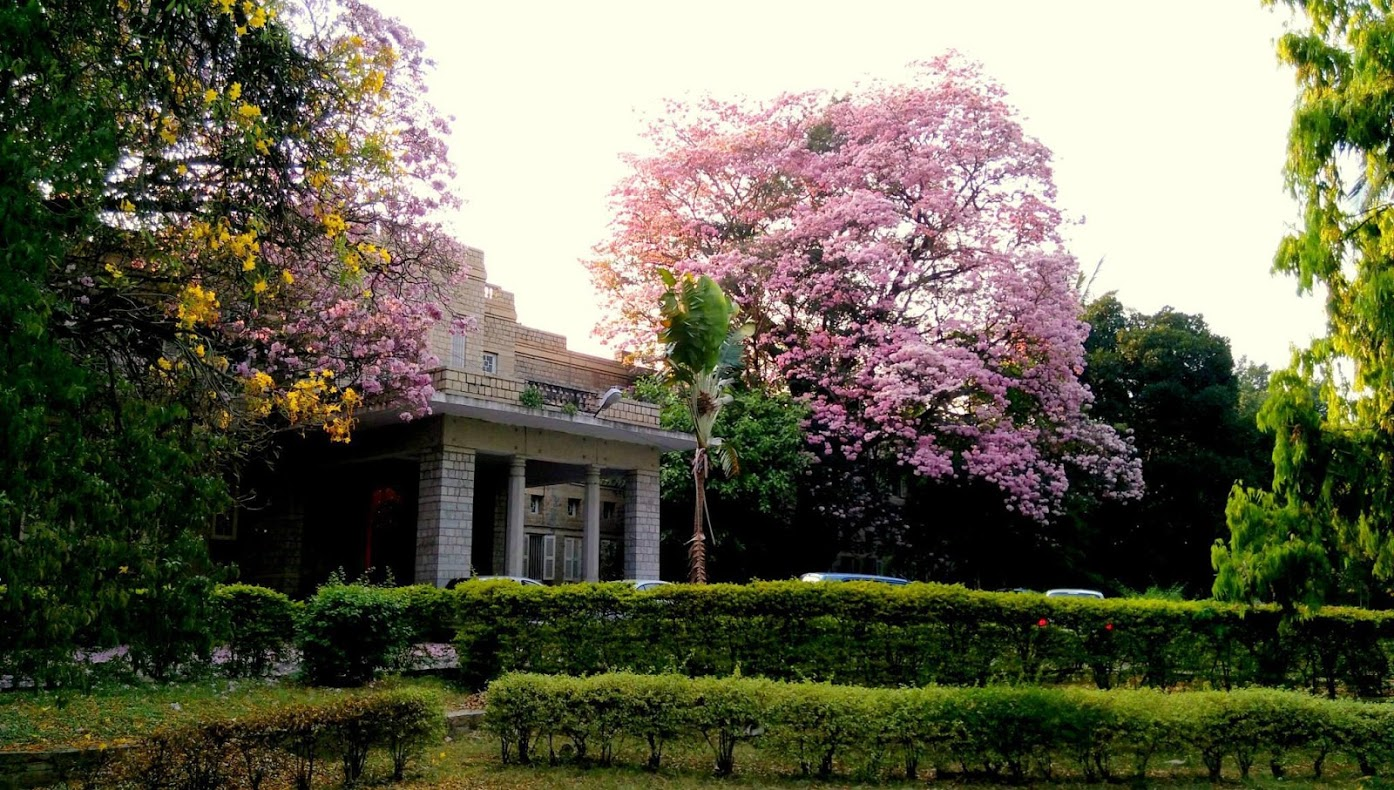
Psychiatry Department, NIMHANS, the apex centre for mental health and neuro studies education in the country.

=== Medication ===
In 1970, the Indian government banned medical patents. India signed the 1995 TRIPS Agreement which allows medical patents, but establishes the compulsory license, where any pharmaceutical company has the right to produce any patented product by paying a fee. This right was used in 2012, when Natco was allowed to produce Nexavar, a cancer drug. In 2005, new legislation stipulated that a medicine could not be patented if it did not result in "the enhancement of the known efficacy of that substance".

Indians consumed the most antibiotics per head in the world in 2010. A 2017 survey determined that 3.16% of the medicines sampled were substandard and 0.0245% were fake.

== Access to healthcare ==
As of 2013, the number of trained medical practitioners in the country was as high as 1.4 million, including 0.7 million graduate allopaths. Yet, India has failed to reach its Millennium Development Goals related to health.

Developed countries have been able to adapt to the changing needs of a growing elderly population faster than India and other countries with similar socioeconomic conditions and have developed models for over seventy years to address these needs, through more inclusive care and health insurance. The definition of 'access is the ability to receive services of a certain quality at a specific cost and convenience.

The healthcare system of India is lacking in three factors related to access to healthcare: provision, utilization, and attainment. Provision, or the supply of healthcare facilities, can lead to utilization, and finally attainment of good health. However, there currently exists a huge gap between these factors, leading to a collapsed system with insufficient access to healthcare. Differential distributions of services, power, and resources have resulted in inequalities in healthcare access. Access and entry into hospitals depends on gender, socioeconomic status, education, wealth, and location of residence (urban versus rural). Furthermore, inequalities in financing healthcare and distance from healthcare facilities are barriers to access.

Additionally, there is a lack of sufficient infrastructure in areas with high concentrations of poor individuals. Large numbers of tribes and ex-untouchables that live in isolated and dispersed areas often have low numbers of professionals.

Finally, health services may have long wait times or consider ailments as not serious enough to treat. Those with the greatest need often do not have access to healthcare.

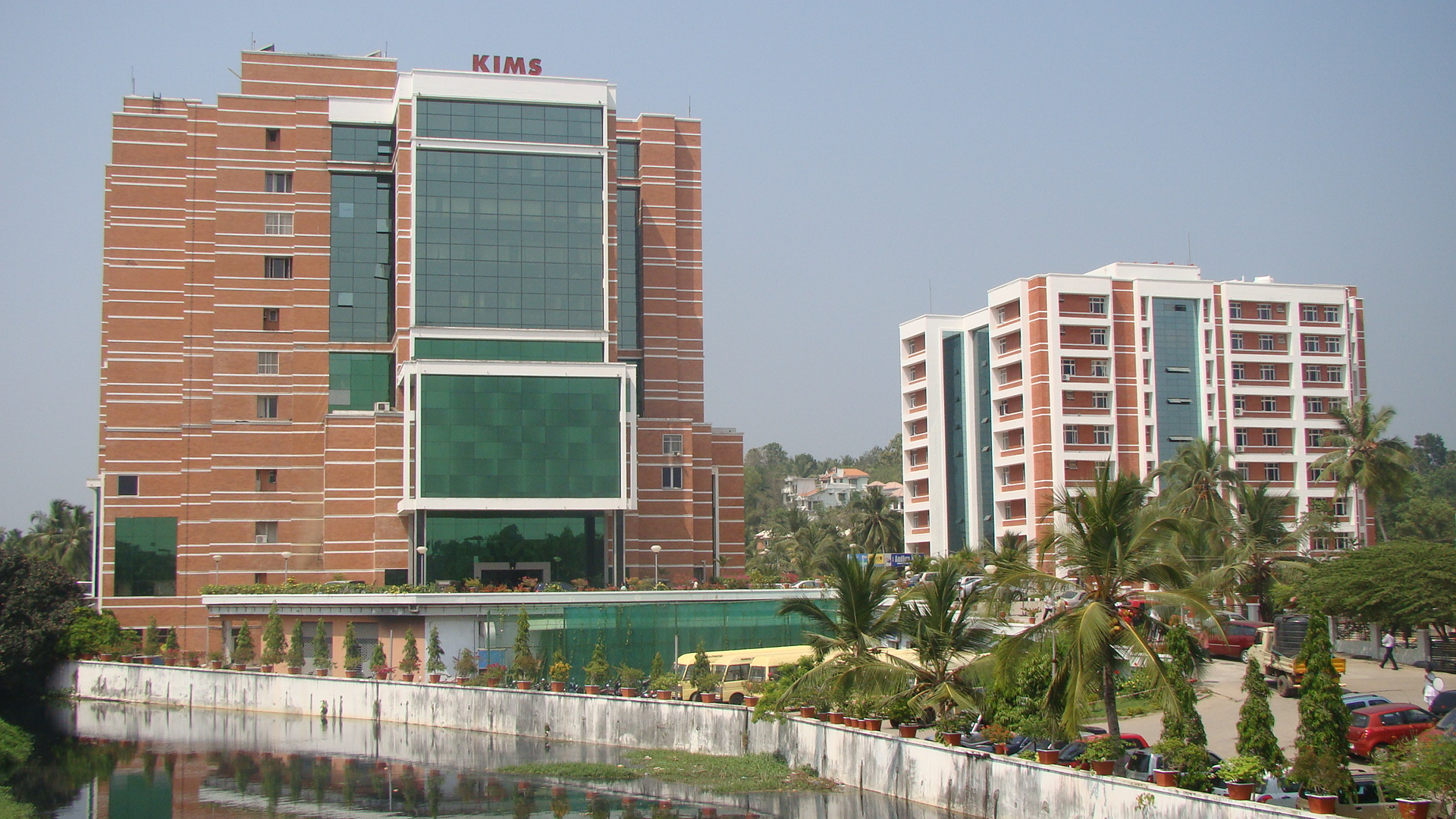
Institute of Medical Sciences in Thiruvananthapuram, Kerala.

=== Electronic health records ===
In 2013, the government unveiled a National Health Portal and came out with guidelines for Electronic health record (EHR) standards in India to enable medical data being portable and easily transferable.

In 2015, a National eHealth Authority (NeHA) was under consideration to standardise, store, and exchange EHRs as part of the government's Digital India programme. The authority was planned to work on the secure and confidential integration of healthcare IT systems, and provide a central EHR repository of all citizens.

=== Rural areas ===
Rural areas in India have a shortage of medical professionals. Due to insufficient housing, low quality schools, and unreliable infrastructure, approximately 74% of doctors practice in urban areas, and service only 28% of the population, leaving 72% of the population without adequate medical care. The lack of care causes rural residents to resort to fraudulent providers. A 2006 study found an under-5 mortality rate of 14 per 1,000 (1.4%) in urban Kerala, compared with 117 per 1,000 (11.7%) in rural Uttar Pradesh.

Children face a myriad of health risks in relation to the healthcare challenges those in rural areas encounter. Across three different measuring points from 1992 through 2006, more developed states in India had a lower proportion of households with an underweight boy or girl than less developed states, which tend to contain more rural communities. Full immunization coverage also varies between rural and urban India, with 39% completely immunized in rural communities and 58% in urban areas across India. Vaccine illiteracy remains a significant obstacle in the path towards greater immunization coverage, often due to misinformation, unreliable healthcare, a lack of awareness among parents, and other social factors. Inequalities in healthcare can result from factors such as socioeconomic status and caste, with caste serving as a social determinant of healthcare in India. One study showed more health disparities arise when comparing urban versus rural homes rather than between castes; using three rounds of the National Family Health Surveys, researchers calculated the Multidimensional Poverty Index, which is aimed at further elucidating the indicators and social determinants of health. Between urban and rural households, the headcount ratio difference was found to be 20-30% in 2005–2006, while between scheduled castes/scheduled tribes and other households the difference was only 10-15%. Other critical social determinants of health in India include sanitation/hygiene, environmental pollution, nutrition, and more. Across all states, less than 50% (and in some less than 25%) of urban homes had unimproved sanitation, compared to over 50% (and in some over 75%) of rural homes, according to the 2007-2009 District Level Household Survey. Sanitation and hygiene are directly linked to disease and overall rural health outcomes.

Similar with many other countries, often those in rural India rely on informal providers to deliver necessary medical care. Utilizing modern and traditional medical practices, such as allopathic medicines and herbal remedies, informal providers have varying degrees of skills and education, but usually no formal medical qualifications. Yet, they far outnumber the quantity of medical providers in India; a study from Madhya Pradesh found there to be 24,807 qualified medical doctors, compared to 89,090 informal providers. They are also the most common first call for those in rural areas requiring medical services. Due to the lack of accessible healthcare in rural India, informal providers respond to much of the resulting unmet medical needs, proving them integral to rural health infrastructure.

==== Case study in Rural India ====
A 2007 study by Vilas Kovai et al., published in the Indian Journal of Ophthalmology analyzed barriers that prevent people from seeking eye care in rural Andhra Pradesh, India. The results displayed that in cases where people had awareness of eyesight issues over the past five years but did not seek treatment, 52% of the respondents had personal reasons (some due to own beliefs about the minimal extent of issues with their vision), 37% economic hardship, and 21% social factors (such as other familial commitments or lacking an accompaniment to the healthcare facility).

The role of technology, specifically mobile phones in health care has also been explored in recent research as India has the second largest wireless communication base in the world, thus providing a potential window for mobile phones to serve in delivering health care. Specifically, in one 2014 study conducted by Sherwin DeSouza et al. in a rural village near Karnataka, India, it was found that participants in community who owned a mobile phone (87%) displayed a high interest rate (99%) in receiving healthcare information through this mode, with a greater preference for voice calls versus SMS (text) messages for the healthcare communication medium. Some specific examples of healthcare information that could be provided includes reminders about vaccinations and medications and general health awareness information.

==== Rural north India ====
The distribution of healthcare providers varies for rural versus urban areas in North India. A 2007 study by Ayesha De Costa and Vinod Diwan, published in Health Policy, conducted in Madhya Pradesh, India examined the distribution of different types of healthcare providers across urban and rural Madhya Pradesh in terms of the differences in access to healthcare through number of providers present. The results indicated that in rural Madhya Pradesh, there was one physician per 7870 people, while there was one physician per 834 people in the urban areas of the region. In terms of other healthcare providers, the study found that of the qualified paramedical staff present in Madhya Pradesh, 71% performed work in the rural areas of the region. In addition, 90% of traditional birth attendants and unqualified healthcare providers in Madhya Pradesh worked in the rural communities.

Studies have also investigated determinants of healthcare-seeking behavior (including socioeconomic status, education level, and gender), and how these contribute to overall access to healthcare accordingly. A 2016 study by Wameq Raza et al., published in BMC Health Services Research, specifically surveyed healthcare-seeking behaviors among people in rural Bihar and Uttar Pradesh, India. The findings of the study displayed some variation according to acute illnesses versus chronic illnesses. In general, it was found that as socioeconomic status increased, the probability of seeking healthcare increased. Educational level did not correlate to probability of healthcare-seeking behavior for acute illnesses, however, there was a positive correlation between educational level and chronic illnesses. This 2016 study also considered the social aspect of gender as a determinant for health-seeking behavior, finding that male children and adult men were more likely to receive treatment for acute ailments compared to their female counterparts in the areas of rural Bihar and Uttar Pradesh represented in the study. These inequalities in healthcare based on gender access contribute towards the differing mortality rates for boys versus girls, with the mortality rates greater for girls compared to boys, even before the age of five.

Other previous studies have also delved into the influence of gender in terms of access to healthcare in rural areas, finding gender inequalities in access to healthcare. A 2002 study with data taken from June 1998 to May 1999 was conducted by Aparna Pandey et al., published in the Journal of Health, Population, and Nutrition, analyzed care-seeking behaviors by families for girls versus boys, given similar sociodemographic characteristics in West Bengal, India. In general, the results exhibited clear gender differences such that boys received treatment from a healthcare facility if needed in 33% of the cases, while girls received treatment in 22% of the instances requiring care. Furthermore, surveys indicated that the greatest gender inequality in access to healthcare in India occurred in the provinces of Haryana, and Punjab.

=== Urban areas ===
The problem of healthcare access arises not only in huge cities but in rapidly growing small urban areas. Here, there are fewer available options for healthcare services and there are less organized governmental bodies. Thus, there is often a lack of accountability and cooperation in healthcare departments in urban areas. It is difficult to pinpoint an establishment responsible for providing urban health services, compared to in rural areas where the responsibility lies with the district administration. Additionally, health inequalities arise in urban areas due to difficulties in residence, socioeconomic status, and discrimination against unlisted slums.

To survive in this environment, urban people use non-governmental, private services which are plentiful. However, these are often understaffed, require three times the payment as a public center, and commonly have bad practice methods. To counter this, there have been efforts to join the public and private sectors in urban areas. An example of this is the Public-Private Partnerships initiative. However, studies show that in contrast to rural areas, qualified physicians tend to reside in urban areas. This can be explained by both urbanization and specialization. Private doctors tend to be specialized in a specific field so they reside in urban areas where there is a higher market and financial ability for those services.

==== National Health Protection Scheme ====
At the federal level, a national publicly funded health insurance program was launched in 2018 by the Government of India, called the National Health Protection Scheme. This aimed to cover the bottom 50% (500 million people) of the country's population working in the unorganized sector (enterprises having less than 10 employees) and offers them free treatment at both public and private hospitals.

===== Employees' State Insurance =====
For people working in the organized sector (enterprises with more than 10 employees) and earning a monthly salary of up to ₹21,000 are covered by the social insurance scheme of Employees' State Insurance which entirely funds their healthcare (along with unemployment benefits), both in public and private hospitals.

===== Employees' Provident Fund Organisation =====
People earning above that threshold are mostly affiliated to the social security body Employees' Provident Fund Organisation and these people are also covered automatically by the National Health Protection Scheme health insurance.

===== Additional Health Insurance by Employers =====
All employers in India are legally mandated to provide additional health insurance coverage to their employees and dependents as part of Social Security in India.

People also receive additional complementary health insurance coverage by their employers through either one of the four main public health insurance funds which are the:

- National Insurance Company
- The Oriental Insurance Company
- United India Insurance Company
- New India Assurance or a private insurance provider.

== Financing ==
India ranks among the lowest in the world in terms of public expenditure on healthcare due to significant limitations in infrastructure and its workforce, along with deficiencies in the quality and availability of healthcare services.

Doctors and healthcare providers are often concentrated in urban environments, which, along with the low government expenditure on healthcare, results in a large percentage of the population being underserved by the Indian healthcare system, and reliant on out-of-pocket payments to fund their care. This often hinders patients from receiving healthcare services and forces between 50 and 60 million people into poverty annually due to drastic medical expenses.

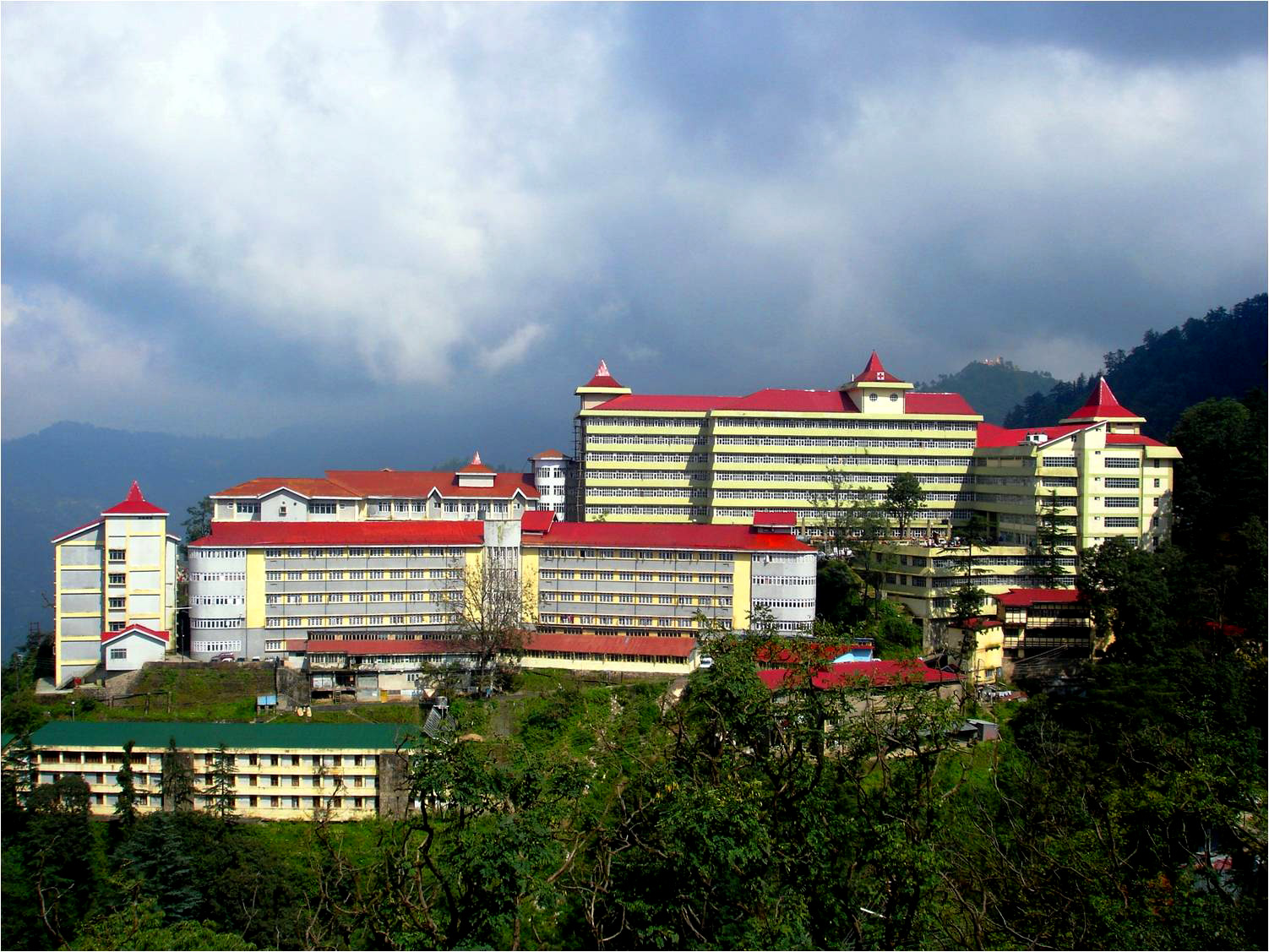
Indira Gandhi Medical College and Hospital, Shimla, Himachal Pradesh

In 2018, out-of-pocket private payments made up 48% of the total expenditure on healthcare, while government and health insurance funds accounted for 62%. This is in stark contrast to most other countries of the world. In 2007, according to the World Health Organization (WHO), India ranked 184 out of 191 countries in the amount of public expenditure spent on healthcare out of total GDP. Public spending stagnated from 0.9% to 1.2% of total GDP in 1990 to 2010 and further increased to 3.2% of GDP in 2018.

Medical and non-medical out-of-pocket private payments can affect access to healthcare. Poorer populations are more affected by this than the wealthy. The poor pay a disproportionately higher percent of their income towards out-of-pocket expenses than the rich. The Round National Sample Survey of 1955 through 1956 showed that 40% of all people sell or borrow assets to pay for hospitalization. Half of the bottom two quintiles go into debt or sell their assets, but only a third of the top quintiles do. In fact, about half the households that drop into the lower classes do so because of health expenditures. This data shows that financial ability plays a role in determining healthcare access.

In terms of non-medical costs, distance can also prevents access to healthcare. Costs of transportation prevent people from going to health centers. According to scholars, outreach programs are necessary to reach marginalized and isolated groups.

In terms of medical costs, out-of-pocket hospitalization fees prevent access to healthcare. 40% of people that are hospitalized are pushed either into lifelong debt or below the poverty line. Furthermore, over 23% of patients don't have enough money to afford treatment and 63% lack regular access to necessary medications. Healthcare and treatment costs have inflated 10–12% a year and with more advancements in medicine, costs of treatment will continue to rise. Finally, the price of medications rise as they are not controlled. However, out-of-pocket expenditure has declined substantially in recent years with the government and health insurance funds accounting for 62% of the total expenditure.

There was a major gap between outreach, finance and access in India. However, with a growing economy, the state developed an enhanced fiscal capacity to cover most citizens and residents of the country with basic health insurance cover.

In 2023, the Human Rights Measurement Initiative found that India is using 84.9% of its resources effectively when fulfilling people's right to health.

=== 2018 ===
According to the National Health Accounts report, the total expenditure on health care as a proportion of GDP in 2018 was 3.2%. Out of 3.2%, the governmental health expenditure as a proportion of GDP is just 2%, and the out-of-pocket expenditure as a proportion of the current health expenditure was 42.06% in 2019 while expenditure of the government and health insurance funds increased to 57%.

=== 2019 ===
In 2019, the total net government spending on healthcare was $36 billion or 1.23% of its GDP. India had allocated 1.8% of its GDP to health in 2020–21.

=== 2022 ===
Since 2022, the healthcare funding by the central and state governments increased substantially to $74 billion. Out of pocket expenditure significantly reduced as most healthcare expenditure is met by government health insurance schemes, social health insurances such as the Employees' State Insurance and government regulated (through the Insurance Regulatory and Development Authority) private health insurances, achieving the goal of near-universal health coverage. Since 2020, it is mandatory for private sector employees who are not affiliated to the employees state insurance to receive a government regulated (through the Insurance Regulatory and Development Authority health insurance regulator) health insurance plan through their employer while employees of the public sector receive it through the Central Government Health Plan.

According to the National Health Accounts Estimates for India 2023–24, released in November 2026, government health expenditure rose from ₹1,29,778 crore in 2013–14 to ₹4,14,196 crore in 2023–24, while out-of-pocket expenditure as a share of total health expenditure fell from 64.2 per cent to 42.7 per cent over the same period.

== Policy ==
The National Health Policy was endorsed by the Parliament of India in 1983 and updated in 2002, and then again updated in 2017. The recent four main updates in 2017 mention the need to focus on the growing burden of non-communicable diseases, the emergence of the robust healthcare industry, growing incidences of unsustainable expenditure due to healthcare costs, and rising economic growth enabling enhanced fiscal capacity. Furthermore, in the long-term, the policy aims to set up India's goal to reform its current system to achieve universal health care.

In practice however, the private healthcare sector is responsible for the majority of healthcare in India, and a lot of healthcare expenses are paid directly out of pocket by patients and their families, rather than through health insurance due to incomplete coverage.

Government health policy has thus far largely encouraged private-sector expansion in conjunction with well-designed but limited public health programmes.

== Initiatives to improve access ==
=== Government-led ===
==== The Twelfth Plan ====
The government of India has a Twelfth Plan to expand the National Rural Health Mission to the entire country, known as the National Health Mission. Community based health insurance can assist in providing services to areas with disadvantaged populations. Additionally, it can help to emphasize the responsibility of the local government in making resources available.

==== National Rural Health Mission ====
To counteract the issue of a lack of professionals in rural areas, the government of India wants to create a 'cadre' of rural doctors through governmental organizations. The National Rural Health Mission (NRHM) was launched in April 2005 by the Government of India. The NRHM has outreach strategies for disadvantaged societies in isolated areas. The goal of the NRHM is to provide effective healthcare to rural people with a focus on 18 states with poor public health indicators and/or weak infrastructure. NRHM has 18,000 ambulances and a workforce of 900,000 community health volunteers and 178,000 paid staff. The mission proposes creating a course for medical students that is centered around rural healthcare. Furthermore, NRHM wants to create a compulsory rural service for younger doctors in the hopes that they will remain in rural areas. However, the NRHM has failings. For example, even with the mission, most construction of health related infrastructure occurs in urban cities. Many scholars call for a new approach that is local and specialized to each state's rural areas. Other regional programs such as the Rajiv Aarogyasri Community Health Insurance Scheme in Andhra Pradesh, India have also been implemented by state governments to assist rural populations in healthcare accessibility, but the success of these programs (without other supplemental interventions at the health system level) has been limited. Furthermore, a key goal of the NRHM was to bolster maternal and child health via infrastructural support and incentives, a long-time obstacle in India. The program led to an increase in the number of institutional births, yet labor shortages meant patients received poorer care, trading one challenge for another. Statistically, the infant mortality rate was 58 per 1000 live births in 2005, compared to 34 per 1000 in 2016. While this is a considerable reduction, India also accounted for 17% of global annual child deaths, which must be addressed going forward. Since the program's inception, maternal and child health have significantly improved in the country, yet it remains a pressing health priority.

==== National Urban Health Mission ====
The National Urban Health Mission as a sub-mission of National Health Mission was approved by the cabinet on 1 May 2013. The National Urban Health Mission (NUHM) works in 779 cities and towns with populations of 50,000 each. As urban health professionals are often specialized, current urban healthcare consists of secondary and tertiary, but not primary care. Thus, the mission focuses on expanding primary health services to the urban poor. The initiative recognizes that urban healthcare is lacking due to overpopulation, exclusion of populations, lack of information on health and economic ability, and unorganized health services. Thus, NUHM has appointed three tiers that need improvement: Community level (including outreach programs), Urban Health Center level (including infrastructure and improving existing health systems), and Secondary/Tertiary level (Public-Private Partnerships). Furthermore, the initiative aims to have one Urban Public Health Center for each population of 50,000 and aims to fix current facilities and create new ones. It plans for small municipal governments to take responsibility for planning healthcare facilities that are prioritized towards the urban poor, including unregistered slums and other groups. Additionally, NUHM aims to improve sanitation and drinking water, improve community outreach programs to further access, reduce out-of-pocket expenses for treatment, and initiate monthly health and nutrition days to improve community health.

==== Pradhan Mantri Jan Arogya Yojana (PM-JAY) ====
The Pradhan Mantri Jan Arogya Yojana (PM-JAY) initiative aims to ensure health coverage for the poorer and weaker population. It covers up to Rs. 5 lakh every year (approximately US$5,300 as of 2026), to each of the 100 million families in India, intended to cover costs for secondary and tertiary hospitalization.

National Policy of Older Persons

In 1999, the National Policy on Older Persons was established by the Indian government in 1999 to ensure the well-being of the elderly, and marked the beginning of government intervention in the needs of older persons. Through initiatives like geriatric wards, better training for caregivers and medical school students, and by strengthening community health centres, the policy aimed to guarantee food security, adequate healthcare, and protection against abuse.

The policy additionally advises for old age pensions, development of health insurance to cater to the needs of individuals within varying income brackets, shelter and welfare measures for chronically sick people, and support from private organisations to make up for the care the state cannot provide alone. The Indira Gandhi National Old Age Pension Scheme of 2007 was eventually launched and provided an increase in monthly pension for individuals living below the poverty lines, specifically Rs. 200/- per month for people over the age of 60 and Rs. 500/- per month for people over the age of 80.

=== Public-private partnership ===
One initiative adapted by governments of many states in India to improve access to healthcare entails a combination of public and private sectors. The Public-Private Partnership Initiative (PPP) was created in the hopes of reaching the health-related Millennium Development Goals. In terms of prominence, nearly every new state health initiative includes policies that allow for the involvement of private entities or non-governmental organizations.

==== Major programs ====
Fair Price Shops aim to reduce the costs of medicines, drugs, implants, prosthetics, and orthopedic devices. Currently, there is no competition between pharmacies and medical service stores for the sale of drugs. Thus, the price of drugs is uncontrolled. The Fair Price program creates a bidding system for cheaper prices of medications between drugstores and allows the store with the greatest discount to sell the drug. The program has a minimal cost for the government as fair price shops take the place of drugstores at government hospitals, thus eliminating the need to create new infrastructure for fair price shops. Furthermore, the drugs are unbranded and must be prescribed by their generic name. As there is less advertising required for generic brands, fair price shops require minimal payment from the private sector. Fair Price Shops were introduced in the West Bengal in 2012. By the end of the year, there were 93 stores benefiting 85 lakh people. From December 2012 to November 2014, these shops had saved 250 crore citizens. As doctors prescribe 60% generic drugs, the cost of treatment has been reduced by this program. This is a solution to affordability for health access in West Bengal.

The largest segment of the PPP initiative is the tax-financed program, Rashtriya Swasthya Bima Yojana (RSBY). The scheme is financed 75% by the central government and 25% by the state government. This program aims to reduce medical out-of-pocket costs for hospital treatment and visits by reimbursing those that live below the poverty line. RSBY covers maximum 30,000 rupees in hospital expenses, including pre-existing conditions for up to five members in a family. In 2015, it reached 37 million households consisting of 129 million people below the poverty line. However, a family has to pay 30 rupees to register in the program. Once deemed eligible, family members receive a yellow card. However, studies show that in Maharashtra, those with a lower socioeconomic status tend to not use the service, even if they are eligible. In the state of Uttar Pradesh, geography and council affect participation in the program. Those in the outskirts of villages tend to use the service less than those who live in the center of villages. Additionally, studies show household non-medical expenses as increasing due to this program; the probability of incurring out-of-pocket expenses has increased by 23%. However, RSBY has stopped many from falling into poverty as a result of healthcare. Furthermore, it has improved opportunities for family members to enter the workforce as they can utilize their income for other needs besides healthcare. RSBY has been applied in 25 states of India.

Finally, the National Rural Telemedicine Network connects many healthcare institutions together so doctors and physicians can provide their input into diagnosis and consultations. This reduces the non-medical cost of transportation as patients do not have to travel far to get specific doctor's or specialty's opinions. However, problems arise in terms of the level of care provided by different networks. While some level of care is provided, telemedical initiatives are unable to provide drugs and diagnostic care, a necessity in rural areas.

==== Effectiveness ====
Life expectancy in India

The effectiveness of public-private partnerships in healthcare is hotly disputed. Critics of PPP are concerned of its presentation as a cure-all solution, by which the health infrastructure can be improved. Proponents of PPP claim that these partnerships take advantage of existing infrastructure in order to provide care for the underprivileged.

The results of the PPP in the states of Maharashtra and West Bengal show that all three of these programs are effective when used in combination with federal health services. They assist in filling the gap between outreach and affordability in India. However, even with these programs, high out-of-pocket payments for non-medical expenses are still deterring people from healthcare access. Thus, scholars state that these programs need to be expanded across India.

A case study of tuberculosis control in rural areas, in which PPP was utilized showed limited effectiveness; while the program was moderately effective, a lack of accountability forced the program to shut down. Similar issues in accountability were seen by the parties involved within other PPP schemes. Facilitators and private practitioners, when asked about PPP, identified lack of state support, in the form of adequate funding, and a lack of coordination, as primary reasons why PPP ventures are unsuccessful.

In the most successful PPP ventures, the WHO found that the most prominent factor, aside from financial support, was ownership of the project by state and local governments. It was found that programs sponsored by the state governments were more effective in achieving health goals than programs set by national governments.

India has set up a National Telemedicine Taskforce by the Health Ministry of India, in 2005, paved way for the success of various projects like the ICMR-AROGYASREE, NeHA and VRCs. Telemedicine also helps family physicians by giving them easy access to speciality doctors and helping them in close monitoring of patients. Different types of telemedicine services like store and forward, real-time and remote or self-monitoring provides various educational, healthcare delivery and management, disease screening and disaster management services all over the globe. Even though telemedicine cannot be a solution to all the problems, it can surely help decrease the burden of the healthcare system to a large extent. Recently Dr Edmond Fernandes, Director, Edward & Cynthia Institute of Public Health stated that Public Health must find a place in the National Classification of Occupations 2015 in India to boost the health sector.

International Cooperation

India and the United States (US) have been cooperating in the health sector since the late 1960s. The cooperation has intensified in the past decade, riding on institutional structures established following the launch of the US-India Health Initiative in 2010.

== Quality of healthcare ==
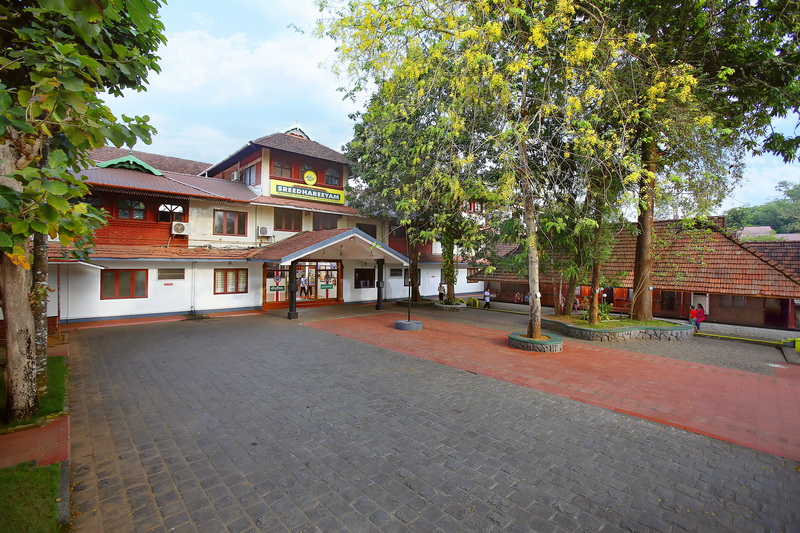
A community medical provider in Kerala which promotes traditional Indian medicine, or Ayurveda.

The lack of diagnostic tools and the reluctance of healthcare professionals to practice in rural, financially less lucrative, and under equipped areas contributes to the low healthcare quality in India. Rural medical practitioners are highly sought after by residents of rural areas as they are more financially affordable and geographically accessible than practitioners working in the formal public health care sector. But there are incidents where doctors were attacked and even killed in rural India. In 2015, the British Medical Journal published a report by Dr Gadre, from Kolkata, who described the extent of malpractice in the Indian healthcare system. He interviewed 78 doctors and found that kickbacks for referrals, irrational drug prescribing and unnecessary interventions were commonplace.

In 2017, Martin Patrick, the chief economist of CPPR at the time, projected that individuals depend on the private sector for healthcare more, and spend almost 24 times more on private healthcare than on public healthcare.

Nearly 80% of public health facilities in India, under the National Health Mission, do not meet the minimum essential standards for infrastructure and workforce as is defined by the Indian Public Health Standards (IPHS).

=== South India ===
Informal providers provide key health care services throughout rural India, including South India, due to a lack of access to qualified professionals and medical resources. Specifically, in Guntur, Andhra Pradesh, India, these informal healthcare providers generally practice in the form of services in the homes of patients and prescribing allopathic drugs. A 2014 study by Meenakshi Gautham et al., published in the journal Health Policy and Planning, found that in Guntur, about 71% of patients received injections from informal healthcare providers as a part of illness management strategies. The study also examined the educational background of the informal healthcare providers and found that of those surveyed, 43% had completed 11 or more years of schooling, while 10% had graduated from college.

In general, the perceived quality of healthcare also has implications on patient adherence to treatment. A 2015 study conducted by Nandakumar Mekoth and Vidya Dalvi, published in Hospital Topics examined different aspects that contribute to a patient's perception of quality of healthcare in Karnataka, India, and how these factors influenced adherence to treatment. The study incorporated aspects related to quality of healthcare including interactive quality of physicians, base-level expectation about primary health care facilities in the area, and non-medical physical facilities (including drinking water and restroom facilities). In terms of adherence to treatment, two sub-factors were investigated, persistence of treatment and treatment-supporting adherence (changes in health behaviors that supplement the overall treatment plan). The findings indicated that the different quality of healthcare factors surveyed all had a direct influence on both sub-factors of adherence to treatment. Furthermore, the base-level expectation component in quality of healthcare perception, presented the most significant influence on overall adherence to treatment, with the interactive quality of physicians having the least influence on adherence to treatment, of three aspects investigated in this study.

Attracting 45 percent of health tourists visiting India and 30 to 40 percent of domestic health tourists, the city of Chennai is termed "India's health capital".

=== North India ===
In a particular district of Uttarakhand, India known as Tehri, the educational background of informal healthcare providers indicated that 94% had completed 11 or more years of schooling, while 43% had graduated from college. In terms of the mode of care delivered, 99% of the health services provided in Tehri were through the clinic, whereas in Guntur, Andhra Pradesh, 25% of the health care services are delivered through the clinic, while 40% of the care provided is mobile (meaning that healthcare providers move from location to location to see patients), and 35% is a combination of clinic and mobile service.

In general throughout India, the private healthcare sector does not have a standard of care that is present across all facilities, leading to many variations in the quality of care provided. In particular, a 2011 study by Padma Bhate-Deosthali et al., published in Reproductive Health Matters, examined the quality of healthcare particularly in the area of maternal services through different regions in Maharashtra, India. The findings indicated that out of 146 maternity hospitals surveyed, 137 of these did not have a qualified midwife, which is crucial for maternity homes as proper care cannot be delivered without midwives in some cases. In addition, the 2007 study by Ayesha De Costa and Vinod Diwan analyzed the distribution of healthcare providers and systems in Madhya Pradesh, India. The results indicated that among solo practitioners in the private sector for that region, 62% practiced allopathic (Western) medicine, while 38% practiced Indian systems of medicine and traditional systems (including, but not limited to ayurveda, sidhi, unani, and homeopathy).

In certain areas, there are also gaps in the knowledge of healthcare providers about certain ailments that further contribute towards quality of healthcare delivered when treatments are not fully supported with thorough knowledge about the ailment. A 2015 study by Manoj Mohanan et al., published in JAMA Pediatrics, investigate the knowledge base of a sample of practitioners (80% without formal medical degrees) in Bihar, India, specifically in the context of childhood diarrhea and pneumonia treatment. The findings indicated that in general, a significant number of practitioners missed asking key diagnostic questions regarding symptoms associated with diarrhea and pneumonia, leading to misjudgments and lack of complete information when prescribing treatments. Among the sample of practitioners studied in rural Bihar, 4% prescribed the correct treatment for the hypothetical diarrhea cases in the study, and 9% gave the correct treatment plan for the hypothetical pneumonia cases presented. Recent studies have examined the role of educational or training programs for healthcare providers in rural areas of North India as a method to promote higher quality of healthcare, though conclusive results have not yet been attained.

== Rankings ==
According to global healthcare security index 2021 India ranked 66 out of 195 countries with an overall Index score of 42.8 and along with a change of -0.8 from 2019.

According to Health and health systems ranking of countries worldwide in 2021, by health index score India was ranked 111 out of 167 countries.

In the 2016 Global Burden of Disease Study Report, India was ranked 145 out of 197 countries in "healthcare access and quality". India was ranked behind war-torn Yemen, Sudan and North Korea.

== See also ==
- Health Advocate
- Health care reform
- Health Insurance Innovations
- Health in India
- List of government schemes in India
- Medical tourism in India
- MEDISEP
- Swachh Bharat Abhiyan
- Women's health in India
- Health insurance in India

=== Healthcare statistics ===
- List of countries by total health expenditure per capita
- Health system
- Health systems by country
- List of countries by hospital beds
- List of countries by life expectancy
- List of countries by infant mortality rate
- List of countries by maternal mortality ratio
- List of OECD health expenditure by country by type of financing
