= Licentiate certificate =

Certification from Insurance Institute of India

- Issuing Organization: Insurance Institute of India
- Validity duration: Lifetime

Subject
- Focus: Foundation and essence of Insurance
- Topics: Principles of Insurance; Practice of Insurance (Life and Non-Life)

Requirements
- Matriculation or equivalent, or; At least three years experience in insurer company
- Type: Online

Relations
- Insurance companies

The Licentiate certificate offered by the Insurance Institute of India (III) is a foundational and essential qualification for individuals aspiring to build a career in the Indian insurance sector. It's the first step in a structured pathway of certifications offered by the Insurance Institute of India, followed by Associateship and Fellowship. The Licentiate certificate is awarded to a candidate after passing the Licentiate examination conducted by the Insurance Institute of India. It is a mandatory certification for confirmation of the service of a probationary Administrative Officer (AO) in a public sector insurance company in India.

== Description ==
Licentiate certification is an introductory course that contains two compulsory papers and one more optional paper from professional exam curriculum. The two compulsory papers are Principles of Insurance and Practice of Insurance (Life and Non-Life). In this stage, a candidate needs to earn at least 60 credit points to qualify the certification. The licentiate certification is the first stage of the flagship course Fellowship Diploma in the Insurance Institute of India. It is the first level certification of the diploma course provided by the institute.

The eligibility criteria for the registration of the professional examination of the licentiate certificate is either matriculation or equivalent examination passed certificate. Similarly, if a candidate has worked for at least three years in insurer company then he is also eligible to register for the licentiate examination.

== History ==
In 1955, the Insurance Institute of India which was originally known as Federation of Insurance Institutes was established. The first examination for the licentiate certificate was held in the year 1957.

== Uses and recognitions ==
The National Insurance Company Ltd (NICL) of India requires the Licentiate certificate issued by the Insurance Institute of India at the time of confirmation of a probationary Administrative Officer of the company. Similarly the New India Assurance Company Limited (NIACL) also requires the certification of Licentiate for the confirmation of its probationary Administrative Officers in the company. A probationary Administrative Officer (AO) in the United India Insurance Company (UIIC) has to pass the examination of the Licentiate certificate to become eligible for confirmation of his service in the organisation.

== Notable Licentiates ==
The current chairman Siddhartha Mohanty of the Life Insurance Corporation in India is a notable holder of the Licentiate certificate. Similarly Rajesh Krishnan, the Chief of Operations & Customer Experience at the Indian private insurance company Bajaj Allianz Life Insurance is also the Licentiate holder.
