= NHA =

NHA may refer to:

== Canada ==
- National Hockey Association
- National Housing Act, 1938

== India ==
- National Health Authority

== Philippines ==
- National Housing Authority (Philippines)

== United Kingdom ==
- National Health Action Party, a political party in England

== United States ==
- National Healthcareer Association
- National Housing Act of 1934
- National Hydrogen Association
- National Heritage Academies

== Vietnam ==
- NHA, the IATA code for Nha Trang Air Base

== Other uses ==
- 8895 Nha, a main-belt asteroid
- National Health Accounts, a process for monitoring the flow of money in the health sector
- National Highways Authority (disambiguation)
- Neuchâtel Hockey Academy, Swiss ice hockey club
- Nursing home administrator
- National Hockey Association
