= New India Assurance =

Indian public sector insurance company

The New India Assurance Company Limited

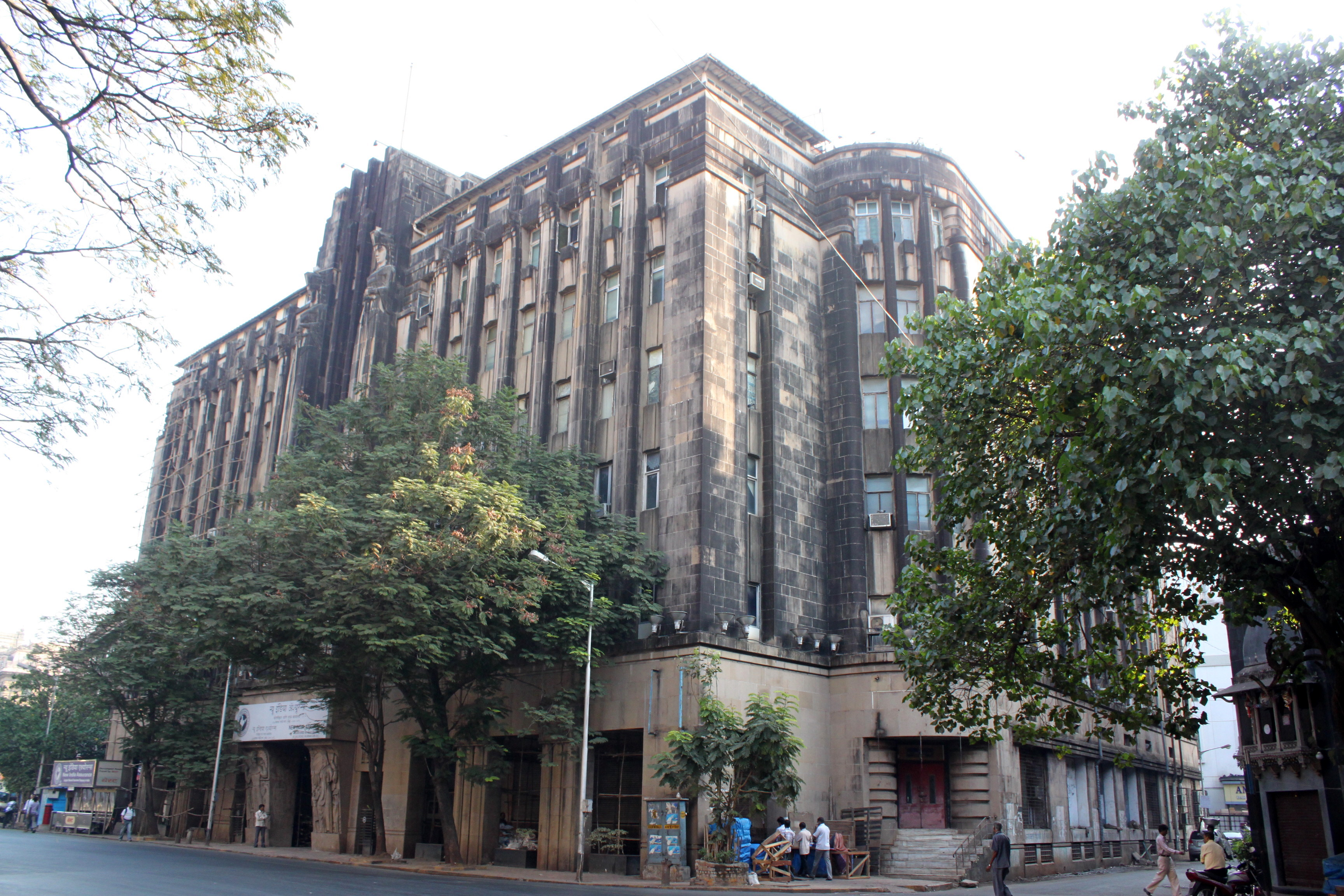
- New India Assurance Building, Mumbai, Maharashtra
- Type: Central Public sector undertaking
- Traded as: BSE: 540769; NSE: NIACL
- Industry: Insurance
- Founded: 23 July 1919; 107 years ago
- Founders: Dorabji Tata
- Headquarters: Mumbai, Maharashtra, India
- Area served: India
- Key people: Lavanya R Mundayur (Chairman and Managing Director)
- Products: General insurance; Vehicle insurance; Health insurance; Marine insurance; Property insurance; Crop insurance; Aviation insurance; Fidelity bond
- Revenue: ▲₹47,174 crore (US$5.0 billion) (2026)
- Operating income: ▲₹1,261 crore (US$130 million) (2026)
- Net income: ▲₹1,384 crore (US$150 million) (2026)
- Total assets: ▲₹114,250 crore (US$12 billion) (2026)
- Total equity: ▲₹37,497 crore (US$4.0 billion) (2026)
- Owner: Government of India (85.44%)
- Number of employees: 14,700 (2026)
- Website: newindia.co.in

The New India Assurance Co. Ltd. (NIACL) is an Indian public sector insurance company owned by the Government of India and administered by the Ministry of Finance. Headquartered in Mumbai, it is the largest nationalised general insurance company of India based on gross premium collection inclusive of foreign operations. It was founded by Sir Dorabji Tata in 1919, and was nationalized in 1973.

Previously, it was a subsidiary of the General Insurance Corporation of India (GIC). But when GIC became a re-insurance company following the passage of the IRDA Act 1999, its four primary insurance subsidiaries New India Assurance, United India Insurance, Oriental Insurance and National Insurance became autonomous.

== History ==
The New India Assurance Company Limited was established on July 23, 1919, by Sir Dorabji Tata in Mumbai. Following the passage of the General Insurance Business (Nationalisation) Act in 1972, the company was officially nationalized by the Government of India in 1973.

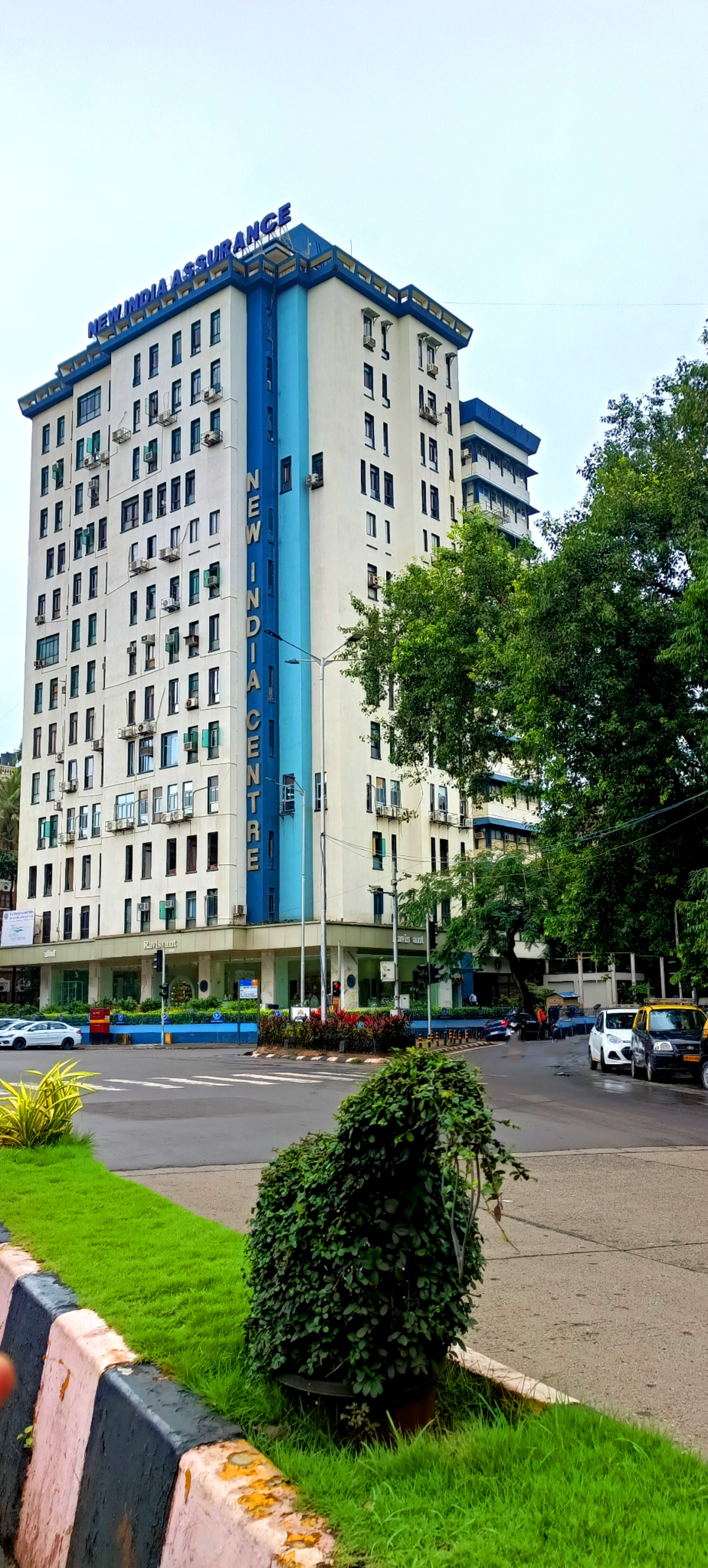
New India Centre Building, Cooperage Road, Mumbai, Maharashtra

The company initiated its global expansion by opening an international branch office in London, United Kingdom.

The enterprise served as a co-promoter in founding public entities including the Agriculture Insurance Company of India and GIC Housing Finance.

The Insurance Regulatory and Development Authority of India (IRDAI) designated New India Assurance as a Domestic Systemically Important Insurer.

== Workforce ==
Employee Strength as on 31 March 2026
Category Of Employees	Male	Female	Total
Class I	4,503	2,455	6,958
Class II	70	3	73
Class III	2,075	695	2,770
Class IV (Excluding PTS)	441	161	602
Part Time Sweepers	2	0	2
Total	7,091	3,314	10,405

The company's achievements include:

- Market leadership position for four consecutive decades.
- The ratio of available solvency margin to required solvency margin standing at 2.3 times(Global).
- Total net worth of ₹28,895 crores.
- Total assets - crossed ₹61720 crores.
- Only Indian General Insurance Company to have presence in over 24 countries.
