= Vijaya Diagnostic Centre =

Indian medical diagnostics company

Vijaya Diagnostic Centre Limited
- Type: Public
- Traded as: BSE: 543350; NSE: VIJAYA
- Industry: Healthcare; Medical diagnostics
- Founded: 1981; 45 years ago
- Founder: S. Surendranath Reddy
- Headquarters: Hyderabad, Telangana, India
- Area served: India
- Key people: S. Surendranath Reddy (Founder & Executive Chairman); Sura Suprita Reddy (CEO & Managing Director); Sunil Chandra Kondapally (Executive Director)
- Services: Pathology and radiology
- Revenue: ₹814.2 crore (US$85 million) (2025-26)
- Website: www.vijayadiagnostic.com

Vijaya Diagnostic Centre Limited is an Indian integrated medical diagnostics chain headquartered in Hyderabad, Telangana. It operates centres providing pathology and radiology services. Founded in 1981 by S. Surendranath Reddy, the business was incorporated in 2002 and listed on the National Stock Exchange of India and the Bombay Stock Exchange in September 2021.

== History ==
S. Surendranath Reddy, a radiologist, established the business in Hyderabad in 1981. It initially operated as a proprietorship and was incorporated as a private limited company in 2002.

In 2014, Vijaya acquired a majority stake in Medinova Diagnostic Services, which had a diagnostic hub in Kolkata. In December 2016, Kedaara Capital had acquired a minority stake in Vijaya for ₹430 crore through a combination of new shares and shares purchased from existing shareholders.

The company went public in September 2021. At the time of the IPO, its network comprised 81 diagnostic centres and 11 reference laboratories across 13 cities and towns.

Vijaya acquired Pune-based PH Diagnostic Centre in December 2023.

The company opened six diagnostic hubs in 2024, with two each in Pune, West Bengal and Bengaluru. Medinova was merged into Vijaya in November 2025 under a scheme approved by the National Company Law Tribunal.

== Operations ==
Vijaya operates a hub-and-spoke network. Larger hubs offer advanced imaging and laboratory services, while smaller centres provide sample collection and basic radiology. Its business is predominantly directed towards individual consumers.

In March 2026, radiology accounted for approximately 37% of revenue.

== Shareholding ==
As of March 2026, the promoter group held approximately 52.5% of the company's equity. Foreign portfolio investors and mutual funds held approximately 13.4% and 29.9%, respectively.

== See also ==
- Healthcare in India
