= Operation Red Spider =

Operation Red Spider was an anti-money laundering sting operation of an online magazine, Cobrapost. The outlet released video footage, recorded largely by hidden cameras, showing high-ranking officials and some employees of the top three Indian banks suggesting to an undercover reporter methods to launder money. The officials offered safe deposit lockers to stash away the black money, accounts that did not adhere to Reserve Bank of India guidelines, and 'benami' (false) accounts to facilitate the conversion of the black money and keep the depositor's identity a secret. The editor of Cobrapost, Aniruddha Bahal, placed the video footage into the public domain on 14 March 2013.

According to Rajiv Takru, Secretary of Financial Services, Government of India, all Indian government agencies and regulators worked together to probe charges. On 14 March 2013 Reserve Bank of India conducted an inquiry into possible violation of its KYC (Know Your Customer) and AML (anti-money laundering) guidelines by ICICI Bank, HDFC Bank and Axis Bank. Following the inquiry, penalty of Rs 5 crore on Axis Bank, Rs 4.5 crore on HDFC Bank and Rs 1 crore on ICICI Bank was imposed by RBI.

On 15 March 2013 ICICI Bank suspended 18 employees. On 16 March 2013 HDFC Bank appointed Deloitte Touche Tohmatsu to carry out an independent forensic inquiry of bank employees who are encouraging customers to evade income tax.

== See also ==
- White-collar crime
- Accounting scandals
- Corporate crime
- Organi-cultural Deviance
- List of scandals in India
