= Insurance Institute of India =

National apex body for insurance underwriters

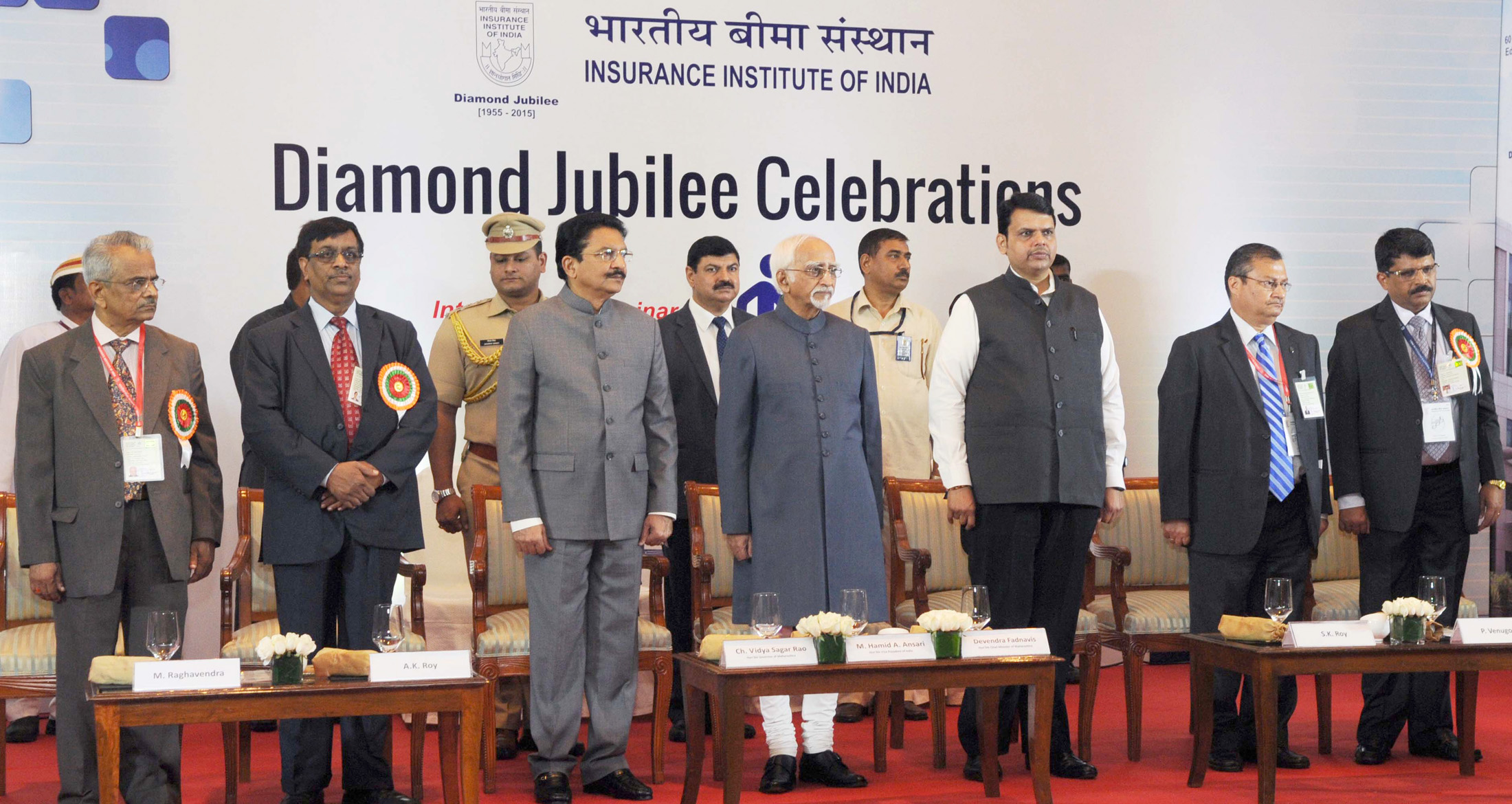
- Mohammad Hamid Ansari at the valedictory function of the diamond jubilee celebrations of the Insurance Institute of India, Mumbai. Present: C. Vidyasagar Rao, governor of Maharashtra, and Devendra Fadnavis, chief minister of Maharashtra, among others.

Agency overview
- Type: National apex body
- Headquarters: Mumbai, Maharashtra
- Website: www.insuranceinstituteofindia.com

The Insurance Institute of India (III) is the sole national apex body for insurance underwriters in India, established in 1955 in Mumbai. The institute, formerly known as Federation of Insurance Institutes (J.C. Setalvad Memorial) (Regd.), was created for the purpose of promoting insurance education and training in India. The institute conducts examinations at various levels. It is the professional institute in India devoted solely to insurance education.

Certificates and diplomas like Licentiate, Associateship and Fellowship, etc. are awarded by the institute to successful candidates. These are recognised by the government of India, the Insurance Regulatory and Development Authority and insurers in India and abroad. These qualifications are recognised by similar institutes in the UK, Canada and the United States, for the grant of exemption from some of their papers.

III is a chartered member of the Institute of Global Insurance Education. The presence of 91 associated iInstitutes spread all over the country and the affiliation of the Sri Lanka Insurance Institute, the Sri Lanka Insurance Academy and The R.I.C.B. Insurance Institute, Bhutan, testify to the prestige and professional repute of the institute.

The institute supports research projects involving insurance and risk management sponsored by public and private organisations.
