= LIC Housing Finance =

Indian state owned housing finance company

LIC Housing Finance Limited
- Type: Public
- Traded as: BSE: 500253; NSE: LICHSGFIN
- Industry: Financial services
- Founded: 19 June 1989 (37 years ago)
- Founder: Life Insurance Corporation of India
- Headquarters: Mumbai, India
- Area served: India
- Key people: Tribhuwan Adhikary (MD & CEO)
- Products: Home loans and Mortgage loans
- Revenue: ▲₹20,005 crore (US$2.1 billion)(2023)
- Operating income: ▼₹16,963 crore (US$1.8 billion)(2023)
- Net income: ▼₹2,286 crore (US$240 million)(2023)
- Total assets: ▲₹254,687 crore (US$26 billion) (2023)
- Total equity: ▲₹24,751 crore (US$2.6 billion) (2023)
- Number of employees: 2,103
- Parent: Life Insurance Corporation of India
- Subsidiaries: LIC HFL Care Homes Limited; LIC HFL Financial Services Limited; LIC HFL Asset Management Company Private Limited
- Website: lichousing.com

LIC Housing Finance Limited (LIC HFL) is the largest housing finance company in India, with a registered corporate office in Mumbai. It is a deposit-taking housing finance company, and it is a subsidiary of Life Insurance Corporation (LIC), mostly providing long-term financing to people who purchase or construct residential houses or flats. It also finances the repair and renovation of existing residences and gives loans to businesses to purchase or construct clinics, nursing homes, diagnostic centres, office space, or equipment.

== History ==
The company was incorporated on 19 June 1989, under the Companies Act, 1956. It was promoted by Life Insurance Corporation of India and went public in the year 1994. The equity shares listed on the Bombay Stock Exchange under the security code 500253 and the National Stock Exchange of India. The maiden global depository receipt (GDR) issue was launched in 2004. Its GDRs listed on the Luxembourg Stock Exchange. The company is registered with National Housing Bank.

== Operations ==
In FY-2019, it had 9 regional offices, 24 back offices, and 282 marketing Offices across India. It also has 2 foreign offices in Kuwait and Dubai to cater to the Non-Resident Indians in the Persian Gulf countries, covering the residents of Bahrain, Dubai, Kuwait, Qatar, and Saudi Arabia. It has more than 450 centres across India. The company also has more than 12000 marketing intermediaries or agents to guide through the loan processes. It also has an online home loan approval facility through its website.

== Shareholders ==
As of 31 March 2016, 48.49% of the equity shares of the company were owned by LIC. The Foreign Institutional Investors (FIIs) held approx. 32% of the shares. Around 158,000 individual public shareholders own approximately 9% of its shares. The remaining 18% of the shares are owned by others.

Shareholders (as on 31 March 2016)	Shareholding
Promoter (LIC)	40.31%
Foreign Institutional Investors (FII)	32.45%
Mutual Funds	10.12%
Individual shareholders	9.32%
Bodies Corporate	3.47%
Insurance companies	2.08%
GDRs	0.16%
Others	2.09%

== See also ==
- Subhash Chandra–LIC Housing Finance loan fraud case
