= The Oriental Insurance Company =

Indian public-sector insurer private ltd

The Oriental Insurance Company Limited
- Type: Central Public Sector Undertaking
- Industry: Insurance
- Founded: 12 September 1947; 79 years ago in Mumbai, India
- Headquarters: New Delhi, India
- Key people: Sh. Sanjay Joshi (Chairman & MD); Ms Yogita Arora (Appointed Actuary)
- Products: General insurance; Vehicle insurance; Health insurance; Marine insurance; Property insurance; Crop insurance; Aviation insurance; Fidelity bond
- Revenue: ▲₹20,140 crore (US$2.2 billion) (2026)
- Operating income: ▼₹−2,115 crore (US$−230 million) (2026)
- Net income: ▼₹−3,420 crore (US$−370 million) (2026)
- Total assets: ▲₹38,950 crore (US$4.2 billion) (2026)
- Total equity: ▼₹−1,860 crore (US$−200 million) (2026)
- Owner: Government of India
- Number of employees: 5,900+ (2026)
- Website: orientalinsurance.org.in

The Oriental Insurance Company Ltd. (OICL) is an Indian public sector insurance company owned by the Government of India and administered by the Ministry of Finance. Incorporated in Mumbai on 12 September 1947, the company headquartered in New Delhi, the company has 25 regional offices and 969 operating offices nationwide. It also has branches in Nepal, Kuwait, and Dubai.

== History ==
OICL was incorporated at Mumbai on 12 September 1947. The company was a wholly owned subsidiary of The Oriental Government Security Life Assurance Company Ltd and was formed to carry out general insurance business. Following the nationalisation of the life insurance business and the formation of the Life Insurance Corporation of India under statutory law, the company became a subsidiary of the Life Insurance Corporation of India from 1956 to 1973 (until the general insurance business was nationalized in the country). Following the nationalisation of the general insurance industry by the General Insurance Business (Nationalisation) Act, 1972 (GIBNA), the Government of India transferred all the shares it held of the general insurance companies to the General Insurance Corporation of India (GIC). OICL became one of the four subsidiaries of GIC, with its headquarters in New Delhi.

With the General Insurance Business (Nationalisation) Amendment Act 2002 (40 of 2002) coming into force on March 21, 2003, GIC ceased to be a holding company of its subsidiaries. The ownership of the four erstwhile subsidiary companies and the General Insurance Corporation of India was vested with the Government of India. All company shares held by the GIC were transferred to the central government.

OICL made a modest beginning with a first-year premium of ₹99,946 (US$1,100) in 1950. The company's goal was “service to clients”, and achievement was helped by the strong traditions built up over time.

From less than a lakh at its inception, the gross premium figure stood at ₹15,993 crore (US$1.7 billion) in FY 2022–23.

== Subsidiaries and Joint Ventures ==
OICL also has two Joint Ventures/associate companies.

OICL has one wholly owned subsidiary, The Industrial Credit Company Limited, with a paid-up capital of ₹5 lakh (US$5,300).

OICL also holds a stake in the following companies:

- Health Insurance TPA of India Limited (Total Paid-up Share Capital: ₹120 crore (US$13 million) - Oriental's stake: 23.75%);
- India International Insurance Pte Ltd. Singapore (Total Paid-up Share Capital: S$5 crore (US$37.31 million) - Oriental's stake: 20%).

== See also ==
- Insurance in India
- General Insurance Corporation of India
- MEDISEP
