= Axis Mutual Fund =

Asset management company in India

- Type: Joint venture
- Industry: Investment management
- Founded: 2009; 17 years ago
- Headquarters: Mumbai, India
- Area served: India
- Key people: B.Gopkumar (MD & CEO); Shreyas Devalkar (head of equity)
- Products: Asset Management; Wealth Management
- AUM: ▲₹263,740 crore (US$27 billion) (December 2023)
- Owner: Axis Bank (75%); Schroders (25%)
- Website: www.axismf.com

Axis Mutual Fund is an Indian asset management company. It was established in the year 2009 and has its headquarters in Mumbai.

The firm offers various types of mutual fund schemes to invest in Indian equities and bonds and internationally.

== History ==
Axis Mutual Fund started its operations in 2009 with its first equity scheme, Axis Equity Fund.

In April 2012, Schroders, an asset management company, acquired a 25% stake in Axis Mutual Fund.

In September 2019, Axis Mutual Fund launched an index fund based on Nifty 100 that is known as Axis Nifty 100 Index fund. On 22 January 2020, the company launched ESG fund.

In May 2026, the firm suspended new subscriptions in three of its international funds.

== Securities and Exchange Board investigation ==
Two fund managers of Axis Mutual Fund allegedly shared confidential information about the asset manager's trades with brokers in Gujarat in return for kickbacks, according to a 2022 Securities and Exchange Board of India (SEBI) investigation into alleged front running. In 2023 and 2024, the firm's top management was replaced, including its chief executive officer, chief investment officer, and chief business officer, in the hopes of restoring investor confidence.

== See also ==
- Mutual funds in India
- Axis Bank
