= National Insurance Company =

Public Sector General Insurance Company in India

National Insurance Company Ltd.

- Headquarters in New Town, West Bengal
- Type: Central Public Sector Undertaking
- Industry: Insurance
- Founded: 5 December 1906; 119 years ago 1972; 54 years ago (as subsidiary of GIC) 7 August 2002; 24 years ago (public sector insurer)
- Founder: Gordhan Das Dutia
- Headquarters: New Town, Kolkata, India
- Area served: India; Nepal
- Key people: Rajeshwari Singh Muni (Chairman & MD)
- Products: General insurance; Health insurance; Vehicle insurance; Marine insurance; Property insurance; Crop insurance; Aviation insurance; Fidelity bond
- Revenue: ▲₹17,734.98 crore (US$1.9 billion) (2026)
- Operating income: ▼₹−855.31 crore (US$−91 million) (2026)
- Net income: ▼₹−2,533.71 crore (US$−270 million) (2026)
- Total assets: ▼₹40,980.08 crore (US$4.4 billion) (2026)
- Total equity: ▼₹−4,067.73 crore (US$−430 million) (2026)
- Owner: Government of India
- Number of employees: 6,911 (2025-26)
- Rating: CRISIL A+/Negative; [ICRA] A+/Stable
- Website: nationalinsurance.nic.co.in

National Insurance Company Ltd. (NICL) is an Indian public sector insurance company based in New Town, Kolkata and owned by the Government of India and administered by the Ministry of Finance. Established in 1906 by Gordhandas Dutia and Jeevan Das Dutia. National Insurance Company and Asian Insurance company was nationalised in 1972. Its portfolio consists of a multitude of general insurance policies, offered to a wide arena of clients encompassing different sectors of the economy. Apart from being a leading insurance provider in India, NICL also serves in Nepal.

== History ==
After nationalisation in 1972, NICL operated as a subsidiary of General Insurance Corporation of India (GIC). National Insurance Company Ltd. was spun off as a distinct company under the General Insurance Business (Nationalisation) Amendment Act in 2002. In April 2004, NIC signed an agreement with Nainital Bank for distribution of its general insurance products through the bank's branches in Uttarakhand, Haryana and New Delhi.

== Company profile ==
National Insurance Company Ltd. was incorporated on 5 December 1906 with its registered office in Kolkata. Consequent to passing of the General Insurance Business Nationalisation Act in 1972, 21 Foreign and 11 Indian Companies were merged with it and National became a subsidiary of General Insurance Corporation of India (GIC) which is fully owned by the Government of India. After the notification of the General Insurance Business and its India's largest General Insurance Company(Nationalisation) Amendment Act, on 7 August 2002, National has been de-linked from its holding company GIC and presently operates as an independent insurance company wholly owned by Govt of India. National Insurance Company Ltd (NIC) is one of the public sector insurance companies of India. It transacts a non-life insurance business. Headquartered in Kolkata, NIC's network of about 2000 offices is spread over the country. NIC's foreign operations are carried out from its branch offices in Nepal.

The paid-up share capital of National is ₹100 crores. Starting off with a premium base of ₹50 crores in 1974, NIC's gross direct premium income has steadily grown to about ₹16,766 crores rupees in the financial year 2024–25. National transacts general insurance business of Fire, Marine and Miscellaneous insurance. As of 2010, NICL has a AAA rating from Indian rating agency, CRISIL, a subsidiary of Standard and Poor's Company.

The gross premiums from underwriting by the company grew by 32.22% to over ₹6100 crore during the Financial Year 2010–2011. And Gross Premium grew up to 10,000 crore during the financial year 2013–2014. With this, the company was ranked second among general insurance companies operating in India, behind New India Assurance, at the end of the 2014 Financial Year. With about 2000 offices and approximately 11,000 employees and many more agents, the company operates in all of India, and neighbouring Nepal. In 2008, the company signed a deal with HCL Technologies worth almost ₹400 crore to outsource the company's information technology requirements over 7 years. On the 2nd of February 2018, the Government of India announced the merger of National Insurance Company with United India Insurance Company and Oriental Insurance.

NIC received the Economic Times iconic brand award in 2018.
