= Shikha Sharma =

Indian economist and banker (born 1958)

- Born: 19 November 1958 (age 67); India
- Education: Lady Shri Ram College; Indian Institute of Management Ahmedabad (1978 – 1980)
- Occupation: Banker
- Title: MD and CEO, Axis Bank
- Term: 2009-2018
- Predecessor: P. J. Nayak
- Successor: Amitabh Chaudhry
- Board member of: Piramal Enterprises; Tata Consumer Products; Ambuja Cements; Mahindra & Mahindra; Dr. Reddy's Laboratories
- Spouse: Sanjaya Sharma
- Children: 2

Shikha Sharma (born 19 November 1958) is an Indian economist and banker. She was the managing director and CEO of Axis Bank from 2009 to 2018. She also worked for nearly thirty years at the ICICI Group, across its bank and insurance companies.

== Early life and education ==
Shikha Sharma was born on 19 November 1958. Her father served in the Indian Army, reaching the rank of brigadier in the ordnance corps and fought in the 1965 and 1971 Indo-Pakistani wars. Due to his military service, Shikha grew up across the country, attending seven schools in as many cities. She graduated from the Loreto Convent School in Delhi.

Despite an interest in studying physics, she graduated with a BA (Honours) in Economics from the Lady Shri Ram College in Delhi and an MBA from Indian Institute of Management Ahmedabad. She also earned a post-graduate diploma in Software Technology from the National Centre for Software Technology in Bombay.

== Career ==
=== ICICI Group ===
After graduating from IIM Ahmedabad, Shikha Sharma joined ICICI Ltd. in 1980. During her 29-year tenure with the group, she worked with K. V. Kamath and former Prudential plc CEO Mark Tucker.

She was instrumental in setting up ICICI Securities – a joint venture between ICICI and J.P. Morgan, besides setting up various group businesses for ICICI, including investment banking and retail finance. She also launched a "micro-insurance" product that offered life insurance at just $1 a month. She served as the managing director and CEO of ICICI Personal Financial Services from May 1998 to December 2000; and as the managing director and CEO of the ICICI Prudential Life Insurance Company from December 2000 to June 2009.

Sharma and Chanda Kochhar were contenders to succeed K. V. Kamath as the CEO and managing director of ICICI Bank in 2009. One month after Kochhar's appointment as CEO, Sharma quit ICICI Bank to lead Axis Bank after being headhunted by Egon Zehnder. In a 2014 interview with Tamal Bandyopadhyay, she described her relationship with Kochhar as "We were not friends but had healthy respect for each other."

=== Axis Bank ===
Sharma's appointment as managing director and CEO for a five-year term was confirmed by shareholders on 1 June 2009 with immediate effect. She succeeded P. J. Nayak as its chairman and CEO. She strengthened Axis Bank's retail banking division, allowing it to be relatively insulated from the economic downturn, and moving away from being predominantly being a corporate lender. In June 2009, she stated the "Vision 2015" strategy for the bank, focusing growing retail banking to "balance the corporate business." The share retail loans to 46% of the bank's total books during her tenure, from 21% in June 2009.

In November 2010, Axis Bank announced the acquisition investment bank Enam Security in an all-stock deal valued ₹2,067 crore (equivalent to ₹46 billion or US$480 million in 2023). The bank's stock lost 5% the following date as analysts evaluated the deal to be overpriced. In April 2012, Axis Bank announced the closure of the deal after cutting the value to one-third to "reflect market conditions." The bank also announced that it had reached an agreement with Schroder Singapore Holdings, a subsidiary of Schroders to sell a 25 per cent stake in its mutual fund subsidiary Axis Asset Management Co. Ltd. (Axis AMC). In 2011, Axis Bank UK was incorporated as a subsidiary of the bank.

She received a salary hike of 10 per cent in June 2013, with a basic pay of ₹1.96 crore (equivalent to ₹3.3 crore or US$350,000 in 2023). Axis Bank stock had gained over 90% since her appointment in June 2009. The bank's compounded annual net profit growth rate was above 20 per cent in the three years ending 2014–15. The bank's net non-performing asset ratio was 1.34 per cent in March 2015, much lower than the 4.4 per cent for the banking sector as a whole. Net profit in 2015-16 rose 18.3 per cent to ₹7,358 crore (equivalent to ₹110 billion or US$1.1 billion in 2023), operating profit was up 24 per cent to ₹3,582 crore (equivalent to ₹51 billion or US$530 million in 2023), while net interest income grew 19 per cent to ₹14,224 crore (equivalent to ₹200 billion or US$2.1 billion in 2023). Advances grew 22 per cent and deposits were up 15 per cent during the year, both higher than the industry. The share of low-cost current account savings account (CASA) deposits remained stable at 45 per cent, a high ratio. In February 2016, Axis Bank continued its international expansion and opened a representative office in Dhaka.

Axis Bank was ranked among the best companies to work for in a 2013 survey by Business Today. Harvard Business Review published a case study on the bank titled 'Managing Change at Axis Bank' on 28 March 2014. In 2014, Axis Bank was awarded the "Bank of the Year in India" by The Banker. The citation noted that the bank had a "20% growth in profit after tax during the 2014 financial year while hitting $1bn profit after tax for the first time in its history" despite a liquidity crunch in India. In 2015, the bank was awarded a "Certificate of Recognition for excellence in Corporate Governance" from the Institute of Company Secretaries of India. It was also ranked the "Most Trusted Private Sector Bank" for the second year in a row in a 2015 survey conducted by The Economic Times.

Gross NPAs steadily grew under her tenure, from 0.96% in March 2009 to 5.28% in March 2017 to 6.77% in March 2018. Axis Bank was twice pulled up by the Reserve Bank of India, in 2016 and 2017, for under-reporting bad loans. In 2016, there was a reported difference of ₹9,480 crore (equivalent to ₹140 billion or US$1.4 billion in 2023) between Axis Bank and the RBI's assessments. In 2017, the reported divergence stood at ₹5,633 crore (equivalent to ₹79 billion or US$820 million in 2023). In April 2016, Axis Bank reported its first loss in 46 quarters. Earnings remained below analyst expectations through to December 2017. Axis Bank stock lost over 7% in value from 2014 to 2017. In 2014, Sharma had refuted the allegations that the bank had been "hiding" its bad loans, saying that the Institute of Chartered Accountants of India had awarded the bank for its excellent financial reporting the previous three years but conceded that the bank's high exposure to infrastructure projects had given analysts a "legitimate worry."

In November 2016, in the aftermath of the 2016 Indian banknote demonetisation, 19 Axis Bank employees were suspended by violating banks norms and alleged money laundering after a series of Income Tax Department raids at several branches. The RBI stepped in quell rumours that the bank would lose its banking license. Sharma announced in December that the bank had hired KPMG to conduct a forensic audit and vowed to "enhance due diligence and build more safeguards."

In July 2017, Axis Bank squashed rumours that Sharma would be joining the Tata Group and announced a three-year extension to her term as CEO. In December 2017, the Securities and Exchange Board of India ordered the bank to investigate allegations of insider trading against its officers after reports that earnings statements were being shared on WhatsApp before they had been reported to exchanges.

Axis Bank notified the National Stock Exchange of India on 9 April 2018 that Sharma would retire as the managing director and CEO on 31 December 2018. The announcement came despite the bank's board approving a three-year extension of her term, due to start on 1 June 2018, amid reports that the RBI was unhappy with the bank's performance and was reviewing the decision to approve the extension. The bank's shares rose by 3.44% in the Bombay Stock Exchange after the announcement of her retirement. She was succeeded by Amitabh Chaudhry on 1 January 2019.

=== Other appointments ===
Piramal Enterprises announced on 1 April 2022 that it had appointed Shikha Sharma as a 'Non-Executive-Non-Independent Director' with effect from 31 March subject to approval by shareholders. Sharma also serves on the boards of Tata Consumer Products, Ambuja Cements, Mahindra & Mahindra and Dr. Reddy's Laboratories. She also serves as an advisor to Google Pay, NextBillion Technology, Bahaar Foundation and is a member of the board of governors of Indian Institute of Management Lucknow.

== Personal life ==
Shikha met and married her husband Sanjaya Sharma while they were students at IIM Ahmedabad in 1978. Sanjaya is the former CEO of Tata Interactive Systems. The couple have two children, Tilak and Tvisha. Sharma has two younger brothers who are cardiologists.

In February 2023, the couple sold their 4390 sq. ft apartment in The Imperial to 2015 Grover Family Trust for ₹32.25 crore (US$3.3 million).

== Awards and recognition ==
- "Best Domestic Bank in India" (2010) by Asset Triple A Country Awards
- 'Banker of the Year' for 2014–15 by Business Standard
- AIMA - J. R. D. Tata Corporate Leadership Award for the Year 2014
- 'India's Best Woman CEO' by Business Today – 2013
- 'Transformational Business Leader of the Year' at AIMA's Managing India Awards – 2012
- Woman Leader of the year' at Bloomberg - UTV Financial Leadership Awards – 2012
- Businessworld Banker of the Year Award – 2012
- Forbes List of Asia's 50 Power Business Women – 2012
- Indian Express Most Powerful Indians – 2012
- India Today Power List of 25 Most Influential Women – 2012
- Finance Asia's Top 20 Women in Finance – 2011
- Business Today 'Hall of Fame' – 2011
- Fortune Global and India list of 50 Most Powerful Women in Business – 2011
- Businesswoman of the Year at the Economic Times Awards – 2008
- Entrepreneur of the Year – Manager at the E&Y Entrepreneur Awards – 2007
- Outstanding Businesswoman of the Year, CNBC TV 18's Business Leader Awards
