= Amitabh Chaudhry =

Indian banker

- Born: 1964 (age 61–62)
- Education: Birla Institute of Technology and Science, Pilani; Indian Institute of Management Ahmedabad
- Occupation: Banker
- Title: MD and CEO, Axis Bank
- Term: 2019-till date
- Predecessor: Shikha Sharma

Amitabh Chaudhry is an Indian businessman, and the managing director (MD) and chief executive officer (CEO) of Axis Bank, the third largest private sector bank in India. He joined Axis in January 2019, after heading HDFC Life Insurance for nine years.

== Education ==
Chaudhry is an engineer from Birla Institute of Technology and Science, Pilani, and pursued post graduation in business management from Indian Institute of Management Ahmedabad.

== Career ==
Prior to HDFC Life, Chaudhry was the MD and CEO of Infosys BPO and the Head of testing unit of Infosys Technologies Ltd. Chaudhry began his career with Bank of America in 1987 and undertook diverse roles such as Head of Technology Investment Banking for Asia, Regional Finance Head for Wholesale Banking and Global Markets, and Chief Finance Officer of Bank of America (India). Later, he moved to Crédit Lyonnais Securities in 2001 as the Head of Investment Banking franchise for South East Asia.
