= General Insurance Corporation of India =

Indian public sector Insurance company limited

General Insurance Corporation
- Type: Public
- Traded as: BSE: 540755; NSE: GICRE
- Industry: Insurance
- Founded: 22 November 1972; 53 years ago
- Headquarters: Mumbai, Maharashtra, India
- Number of locations: Dubai, Kuala Lumpur, London, Moscow
- Area served: Worldwide
- Key people: Ramaswamy Narayanan (Chairman-and-Managing Director effective October 1, 2023)
- Services: Reinsurance
- Revenue: ▲₹47,751 crore (US$5.0 billion) (2023)
- Operating income: ▲₹8,040 crore (US$830 million) (2023)
- Net income: ▲₹6,907 crore (US$720 million) (2023)
- Total assets: ▲₹162,731 crore (US$17 billion) (2023)
- Owner: Government of India (85.78%)
- Number of employees: 449 as on 31 March 2023
- Subsidiaries: GIC Re South Africa Ltd (100%)
- Website: www.gicre.in

General Insurance Corporation, (abbreviated as GIC), is an Indian public sector reinsurance company, headquarters in Mumbai, India. It was incorporated on November 22, 1972, under the Companies Act, 1956. It was the sole nationalised reinsurance company in the Indian insurance market until the insurance market was open to foreign reinsurance players by late 2016 including companies from Germany, Switzerland and France. GIC Re's shares are listed on BSE Limited and National Stock Exchange of India Ltd.

== Making of GIC ==
The business of general insurance was nationalised through The General Insurance (Emergency) Provisions Ordinance promulgated on 13 May 1971 and thereby the business being carried on by 107 entities was consolidated and restructured into four companies namely The New India Assurance Company Limited, Bombay, United India Fire & General Insurance Company Limited, Madras, Oriental Fire & General Insurance Company Limited, Bombay and National Insurance Company Limited, Calcutta (New India Assurance Co. Ltd., United India Insurance Co. Ltd., The Oriental Insurance Co. Ltd., and National Insurance Company Co. Ltd. respectively).

The General Insurance Business (Nationalisation) Act, 1972 (GIBNA) that followed paved the way for the Government to take over ownership of these businesses. Accordingly, GIC was incorporated on 22 November 1972 as a private company under Companies Act, 1956 in Bombay and received its Certificate for Commencement of Business on 1 January 1973.

GIC's stated role was to function as the holding company of the four companies, and superintend, control and carry on the business of General insurance on behalf of the Government of India.

The first Chairman of GIC was A Rajagopalan, an Actuary and an officer of the Indian Administrative Service (IAS). M K Venkateshan and S K Desai were appointed the two Managing Directors of GIC.

On 1 January 1973, GIC was notified as the reinsurer under Section 101 A of Insurance Act, 1938, making it the Indian reinsurer for receiving obligatory cessions, a role hitherto played by two companies called India Reinsurance Corporation Limited (India Re) and Indian Guarantee and General Insurance Company Limited (Indian Guarantee).

GIC was reborn as a pure reinsurance company in November, 2000. It was re-notified as 'Indian reinsurer' under Insurance Act, 1938 and continued to receive obligatory cessions from direct insurers. It continued writing foreign inward reinsurance business purely on its own account from 1 April 2002.

With effect from 21 March 2003, its four subsidiaries (NICL, United India Insurance, Oriental Insurance and New India Assurance) were delinked from GIC by an administrative order from the Ministry of Finance and became directly owned by the Government.

Retaining its name, the company rebranded itself as "GIC Re" to denote its new identity.

Hitesh Rameshchandra Joshi has been officially re-appointed as the regular Chairman-cum-Managing Director (CMD) of GIC, effective June 16, 2026

== Operations ==
All direct general insurance companies of India are required by law to cede a mandatory percentage of every policy value to GIC Re subject to some limitations and exceptions. This percentage of cession is decided by the IRDAI on an annual basis.

In April 2020, GIC Re's Operations in Brazil got status upgrade from 'occasional reinsurer' to 'admitted reinsurer' by the Brazilian Superintendence of Private Insurance (SUSEP). It was published in the Brazilian Gazette on 14 April 2020.

== Motto & Logo ==
On 26 August 1976, Chairman A Rajagopalan in GIC's Board Minutes signed and approved the motto of GIC Re, Ãpatkãle Rakshisyãmi. It a Sanskrit phrase that translates into, "I shall protect you in times of distress." In 1980s, GIC's logo was modified and the motto was incorporated in Devanagari Script.

== Subsidiaries ==
- GIC Re South Africa Ltd
- GIC Perestrakhovanie LLC, Russia
- GIC Re, India, Corporate Member Ltd
