= Insurance in India =

Insurance in India is provided by both public and private-sector companies. India's Constitution lists it under the Union List, meaning only the central government can legislate on it. Since 1999, the Insurance Regulatory and Development Authority of India (IRDAI) has regulated the sector. The insurance sector has gone through several phases, allowing private companies to solicit insurance and also permitting foreign direct investment (FDI) in Indian insurance companies. India allowed private companies in the sector in 2000, setting a limit of 26% on FDI; it was increased to 49% in 2014, 74% in May 2021, and 100% in December 2025.

The insurance sector was partly nationalized in 1956 with the creation of the Life Insurance Corporation of India, making it unlawful for private companies to offer life insurance products. Later in 1972, the general insurance business was nationalized through the General Insurance Business (Nationalisation) Act, 1972. The Act nationalised all private companies in the general insurance business in India: 55 domestic companies and 52 foreign companies. The 107 acquired companies were merged into four separate companies.

Most Indians are uninsured or underinsured. Insurance penetration in India was 3.7% in 2023-24, falling from a peak of 4.2% in 2021 following the COVID-19 pandemic; life insurance penetration was 2.7% in 2024-25. 40 crore people in India lack any form of health insurance. IRDAI has announced its vision of 'Insurance for All by 2047'.

== Recent developments ==
The most significant reform in India's insurance sector since it opened to private participation in early 2000s happened in December 2025 through the Sabka Bima Sabki Raksha (Amendment of Insurance Laws) Act, 2025. The Act increased FDI limits in the sector to 100% from 74%, and lowered the net owned fund requirements for foreign reinsurers to ₹1,000 crore (equivalent to ₹10 billion or US$110 million in 2026) from ₹5,000 crore (equivalent to ₹52 billion or US$550 million in 2026), among other relaxations.

== Insurance penetration ==
Insurance penetration in India is low at 3.7% of GDP for all types of insurance, including non-life insurance at 1% and life insurance at 2.7%, against the global average of 7.3% of GDP. 40 crore people in India lack any form of health insurance. IRDAI has announced its vision of 'Insurance for All by 2047'.

== Industry structure ==
By 2020, the Indian Insurance industry was US$280 billion. However, only 500 million people (of the total population of 1.42 billion) have health insurance. As more private companies enter the sector, this coverage is expected to grow further. Several government schemes offer insurance coverage to the people.

== Legal structure ==
The Insurance Act of 1938 was the first legislation governing all forms of insurance and provided strict state control over the insurance business. Life insurance in India was completely nationalised on 19 January 1956, through the Life Insurance Corporation Act. All 245 insurance companies operating in India at that time were merged into one entity, the Life Insurance Corporation of India. The general insurance business was nationalised in 1972 by forceful acquisition of 107 domestic and foreign companies providing insurance services in India.

Before the 1938 Act, the industry operated under the provisions of the Indian Contract Act, 1872.

=== Authorities ===
The primary regulator for insurance in India is the Insurance Regulatory and Development Authority of India, which was established in 1999 through the Insurance Regulatory and Development Authority Act, 1999.

== See also ==
- List of insurance companies in India
- Life insurance in India
- Agricultural insurance in India
- Rashtriya Swasthya Bima Yojana
- Aam Aadmi Bima Yojana
- Pradhan Mantri Suraksha Bima Yojana
- Licentiate (Insurance)
