= National Highways Authority =

National Highways Authority may refer to:

- National Highways Authority of India
- National Highway Authority (Pakistan)
