= MEDISEP =

Health insurance scheme from theGovernment of Kerala

Medical Insurance Scheme for State Employees and Pensioners (abbr. MEDISEP) is an insurance scheme launched by the Government of Kerala to provide comprehensive health insurance coverage to all serving State Government employees and pensioners. The beneficiaries include newly recruited employees and their family, part time employees, all staff of aided schools and colleges and their family, pensioners and their spouses and family pensioners.

The scheme was formally inaugurated by the Chief Minister of Kerala on 1 July 2022. Within six months of its launch, the scheme attracted more than a total of 2.9 million beneficiaries and dependents and a participation of 480 hospitals most of which are located within Kerala. The scheme is envisaged to provide cashless medical assistance with a comprehensive coverage up to ₹3 lakhs per year. The annual premium is ₹4,800 plus 18 per cent GST for the policy period of 2022–24. A monthly premium of ₹500 is being deducted from the salary of June 2022 and pension of July 2022 onward. MEDISEP is being implemented through The Oriental Insurance Company, a public sector insurance company.
