= Life Insurance Corporation =

Indian public sector life insurer

Life Insurance Corporation of India
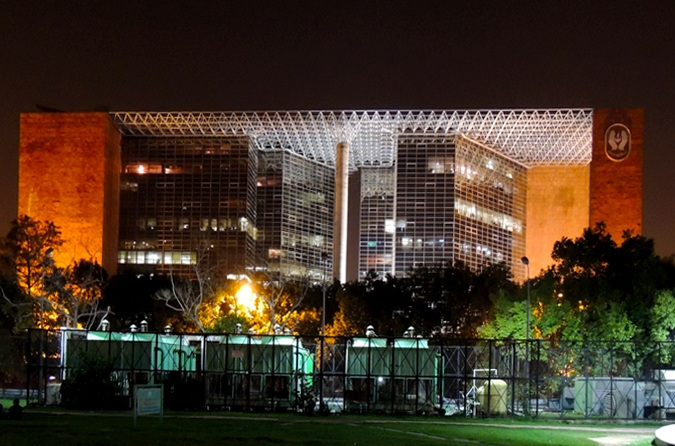
- LIC New Delhi
- Type: Public
- Traded as: BSE: 543526; NSE: LICI
- Industry: Financial services
- Founded: 1 September 1956 (70 years ago)
- Headquarters: Mumbai, Maharashtra, India
- Key people: R. Doraiswamy (CEO & MD); Ratnakar Patnaik (MD); Dinesh Pant (MD)
- Products: Life insurance; Health insurance; Pensions; Mutual funds; Mortgage loans
- Services: Investment management; Asset management
- Revenue: ▲₹9.94 lakh crore (US$100 billion) (2026)
- Operating income: ▲₹64,280 crore (US$6.7 billion) (2026)
- Net income: ▲₹57,419 crore (US$6.0 billion) (2026)
- Total assets: ▲₹57.29 lakh crore (US$590 billion) (2026)
- Total equity: ▲₹1.76 lakh crore (US$18 billion) (2026)
- Owner: Government of India (96.5%)
- Number of employees: 84,565 (2026)
- Subsidiaries: LIC Pension Fund Ltd.; LIC Mutual Fund; LIC Cards Services Ltd.; LIC Housing Finance
- Website: licindia.in
- Footnotes; Financials as of 31 March 2025.

The Life Insurance Corporation of India (LIC) is an Indian public sector life insurance company headquartered in Mumbai, Maharashtra, India. It is India's largest insurance company and its largest institutional investor with total assets under management worth ₹57.29 lakh crore (equivalent to ₹61 trillion or US$630 billion in 2026) as of May 2026. It is under the ownership of Government of India and administrative control of the Ministry of Finance.

The Life Insurance Corporation of India was established on 1 September 1956, when the Parliament of India passed the Life Insurance of India Act, nationalising the insurance industry in India. Over 245 insurance companies and provident societies were merged.

LIC reported 290 million policyholders as of 2019, a total life fund of ₹28.3 lakh crore (US$401.87 billion). The company also reported having settled 26 million claims in 2018–19. It ranked 98th on the 2022 Fortune Global 500 list with a revenue of ₹775,283 crore (US$98.63 billion) and a profit of ₹4,415 crore (US$561.67 million).

In 2026, LIC paid a dividend of Rs. 12,207.25 crore dividend to the Government of India.

== History ==
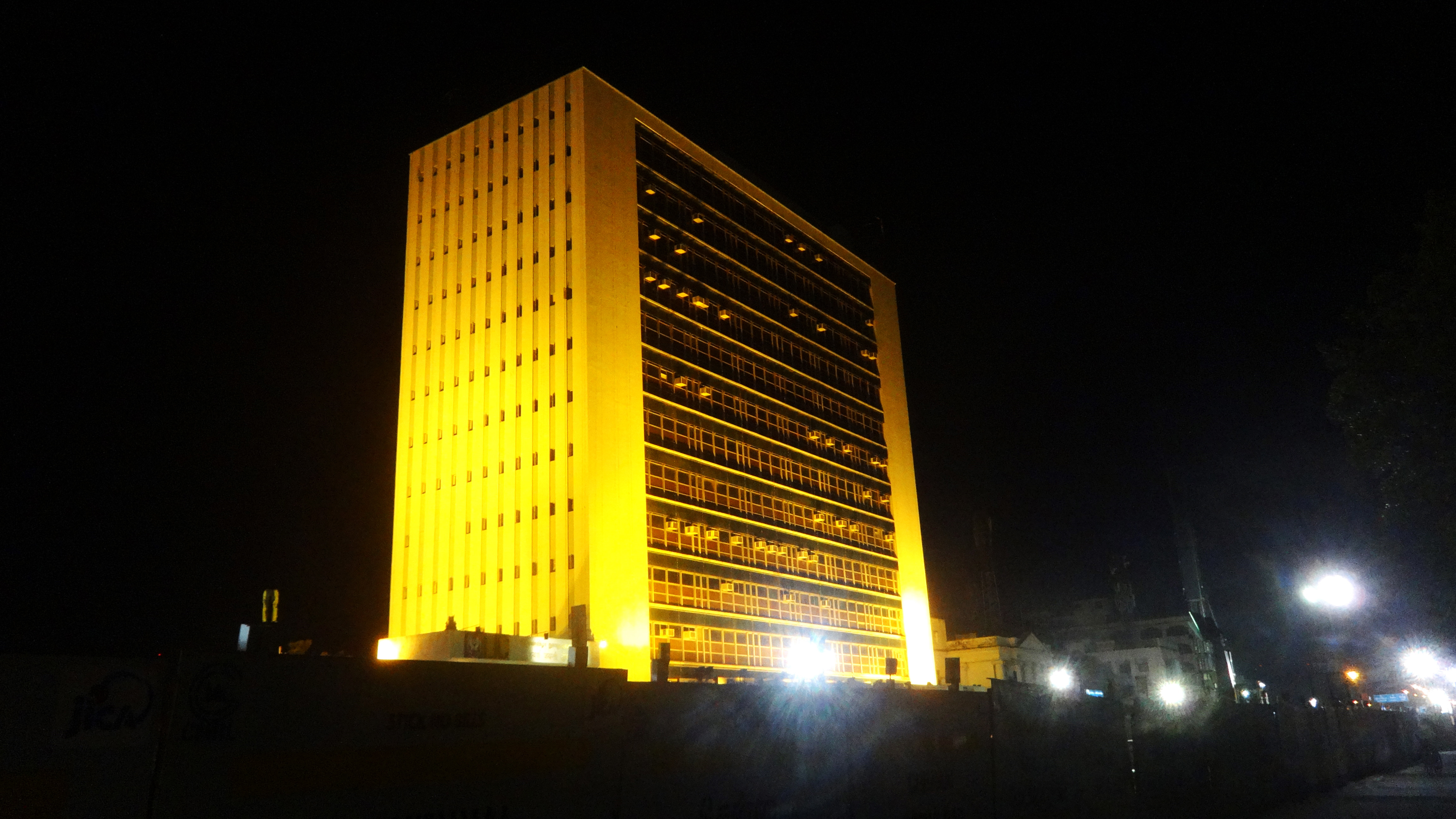
LIC Building at Chennai, was the tallest building in India when it was inaugurated in 1959

=== Founding organisations ===
The Oriental Life Insurance Company, the first company in India to offer life insurance coverage, was established in Kolkata in 1818 by Bipin Das Gupta. Its primary target market was India.

Surendranath Tagore had founded Hindustan Insurance Society around the same time, which later became the Life Insurance Corporation.

The Bombay Mutual Life Assurance Society was formed in 1870, almost half a century later. It was the first native insurance provider of Western India. Other insurance companies established in the pre-independence era include:

- Postal Life Insurance (PLI) was introduced on 1 February 1884
- Bharat Insurance Company (1896)
- United India (1906)
- National Indian (1906)
- National Insurance (1906)
- Co-operative Assurance (1906)
- Hindustan Co-operatives (1907)
- The New India Assurance Co Ltd (1919)
- Indian Mercantile
- General Assurance
- Swadeshi Life (later Bombay Life)
- Sahyadri Insurance (Merged into LIC, 1986)

These companies were established when India was marked mostly by turbulent economic and political conditions including the Indian rebellion of 1857, World War I and World War II. The effect of these events led to a high liquidation rate of life insurance companies in India and adversely affected the faith of the public in the value of obtaining life insurance.

=== Nationalisation in 1956 ===
In January 1956, LIC was nationalised in two stages: initially, the company's management was taken over by the government by an ordinance in January, and then the Parliament of India enacted the Life Insurance Corporation of India Act, 1956. In 1960, a foreign branch was established in the United Kingdom.

The corporation obtained a certification of registration from the IRDAI to undertake life insurance business, and was renewed under article 3A of the Insurance Act.

=== Post-Nationalisation Measures ===
In 1981, the corporation implemented a reorganisation policy to give effect to operations decentralisation and proper decision making. Jana Raksha Policy was formulated to cater to the rural masses. Installation of microprocessors was first initiated in October by the corporation and the recruitment under sports quota started. In 1987, the corporation introduced a group insurance called- LAGLI (Landless Agricultural Labourers Group Insurance). During this year, LICs prestigious Jeevan Bharati Building was inaugurated by the union minister N.D Tiwari. In 1989, an associate recognised LIC Housing Finance Limited was set up by the corporation. The Corporation established a mutual funds as a trust on 20 April 1989.

The RGLIS (Rural Group Life Insurance Scheme) was launched on 15 August 1995. On 1998, the first IVRS was inaugurated in Mumbai. Moreover, 150 touch screen based information kiosks were set up across the country, enabling customers to get information on policies, new plans and bonuses.

In 1999, LIC (International) EC extended its operations to Qatar. In 2000, they extended their operations to Nepal through a subsidiary, Life Insurance Corporation. In 2001, the first unit linked insurance plan, BIMA Plus was launched. LIC signed its first strategic alliance with Corporation bank that year as well.

=== Initial public offering ===
Finance Minister Nirmala Sitharaman announced a proposal for an initial public offering (IPO) for the Life Insurance Corporation of India (LIC) in the 2021 Union budget of India. In 2021, the Indian government also proposed to enhance LIC's authorised capital to ₹25,000 crore (US$3.38 billion) to facilitate its public listing.

The LIC IPO opened to the public on 4 May 2022, and concluded on 9 May 2022. The Government of India aimed to raise ₹21,000 crore through the IPO, which was significantly lower than the initially expected ₹65,000 to ₹70,000 crore by diluting a 5% equity stake. Instead, the IPO offered a 3.5% stake, valuing the company at approximately ₹6 lakh crore. The company's market value increased by $30 billion over two years after listing.

As of December 2024, LIC's listed holdings were valued at approximately $177 billion. By February 18, 2025, they declined to $166.5 billion, reflecting a 5.7% mark-to-market loss of $10.1 billion. In May 2026, LIC shareholders approved a 1:1 bonus share issue, under which eligible shareholders would receive one additional share for every existing share held. It is the first bonus issue announced by the company after listing. In January 2026, Citi recommended LIC shares with a target price of ₹1,345, implying a potential upside of 66.16% from the prevailing market price.

== Structure ==
The Central Office of LIC is based out of Mumbai. There are a total of 8 zonal offices, located in Delhi, Chennai, Mumbai, Hyderabad, Kanpur, Kolkata, Bhopal and Patna.

=== Liberalisation post 2000s ===
In August 2000, the Indian Government embarked on a program to liberalise the insurance sector and opened it up to the private sector. The LIC benefited from this process and in 2013 reported that the first year premium compound annual growth rate (CAGR) was 24.53% while total life premium CAGR was 19.28%, matching the growth of the life insurance industry and outperforming general economic growth.

=== Employees ===
A scheme of incentive bonus to development officers came into existence. In 1980, the corporation began to recruit development officers and the NIA sponsored jointly with GIC and its subsidiaries were founded.

== Golden Jubilee Foundation ==
The LIC Golden Jubilee Foundation was established in 2006 as a charity organisation. The entity has the aim of promoting education, alleviating poverty, and providing better living conditions for the underprivileged. The Golden Jubilee Scholarship award is one of the best known parts of the foundation. Each year, this award is given to the meritorious students in the 12th standard who wish to continue their studies, and have a parental income less than ₹2 lakh (US$2,100).

== Holdings ==
The LIC invests in sectors such as banks, cement, chemicals and fertilisers, electricity and transmission, electrical and electronics, engineering, construction and infrastructure, fast-moving consumer goods, finance and investments, healthcare, hotels, information technology, metals and mining, motor vehicles, and ancillaries, oil and natural resources, retail, textiles, transportation, and logistics.

== Other Information ==
- Yogakshema, an architectural landmark, is the corporate office of LIC, and was inaugurated by Pt. Jawaharlal Nehru.
- In 1970, a commemorative stamp and postcard was issues through Indian post offices and telegraphs, depicting the legacy of the firm.

== See also ==
- Insurance in India
- Insurance
- LIC Housing Finance
