= United India Insurance Company =

Indian public sector insurance company ltd

United India Insurance Co. Ltd.

- Headquarters in Chennai, Tamil Nadu
- Type: Central Public Sector Undertaking
- Industry: Insurance
- Founded: 18 February 1938; 88 years ago
- Headquarters: 24 Whites Road, Chennai, Tamil Nadu, India
- Area served: India
- Key people: Bhupesh Sushil Rahul (Chairman & MD)
- Products: General insurance; Vehicle insurance; Health insurance; Marine insurance; Property insurance; Crop insurance; Aviation insurance; Fidelity bond
- Revenue: ▲₹21,845 crore (US$2.3 billion) (2026)
- Operating income: ▼₹−520 crore (US$−56 million) (2026)
- Net income: ▼₹−1,460 crore (US$−160 million) (2026)
- Total assets: ▲₹42,110 crore (US$4.5 billion) (2026)
- Total equity: ▼₹2,980 crore (US$320 million) (2026)
- Owner: Government of India
- Number of employees: 8,850 (2026)
- Website: uiic.co.in/web/

United India Insurance Company Limited (UIICL) is an Indian public sector insurance company owned by the Government of India and administered by the Ministry of Finance. Headquartered in Chennai, Tamil Nadu, the company serves over 1.38 crore customers. Supported by a workforce of over 9000 employees, the company has 30 regional offices and 1537 operating offices nationwide. The company was incorporated on 18 February 1938 and nationalized in 1972.

== History ==
UIIC was incorporated on 18 February 1938 in Chennai. Following the nationalisation of the general insurance industry in terms of the provisions of the General Insurance Business (Nationalisation) Act, 1972 (GIBNA), 12 Indian insurance companies, four cooperative insurance societies, and the Indian operations of 5 foreign insurers, besides the general insurance operations of the southern region of Life Insurance Corporation of India were merged with UIIC. The Government of India transferred all the shares of the merged entity to the General Insurance Corporation of India (GIC). UIIC became one of the four subsidiaries of GIC.

With the General Insurance Business (Nationalisation) Amendment Act 2002 (40 of 2002) coming into force on March 21, 2003, GIC ceased to be a holding company of its subsidiaries. The ownership of the four erstwhile subsidiary companies and the General Insurance Corporation of India was vested with the Government of India. All company shares held by the GIC were transferred to the central government.

In June 2024, Bhupesh Sushil Rahul assumed office as the Chairman-cum-Managing Director (CMD) of United India Insurance Company.

== Operations ==
The company maintains a nationwide network consisting of 30 regional offices and 1,537 operating offices. Supported by a workforce of over 9,000 employees, the organization has served over 1.38 crore customer across India.

== Investigations ==
In March 2018, the CBI filed an FIR against two former UIIC officials for allegedly bypassing investment protocol to put ₹30 crore of company funds into defaulted DCHIL debentures in 2011.

== See also ==
- Insurance in India
- General Insurance Corporation of India
