= National Health Accounts =

The National Health Accounts is a process through which countries monitor the flow of money in their health sector. Looking at different perspective of health financing. The World Health Organization has been coordinating efforts at the global level to produce those estimates for each and every country.

== History ==
On the 1948 the World Health Organization (WHO) constitution was the Universal Health Coverage (UHC) firmly based. For the monitoring of the UHC it is essential to measure how health systems are financed. The measurement of the health systems are based on data generated by the National Health Accounts. National Health Accounts have been developed using the System of Health Accounts (SHA) defined by OECD. The SHA has been developed since 2000. National Health Accounts have been produced in most developing countries between 2002 and 2009. A new version of SHA has been released in 2011.

== Basic Structure ==
Every expenditure in the health system is classified according to characteristics. The three major categories are : Health Care Functions, Health Care Providers, Health Care Financing Schemes. Within each category, you find a number of subcategories.

Example of subcategories in Health Care Financing Schemes

=== Public expenses ===
- Tax
- Mandatory Health Insurance - Social
- Security- Earmarked taxes
- Public Donor funding

=== Private expenses ===
- Direct Household Expenses (OOP)
- Non Governmental Organisation
- Private insurance - Community Insurance
- Health expenses by companies
