= Aviation insurance =

Liability and equipment coverage for aircraft

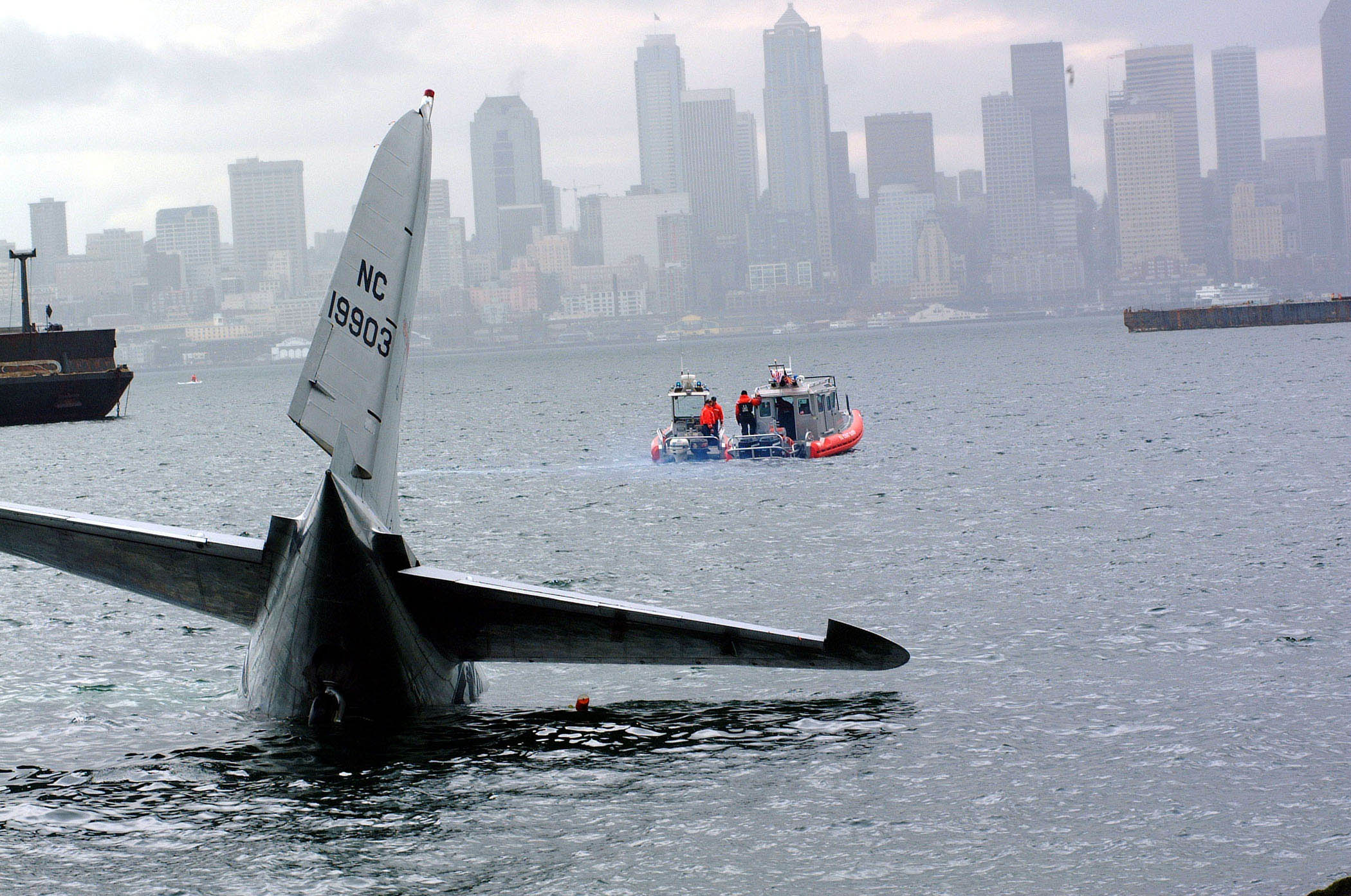
Aviation insurance provides coverage for hull losses as well as liability for passenger injuries, environmental and third-party damage caused by aircraft accidents.

Aviation insurance is insurance coverage geared specifically to the operation of aircraft and the risks involved in aviation. Aviation insurance policies are distinctly different from those for other areas of transportation and tend to incorporate aviation terminology, as well as terminology, limits and clauses specific to aviation insurance.

== History ==
Aviation Insurance was first introduced in the early years of the 20th century. The first-ever aviation insurance policy was written by Lloyd's of London in 1911. The company stopped writing aviation policies in 1912 after bad weather at an air meet caused crashes, and ultimately losses, on those first policies.

The first aviation policies were underwritten by the marine insurance underwriting community. The first specialist aviation insurers emerged in 1924.

In 1929, the Warsaw Convention was signed. The convention was an agreement to establish terms, conditions, and limitations of liability for carriage by air; this was the first recognition of the airline industry as we know it today.

"Aviation in itself is not inherently dangerous. But to an even greater degree than the sea, it is terribly unforgiving of any carelessness, incapacity or neglect." — Captain A. G. Lamplugh, chief underwriter and principal surveyor of British Aviation Insurance Company (1931)

Realising that there should be a specialist industry sector, the International Union of Marine Insurance (IUMI) first set up an aviation committee and later in 1934 created the International Union of Aviation Insurers (IUAI), made up of eight European aviation insurance companies and pools.

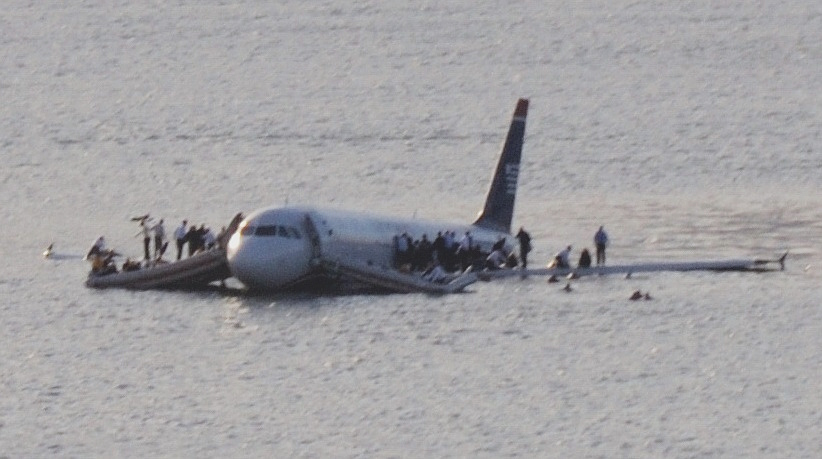
US Airways Flight 1549 was written off after ditching into the Hudson River

The London insurance market is still the largest single centre for aviation insurance. The market is made up of the traditional Lloyd's of London syndicates and numerous other traditional insurance markets. Throughout the rest of the world there are national markets established in various countries, each dependent on the aviation activity within each country. The United States has a large percentage of the world's general aviation fleet and has a large established market. According to the 2014 report from GAMA (General Aviation Manufacturers Association), there are 362,000 general aviation aircraft worldwide, and 199,000 (or roughly 55%) are based in the United States.

No single insurer has the resources to retain a risk the size of a major airline, or even a substantial proportion of such a risk. The catastrophic nature of aviation insurance can be measured in the number of losses that have cost insurers hundreds of millions of dollars (Aviation accidents and incidents).

Most airlines arrange "fleet policies" to cover all aircraft they own or operate.

== Types of insurance ==
Aviation insurance is divided into several types of insurance coverage available.

=== Public liability insurance ===
This coverage, often referred to as third party liability covers aircraft owners for damage that their aircraft does to third party property, such as houses, cars, crops, airport facilities and other aircraft struck in a collision. It does not provide coverage for damage to the insured aircraft itself or coverage for passengers injured on the insured aircraft. After an accident an insurance company will compensate victims for their losses, but if a settlement cannot be reached then the case is usually taken to court to decide liability and the amount of damages. Public liability insurance is mandatory in most countries and is usually purchased in specified total amounts per incident, such as $1,000,000 or $5,000,000.

=== Passenger liability insurance ===
Passenger liability protects passengers riding in the accident aircraft who are injured or killed. In many countries this coverage is mandatory only for commercial or large aircraft. Coverage is often sold on a "per-seat" basis, with a specified limit for each passenger seat.

=== Combined Single Limit (CSL) ===
CSL coverage combines public liability and passenger liability coverage into a single coverage with a single overall limit per accident. This type of coverage provides more flexibility in paying claims for liability, especially if passengers are injured, but little damage is done to third party property on the ground.

=== Ground risk hull insurance not in motion ===
This provides coverage for the insured aircraft against damage when it is on the ground and not in motion. This would provide protection for the aircraft for such events as fire, theft, vandalism, flood, mudslides, animal damage, wind or hailstorms, hangar collapse or for uninsured vehicles or aircraft striking the aircraft. The amount of coverage may be a blue book value or an agreed value that was set when the policy was purchased.

The use of the insurance term "hull" to refer to the insured aircraft betrays the origins of aviation insurance in marine insurance. Most hull insurance includes a deductible to discourage small or nuisance claims.

=== Ground risk hull insurance in motion (taxiing) ===
This coverage is similar to ground risk hull insurance not in motion, but provides coverage while the aircraft is taxiing, but not while taking off or landing. Normally, coverage ceases at the start of the take-off roll and is in force only once the aircraft has completed its subsequent landing. Due to disputes between aircraft owners and insurance companies about whether the accident aircraft was taxiing or attempting to take-off, this type of coverage has been discontinued by many insurance companies.

=== In-flight insurance ===
In-flight coverage protects an insured aircraft against damage during all phases of flight and ground operation, including while parked or stored. Naturally, it is more expensive than not-in-motion coverage, since most aircraft are damaged while in motion.
