= Fidelity bond =

Insurance against others' frauds

A fidelity bond or fidelity guarantee is a form of insurance protection that covers policyholders for losses that they incur as a result of fraudulent acts by specified individuals. It usually insures a business for losses caused by the dishonest acts of its employees.

While called bonds, these obligations to protect an employer from employee-dishonesty losses are really insurance policies. These insurance policies protect from losses of company monies, securities, and other property from employees who have a manifest intent to i) cause the company to sustain a loss and ii) obtain an improper financial benefit, either for themselves or another party. There are also many other coverage extensions available through the purchase of additional insuring agreements. These are common to most crime insurance policies (burglary, fire, general theft, computer theft, disappearance, fraud, forgery, etc.) and are designed to further protect specific company assets.

== First-party vs. third-party fidelity bonds ==
There are two types of fidelity bonds: first-party and third-party. First-party fidelity bonds protect businesses against intentionally wrongful acts (fraud, theft, forgery, etc.) committed by employees of that business. Third-party fidelity bonds protect businesses against intentionally wrongful acts committed by people working for them on a contract basis (e.g., consultants or independent contractors).

In business partnerships, it is the responsibility of the business working as a contractor or subcontractor to carry third-party fidelity bond coverage, though it is typically the other party who requests or requires such coverage. In many cases, businesses in finance or banking require their contractors to carry third-party fidelity bond coverage to prevent losses from theft.

== Commercial crime vs. financial institution bonds ==
The fidelity bond marketplace is, generally speaking, split into two main type of policies; financial institution bonds (to protect financial institutions such as banks, stock brokers, insurance companies etc.) and commercial crime policies (non-financial institutions). Within each category there are different policy forms designed for specific types of institutions. These include:

- Financial Institution Bonds, Standard Form No. 14 for Brokers/Dealers
- Financial Institution Bonds, Standard Form No. 15 for Mortgage Bankers and Finance Companies
- Credit Union Blanket Bond, Standard Form No. 23 for Credit Unions
- Financial Institution Bonds, Standard Form No. 24 for Commercial Banks, Savings Banks and Savings and Loan Associations
- Financial Institution Bonds, Standard Form No. 25 for Insurance Companies
- Commercial Crime Policy
- Commercial Crime Policy for Public Entities

== Emerging trends ==
Fidelity insurers need to not only understand the threat posed to companies from traditional elements such as employee dishonesty, robbery or cheque forgery, they need to stay informed of emerging trends or evolving threat vectors.

=== Social engineering fraud ===
Also known as business email compromise (BEC) or impersonation fraud (and by a variety of other names), social engineering fraud typically involves someone impersonating a person close to the insured company (an employee, an executive, a vendor or a client) and tricking the company into transferring funds to the fraudster. These funds are often then quickly transferred offshore, making recovery very challenging. Despite the pervasiveness of this threat (the FBI estimated that between January 2015 and February 2017, over $3 billion have been lost by companies around the world to this scam), most traditional insurance policies do not cover this type of loss. Many policyholders have challenged insurance companies' assertions that this is not a covered loss in court; however a series of recent (2017) North American cases support the insurers' positions, notably American Tooling Center, Inc. v. Travelers Casualty and Surety Company of America, The Brick Warehouse LP v. Chubb Insurance Company of Canada, and Taylor & Lieberman v. Federal Insurance Company.

The industry has responded to these events by making an extension of coverage available but they are typically subject to additional premium, robust underwriting questions, and are often sublimited.

== By country ==
=== Australia ===
In Australia, this type of employer protection is usually called employee dishonesty insurance coverage. (Other names, such as "Fidelity Cover" may also be used by specific insurance agencies or brokers.)

=== Nigeria ===
Several forms of fidelity guarantee cover are available: an individual policy or "floater policy", relating to a named employee; a collective policy, covering a group of employees; or a "blanket policy" which would cover a generic category of employee, such as those who handle the company's cash.

=== United Kingdom ===
In the United Kingdom, this type of employee dishonesty insurance is called fidelity guarantee insurance coverage.

=== United States ===
In the United States, various service providers to pension plans governed by the Employee Retirement Income Security Act of 1974 (ERISA) are required to obtain and maintain fidelity bond coverage in prescribed amounts.
