= Economic Times Awards =

Awards presented by The Economic Times

Economic Times Award for Corporate Excellence
- Awarded for: Business, Finance and Corporate Excellence
- Sponsored by: The Economic Times
- Location: Mumbai
- First award: 1998
- Final award: 2024
- Website: http://www.etawards.economictimes.com

The Economic Times Awards for Corporate Excellence (also referred as ET Awards) are the awards conferred by The Economic Times in the field of business, corporate and government policies, economies in India. It is an annual awards, conferred in various categories. Since 2017, Deloitte Touche Tohmatsu India LLP (Deloitte) has been the title sponsor of the awards.

== ET Awards 1998 ==
- Company of the year: Infosys

== ET Awards 2001 ==
- Company of the Year: Tata Steel
- Lifetime Achievement Award: Dhirubhai Ambani and Dr. Verghese Kurien

== ET Awards 2002 ==
- Business Leader of the Year: Arun Shourie, Union Minister for Disinvestment
- Businesswoman of the Year: Lijjat Papad
- Entrepreneur of the Year: Jerry Rao of Mphasis BFL
- Company of the Year: Hero Honda
- Emerging Company of the Year: Balaji Telefilms
- Lifetime Achievement: M S Swaminathan, father of the Green Revolution and F C Kohli, father of Indian software
- Corporate Citizen of the Year: Aditya Vikram Birla Group

== ET Awards 2003 ==
- Business Leader of the Year: Kumar Mangalam Birla
- Lifetime Achievement: Deepak Parekh
- Businesswoman of the Year: Ela Bhatt
- Global Indian: Amar Bose
- Company of the Year: Ranbaxy
- Emerging Company of the Year: I-flex

== ET Awards 2004 ==
- Businesswoman of the Year: Kiran Mazumdar-Shaw

== ET Awards 2005 ==
- Business Leader of the Year: Sunil Mittal
- Businesswoman of the Year: Chanda Kochhar
- Entrepreneur of the Year: H.K. Mittal
- Company of the Year: Tata Consultancy Services
- Lifetime Achievement Award: N. Vaghul
- Business Reformer of the Year: P. Chidambaram
- Corporate Citizen of the Year: Azim Premji Foundation

== ET Awards 2006 ==
- Businesswoman of the year: Mallika Srinivasan, Tractors and Farm Equipment (TAFE)
- Entrepreneur of the year: H K Mittal, Mercator Lines
- Global Indian of the year: Indra Nooyi, Pepsi
- Business Reformer of the year: P Chidambaram
- Policy Change Agent of the year: Montek Singh Ahluwalia, Planning Commission
- Company of the year: Tata Consultancy Services
- Emerging company of the year: Amtek Auto
- Lifetime Achievement: N Vaghul, ICICI Bank
- Corporate Citizen of the Year: Azim Premji Foundation

== ET Awards 2007 ==
- Business Leader of the year: K V Kamath

== ET Awards 2008 ==
- Business Leader of the year: A M Naik, L&T
- Business Woman of the year: Shikha Sharma, ICICI Prudential
- Entrepreneur of the year: Dilip Sanghavi, Sun Pharmaceuticals
- Global Indian of the year: Arun Sarin, Vodafone Group
- Business Reformer of the year: Kamal Nath, Union Commerce and Industry Minister
- Policy Change Agent of the year: E Sreedharan, Delhi Metro Rail Corporation
- Company of the year: Tata Steel
- Emerging Company of the year: Welspun Gujarat Stahl Rohren
- Lifetime Achievement Award: Ashok Ganguly, former chairman, HLL
- Corporate Citizen of the year: Dr Reddy's Foundation

== ET Awards 2009 ==
- Business Leader of the year: Anand Mahindra, Mahindra Group
- Business Woman of the year: Vinita Bali, Britannia Industries
- Entrepreneur of the year: GVK Reddy, GVK Group
- Global Indian of the year: Ram Charan, management guru and thinker
- Business Reformer of the year: Nitish Kumar, Chief Minister of Bihar state
- Policy Change Agent of the year: Jean Dreze, National Rural Employment Guarantee Scheme
- Company of the year: Hero Honda
- Emerging Company of the year: Idea Cellular
- Lifetime Achievement Award: Keshub Mahindra, Mahindra Group
- Corporate Citizen of the year: The Energy and Resources Institute (TERI)

== ET Awards 2010 ==
- Business Leader of the year: Aditya Puri, HDFC Bank
- Business Woman of the year: Zia Mody, AZB Partners
- Entrepreneur of the year: Narendra Murkumbi, Renuka Sugars
- Global Indian of the year: Nitin Nohria, Dean, Harvard Business School
- Business Reformer of the year: Kapil Sibal, minister of human resources development
- Policy Change Agent of the year: Aruna Roy and Arvind Kejriwal, — the founders of Parivartan
- Company of the year: Larsen & Toubro
- Emerging Company of the year: Cadila Healthcare
- Lifetime Achievement Award: R. C. Bhargava, the non-executive chairman of Maruti Suzuki

== ET Awards 2011 ==
- Business Leader of the year: Chanda Kochhar, ICICI Bank
- Entrepreneur of the year: Rahul Bhatia, IndiGo
- Global Indian of the year: Vikram Pandit, Citibank
- Policy Change Agent of the year: Nandan Nilekani
- Company of the year: Bajaj Auto
- Emerging Company of the year: Shree Renuka Sugars
- Lifetime Achievement Award: Yaga Venugopal Reddy, Former Governor of the Reserve Bank of India

== ET Awards 2012 ==
- Business Leader of the year: Anil Agarwal
- Corporate Citizen of the year: Aditya Birla Group
- Entrepreneur of the year: Devi Prasad Shetty
- Global Indian of the year: Anshu Jain
- Policy Change Agent of the year: Sam Pitroda
- Company of the year: HDFC Bank
- Emerging Company of the year: Jubilant FoodWorks
- Lifetime Achievement Award: PRS Oberoi

== ET Awards 2013 ==
- Lifetime Achievement Award: Dr Vinayshil Gautam

== ET Awards 2014 ==
- Company of the Year: Tata Consultancy Services (TCS)
- Business Leader of the Year: Dilip Shanghvi, MD of Sun Pharmaceutical
- Business Reformer of the Year: U.K. Sinha, Chairman of SEBI
- Global Indian Award: Subhash Chandra, Chairman of the Essel Group
- Entrepreneurs of the Year: Kunal Bahl and Rohit Bansal of Snapdeal
- Corporate Citizen of the Year: Hindustan Unilever Limited

Business Communicator of the Year: N. Chandrasekaran, CEO of TCS

- Emerging Company of the Year: Amazon India
- The Asian Business Award: Gautam Adani, Chairman of the Adani Group
- Lifetime Achievement: PRS Oberoi, Chairman of the Oberoi Group
- The Entrepreneur of the Year Award: Sachin Bansal and Binny Bansal, co-founders of Flipkart

== ET Awards 2015 ==
- Company of the Year: Hindustan Unilever
- Business Leader of the Year: Uday Kotak
- Entrepreneur of the Year: Kunal Bahl
- Lifetime Achievement: S Ramadorai
- Emerging Company of the Year: Eicher Motors
- Global Indian: Nikesh Arora
- Corporate Citizen of the Year: Infosys Foundation
- Business Reformer: Piyush Goyal

== ET Awards 2016 ==
- Business Leader of the Year: N. Chandrasekaran (TCS)
- Entrepreneur of the Year: Vijay Shekhar Sharma (Paytm)
- Emerging Company of the Year: Aditya Ghosh (InterGlobe Aviation / IndiGo)
- Company of the Year: Kotak Mahindra Bank
- Global Indian: Sundar Pichai (Google)
- Lifetime Achievement K.V. Kamath
- Business Reformer of the Year: Nitin Gadkari
- Policy Change Agent of the Year: S. Jaishankar (Foreign Secretary)
- Corporate Citizen of the Year: Ashoke Joshi (Srinivasan Services Trust) and Sudarshan Venu (TVS Motor Company)

== ET Awards 2017 ==
Deloitte was the title sponsor for the event, held on 28 October 2017 in Mumbai.

- ET AWARDS FOR CORPORATE EXCELLENCE
- The Economic Times Awards for Corporate Excellence
- Lifetime Achievement Award: YC Deveshwar, chairman, ITC
- Business Leader of the Year: Mukesh Ambani, chairman and MD, Reliance Industries
- Entrepreneur of the Year: Bhavish Aggarawal, Co-founder & CEO, Ola Cabs
- Global Indian of the Year: Prem Watsa, Chairman & Chief Executive, Fairfax Financial Holdings
- Business Reformer & Policy Change Agent: Arun Jaitley, Union Minister of Finance and Corporate Affairs

== ET Awards 2018 ==
The Economic Times Awards for Corporate Excellence

The 2018 leg of the awards will be held on 17 November 2018 in Mumbai. Deloitte continues to be the title sponsor of the event.

The jury for the awards met on 4 September 2018 in Mumbai. It comprised:

- Aditya Puri: Managing Director, HDFC Bank
- Nandan Nilekani: Chairman, Infosys
- Harish Manwani: Independent Director, Tata Sons
- Uday Kotak: MD, Kotak Mahindra Bank
- Ritesh Agarwal: Founder, OYO Rooms
- Vijay Shekhar Sharma: Founder, Paytm
- Kalpana Morparia: CEO, South and South East Asia, JP Morgan
- Cyril Shroff: Managing Partner, Cyril Amarchand Mangaldas

The jury members also participated in a panel discussion on the topic, "Spurring equitable growth: role of government, technology, and business". They were joined in the panel discussion by N. Venkatram, Managing Partner and CEO, Deloitte India.

2018 award winners:

- Lifetime Achievement Award: Adi Godrej: Chairman, Godrej Group
- Business Leader of the Year: Sanjiv Bajaj, managing director, Bajaj Finserv
- Entrepreneur of the Year: Sumant Sinha, Chairman & MD, ReNew Power Ventures
- Global Indian: Shantanu Narayen, CEO, Adobe Systems
- Business Performer of the Year: K. Chandrashekar Rao, Chief Minister, Telangana
- Company of the Year: HDFC Bank
- Emerging Company of the Year: Page Industries
- Policy Change Agent of the Year: National Payments Corporation of India (NPCI)
- Corporate Citizen: Hindustan Unilever

== ET Awards 2019 ==
The Economic Times Awards for Corporate Excellence

The 2019 leg of the awards will be held on 30 November 2019 in Mumbai. Deloitte continues to be the title sponsor of the event.

The jury for the awards met on 25 September 2019 in Delhi. It comprised:

- Anu Aga
- Nandan Nilekani
- Bhavish Aggarwal: Co-founder, OLA Cabs
- Sunil Mittal: Founder and chairman, Bharti Enterprises
- Kalpana Moraparia: Chief Executive Officer, JP Morgan India
- Pawan Munjal: Chairman, Managing Director & CEO, Hero Motocorp
- Sadhguru: Founder, Isha Foundation
- Uday Shankar: chairman and CEO, Star India
- Cyril Shroff: Managing Partner, Cyril Amarchand Mangaldas

== ET Awards 2020 ==
- Entrepreneur of the Year: Adar Poonawalla of Serum Institute of India
- Global Indian of the Year: Piyush Gupta, CEO of DBS Group
- Company of the Year: HDFC Bank
- Emerging Company of the Year: ICICI Lombard
- Corporate Citizen of the Year: TCS
- ET Evoke Social Entrepreneur of the year: Neelam Chhiber

== ET Awards 2021 ==
- Business Leader of the Year: Adar Poonawalla (CEO, Serum Institute of India)
- Lifetime Achievement: Dr. Pratap Chandra Reddy (Founder, Apollo Hospital)
- Global Indian of the Year: Punit Renjen (Global CEO, Deloitte)
- Businesswoman of the Year: Samina Hamied (Executive Vice-chairperson, Cipla)
- Entrepreneur of the Year: [

Girish Mathrubootham (Founder and CEO, Freshworks)

- Company of the Year: Infosys
- Corporate Citizen of the Year: HCL Technologies
- Emerging Company of the Year: Laurus Labs

The Economic Times ET Rise, India's Fastest Growing MSME 2021 Awards

- Campus Sutra Retail Pvt Ltd
- Dev Milk Food Pvt Ltd
- US Transworld Logistics
- White rivers Media Solutions Pvt Ltd
- Solitaire Overseas
- Panacea Infosec Pvt Ltd
- UpCurve Business Services Pvt Ltd (udChalo)
- DGS Translogistics India Pvt Ltd
- Satya Exports
- Data cipher solutions pvt ltd

== ET Awards 2022 ==
- Company of the Year: ICICI Bank
- Lifetime Achievement: Shiv Nadar, Chairman Emeritus, HCL Technologies
- Businesswoman of the Year: Arathi Krishna, managing director, Sundram Fasteners
- Entrepreneur of the Year: Nithin Kamath, Founder, Zerodha
- Business Leader of the Year: Sunil Mittal, Founder & Chairman, Bharti Enterprises
- Business Reformer of the Year: Mansukh Mandaviya, Minister for Health and Family Welfare
- Corporate Citizen of the Year: Harsh Mariwala, Marico founder
- Emerging Company of the Year: Adani Transmission

== ET Awards 2023 ==
- Company of the Year: State Bank of India
- Business Leader of the Year: CK Venkataraman (Titan)
- Entrepreneur of the Year: Ramesh Juneja and Rajeev Juneja (Mankind Pharma)
- Lifetime Achievement: AM Naik(Larsen & Toubro)
- Reformer of the Year: S. Jaishankar (Minister of External Affairs)
- Global Indian of the Year: Leena Nair (CEO, Chanel)
- Businesswoman Of The Year: Arathi Krishna (Sundram Fasteners)
- Policy Change Agent Of The Year: TV Somanathan (Finance Secretary)
- Corporate Citizen Of The Year: Marico
- Emerging Company of the Year: Not specified in the provided sources, but mentioned in one result.
- Business Reformer Of The Year: Mansukh Mandaviya (Minister for Health and Family Welfare, Chemicals and Fertilisers)

== ET Awards 2024 ==
- Business Leader of the Year: Kumar Mangalam Birla
- Lifetime Achievement: Venu Srinivasan
- Reformer of the Year: Ashwini Vaishnaw
- Jewel of India: Ratan Tata (honored in this category)
- Global Indian of the Year: Fareed Zakaria
- Entrepreneur of the Year: Peyush Bansal
- Businesswoman of the Year: Vishakha Mulye
- Company of the Year: Zomato was named the winner in this category.
- Conscious Corporate Award: Grasim Industries received this award for its ESG efforts.
- Emerging company of the Year: Lenskart was recognized in this category.

== ET Awards 2025 ==
- Company of the Year: Bharti Airtel
- Business Leader of the Year: Sajjan Jindal
- Lifetime Achievement: KP Singh and Cyrus Poonawalla
- Business Reformer of the Year: N Chandrababu Naidu
- Global Indian of the Year: Neal Mohan
- Businesswoman Of The Year: Vibha Padalkar

== See also ==
- List of economics awards
