= List of Baniyas =

This is a partial list of notable/famous people from Baniya community.

== Freedom fighters ==
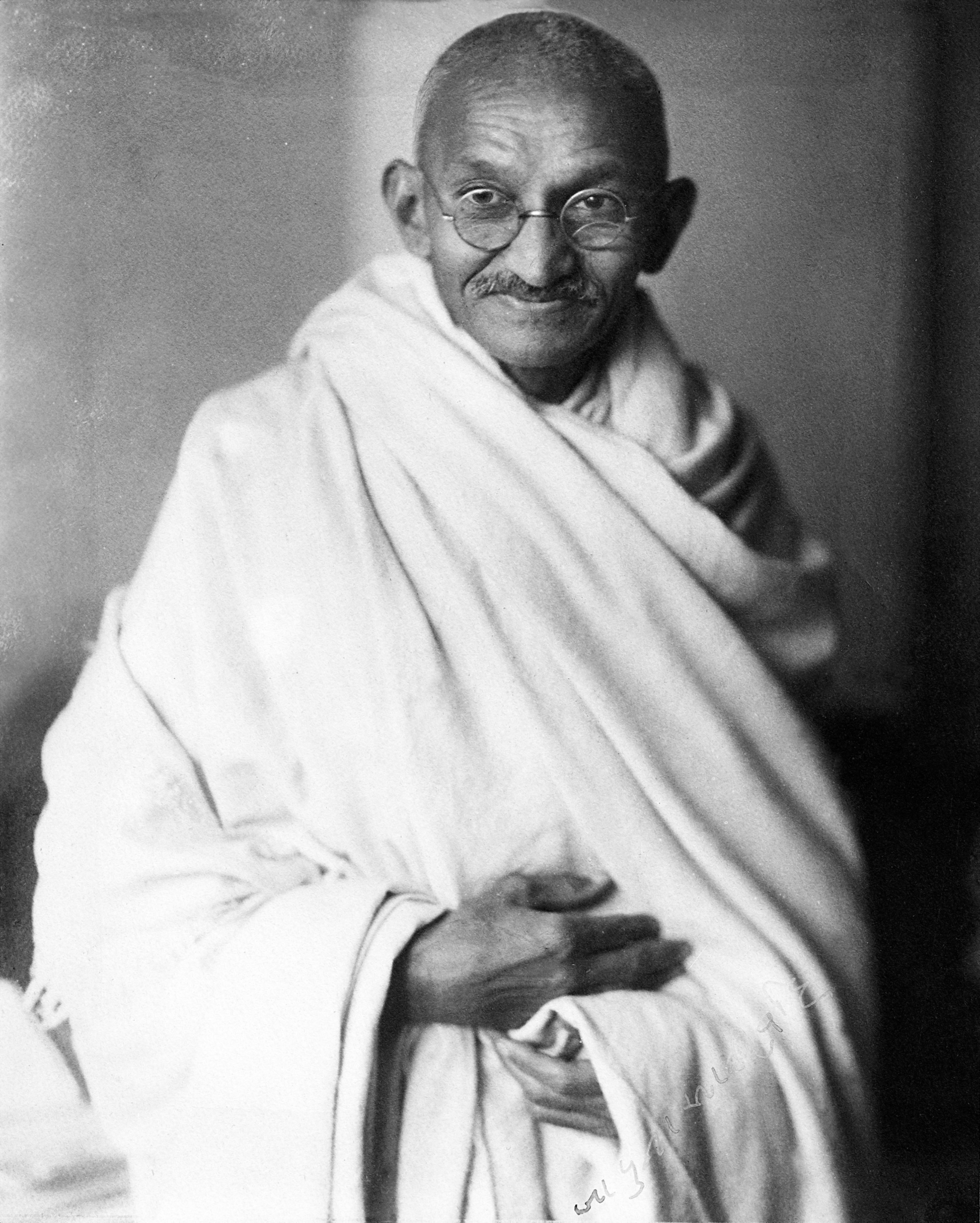
Mahatma Gandhi

- Mahatma Gandhi (1869–1948), Indian independence activist.
- Kasturba Gandhi (1869–1944), Wife of Mahatma Gandhi.
- Karamchand Gandhi (1822–1885), - Father of Mahatma Gandhi.
- Ram Manohar Lohia - Quit India Movement fame and General Secretary of Praja Socialist Party
- Lala Lajpat Rai - Indian revolutionary, politician, and author, popularly known as "Punjab Kesari"

== Arts ==
- Bhagwan Das, Bharat Ratna (India's highest civilian award) awardee
- Sita Ram Goel, historian, religious and political activist, writer, and publisher in the late twentieth century
- Bharatendu Harishchandra, Known as the "father of modern Hindi literature and Hindi theatre"

== Corporate and business ==
=== Technology and startups ===
- Bhavish Aggarwal, co-founder and CEO, Ola Cabs and Ola Electric

=== Other businesses ===
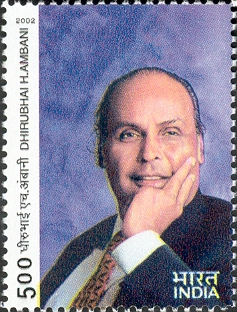
Dhirubhai Ambani.

- Dhirubhai Ambani, Indian businessman, Reliance Industries
- Jamnalal Bajaj, the adopted son of Mahatma Gandhi and the founder of the Bajaj Group of Industries
- Lalbhai Dalpatbhai (1863–1912), Gujarati industrialist
- Ramnath Goenka and family, Indian Express Limited
- Walchand Hirachand (1882–1953), Indian industrialist and founder of Walchand group
- Seth Hukumchand (1874–1959), Indian industrialist
- Khushalchand Jhaveri (1680–1748), Indian jeweller and financier
- Shantidas Jhaveri (1584–1659), Indian jeweller, bullion trader, and moneylender
- Rakesh Jhunjhunwala, Indian billionaire investor, stock trader, and Chartered Accountant, founder of Akasa Air
- Premchand Roychand (1832–1906), 19th century Indian businessman and founder of Bombay Stock Exchange
- Sarabhai family, a prominent Business family
- Jagat Seth family, merchant, banker and money lender family in Bengal

== Politics and activists ==
=== Activists ===
- Sir Ganga Ram Agrawal, civil engineer and architect known as "the father of modern-day Lahore"

=== India ===
- Rekha Gupta, Politician, Chief Minister of Delhi
- Arvind Kejriwal, Chief Minister of Delhi
- Amit Shah, Union Minister of Home Affairs, Minister of Co-operation, Member of Parliament (MP), President of the Bharatiya Janata Party (BJP), chairman of the National Democratic Alliance (NDA), Member of Gujarat Legislative Assembly, Minister of State, Government of Gujarat

== See also ==
- Agrawal Jain
