= Itolizumab =

Monoclonal antibody

Monoclonal antibody
- Type: Whole antibody
- Source: Humanized
- Target: CD6

Clinical data
- Trade names: Alzumab
- ATC code: none

Legal status
- Legal status: Approved in India

Identifiers
- CAS Number: 1116433-11-4
- ChemSpider: none
- UNII: XQQ2RHV14N
- KEGG: D12426

Itolizumab (INN, trade name Alzumab) is a 'first in class' humanized IgG1 monoclonal antibody developed by Biocon and the Center of Molecular Immunology (CIM), Havana.

== Mechanism of action ==
It selectively targets CD6, a pan T cell marker involved in co-stimulation, adhesion and maturation of T cells. Itolizumab, by binding to CD6, down regulates T cell activation, causes reduction in synthesis of pro-inflammatory cytokines and possibly plays an important role by reducing T cell infiltration at sites of inflammation.

== Clinical trials ==
A double blind, placebo controlled, phase III treat –Plaq study of itolizumab successfully met the pre-specified primary end-point of significant improvement in PASI-75 (Psoriasis Area and Severity Index) score after 12 weeks of treatment in patients with moderate to severe psoriasis compared to placebo.

== Applications ==
Biocon received marketing authorization for the drug from the Drugs Controller General of India (DCGI) in January 2013 and marketing within India commenced in August 2013.

In July 2020, Biocon received authorization in India for its use in the treatment of COVID-19.
