= Rocketium =

Marketing company

Rocketium Technologies Pvt. Ltd.
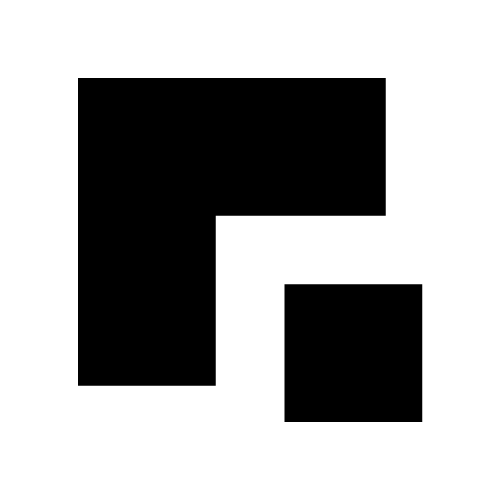
- Trade name: Rocketium
- Type: Private
- Industry: Creative Operations
- Founded: June 2015; 11 years ago
- Founders: Satej Sirur; Anurag Dwivedi
- Headquarters: Bengaluru
- Area served: Worldwide
- Website: rocketium.ai

Rocketium (/ˌrɒkəˈtiːəm/ ROK-ə-TEE-əm;) is a SaaS marketing software company registered in Newark, Delaware, United States. It is a Creative-Ops platform using AI-driven automation.

Rocketium is funded by investors like 021 Capital, 1Crowd, Blume Ventures, and Emergent Ventures.

== History ==
Rocketium was founded in June 2015 by former colleagues from TaxiForSure, Anurag Dwivedi and Satej Sirur.

The company launched as a game-based content platform aimed at making educational and informative quizzes and simulation games. The founders pivoted to building a video-making tool in June 2016. This self-service tool was aimed at the B2C segment of non-designers, like social media marketers, content writers, and journalists.

Rocketium soon partnered with Amazon to create a self-service ad-creation platform for advertisers looking to promote their products on Amazon.

After raising $3.2 million in Series A funding, Rocketium pivoted again to become a creative automation platform, with the intention of enabling enterprises to scale their creative production. However, realizing the problems present in the existing creative infrastructure of most enterprises, Rocketium evolved instead into a creative operations platform.

Rocketium supports integrations with multiple eCommerce and advertising platforms, APIs and tools, such as Dropbox, Slack, Facebook ads, Google Drive, and Thirdlight, and can custom-build integrations that a brand needs.

Rocketium has also developed enterprise-focused creative analytics.

== Funding ==
- Rocketium raised $300K in 2017 from early-stage venture capital firm Blume Ventures and senior leaders from Apple, Microsoft, and SpaceX.
  - In 2019, the company raised $750K from crowdfunding service 1Crowd and Blume Ventures.
  - In 2021, Rocketium raised $3.2 million from Emergent Ventures, 1Crowd, and Blume Ventures.
