= Kiran Mazumdar-Shaw =

Indian entrepreneur (born 1953)

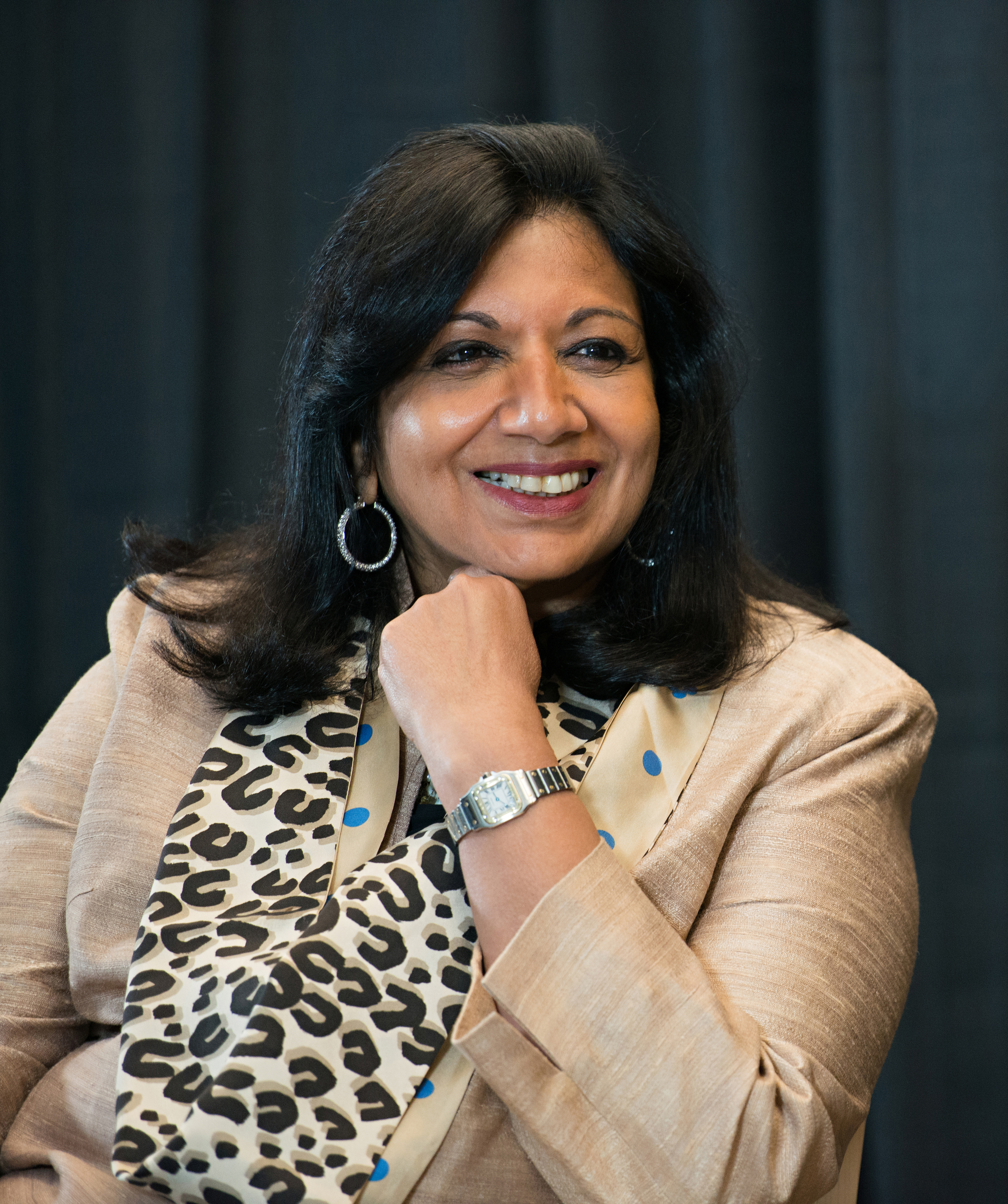
- Mazumdar-Shaw in 2014
- Born: Kiran Mazumdar; 23 March 1953 (age 73); Bangalore, Mysore State, India
- Education: Bangalore University (B.Sc.); Melbourne University (M.S.)
- Occupations: Founder & chairperson of Biocon
- Spouse: John Shaw (m. 1998; died 2022)
- Awards: Padma Shri (1989); Padma Bhushan (2005); Othmer Gold Medal (2014)

Kiran Mazumdar-Shaw (born 23 March 1953) is an Indian billionaire entrepreneur. She is the executive chairperson and founder of Biocon Limited and Biocon Biologics Limited, a biotechnology company based in Bangalore, India and the former chairperson of Indian Institute of Management, Bangalore. In 2014, she was awarded the Othmer Gold Medal for outstanding contributions to the progress of science and chemistry. She was on the Financial Times 2011 top 50 women in business list. In 2019, she was listed as the 68th most powerful woman in the world by Forbes. She was named EY World Entrepreneur Of The Year 2020.

As of 2025, Mazumdar-Shaw is ranked 93rd-wealthiest in India, with a net worth of $3.42 billion.

== Early life ==
Kiran Mazumdar was born on 23 March 1953 in Bangalore, Karnataka state, to Gujarati parents. She was educated at Bangalore's Bishop Cotton Girl's High School, graduating in 1968. She then attended Mount Carmel College, Bangalore, a women's college offering pre-university courses as an affiliate of Bangalore University. She studied biology and zoology, graduating from Bangalore University with a bachelor's degree in zoology in 1973. Mazumdar hoped to go to medical school, but was not able to obtain a scholarship.

Her father, Rasendra Mazumdar, was the head brewmaster at United Breweries. He suggested that she study fermentation science, and train to be a brewmaster, a very non-traditional field for women. Mazumdar went to Ballarat College, Melbourne University in Australia to study malting and brewing. In 1974, she was the only woman enrolled in the brewing course and topped in her class. She earned the degree as master brewer in 1975.

She worked as a trainee brewer in Carlton and United Breweries, Melbourne and as a trainee maltster at Barrett Brothers and Burston, Australia. She also worked for some time as a technical consultant at Jupiter Breweries Limited, Calcutta and as a technical manager at Standard Maltings Corporation, Baroda between 1975 and 1977. However, when she investigated the possibility of advancing her career in Bangalore or Delhi, she was told that she could not be hired as a master brewer in India because "It's a man's work." She began to look abroad for opportunities and was offered a position in Scotland.

== Biocon ==
External videos
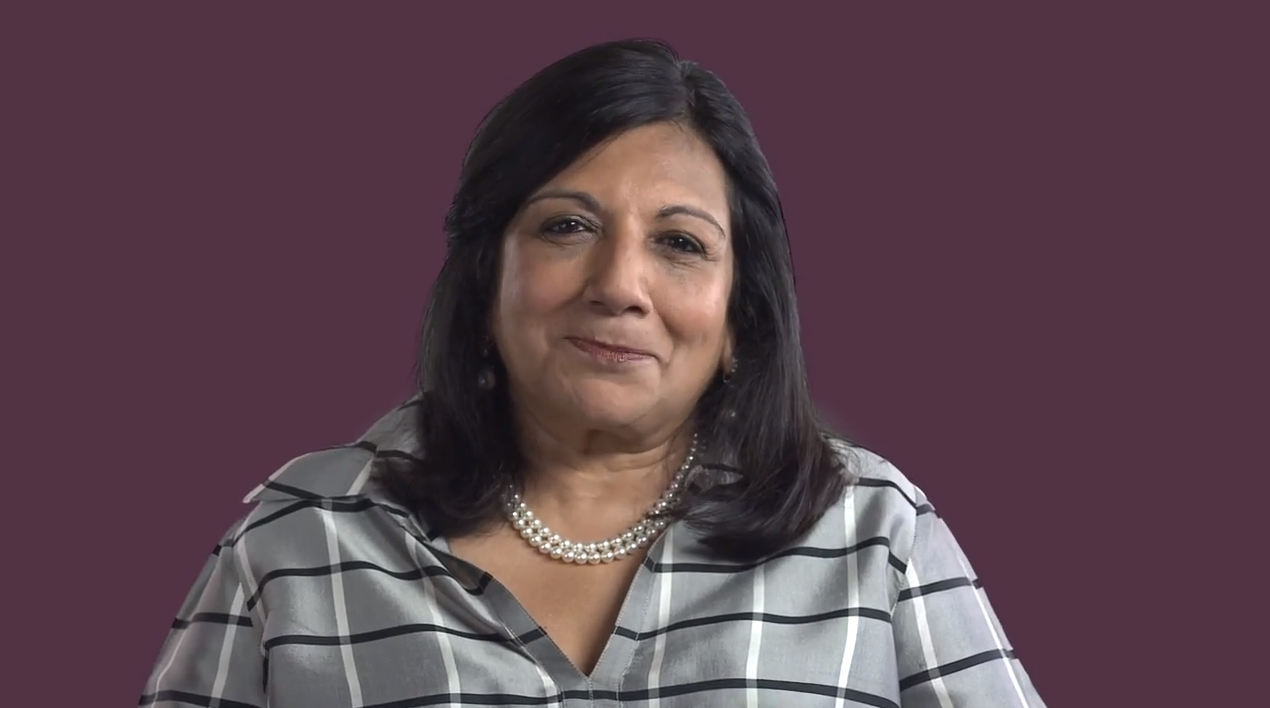
- "I managed to do things with a lot of common sense, a lot of determination, and a lot of foolish courage", Women in Chemistry, Science History Institute
- "Keep trying to find a differentiated model, don't just try to do what others are doing.... that's where innovation comes.", History Live, Science History Institute

Before Mazumdar could move, she met Leslie Auchincloss, the founder of Biocon Biochemicals Limited, of Cork, Ireland. Auchincloss's company produced enzymes for use in the brewing, food-packaging and textile industries. Auchincloss was looking for a partner in India to help establish an Indian subsidiary to supply him with Papain. Mazumdar agreed to undertake the job on the condition that if she did not wish to continue six months later she would be given a brewmaster's position comparable to the one she was giving up.

=== Beginning with enzymes ===
After a brief period as a trainee manager at Biocon Biochemicals Limited, of Cork, Ireland, to learn more about the business, Kiran Mazumdar Shaw returned to India. She started Biocon India in 1978 in the garage of her rented house in Bengaluru with a seed capital of Rs. 10,000. Although it was a joint venture, Indian laws restricted foreign ownership to only 30% of the company, which meant that 70% of the company belonged to Kiran Mazumdar Shaw.

Initially, she faced credibility challenges because of her youth, gender and her untested business model, She was unable to secure funding for her company in the early stages of her business. A chance meeting with a banker at a social event finally enabled her to get her first financial backing. She also found it difficult to recruit people to work for her start-up, her first employee was a retired garage mechanic and her first unit was in a nearby 280-square-metre (3,000-square-foot) shed. The most complicated piece of equipment in her lab at that time was a spectrophotometer. Moreover, she faced the technological challenges associated with trying to build a biotech business in a country with poor infrastructure. Uninterrupted power, good quality water, sterile labs, imported research equipment, and workers with advanced scientific skills were not easily available in India at that period of time.

The company's initial projects were the extraction of papain (an enzyme from papaya used to tenderize meat) and isinglass (obtained from tropical catfish and used to clarify beer). Within a year of its inception, Biocon India was able to manufacture enzymes and export them to the US and Europe, the first Indian company to do so. At the end of her first year, Mazumdar used her earnings to buy an eight-hectare (20-acre) property with plans to expand in the future.

=== Expanding into biopharmaceuticals ===
Mazumdar spearheaded Biocon's evolution from an industrial enzymes manufacturing company to a fully integrated biopharmaceutical company with a well-balanced business portfolio of products and a research focus on diabetes, oncology and auto-immune diseases. She also established two subsidiaries: Syngene (1994) which provides early research and development support services on a contract basis and Clinigene (2000) which focuses on clinical research trials and the development of both generic and new medicines. Clinigene was later merged with Syngene. Syngene was listed on BSE/NSE in 2015 and has a current market cap of ₹23,000 crores.

In 1984, Kiran began to develop a research and development team at Biocon, focusing on the discovery of novel enzymes and on development of novel techniques for solid substrate fermentation technology. The company's first major expansion came in 1987, when Narayanan Vaghul of ICICI Ventures supported creation of a venture capital fund of US$250,000. This money enabled Biocon to expand its research and development efforts. They built a new plant featuring proprietary solid substrate fermentation technology based on a semi-automated tray culture process, inspired by Japanese techniques. In 1989, Biocon became the first Indian biotech company to receive U.S. funding for proprietary technologies.

In 1990, Mazumdar incorporated Biocon Biopharmaceuticals Private Limited (BBLP) to manufacture and market a select range of biotherapeutics in a joint venture with the Cuban Center of Molecular Immunology.

=== Establishing independence ===
Biocon Biochemicals of Ireland was acquired from Leslie Auchincloss by Unilever in 1989. The partnership with Unilever helped Biocon to establish global best practices and quality systems. In 1997, Unilever sold its specialty chemicals division, including Biocon, to Imperial Chemical Industries (ICI). In 1998, Kiran Mazumdar's fiancée, Scotsman John Shaw, personally raised $2 million to purchase the outstanding Biocon shares from ICI. The couple married in 1998, whereupon she became known as Kiran Mazumdar-Shaw. John Shaw left his position as chairman at Madura Coats to join Biocon. He became Biocon's vice chairman in 2001.

In 2004, after seeking the advice of Narayana Murthy, Mazumdar-Shaw decided to list Biocon on the stock market. Her intent was to raise capital to further develop Biocon's research programs. Biocon was the first biotechnology company in India to issue an IPO. Biocon's IPO was oversubscribed 33 times and its first day of trading closed with a market value of $1.11 billion, making Biocon the second Indian company to cross the $1-billion mark on the first day of listing.

=== Affordable innovation ===
Mazumdar-Shaw's belief in "affordable innovation" has always been a driving philosophy behind Biocon's expansion. Inspired by the need for affordable drugs in less-wealthy countries, she has looked for opportunities to develop cost-effective techniques and low-cost alternatives. She has also proposed that drug companies be cost-sensitive in marketing to developing countries, so that people can afford the drugs they need, particularly chronic therapies.

Mazumdar-Shaw noticed the market potential for statins (cholesterol-fighting drugs) early on. When the patent of the cholesterol-lowering drug lovastatin expired in 2001, Biocon got involved in its development. Then the company expanded to other forms of statins. Part of her strategy was to enter into long-term supply contracts, establishing a dependable market base over time. Statins soon accounted for over 50 per cent of the company's revenue. The company's revenue went up from ₹70 crore in 1998, to ₹500 crore in 2004 when it went public.

Biocon continues to expand into new areas. Yeast expression platforms offer a desirable alternative to mammalian cell cultures for the genetic manipulation of cells for use in a variety of drug treatments. Unicellular methylotrophic yeasts such as Pichia pastoris are used in the production of vaccines, antibody fragments, hormones, cytokines, matrix proteins, and biosimilars.

Biocon's major areas of research now include cancer, diabetes, and other auto-immune diseases such as rheumatoid arthritis and psoriasis. Because of the high percentage of people in India who chew betel or tobacco, India accounts for eighty-six per cent of oral cancer in the world, known locally as "cancer cheek". Diabetes is prevalent, and people who do not wear shoes are at risk to have a minor scrape or injury develop into gangrene, or "diabetes foot". Biocon is also working on drugs to treat psoriasis, a skin pigment disease.

Bio-pharmaceuticals developed by the company include Pichia-derived recombinant human insulin and insulin analogs for diabetes, an anti-EGFR monoclonal antibody for head and neck cancer, and a biologic for psoriasis. Biocon is Asia's largest insulin producer, and has the largest perfusion-based antibody production facilities.

As of 2014, Biocon directed about 10% of its revenue into research and development, a much higher proportion than most Indian pharmacological companies. Biocon has filed at least 950 patent applications based on its research activity. Mazumdar-Shaw has remained actively engaged in acquisitions, partnerships and in-licensing in the pharmaceuticals and bio-pharmaceutical areas, entering into more than 2,200 high-value R&D licensing and other deals between 2005 and 2010.

== Philanthropic activities ==
In 2004, Mazumdar-Shaw started a corporate social responsibility wing at Biocon, the Biocon Foundation. The Foundation focuses on health, education and infrastructure, especially in rural areas of Karnataka which lack healthcare facilities.

Mazumdar-Shaw dislikes the term "philanthropy", believing that it often provides temporary fixes rather than addressing the root cause or the underlying situation. She prefers the term "compassionate capitalist", believing that properly applied business models can provide an ongoing foundation for sustainable social progress. Mazumdar once said, "Innovation and commerce are as powerful tools for creating social progress as they are for driving technological advancement. When they are put to use for social progress, the implementation is a lot cheaper, a lot more people benefit, and the effect is more lasting." In 2015, she joined The Giving Pledge, promising that at least half of her wealth will be dedicated to philanthropy.

=== Health ===
Rural areas in India are estimated to have only one doctor for every two thousand people, it is estimated that 70 million people do not have the money to pay for a doctor's visit or for medicine. The Biocon Foundation is involved in numerous health and education outreach programs to benefit the economically weaker sections of Indian society.

==== Arogya Raksha Yojana ====
With Devi Shetty of Narayana Hrudayalaya Hospital, Mazumdar-Shaw has supported the development of Arogya Raksha Yojana (Health Protection Program/Health Help). Through this program Biocon Foundation establishes clinics to offer clinical care, generic medicines and basic tests for those who cannot afford them. As of 2010, seven clinics each served a population of 50,000 patients living within a radius of 10 km, treating in total more than 3,00,000 people per year. Clinics organize regular general health checks in remote villages by bringing in physicians and doctors from network hospitals. To improve early detection of cancer, they have trained young women as community health workers, using smartphones to send photographs of suspicious lesions to oncologists at the cancer center. Public health campaigns such as "Queen of Heart" educate people about specific health issues and promote early detection of problems such as cardiovascular diseases.

The clinics operate based on a model of micro-financed health insurance. Biocon provides low-cost drugs, making a negligible profit on a unit basis, but an overall profit on volume due to the participation of large numbers of people. Clinics also use a "subsidised convenience" pricing plan, under which more wealthy patrons pay full price in return for the convenience of scheduling their visits and procedures at desirable times, while poorer patients can obtain cheap or even free services by choosing less desirable times. Doctors and researchers look for opportunities to use cutting-edge technology in ways that will drive down costs and ensure quality of service.

==== Mazumdar-Shaw Medical Foundation ====
The death of her best friend, Nilima Rovshen, and the illnesses of her husband and her mother with cancer, have motivated Mazumdar-Shaw to support cancer research and treatment. In 2009, she established a 1,400-bed cancer care center, the Mazumdar-Shaw Medical Foundation, at the Narayana Health City campus in Bangalore, collaborating with Devi Shetty of Narayana Hrudayalaya. In 2011, she added a center for advanced therapeutics with a bone marrow transplant unit and a research center. Her goal is to create a world-class cancer center.

Mazumdar Shaw Medical Foundation is a non-profit organization and has two arms to support its cause, which are Mazumdar Shaw Center for Translational Research and Mazumdar Shaw Cancer outreach program.

=== Education ===
In collaboration with McMillan India Limited and teacher Prathima Rao, Mazumdar-Shaw has supported development and use of a basic mathematics textbook, introduced in Kannada schools in 2006.

She funded a multi-year research program by creating the Biocon Cell for Innovation Management with Prasad kaipa at the Indian School of Business in 2009.

=== Infrastructure ===
Mazumdar-Shaw speaks about the importance of improving India's infrastructure, emphasizing the need to address issues such as efficient governance, job creation, and food, water, and health insecurity.

Biocon, Infosys and other companies have had a significant impact on Bengaluru. These companies attract many scientists who would otherwise go overseas. Once a "pensioner's paradise", Bangalore is now called "the best urban working environment in India". Biocon Park, built in 2005, is a 35-hectare (90-acre) campus with 5000 employees. Outside the developed city, however, infrastructure is still poor.

Mazumdar-Shaw is a proponent of good government and infrastructure. She supported the Bangalore Agenda Task Force, an initiative of S. M. Krishna and Nandan Nilekani to improve the city's infrastructure and standard of living. Mazumdar-Shaw is part of the Bangalore City Connect Foundation, a non-profit trust for discussion of civic issues, involving both urban stakeholders and the government. Mazumdar-Shaw is actively engaged in urban reform, partnering with Jana Urban Space Foundation and local government to improve roads. She is also involved in the Bangalore Political Action Committee (B.PAC), which is a not-for-profit organisation operating in Bengaluru.

After the 2009 flood, Biocon, Infosys and Wipro all committed to rebuilding homes for flood victims in north Karnataka. Biocon committed to building 3,000 houses at a cost of Rs 30 crore.

== Board memberships ==
Mazumdar-Shaw is a member of the board of governors of the Indian School of Business, a term member on the board of MIT, USA till 2023, and a past member of the board of governors of the Indian Institute of Technology Hyderabad.

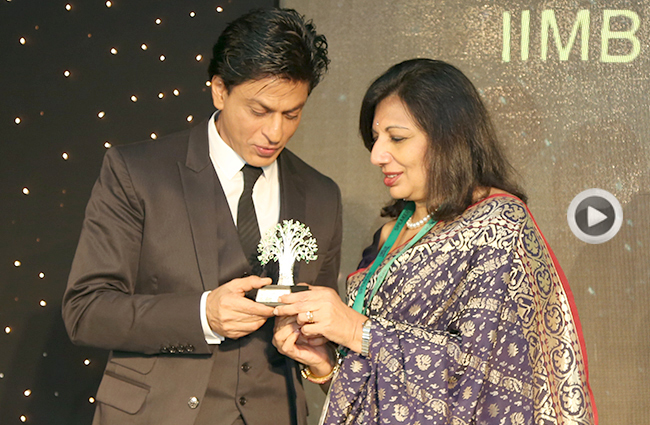
Dr Kiran Mazumdar-Shaw, Chairperson, Board of Governors, IIMB, with Shah Rukh Khan during IIMBUE 2015 on Dec 11

As of February 2014, Mazumdar-Shaw became the first woman to head the board of governors of the Indian Institute of Management Bangalore (IIMB).

She is an independent director on the board of Infosys. She is also a member of the General Body of Maharashtra State Innovation Society. She is also a member of the advisory board of the MIT Jameel Clinic.

Dr Kiran currently serves as an expert on the Brand Bengaluru Task Force committee, alongside notable members including politician and Bridge India Advisory Board Member, Rajeev Gowda. The committee comprises several officials and stakeholders who deliberate on issues including traffic, water supply and waste management that concern Bengaluru's development. The committee met on 17 June 2023 to chalk out a roadmap for the city development project, under the guidance of Karnataka's Deputy Chief Minister and Bengaluru Development Minister D.K. Shivakumar. The committee most recently met on 25 August 2023 to discuss Bengaluru's urban development blueprint.

== Awards and honours ==
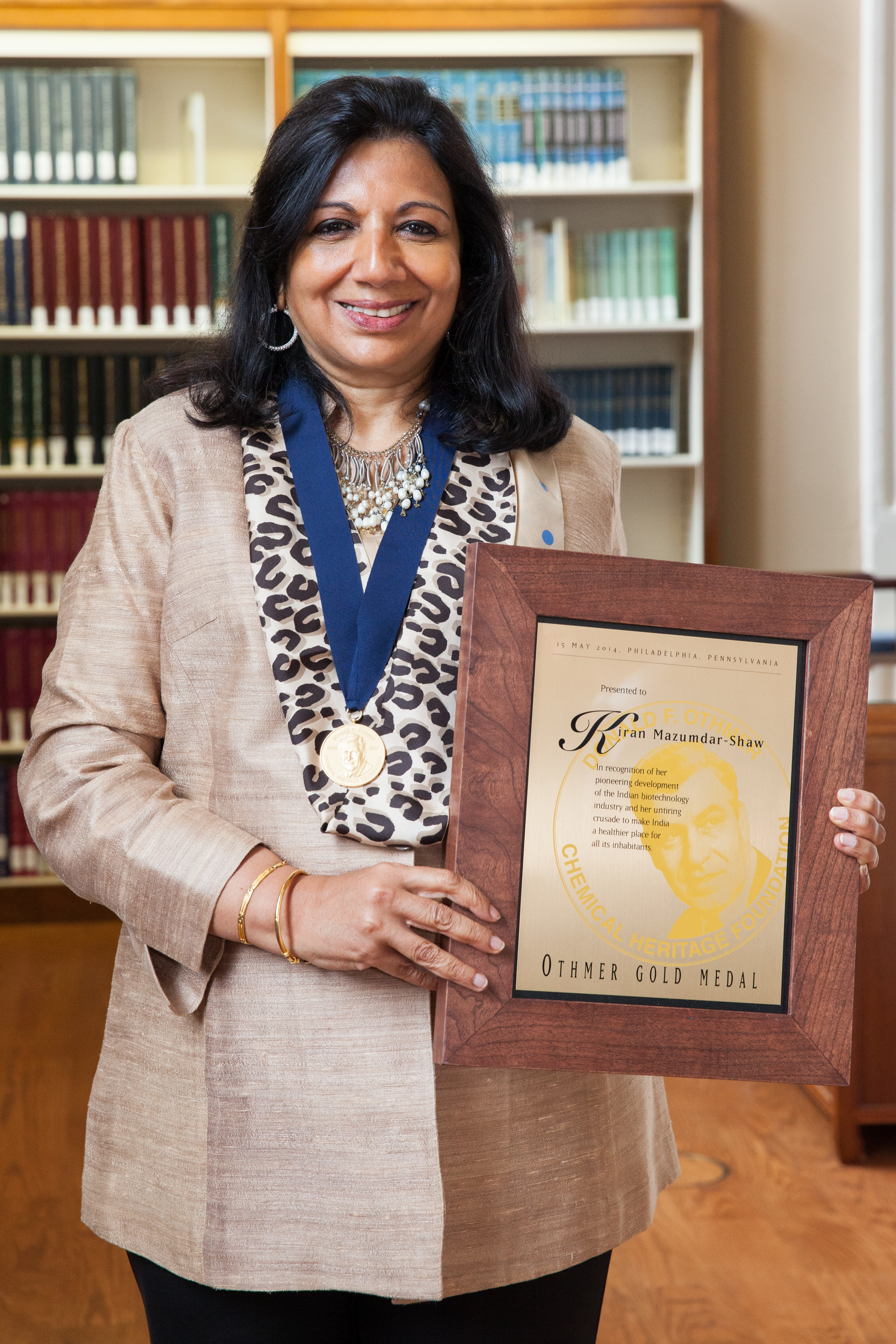
Mazumdar-Shaw with the Othmer Gold Medal, 2014

As of 2010, Mazumdar-Shaw was named among TIME magazine's 100 most influential people in the world. She is on the 2011 Financial Times' top 50 women in business list. As of 2014, she was listed as the 92nd most powerful woman in the world by Forbes. In 2015, she had risen to 85th in the Forbes ranking. She was voted global Indian of the year by Pharma Leaders Magazine in 2012.

She was placed #14th in the Hurun India Philanthropy List 2019 for a donation of ₹72 crore (US$7 million) and was ranked #2 in the list of Women Philanthropist of 2019, by the Hurun Report India Philanthropy List 2019.

=== International awards ===
Mazumdar-Shaw is the recipient of several international awards including the Othmer Gold Medal (2014) for outstanding contributions to the progress of science and chemistry,

-The Nikkei Asia Prize (2009) for regional growth, the ‘Veuve Clicquot Initiative For Economic Development For Asia' Award (2007),

-Ernst & Young Entrepreneur of the Year Award for Life Sciences & Healthcare (2002),

-'Technology Pioneer' recognition by World Economic Forum (2002).

-In May 2015 Federation University Australia (formerly the University of Ballarat) named a road in its Mt Helen campus as Mazumdar Drive. Kiran and Shaw attended the opening ceremony.

-She was the 2015 winner of Academy of International Business (AIB)The International Executive of the Year Award.

-In 2016 and again in 2020, she was named a laureate of the Asian Scientist 100 by the Asian Scientist.

-She was elected as a member of the United States National Academy of Engineering (NAE) in 2019 for the development of affordable biopharmaceuticals and the biotechnology industry in India. She is the first Indian woman to get this honor.

-In January 2020, Kiran became the fourth Indian citizen to be honoured with Australia's highest civilian honour.

-She was the 2020 EY World Entrepreneur of the year.

=== Indian awards ===
Her work in the biotechnology sector has earned her numerous national awards, including the Padma Shri (1989) and the Padma Bhushan (2005) from the government of India. She was given the Economic Times Award for 'Businesswoman of the Year' in 2004. At the Pharmaleaders Pharmaceutical Leadership Summit she was named "Global Indian Woman of the Year" (2012); she also received the Express Pharmaceutical Leadership Summit Award for "Dynamic Entrepreneur" in 2009. The Indian Merchants' Chamber Diamond Jubilee Endowment Trust's Eminent Businessperson of the Year Award was presented to Kiran Mazumdar-Shaw in 2006 by the Governor of Maharashtra, S. M. Krishna. She has also received the Indian Chamber of Commerce Lifetime Achievement Award (2005), the 'Corporate Leadership Award' by the American India Foundation (2005). and the Karnataka Rajyotsava Award (2002). She was honoured with the "H.K. Firodia Lifetime Achievement Award 2022" for her contributions to science and technology (2022).

=== Honorary degrees ===
Mazumdar-Shaw received an honorary doctorate from her alma mater, Ballarat University in 2004, in recognition of her contributions to biotechnology. She has been awarded honorary doctorates from the University of Abertay, Dundee, UK (2007), the University of Glasgow, UK (2008), Heriot-Watt University, Edinburgh, UK (2008) and University College Cork, Ireland (2012). She received an honorary doctorate from Davangere University, India, at its first convocation, July 2013, in recognition of her contribution in the field of biotechnology. She also received an Honorary Doctorate from Concordia University, Montreal, Canada in October of 2024

== Personal ==
Kiran Mazumdar Shaw was married to John Shaw, who died on 24 October 2022. Both were named in the 2021 Pandora Papers.
