= Biocon =

Indian multinational biopharmaceutical company

Biocon Limited

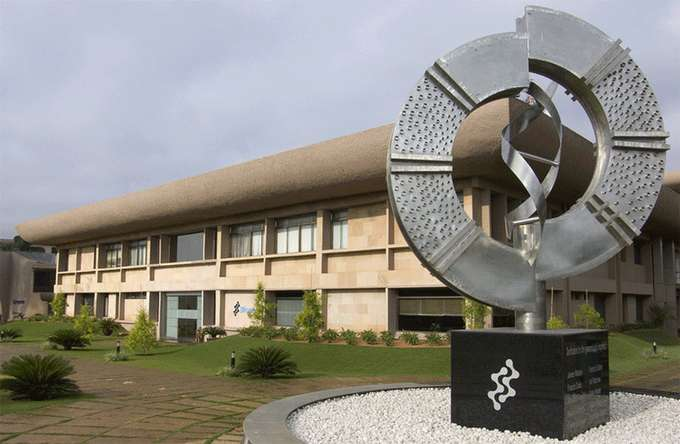
- Headquarters at Electronic City, Bangalore
- Type: Public
- Traded as: BSE: 532523; NSE: BIOCON
- ISIN: INE376G01013
- Industry: Biopharmaceutical; Biotechnology
- Founded: 1978 (48 years ago)
- Founder: Kiran Mazumdar-Shaw
- Headquarters: Bengaluru, Karnataka, India
- Key people: Kiran Mazumdar-Shaw (executive chairperson); Shreehas P Tambe (CEO & Managing Director, Biocon Limited)
- Products: Biologics; Small molecules; Branded formulations; Research services
- Revenue: ▲₹16,470 crore (US$1.8 billion) (2025)
- Operating income: ▲₹4,374 crore (US$470 million) (2025)
- Net income: ▼₹1,013 crore (US$110 million) (2025)
- Total assets: ▲₹58,797 crore (US$6.3 billion) (2025)
- Total equity: ▲₹27,712 crore (US$3.0 billion) (2025)
- Number of employees: 16,545 (March 2023)
- Subsidiaries: Biocon Biologics; Syngene International
- Website: www.biocon.com
- Footnotes; Financials as of 31 March 2025.

Biocon Limited is an Indian biopharmaceutical company based in Bengaluru, with U.S. headquarters in Bridgewater, New Jersey. Founded by Kiran Mazumdar-Shaw in 1978 as a partner to the Irish brewing enzyme manufacturer Biocon Biochemicals Ltd., the company manufactures generic active pharmaceutical ingredients (APIs) that are sold in approximately 120 countries, including the United States and Europe. It also manufactures novel biologics, and branded drugs such as biosimilar insulins and antibodies for the Indian domestic market. Biocon's biosimilar products are also sold in both bulk and formulation forms in several emerging markets.

Biocon's formulations for the Indian market include metabolics, oncology, immunotherapy, and nephrology products. Some of Biocon's key brands in India include INSUGEN (rh-insulin), BASALOG (Glargine), BIOMAb EGFR (Nimotuzumab), BLISTO (Glimepiride + Metformin), CANMAb (Trastuzumab), Evertor (Everolimus), TACROGRAF (Tacrolimus), ALZUMAb (Itolizumab) and KRABEVA (Bevacizumab).

Syngene International Limited (Syngene) is a publicly listed subsidiary of Biocon, operating in the contract research and development organization.

== History ==
Biocon was formed in 1978 as Biocon India Private Limited, an India-based partner to the existing Irish multinational brewing enzyme producer Biocon Biochemicals Ltd., with US$10,000 as startup capital from Mazumdar-Shaw. The subsidiary initially produced enzymes for the brewing market such as the papaya enzyme papain and the fish collagen extract Iisinglass, a clarifying agent used for some beers and wines. In 1979, Biocon became the first Indian company to manufacture and export enzymes to the US and Europe, and spent the 1980s producing an increasing share of pharmaceuticals for the domestic market.

=== Unilever ===
In 1989, Unilever acquired Biocon Biochemicals Ltd. in Ireland and merged it with its subsidiary Quest International. Unilever later sold its holdings to the Indian owners of Biocon Limited in 1998, effectively reuniting the partnered corporations.

=== Global market ===
During the 2000s, Biocon established its subsidiary Biocon Biologics and substantially grew its production of existing drugs for the American and European markets. Regulatory bodies such as the American Food and Drug Administration and various European state agencies (later the European Commission) have approved Biocon for production of many such products, starting with lovastatin in 2001. Biocon's production largely focused on generics, which as of 2022 had saved European healthcare systems some €30 billion in drug costs.

In the 2010s, Biocon began rapidly expanding its production and market reach. In 2008, Biocon acquired a 70% stake in German pharmaceutical company AxiCorp GmbH. The following year, Biocon established a partnered research facility in Bengaluru with American pharmaceutical corporation Bristol Myers Squibb, and announced a strategic collaboration with Mylan to enter the global generic biologics market. The following years saw a steady expansion of major Biocon production facilities in Asian nations, including Malaysia in 2010, and in Bangalone in 2016 with partner Amgen.

=== Novel biopharmaceuticals ===
Simultaneous to its significant increase in global market share, Biocon began increasing its development of biologics, which are more costly and technologically challenging to produce than small molecule drugs. Notable examples include the monoclonal antibodies (mAb) ALZUMAb for psoriasis in 2013, CANMAb to treat breast cancer in 2014, and the ledipasvir-sofosbuvir combination CIMIVIR-L for hepatitis C in 2015.

=== Biosimilars ===
Much of Biocon's current market share includes biosimilars, licensed versions of existing "innovator" products. Biosimilars are eligible for manufacture and sale after the expiration of the original product's patent protection. These are produced under its subsidiary Biocon Biologics. In 2016, it became the first Indian company to launch a biosimilar insulin glargine pen in Japan. In 2017, USFDA approved Mylan-Biocon's biosimilar for the cancer drug Herceptin. In 2018, Biocon and Mylan received the European Commission's approval to market the biosimilar insulin glargine. In 2022 a Biocon subsidiary, Biocon Biologics, bought the biosimilar assets of Viatris for $3.34 billion. In 2021, Biocon and Viatris received approval to launch Semglee, an insulin glargine-yfgn injection, the first interchangble biosimilar for diabetes in the United States. The same year, Biocon Biologics and Serum Institute of India formed a joint agreement to commercialise vaccines, biological drugs, and antibody therapies together. Another aspect of the deal involved Bicocon selling 15% of its biologics subsidiary to the Serum Institute of India, in return for Biocon gaining access to 100 million annual doses of vaccines for a 15-year period. In December 2025, Biocon discontinued its production of the low-cost insulin glargine biosimilar Semglee (insulin glargine-yfgn), causing a significant shortage of basal insulins in the United States as demand moved to other options, in particular Sanofi's Lantus.

=== Integration of Biocon Biologics ===
On 6 December 2025, Biocon announced that it would fully integrate its biosimilars subsidiary Biocon Biologics Limited (BBL) as a wholly owned subsidiary, in a corporate action that valued BBL at US$5.5 billion and marked a pivot away from a previously planned initial public offering (IPO) of the biosimilars business. The company said the integration would simplify the group's corporate structure, remove the holding-company discount that had weighed on its valuation, and combine its generics and biosimilars operations into a single listed entity focused on diabetes, oncology and immunology.

Under the plan, Biocon acquired the minority stakes held by Serum Institute Life Sciences, Tata Capital Growth Fund II and Activ Pine LLP through a share swap of 70.28 Biocon shares for every 100 BBL shares, priced at ₹405.78 per Biocon share. It also bought out the residual stake held by Mylan Inc. (Viatris) for US$815 million, comprising US$400 million in cash and US$415 million via a share swap, with the swap ratios based on independent valuations by EY. To fund the cash component payable to Viatris, Biocon raised approximately ₹4,150 crore (about US$460 million) through a qualified institutional placement (QIP) completed on 14 January 2026.

The integration was completed by 31 March 2026, making Biocon Biologics a wholly owned subsidiary of Biocon Limited and creating a unified entity spanning biosimilars, insulins, generics and peptides. The leadership transition that followed is described under Corporate governance.

== Corporate governance ==
As of July 2026, Biocon remains chaired by Mazumdar-Shaw. Effective 1 April 2026, Shreehas Tambe was appointed Chief Executive Officer and Managing Director of Biocon Limited—the first CEO of the integrated company following the full integration of Biocon Biologics Limited as a wholly owned subsidiary; Kedar Upadhye was appointed Chief Financial Officer. Tambe succeeded Siddharth Mittal, who resigned effective 31 March 2026 and moved to another leadership role within the Biocon Group. Mittal had led the company since December 2019, when he replaced CEO and Managing Director Arun Chandavarkar. In 2021, Christiane Hamacher resigned as CEO of Biocon Biologics India Limited, following differences with Mazumdar-Shaw. Hamacher had been appointed to that role in March 2019.

== Subsidiaries ==
=== Biocon Biologics ===
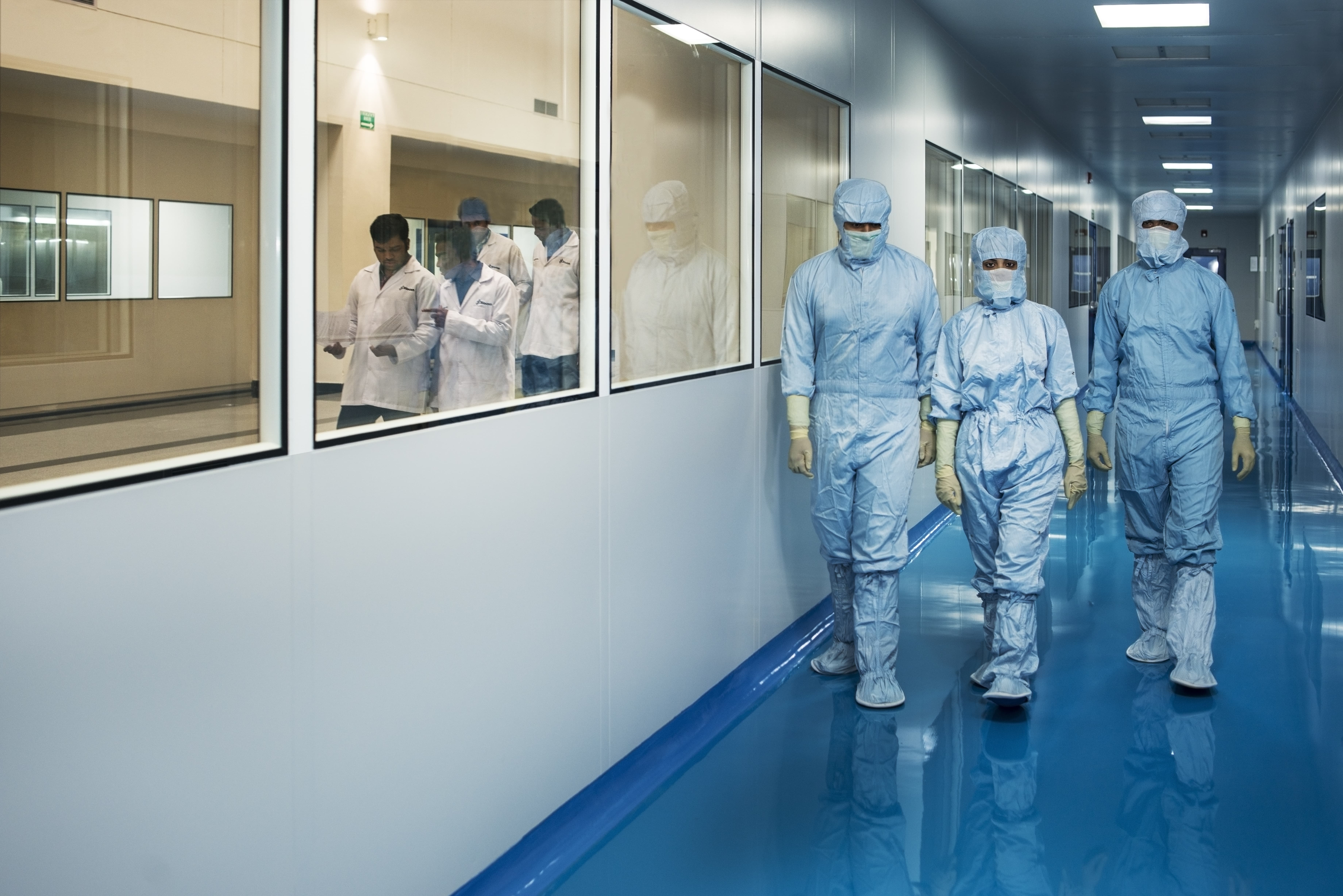
Inside Biocon Research Centre in Biocon Park, Bommasandra, Bangalore

Founded in 2000, Biocon Biologics is Biocon's biosimilar subsidiary and largest business component. In 2021, Biocon sold 15% of Biocon Biologics to Serum Institute of India for a valuation of $4.9 billion, for which Biocon will receive access to 100 million doses of vaccines per annum for 15 years. These vaccines will mainly be supplied from Serum Institute's upcoming vaccine facility in Pune, and Biocon will also have the commercialization rights of Serum Institute's vaccine portfolio, which includes the COVID-19 vaccine, for the international markets. In May 2022, Viatris sold its biosimilars division to Biocon Biologics for US$3.335 billion.

=== Syngene International Ltd ===
Established in 1993, Syngene International Limited is a contract research and development organization (CDMO). In the CDMO space, Syngene primarily focuses on research innovation and manufacturing services for their clients. The company has four divisions: drug discovery services, dedicated research centres, development devices and manufacturing. Syngene works with eight of the top 10 global pharma companies and, Syngene's clients include Amgen, Zoetis, GlaxoSmithKline and Bristol Myers Squibb. Syngene has been expanding its operations. Since 2020, the company has opened an R&D centre in Hyderabad, is building an API manufacturing facility in Mangalore, which was scheduled to be commissioned in 2022, and has expanded their R&D facility in Bangalore. Syngene also provides biologics CDMO services. In July 2022, Syngene signed a 10-year agreement with Zoetis to manufacture the drug substance for Librela (bedinvetmab), a first-in-class monoclonal antibody used for treating osteoarthritis in dogs. SynVent is Syngene's drug discovery and development platform for both small and large molecules. In September 2022, Biocon divested 5.4% of its shares in Syngene International. Clinigene International Limited is a subsidiary of Syngene offering international pharmaceutical majors Phase I-IV clinical trials and studies for novel/generic molecules.

=== Other subsidiaries ===
Biocon established Biocon Biopharmaceuticals Pvt. Ltd. (BBPL) in 2003 as a joint venture with the Cuban institute CIMAB to develop and market a range of monoclonal antibodies and cancer vaccines. In 2008, Biocon acquired a majority stake of 70% in AxiCorp GmbH, a German pharmaceutical marketing company. The same year, Biocon started NeoBiocon FZ LLC, a research and marketing pharmaceutical company based in Abu Dhabi. In 2023, Biocon purchased Biofusion Therapeutics Limited.

== Strategic partnerships ==
As a major developer and manufacturer in the international drug market, Biocon maintains partnerships with many corporations in the global pharmaceutical market. In 2004, Biocon began developing human antibodies BVX 10 and BVX-20 with US antibody producer, Vaccinex. BVX 10 targets TNF (Tumor Necrosis Factor) which is expressed at high levels in patients with rheumatoid arthritis. In 2007, Biocon and Abraxis BioScience, Inc. entered into an agreement that helped Biocon out-license the rights to develop and market a biosimilar version of GCSF (Granulocyte Colony-Stimulating Factor) to North American and European markets. In 2008, Biocon and IATRICa announced a partnership to co-develop immunoconjugates for targeted immunotherapy of cancers and infectious diseases, in particular T cell-mediated immunotherapy. In 2009, Biocon and Amylin Pharmaceuticals of the United States entered into an agreement to develop, commercialise and manufacture a novel peptide therapeutic for the potential treatment of diabetes. The same year, Biocon signed a collaboration agreement with Viatris to develop and commercialize generic biologics, with Viatris maintaining exclusive commercialisation rights in the US, Canada, Japan, Australia, New Zealand, EU, and European Free Trade Association countries through a profit-sharing arrangement. In January 2018, Sandoz (a Novartis division) announced a global partnership with Biocon to develop, manufacture, and commercialize multiple biosimilars in immunology and oncology for patients worldwide. Biocon maintains an agreement with Optimer Pharmaceuticals, a biopharmaceutical company focused on the treatment of serious infections such as Clostridioides difficile infection (CDI) for the commercial manufacturing of the antibiotic fidaxomicin.

== Facilities ==
Biocon's Indian manufacturing facilities are located at two sites in Bangalore, with several other sites primarily in Asia.
