= Vinayshil Gautam =

Indian academic

Prof. Vinayshil Gautam
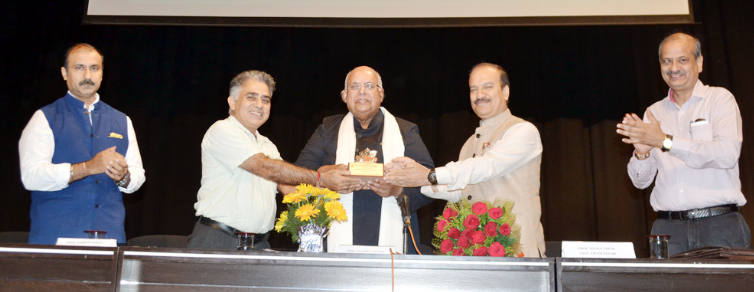
- Dr. Vinayshil Gautam in 2022 being felicitated at the University of Jammu
- Known for: Founder Director, IIM Kozhikode
- Awards: Bharat Gaurav Award (2003) All India Management Association, Economic Times Awards (2013)
- Scientific career
- Fields: Management Science, Project Management, Operations Research
- Institutions: Indian Institute of Technology, Delhi, IIM Kozhikode

Vinayshil Gautam FRAS is currently the Vice Chairman of Fore School of Management in New Delhi. Gautam previously served as the Founder Director of the Indian Institute of Management (IIM) Kozhikode and led the consulting team at IIM Shillong.

== Career ==
Dr. Gautam served as Founder Director of Indian Institute of Management Kozhikode and Leader of the Consulting Team at IIM, Shillong. During his tenure at IIT Delhi, he served as the first head of the 1st statutory Management Department.

Many governmental agencies, corporations, and departments have sought his advice. He served as visiting professor at University of Sussex, Brunel, Dominican, Minnesota, as well as Cambridge University, University of London, Toronto University, University of York and Duke University. He has been the visitor's (President of India) nominee to the BHU, the Vishwabharati Academic Council, and the Jammu University Council.

He served on the jury panel of BML Munjal awards.

== Awards ==
1. Awarded the Bharat Gaurav Award by the All India Management Association (2003)
2. Asian Regional Training and Development Organization (ARTDO) International Academic Excellence Award (2003).
3. Dewang Mehta lifetime award 2012.
4. Economic Times Awards Lifetime Achievement Award (2013).

== Books Authored ==
- Enterprise and Society: A Study of Some Aspects of Entrepreneurship and Management in India. Concept Publishing Company (1979).
- Management for Engineering Action. Sterling Publishing (1993).
- Technical entrepreneurship: Issues of Research and Applications. Allied Press (1995).
- Understanding Telecom Management. Concept Publishing Company (2004).
- Essays In Longitudinal Thinking Managing Change With Continuity, IJTD (2005).
- Organisation Development Systems. Concept Publishing Company (2011).
