= Ridlr =

Indian public transport commuting and ticketing app

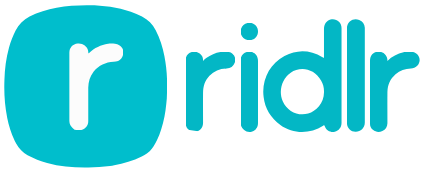
- Founded: 2012; 14 years ago in Mumbai, Maharashtra, India
- Founder: Brijraj Vaghani; Ravi Khemani
- Key people: Brijraj Vaghani (CEO); Ravi Khemani
- Products: Mobile app
- Website: ridlr.in

Ridlr is an Indian public transport commuting and ticketing app. It was founded in 2012. Ridlr allows commuters to access real-time information about the various modes of transportation. It also books tickets and tokens through the app with digital money.

Ridlr covers Mumbai and Delhi in association with BEST, Mumbai Metro and Delhi Metro. It also provides service for cities including Vijayawada, Hyderabad, Bengaluru, Ballari and Chennai.

== History ==
Ridlr was introduced in India in 2012 by Bird’s Eye Systems Private Limited for Delhi and Mumbai. The owners were Brijraj Vaghani and Ravi Khemani.

In April 2018 it was taken over by Ola.

After Mumbai, Ridlr added southern cities. The information services of the Ridlr app became available in Vijayawada, Hyderabad, Bengaluru, Ballari, Chennai, and other cities.

In 2015, the app transformed into a transactional app and associated with BEST and later with MBMT and NMMT. This permitted travelers to buy bus tickets as well as passes through the app.

In 2017, the app became an IoT service provider. This enabled customers to access the gates of Mumbai Metro. Travelling without the intervention of a physical ticket counter in the Mumbai Metro services was enabled. Online payment eradicated the need for standing in a queue.

During demonetization, the cash crunch was eased by this app.

64 Ridlr employees joined Ola to support the association. The Mumbai-based setup will be led by Vaghani.

The user journey during the initial days of 2014 through the app was:

- Initial and final destinations
- Real-time data regarding the various modes of transport
- User choice of transport mode

== Funding ==
- Series A funding was received from Matrix Partners in December 2013 and Qualcomm Ventures in September 2014.
- Series B funding came from Times Internet, Qualcomm Ventures, and Matrix Ventures, reaching $6 million.
