= Sumant Sinha =

Indian businessman

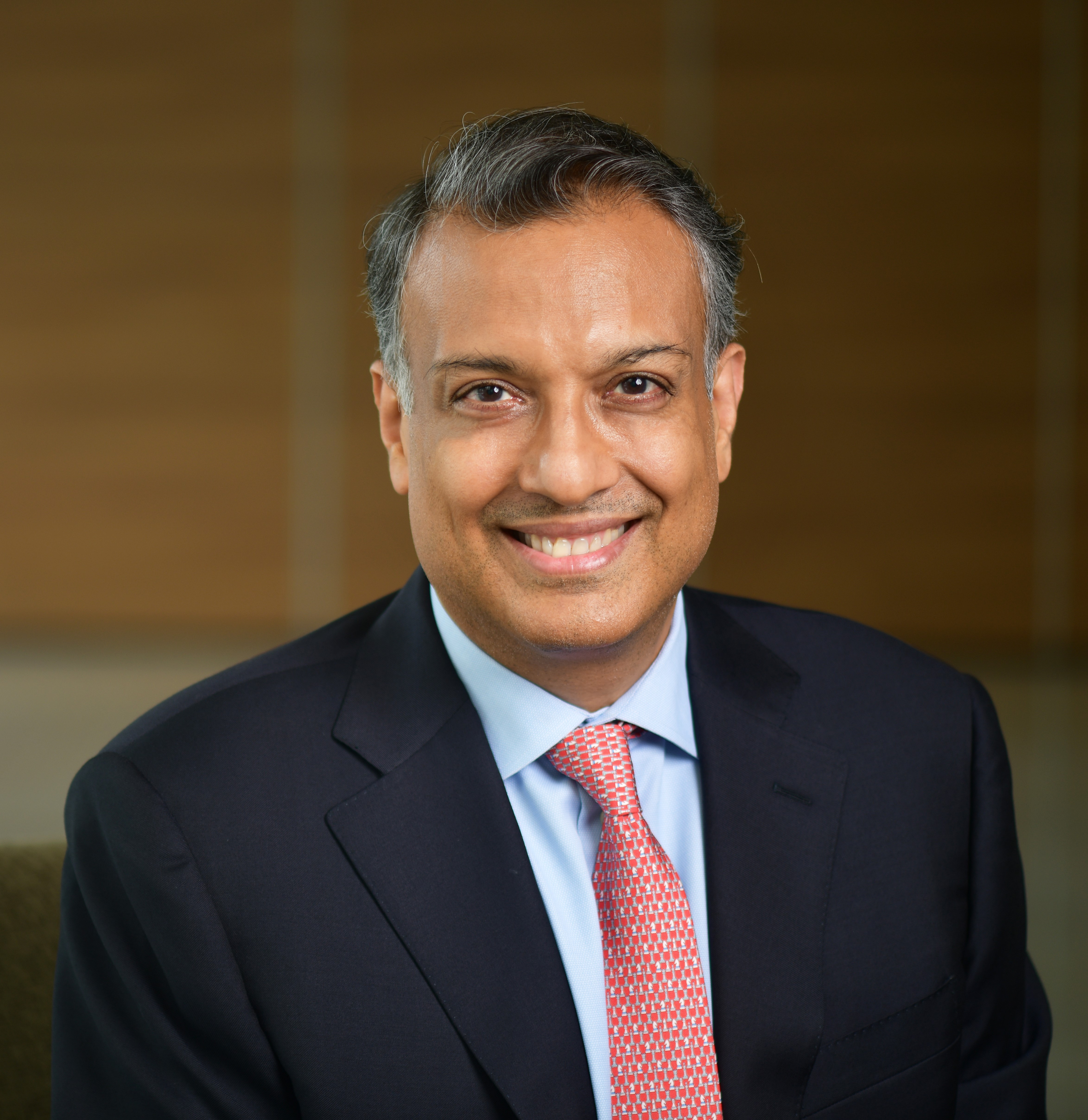
- Born: 12 February 1965 (age 61); New Delhi, India
- Education: Indian Institute of Technology Delhi; Indian Institute of Management Calcutta; Columbia University
- Occupation: Businessman
- Title: Founder, Chairman & CEO, ReNew Energy Global
- Spouse: Vaishali Nigam Sinha
- Children: 2
- Parent(s): Yashwant Sinha, Nilima Sinha

Sumant Sinha (born 12 February 1965) is an Indian businessman and the founder and chief executive officer of ReNew Energy Global, an Indian renewable energy company. Sinha previously held senior corporate roles at Aditya Birla Group and Suzlon before establishing ReNew in 2011.

== Early life and education ==
Sinha was born in New Delhi, India. He is the son of Yashwant Sinha, a former Indian Administrative Service officer who was Indian finance and external affairs minister, and Nilima Sinha, a children's book author.

He earned a Bachelor of Technology degree in civil engineering from the Indian Institute of Technology Delhi in 1987 and a Post Graduate Diploma in Management from the Indian Institute of Management Calcutta in 1989. In 1992, he received a Master of International Affairs degree in international finance and economic policy from Columbia University's School of International and Public Affairs. He is also a CFA charterholder.

== Career ==
=== Early career ===
Sinha began his career with Tata Administrative Services. After completing his postgraduate studies at Columbia University, he worked in international investment banking from 1992 to 2002. He held positions at Citicorp Securities in New York and later was a managing director in capital markets at ING Barings in London. In 2002, Sinha returned to India and joined the Aditya Birla Group as group chief financial officer. During his tenure, he was involved in the group's acquisition of Novelis by Hindalco Industries in 2007 and its acquisition of a controlling stake in Idea Cellular. From 2007 to 2008, he was chief executive officer of Aditya Birla Retail.

In 2008, Sinha joined wind turbine manufacturer Suzlon Energy as chief operating officer. He left the company in 2010.

=== ReNew Energy Global ===
In January 2011, Sinha founded ReNew Power, which later became ReNew Energy Global plc, with financial backing from Goldman Sachs. The company developed utility-scale renewable energy projects in India, initially focusing on wind power and later expanding into solar energy. Its first commercial project, a 25.2 MW wind power facility in Jasdan, Gujarat, was commissioned in May 2012.

During Sinha's tenure, ReNew expanded its renewable energy portfolio in India. In August 2021, the company became a publicly listed entity on the Nasdaq following a business combination with RMG Acquisition Corporation II, a special-purpose acquisition company. The transaction valued ReNew at approximately $8 billion.

== Affiliations and industry leadership ==
Sinha was president of the Associated Chambers of Commerce and Industry of India (ASSOCHAM) for the 2022–2023 term. Since 2024, he has was co-chair of the World Economic Forum's Alliance of CEO Climate Leaders.

Sinha was recognised as a distinguished alumnus of the Indian Institute of Technology Delhi, the Indian Institute of Management Calcutta and Columbia University School of International and Public Affairs (SIPA).

== Publications ==
Sinha is the author of Fossil Free: Reimagining Clean Energy in a Carbon-Constrained World.

== Awards and recognition ==
- 2017: Received the Ernst & Young Entrepreneur of the Year Award.
- 2018: Received the Economic Times Entrepreneur of the Year Award.
- 2021: Recognized as a UN Global Compact SDG Pioneer by the United Nations Global Compact.
- 2024: Named to the TIME Climate 100 list.

== Personal life ==
Sinha is married to Vaishali Nigam Sinha, with whom he co-founded ReNew. Vaishali Nigam Sinha is the president of the United Nations Global Compact Network India for the 2025–2027 term.
