= Shree Renuka Sugars =

India's largest sugar refiner

Shree Renuka Sugars Ltd.
- Type: Public company
- Traded as: BSE: 532670; NSE: RENUKA
- Industry: Sugar
- Founded: 1998
- Founders: Narendra Murkumbi & Vidya Murkumbi
- Headquarters: Belagavi, Karnataka, India
- Key people: Atul Chaturvedi (Executive Chairman)
- Revenue: ▲₹100,876.0 million (US$1.0 billion)
- Net income: ▲₹10,087.0 million (US$100 million)
- Owner: Wilmar Sugar Holdings Pte. Ltd.
- Website: Official Website

Shree Renuka Sugars Ltd. is India's largest sugar refiner and ethanol producer based in Mumbai, Maharashtra, with refining capacity of 4000 tonnes/day and distillery capacity of 600 kilolitre/day. It accounted for 20% of India's international sugar contribution in 2019.
