= Narayanan Vaghul =

Indian banker (1936–2024)

- Born: 1936; Madras, British India
- Died: 18 May 2024 (aged 88); Chennai, India
- Occupation: Banker
- Honours: Padma Bhushan (2010)

Narayanan Vaghul (1936 – 18 May 2024) was an Indian banker and philanthropist, who served as chairman and managing director of ICICI Bank, one of India's largest private sector banks. He was a recipient of the Padma Bhushan, India's third highest civilian honour, in 2010.

== Early life ==
Vaghul was born in Madras (present-day Chennai) in then British India in 1936. He was second in a family of eight children. He studied at Ramakrishna Mission School and graduated from Loyola College, Madras University in the with a Bachelor of Commerce degree with honours in 1956. In a later interview, he would say that while he wanted to pursue a career in the Indian civil services, he missed the application due to an age cutoff.

== Career ==
Vaghul started his career with the State Bank of India (SBI), an Indian public sector bank, as a probationary officer. During his time at the bank, he was mentored by then chairman of the bank R. K. Talwar. He later moved to the National Institute of Bank Management, after serving 19 years at SBI. He later became the director there before joining Central Bank of India, another public sector bank, in 1978. In 1981, he was appointed the chairman and managing director of Bank of India.

Vaghul was appointed as the chairman and managing director of the Industrial Credit and Investment Corporation of India, which was then still a government-controlled public finance institution, in 1985 by prime minister Rajiv Gandhi. He led the corporation's transformation into India's largest private-sector bank taking the name ICICI Bank. He retired in 1996, but remained as its non-executive chairman until 2009. In addition to driving the transformation at the Bank, his time at ICICI was noted for grooming of leaders, including K. V. Kamath, Kalpana Morparia, Shikha Sharma, and Nachiket Mor, many of whom went on to lead other public and private sector financial institutions.

Vaghul served as a director on the board of many companies including Wipro Technologies, Mahindra & Mahindra, Apollo Hospitals and Mittal Steel Company. He was also the chairman of Mahindra World City, Chennai, when it was set up as one of the first special economic zones in India, and was the first chairman of financial services company CRISIL. He was also chairman of Pratham from 1996-2007 helping the organisation to scale across India.

Vaghul was awarded the Padma Bhushan, India's third highest civilian honour, in the trade and industry category in 2010. He won several other awards including Business Man of the Year (1991) from Business India and a lifetime achievement award from The Economic Times. He was also the Chairman of Give India, one of India's NGOs.

Vaghul received the award of Corporate Catalyst—Forbes Philanthropy award in 2012 for his active involvement and assisting philanthropic causes.

== Personal life ==
Vaghul was married to Padma Vaghul and had two children—a son, Mohan, and a daughter, Sudha.

Vaghul died on 18 May 2024, at the age of 88.
