= ReNew Energy Global =

Indian renewable energy company

ReNew Energy Global plc
- Type: Public
- Traded as: Nasdaq: RNW
- Industry: Renewable energy
- Founded: January 19, 2011; 15 years ago
- Founder: Sumant Sinha
- Headquarters: Gurgaon, Haryana, India
- Area served: India
- Key people: Sumant Sinha (chairman and CEO) Vaishali Nigam Sinha (Co-founder) Kailash Vaswani (CFO)
- Products: Wind power, Solar power, Solar rooftop power, Hydroelectric power
- Revenue: ▲₹15,063 crore (US$1.6 billion) (2026)
- Operating income: ▲₹9,850.3 crore (US$1.0 billion) (2026)
- Net income: ▲₹1,038.5 crore (US$110 million) (2026)
- Owners: CPP Investments; ADIA; JERA; Others
- Website: renew.com

ReNew Energy Global (formerly ReNew Power) is an Indian renewable energy company based in Gurgaon. The company was listed on Nasdaq in August 2021 following a merger with a special-purpose acquisition company. ReNew operates more than 150 projects spread across ten states in India.

== History ==
ReNew was founded on January 19, 2011, by Sumant Sinha. Goldman Sachs invested in the company in September that year. In 2023, Goldman Sachs exited the company completely.

In May 2012, the company commissioned a 25.2-megawatt wind power project in Jasdan, Gujarat, was inaugurated by Narendra Modi, then Chief Minister of Gujarat. In 2016, ReNew’s generation capacity reached 1 gigawatt (GW). In 2017, the company commissioned a 510 MW solar facility in Telangana.

In February 2021, ReNew announced plans to merge with RMG Acquisition Corporation II, a special-purpose acquisition company, in a transaction valuing ReNew at approximately US$8 billion, including debt. The company was listed on the NASDAQ on 24 August 2021 under the symbol ‘RNW’.

As of December 2025, ReNew had approximately 19.2 gigawatts (GW) of operational and planned projects, of which 11.4 GW had been commissioned. In December 2025, Masdar withdrew from a consortium seeking to acquire ReNew Energy Global and take it private.

== Operations ==
In 2019, ReNew partnered with South Korean company GS E&C to develop the SECI-4 project in Rajasthan. In 2020, it announced plans to manufacture solar cells and modules in India.

In 2020, ReNew was included in the World Economic Forum’s Global Lighthouse Network. During the same year, the company was awarded a project under the Indian government’s first round-the-clock renewable energy tender. In 2022, ReNew generated 14,263 GWh of electricity. That year, it signed an agreement to develop a green hydrogen plant in Egypt.

ReNew generated 17,385 gigawatt-hours (GWh) of electricity in 2023. Its gross renewable energy assets exceeded 10 gigawatts (GW) in the 2023–24 financial year.

By June 2025, ReNew’s total renewable energy portfolio reached approximately 18.5 GW following the signing of power purchase agreements covering an additional 1.2 GW. In November that year, the company signed an agreement with the Government of Andhra Pradesh for a proposed ₹60,000 crore investment in renewable energy projects.

ReNew was selected under the Indian government’s Production Linked Incentive scheme for high-efficiency solar photovoltaic modules. As of 2026, it had annual solar module manufacturing capacity of 6.5 GW and solar cell manufacturing capacity of 2.5 GW. The company planned to increase its annual solar cell manufacturing capacity to 6.5 GW by December 2026.

== Funding ==
Goldman Sachs invested in ReNew in 2011. In 2016, the company issued rupee-denominated masala bonds. JERA, a joint venture between Tokyo Electric Power and Chubu Electric Power, acquired an equity stake in ReNew in 2017.

In 2019, It raised $450 million through dollar bonds to retire some of its existing debt. The same year, the Abu Dhabi Investment Authority (ADIA) invested $100 million into ReNew via rights issue.

In 2021, ReNew announced that it would go public through its merger with a SPAC called RMG Acquisition Corporation II. The merged company was to be called ReNew Energy Global PLC and listed on NASDAQ. ReNew was listed on the NASDAQ on 24 August 2021 under the symbol ‘RNW’. In 2023, Goldman Sachs sold its remaining stake to the Canada Pension Plan Investment Board (CPPIB). Same year, Norway’s Climate Investment Fund, managed by Norfund, and pension fund KLP invested ₹900 million in ReNew’s transmission project in Karnataka.

== Project locations ==
ReNew has a portfolio of more than 19.2 GW located in ten states of India.

State	Installed Solar Capacity
Karnataka	2.317 GW
Telangana	0.1 GW
Rajasthan	6.1 GW
Madhya Pradesh	101.2 MW
Tamil Nadu	150 MW
Andhra Pradesh	777 MW
Gujarat	5 GW
Maharashtra	1.068 GW

== Awards ==
- 2017: Infrastructure Company of the Year by VCCircle.
- 2023: ReNew received the Terra Carta Seal from the Sustainable Markets Initiative.
- 2024: ReNew was recognized twice as a Lighthouse by the World Economic Forum for its renewable energy initiatives.
- 2025: ReNew was included in MIT Technology Review's list of Top 15 Climate Tech Companies to watch.
- 2026: ReNew won TIME World’s Top Greentech companies.

== See also ==
- Astonfield
- Solar Energy Corporation of India
- Solar power in India
