= Ola Electric =

Indian electric scooter manufacturer

Ola Electric Mobility Limited

- A OLA Electric shop in Bengaluru (2026)
- Type: Public
- Traded as: NSE: OLAELEC; BSE: 544225
- Industry: Electric vehicles
- Founded: 2017; 9 years ago
- Founder: Bhavish Aggarwal
- Headquarters: Bengaluru, Karnataka, India
- Area served: India (except Goa since 2025)
- Key people: Bhavish Aggarwal (CEO); Anand Shah (Co-founder)
- Products: S1 X S1 X+ S1 Pro; S1 Pro+ Roadster X Roadster X+
- Production output: ▲329,000 (FY24)
- Services: Motor vehicle manufacturing; Motor vehicle distribution; Charging solutions; EV batteries
- Revenue: ▲₹5,009 crore (US$520 million) (FY24)
- Net income: ▲₹−1,584 crore (US$−160 million) (FY24)
- Owners: Bhavish Aggarwal (30.02%); SoftBank (17.83%); Tiger Global (4.90%); Ola Consumer (3.64%)
- Number of employees: 3,733 (October 2023)
- Subsidiaries: Ola Cell Technologies
- Website: olaelectric.com

Ola Electric Mobility Limited is an Indian electric vehicle manufacturer headquartered in Bengaluru. Founded in 2017 by Bhavish Aggarwal, the company designs and manufactures electric two-wheelers, including the Ola S1 in three variants named Ola S1 Air, Ola S1X and S1 Pro. It has its manufacturing facility located in Krishnagiri, Tamil Nadu.

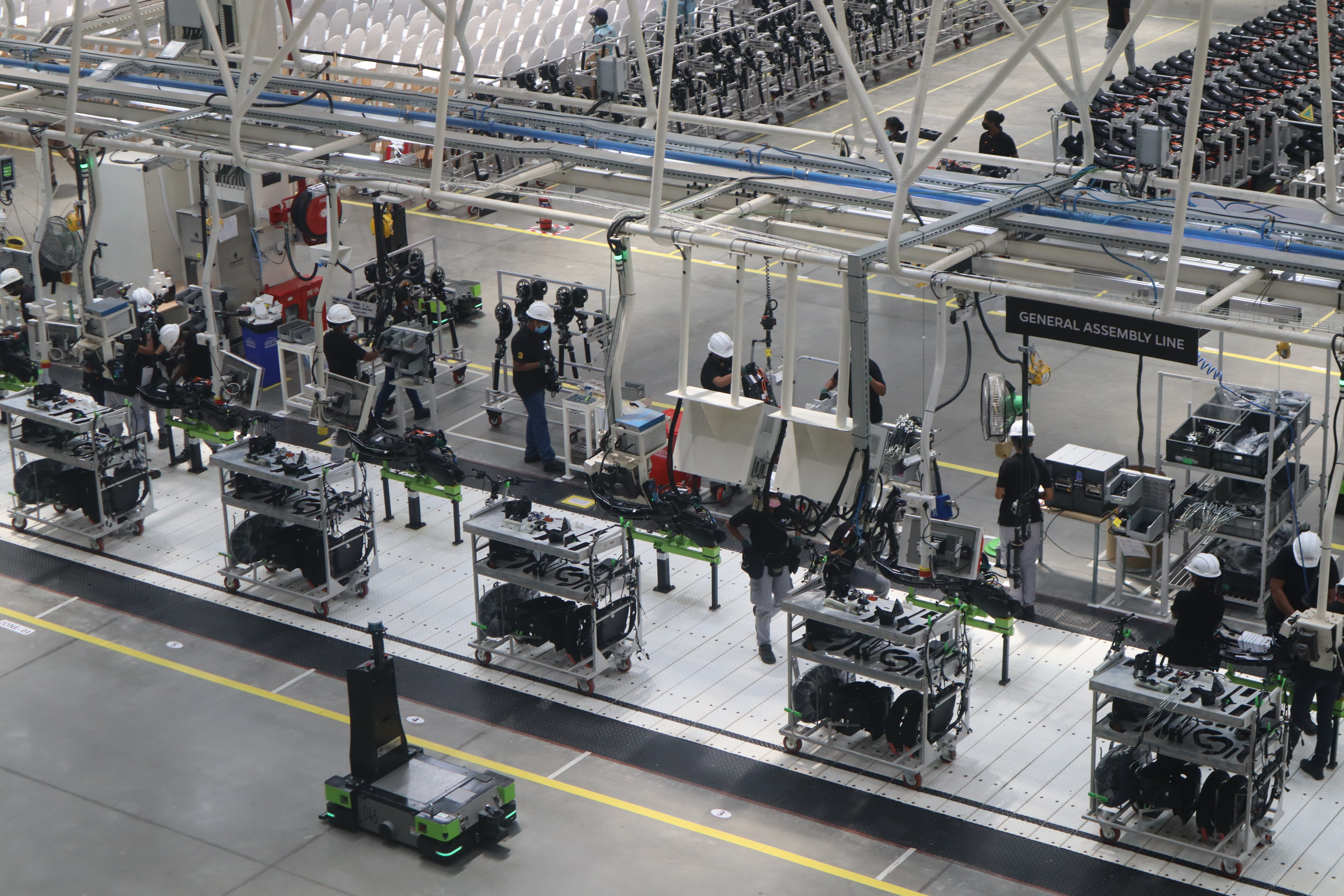
Ola Futurefactory, in Krishnagiri, Tamil Nadu (2022)

The company also produces battery cells at its manufacturing facility in Tamil Nadu, which supplies energy storage products for its vehicles and other applications. As of 2023, the company led the electric scooter market in India, with a 30% share.

== History ==
=== 2017–2019 ===
Ola Electric was established in 2017 as a wholly owned subsidiary of ANI Technologies, the parent entity of Ola Cabs. The company was started to reduce emission and fuel dependency of Ola's cabs, and shift to mass electric mobility; a pilot program was launched in Nagpur in May 2017 by setting up charging stations across the city and procuring electric cabs, e-buses, and e-rickshaws from OEM partners. In April 2018, it announced that it aims to have 1 million electric vehicles in its cab service by 2022.

Between December 2018 and January 2019, founder Bhavish Aggarwal bought a 92.5% stake in Ola Electric from ANI Technologies at a valuation of ₹1 lakh (about US$1,400 then), and Ola Electric was spun-off as a separate entity. ANI Technologies continued to hold a 7.5% stake in Ola Electric for allowing the use of "Ola" brand name.

In February 2019, Ola Electric raised US$56 million from Tiger Global and Matrix India. The company announced on 6 May 2019 that Ratan Tata had invested an undisclosed amount in Ola Electric as part of its Series A round of funding. It raised $250 million from SoftBank during Series B round funding in July 2019, at a valuation of over $1 billion.

=== 2020–present ===
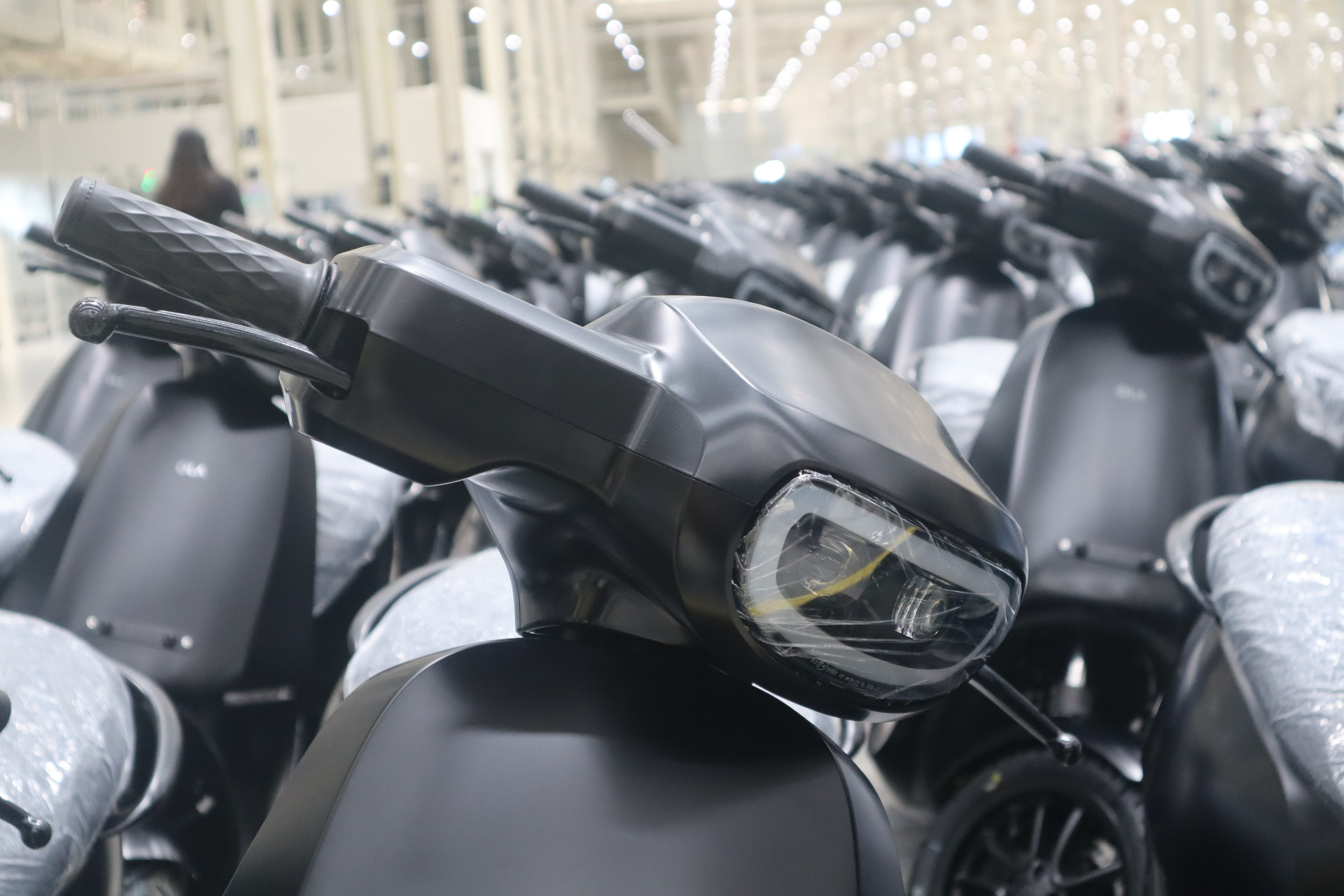
Ola scooters fresh out of assembly line

In May 2020, Ola Electric acquired Etergo, an Amsterdam-based crowdfunded electric scooter manufacturer, for €3.75 million in a distress sale. Ola Electric announced that it would launch its own line of electric scooters in India by 2021.

In December 2020, the company announced its plan to set up the world's largest two wheeler factory (called the Future Factory) in Tamil Nadu at a cost of ₹2,400 crore (US$323.89 million) after signing a memorandum with the Government of Tamil Nadu. It acquired a 500-acre land in Pochampalli, Krishnagiri District in January 2021; the construction work for the factory began in late February.

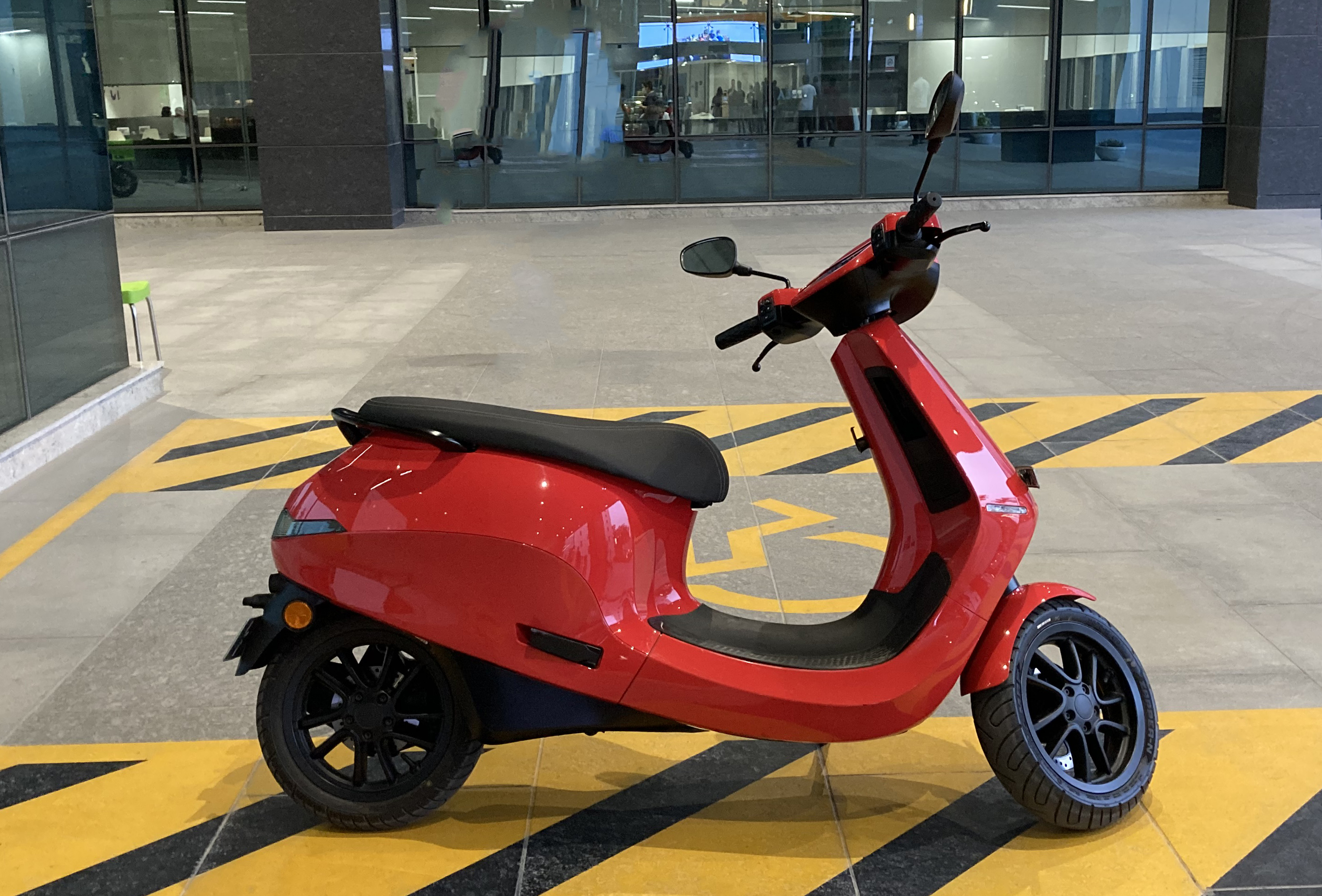
OLA S1 Pro Gen 1 Electric Scooter

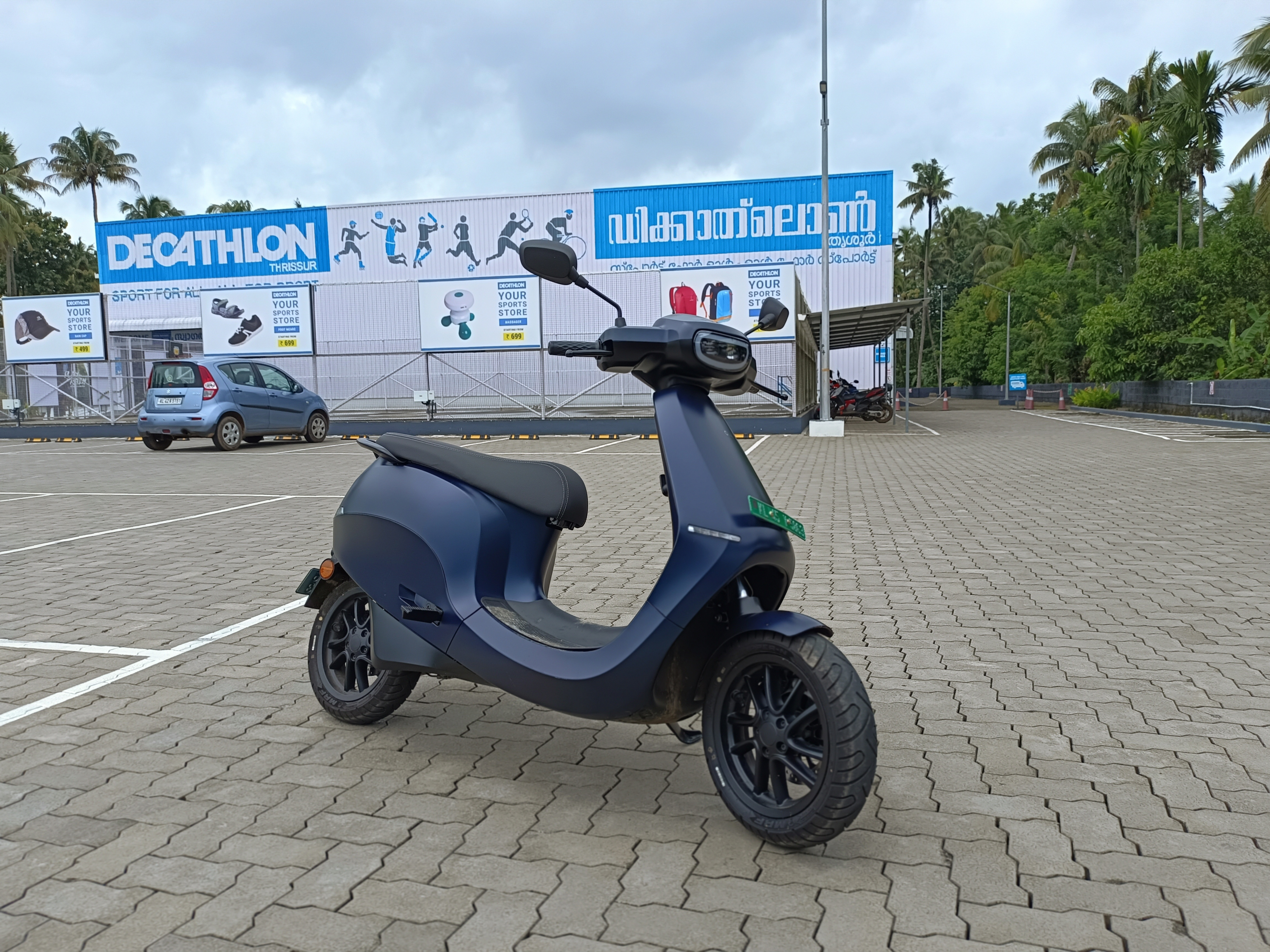
Ola electric scooter

Ola Electric received 500,000 bookings for scooters in the first month of availability.

Ola Electric started delivering its S1 and S1 Pro models in December 2021 with the deliveries of 100 scooters in Bengaluru and Chennai, although some promised features were not enabled in initial deliveries.

Ola Electric raised more than $200 million from Falcon Edge, SoftBank Group and others at a valuation of $3 billion in September 2021. In December the same year, it raised $53 million in an investment round led by Singaporean investment firm, Temasek. In January 2022, Ola Electric raised US$200 million from multiple investors at a valuation of US$5 billion.

In late March 2022, Ola made a strategic investment in Israel-based battery technology company StoreDot to incorporate and manufacture its XFC (extreme fast charging) battery technologies for future vehicles in India. In the wake of a fire incident in its scooter in Pune on 26 March, the company recalled a batch of 1,441 scooters in April as a "pre-emptive measure".

On 20 June 2022, Ola Electric teased its first sedan electric car. However, two years later, the company scrapped its plan to launch electric cars, choosing to focus on electric scooters and motorcycles.

In July 2022, Aggarwal announced that the company was building Battery Innovation Center (BIC) in Bangalore, which would be Asia's largest cell R&D facility, with an investment of $500 million.

In October 2023, the company raised $140 million in equity and $240 million in debt, at a valuation of $5.4 billion, to set up a lithium-ion battery manufacturing facility in Tamil Nadu called Ola Gigafactory.

On 2 August 2024, Ola Electric launched its initial public offering (IPO) and raised ₹5,500 crore. Existing investors, including founder Aggarwal, sold 84.9 million shares in the IPO.

On 15 August 2024, Ola Electric unveiled the prototype of its first electric motorcycle series, named Roadster, which was announced to be launched in three variants in 2025. In September 2024, Aggarwal announced that Ola Electric will unveil its electric three-wheeler later that year.

In May 2026, the company received regulatory approval for a new electric scooter with a top speed around 70kmph.

== Production ==
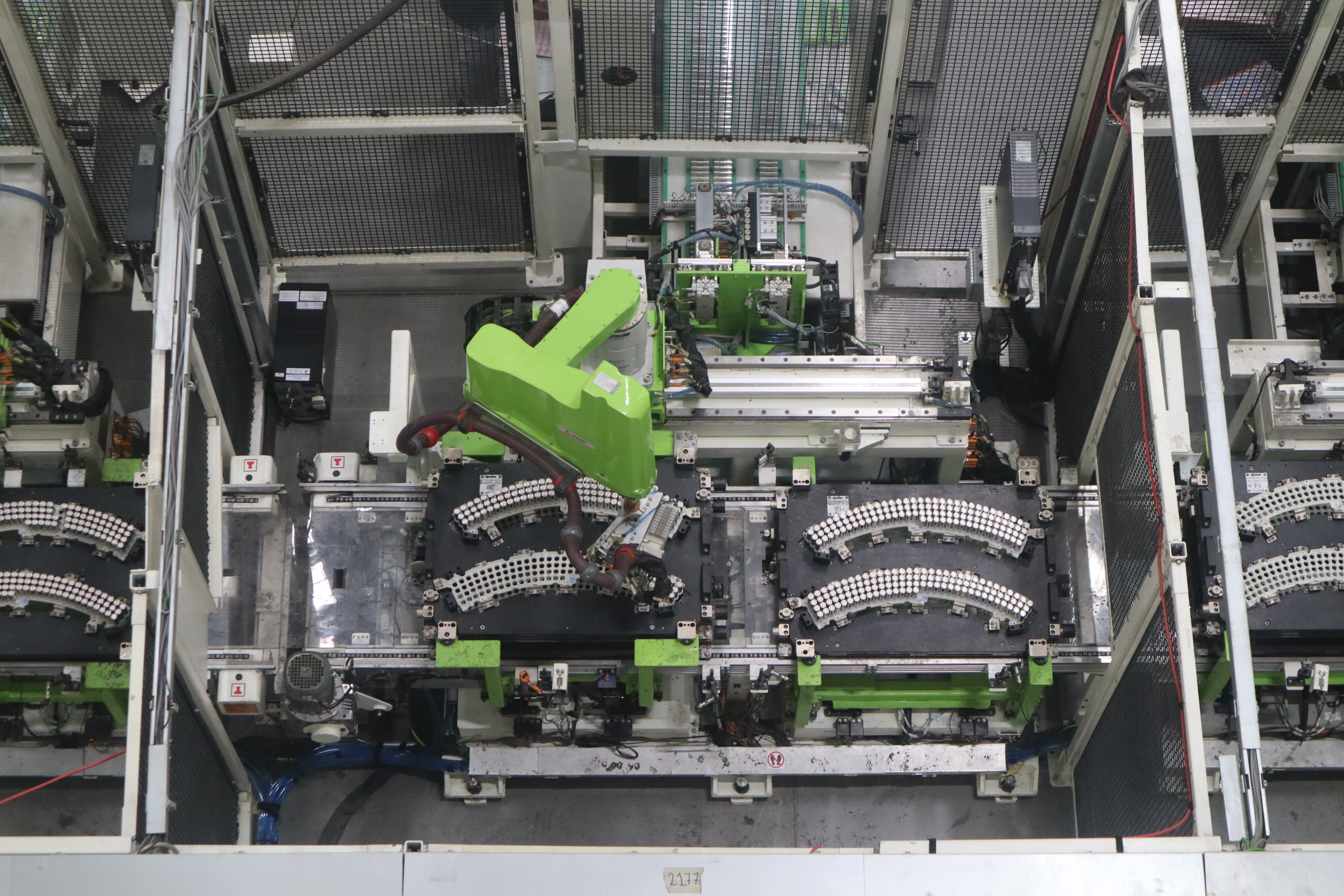
Ola scooter assembly line

Ola Electric operates a 500-acre automated complex, called the Ola Future Factory, in Pochampalli, Tamil Nadu. It has deployed automated robots in its welding and painting lines, and battery and motor assembly lines. In 2021, it announced that it would employ only female workers on its manufacturing floor. The first electric scooter was manufactured on 15 August 2021. By January 2022, it was producing nearly a thousand electric scooters daily.

As of 2024, Ola Electric sources batteries for its electric scooters from LG Energy Solution and CATL. The company has announced that it would transition to using batteries from its own manufacturing facility, the Ola Gigafactory in Pochampalli, which is anticipated to commence commercial production of lithium-ion batteries in 2025.

== Reception ==
In 2022, reports surfaced about a hostile work culture within the company.

In March 2023, following criticism over safety defects in its front fork design, Ola Electric announced that it would replace the front fork arms of its S1 and S1 Pro series scooters at no cost.

In a 2024 presentation, Ola's CEO stated that the company is the world's largest electric two-wheeler manufacturer with a fine print reading "excluding China". Commentators noted that the world's five largest electric two-wheeler companies are all Chinese, having a combined global market share of 72%, and debunked other misleading claims in the presentation.

In August 2024, Ola Electric was criticized for plagiarism after it used a competitor's advertising photographs with Ola Electric motorcycles substituted for those of the competitor.

In September 2024, a disgruntled Ola customer set fire to a showroom in protest of poor servicing of his newly bought scooter. In October 2024, the Central Consumer Protection Authority issued a show-cause notice to Ola Electric concerning more than 10,000 unaddressed customer complaints related to quality and after-sales service in a year.

In October 2025, an FIR was filed against Aggarwal and a few Ola Electric executives by the Bengaluru police with an employee's September 2025 suicide over workplace harassment and non-payment of dues as per his suicide note. However, the company claimed that the employee never reported any problems during his tenure and challenged the FIR in the Karnataka High Court. They also sought a motion to dismiss the FIR, calling the suicide note fabricated, but it was found to be authentic based on a forensic examination.

== See also ==
- TVS iQube Electric
- Ather Energy
- Okinawa Autotech
- Gogoro
- Electric vehicle industry in India
- Plug-in electric vehicles in India
