= CD6 =

Human protein

Identifiers
- Aliases: CD6, TP120, CD6 molecule
- External IDs: OMIM: 186720; MGI: 103566; GeneCards: CD6
Available structures
PDB	Ortholog search: PDBe RCSB
PDB	List of PDB id codes 5A2E

Gene location (Human)
Chr.	Chromosome 11 (human)
Band	11q12.2	Start	60,971,680 bp
Band	11q12.2	End	61,020,377 bp

Gene location (Mouse)
Chr.	Chromosome 19 (mouse)
Band	19 A|19 7.16 cM	Start	10,766,705 bp
Band	19 A|19 7.16 cM	End	10,807,422 bp
RNA expression pattern
Bgee	Human / Mouse (ortholog); Top expressed in: granulocyte; lymph node; blood; thymus; appendix; spleen; cervix epithelium; superficial temporal artery; bone marrow; endothelial cell / Top expressed in: thymus; mesenteric lymph nodes; blood; granulocyte; embryo; axillary lymph node; subcutaneous adipose tissue; embryo; spleen; morula; More reference expression data
BioGPS	n/a
Gene ontology
Molecular function	lipopolysaccharide binding; lipoteichoic acid binding; scavenger receptor activity; protein binding; identical protein binding
Cellular component	integral component of membrane; membrane; intrinsic component of plasma membrane; plasma membrane; integral component of plasma membrane; T cell receptor complex; extracellular region; immunological synapse; external side of plasma membrane
Biological process	positive regulation of cytokine production involved in inflammatory response; heterophilic cell-cell adhesion via plasma membrane cell adhesion molecules; adaptive immune response; immune system process; acute inflammatory response to antigenic stimulus; receptor-mediated endocytosis; response to lipopolysaccharide; cell adhesion; positive regulation of T cell proliferation; innate immune response; immunological synapse formation; lipopolysaccharide-mediated signaling pathway; vesicle-mediated transport; endocytosis
Sources:Amigo / QuickGO
Orthologs
Databases	NCBI: entry; OMA: entry
Species	Human	Mouse
Entrez	923	12511
Ensembl	ENSG00000013725	ENSMUSG00000024670
UniProt	P30203	Q61003
RefSeq (mRNA)	NM_001254750; NM_001254751; NM_006725	NM_001037801; NM_009852
RefSeq (protein)	NP_001241679; NP_001241680; NP_006716	NP_001032890; NP_033982
Location (UCSC)	Chr 11: 60.97 – 61.02 Mb	Chr 19: 10.77 – 10.81 Mb
PubMed search
- Wikidata
View/Edit Human	View/Edit Mouse

CD6 (Cluster of Differentiation 6) is a human protein encoded by the CD6 gene.

== Function ==
This gene encodes a protein found on the outer membrane of T-lymphocytes as well as some other immune cells. The encoded protein contains three scavenger receptor cysteine-rich (SRCR) domains and a binding site for an activated leukocyte cell adhesion molecule. The gene product is important for continuation of T cell activation.

== Clinical significance ==
Certain alleles of this gene may be associated with susceptibility to multiple sclerosis.

== See also ==
- Cluster of differentiation
