= Bhavish Aggarwal =

Indian businessman

- Born: 28 August 1985 (age 41); Ludhiana, Punjab, India
- Education: IIT Bombay (B.Tech)
- Occupation: Entrepreneur
- Title: Co-founder and CEO of Ola Consumer; Founder and CEO of Ola Electric; Founder of Ola Krutrim
- Spouse: Rajalakshmi Aggarwal
- Children: 2

Bhavish Aggarwal (born 28 August 1985) is an Indian entrepreneur. He is the co-founder and CEO of Ola Consumer, founder of Ola Electric and founder of Ola Krutrim, a large language model artificial intelligence (AI) company which became India's first AI unicorn in 2024 an estimated valuation of $1 billion.

Aggarwal was included in Time magazine's 100 Most Influential People of 2018. With a net worth of $2.3 billion, Aggarwal is one of the youngest self-made billionaires in the world.

== Early life ==
Aggarwal was born and brought up in Ludhiana, Punjab. He completed a bachelor's degree in computer engineering at Indian Institute of Technology Bombay in 2008. He started his career with Microsoft Research India as a research intern and later got reinstated as an assistant researcher.

== Career ==
He began his career with Microsoft, where he worked for two years, filed two patents and published three papers in international journals. In January 2011 he co-founded Ola Cabs with Ankit Bhati in Bengaluru.

=== Ola Consumer (formerly Ola Cabs) ===
The idea for a cab company struck Aggarwal when he had a bad experience with a taxi, which led him and Ankit Bhati to co-found Ola Cabs in 2010.

In May 2020, Ola Cabs announced a huge layoff of around 5000 employees in a move to survive the economic repercussions of COVID-19. It had suffered an overwhelming loss of revenue by about 95%. In a webinar addressed to the students of Bennet University, Bhavish said that the COVID-19 pandemic was about to accelerate the innovations in technologies. He claimed that the markets might move towards more car rentals and subscription-based ownerships of cars.

In April 2022, An internal email to Ola employees was sent out, announcing that Bhavish Aggarwal would be stepping down from day-to-day operations of the company to focus on the future of Ola’s venture into electric vehicles and quick-commerce.

In August 2024, Ola Cabs was rebranded to Ola Consumer to offer a broader range of consumer services.

== Controversies ==
=== Views on work culture ===
In 2022, Aggarwal was criticized for creating a toxic work environment, with reports of him tearing up presentations over missing page numbers, using Punjabi epithets, and making an employee run laps for a minor mistake. It was allegedly due to his 'aggressive' behaviour that company saw a string of high profile exits, such as Ola Cars CEO, Ola CFO, Ola Electric’s chief marketing officer, among others. He defended his 'hostile' behaviour as his personal style and reportedly said that, "passions and emotions run high and we are not on an easy journey." He reportedly also said that he is not building a 'me too' company.

Aggarwal made his support for N. R. Narayana Murthy public supporting his views for 70 hours work per week and made remarks against the concept of work–life balance. Some doctors noted that excessive working hours might cause pre-mature death among other problems due to overwork and such long hours only profit the CEOs. Aggarwal said that he instead believes that people who enjoy their work, will find happiness in work and life, and both will be in harmony. He also said that does not believe in the concept of working of 5 days a week and considers weekends a "western" concept.

In October 2025, an FIR was filed against Aggarwal and a few Ola Electric executives by the Bengaluru police with an employee's September 2025 suicide over workplace harassment and non-payment of dues as per his suicide note. However, the company claimed that the employee never reported any problems during his tenure and challenged the FIR in the Karnataka High Court. They also sought a motion to dismiss the FIR, calling the suicide note fabricated, but it was found to be authentic based on a forensic examination.

=== Views on the use of gender pronouns ===
Bhavish Aggarwal
(@bhash)
tweeted:

Hoping that this “pronoun illness” doesn’t reach India. Many “big city schools” in India are now teaching it to kids. Also see many CVs with pronouns these days. Need to know where to draw the line in following the west blindly!

5 May 2024

In May 2024, Aggarwal made remarks via his X account. He termed the use of preferred gender pronouns as a "western illness", which caused an online backlash from some on X with some users labelling him as homophobic, transphobic and conservative. LinkedIn removed his posts on "gender illness" citing community guidelines, following which Ola Consumer switched cloud services from Microsoft Azure.

== Awards ==
- ET Awards, Richest of the year, 2017
