= Kalpana Morparia =

Indian banker

CEO, South and Southeast Asia, JPMorgan
- In office 2008–2021
- Succeeded by: Leo Puri

Personal details
- Born: 30 May 1949 (age 77)
- Education: Sophia College for Women
- Occupation: CEO, JP Morgan

Kalpana Morparia is an Indian banker. She was associated with ICICI Bank for thirty three years. She was the chief executive officer of South and Southeast Asia, JPMorgan, the Indian extension of a 2.1 trillion dollar American company. Kalpana serves as an independent Director on the Boards of several leading Indian companies. A graduate in law from Bombay University, Morparia has served on several committees constituted by the Government of India. She is ranked by Fortune magazine as one of the fifty most powerful women in international business.

== Early life ==
Kalpana Morparia, youngest of her three sisters, was born on 30 May 1949 in a Lohana family of Bhawandas and Lakshmiben Tanna. At a young age, her father died. At 16 years old, she completed her schooling and joined Sophia College for Women to study Science and then she was a B.Sc. graduate with Chemistry by 1970. Later she pursued a Degree in Law.

== Career ==
She took up teaching after completing graduation but had to take a break for 11–12 months as she developed speech complications and had to remain confined to home. Her elder sister Parul Thakker had studied law and was associated with a solicitor's firm. She decided to follow the same and got admitted in a law college. Meanwhile, she married Jaisingh. She completed her law degree and joined in 1974 a law firm named Matubhai Jamiyatram and Madon, a law firm at no pay. In 1975, she joined ICICI to work at their legal department. The management began to entrust her with various responsibilities. In 1991 the management sent her to the US to study capital market in America where she worked at New York's David Polk and Wardwell for three months. She was responsible for the birth of ICICI Bank which she got listed with the New York Stock Exchange in 1999. She facilitated the merger of ICICI Bank with ICICI in 2002.

== Business advancement ==
Kalpana worked in the legal department of ICICI from 1975 to 1994. In 1996 she was designated as General Manager. Then she was in charge of the legal, planning, treasury and corporate communications departments. In 1998, she was designated a Senior General Manager of ICICI. She joined the Board of Directors of ICICI in May 2001. In May 2002 the board appointed Morparia as an executive director. Again in 2006 April she was designated as the Deputy Managing director. Thereafter she was made the joint managing director. She was then in charge of the Corporate Centre with responsibilities such as transaction processing and operations for wholesale, retail, rural and international banking, strategy, risk management, compliance, audit, legal, finance, treasury, secretarial, human resources management, corporate communications and facilities management and administration functions. For a period of five years from 1 June 2007 to 2012, she was the Chief Strategy and Communications Officer. She was the CEO of J P Morgan until 2021, she was also the independent Director of Dr. Reddy's Lab, Bennet & Colman, CMC Limited of Tata Consultancy. She looks after the philanthropic work of Bharati Foundation run by Sunil Mittal of Airtel. It is engaged with construction of schools in Punjab, Haryana, Uttar Pradesh, West Bengal and Tamil Nadu and adopts neglected schools.

== Achievements ==
- Kalpana has been instrumental in the ICICI Group's major corporate structuring initiative – the merger of ICICI Limited with ICICI Bank, to create India's second-largest bank.
- Morparia was named one of ‘The 50 Most Powerful Women in International Business’ by Fortune magazine in 2008.
