= Ola Consumer =

Indian ridesharing company

- Type: Private
- Industry: Transportation; Food Industry
- Founded: 3 December 2010; 15 years ago
- Founders: Bhavish Aggarwal; Ankit Bhati
- Headquarters: 414, 3rd Floor 4th Block, 17th Main, 100 Feet Road Koramangala Bangalore, Karnataka, India 560034
- Number of locations: 250+ cities
- Area served: India
- Key people: Bhavish Aggarwal (Co-founder & CEO); Ankit Bhati (Co-founder)
- Products: Mobile app, website
- Services: Vehicle for hire; Financial services; Food delivery
- Revenue: ▲₹2,799 crore (US$300 million) (FY23)
- Net income: ▼₹−772 crore (US$−82 million) (FY23)
- Number of employees: ~3,000 (2020)
- Parent: ANI Technologies
- Website: www.olacabs.com

Ola Consumer, formerly Ola Cabs, is an Indian transportation company that provides ride-hailing services and operates other business verticals such as financial services and cloud kitchens. It is headquartered in Bangalore and operates in 250+ Indian cities.

A variety of venture capitalists, including Softbank, have large stakes in the company. In January 2018, Ola extended into its first overseas market, Australia, and launched in New Zealand in September 2018. In March 2019, Ola began its operations in the UK. In April 2024, the company announced that it is exiting all of its international markets to focus on the Indian market. In August 2024, the company rebranded itself to Ola Consumer.

== History ==
In 2010, Bhavish Aggarwal established Olatrip.com, a trip planning company operating in the Delhi region. In January 2011, recognising a growing demand for on-demand cab services, Aggarwal and co-founder Ankit Bhati launched Ola Cabs, a taxi aggregation firm. It originally allowed users to make bookings via phone call before introducing its mobile app in June 2012. By early 2015, Ola reportedly had the biggest market share, followed by TaxiForSure, Meru Cabs, and Uber, which was launched in 2013.

In March 2015, Ola Cabs acquired rival TaxiForSure for ₹1,237 crore (US$200 million). In June 2015, Ola integrated TaxiForSure services on the Ola mobile application. In August 2015, Ola was reported to be operating in over 100 cities and became an app-only service. Later in the year in November, Ola acquired Geotagg, a trip-planning applications company, for an undisclosed sum.

In a move to expand beyond cab aggregation, Ola acquired the struggling foodtech company Foodpanda India with an eye on leveraging the growing food delivery segment business in December 2017. In April 2018, Ola acquired Ridlr (formerly Traffline), a public transport ticketing app. Later in August 2018, Ola financed Series A funding of the scooter rent startup Vogo, and again in December, invested another $100 million.

In 2019, more than 10,000 drivers applied in both online and offline modes, ahead of its launch in London. In February 2020, Ola launched its taxi-hailing services in London with over 25,000 drivers registered.

Ola posted its first-ever operating profit of ₹90 crore (US$9.6 million) in the financial year 2020–21.

In April 2024, Ola announced it was pulling out of all international markets—the UK, Australia, and New Zealand markets—with only a few days' notice.

In May 2024, Ola migrated from Microsoft Azure to its own cloud platform, Krutrim. In July 2024, Ola shifted from Google Maps to a new in-house mapping tool, Ola Maps.

On 18 August 2024, Ola Cabs was rebranded as Ola Consumer.

== Subsidiaries and services ==
Apart from the ride-hailing business Ola Cabs, the holding company ANI Technologies operates Ola Fleet, Ola Financial Services, and Ola Foods. As of September 2019, it also owns a 6% stake in the electric scooter manufacturing company Ola Electric.

=== Ride hailing ===
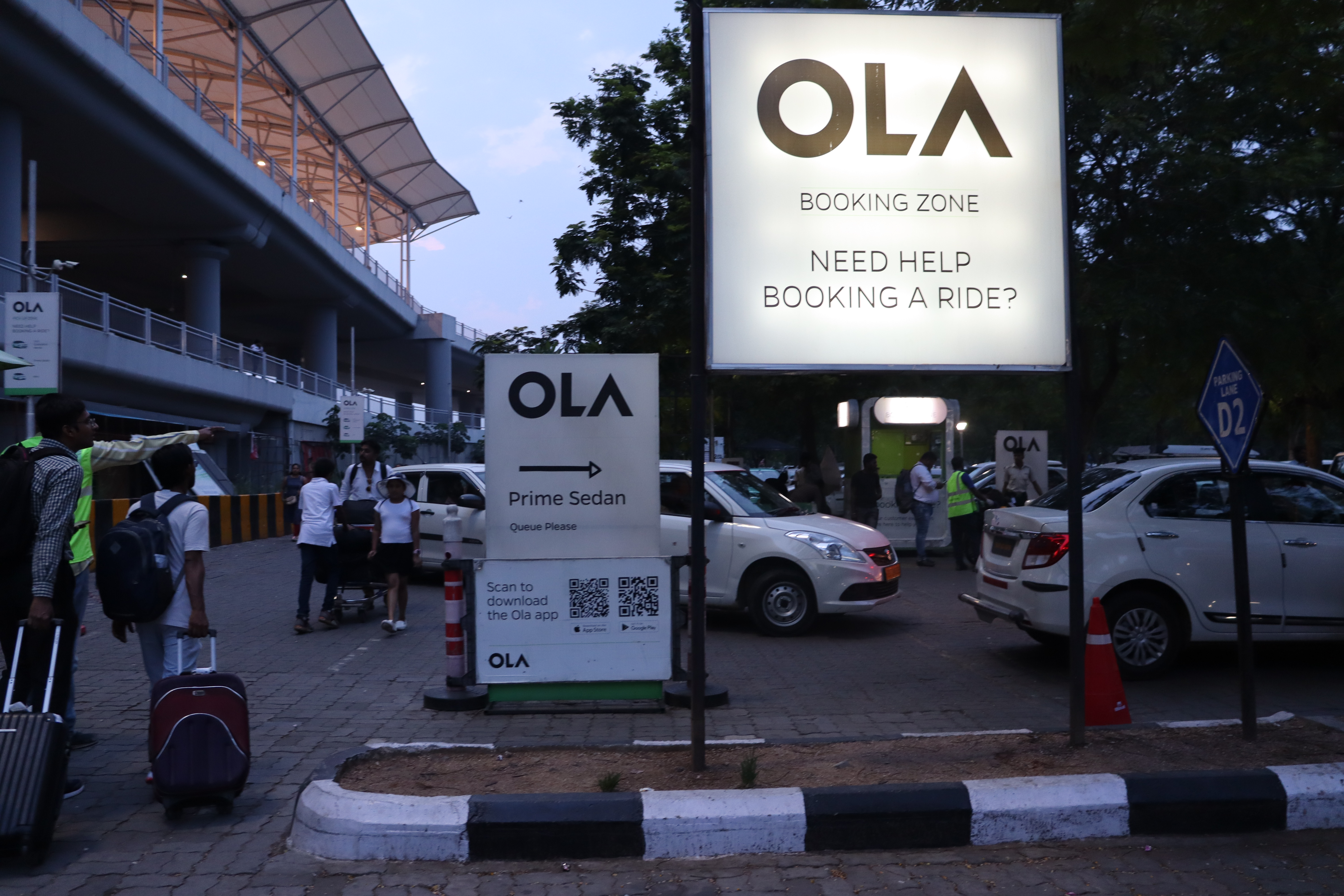
Ola has dedicated pickup zones outside major airports, railways stations and bus terminals.

Ola Cabs offers different levels of service, ranging from economic to luxury travel. The cabs are reserved through a mobile app and also through their website, and the service accepts both cash and online payments. It claims to clock an average of more than 150,000 bookings per day and commands 60% of the market share in India as of 2014. As of 2019, the company has expanded to a network of more than 1.5 million drivers across 250 cities.

In November 2014, Ola diversified to incorporate auto rickshaws on a trial basis in Bengaluru. After the trial phase, Ola Auto expanded to other cities like Delhi, Pune, and Chennai, starting in December 2014, and also in Hyderabad.

In March 2016, it introduced bike taxi service on its platform. Ola has faced legal troubles in many states where operating bike taxis is illegal.

=== Ola Fleet ===
In January 2015, Ola acquired radio taxi company GCabs for an undisclosed amount and renamed it Ola Fleet Technologies. Ola Fleet is engaged in leasing cabs to partnered drivers.

=== Ola Foods ===
Ola entered the food delivery segment in March 2015 under the name Ola Cafe but stopped the services in March 2016. It began offering food delivery services again in December 2017 with the acquisition of Foodpanda's Indian subsidiary for an undisclosed sum. Ola also announced that it would infuse up to $200 million in the food delivery unit. While the number of users and orders went up in 2018 due to discounts and offers, the numbers dropped sharply in early 2019. In June 2019, it stopped food delivery service and laid off most of its 1,500 delivery executives. However, it continued to operate Foodpanda's cloud kitchen business. As of 2021, Ola Foods operates more than 50 cloud kitchens, including its flagship brand called Khichdi Experiment, in six cities.

=== Ola Financial Services ===
In November 2015, Ola launched its mobile payments and wallet product called OlaMoney. OlaMoney is owned by Ola Financial Services, which also offers other financial products such as buy now pay later, insurance, co-branded credit cards, and vehicle loans in partnership with other financial institutions.

=== Ola Maps ===
In October 2021, Ola acquired GeoSpoc, a Pune-based geospatial technology company. Founder Bhavish Aggarwal wrote in a blogpost that the acquisition would help the company convert satellite imagery into web maps. In July 2024, Ola launched Ola Maps as an alternative to the Google Maps API, with Aggarwal urging Indian developers to use India-based solutions.

== Defunct services ==
=== Ola Dash ===
In July 2015, Ola launched Ola Store, a grocery delivery service in Bangalore, before shutting it down in March 2016. In November 2021, Ola Store returned with quick delivery of grocery and essentials, starting with a pilot launch in Bangalore. By January 2022, Ola had set up 200 dark stores across nine cities and rebranded the service as Ola Dash. In April 2022, Ola Dash scaled down its operations from nine cities to three cities and dismissed over 2,100 contract workers. In June 2022, it shut down Ola Dash in all cities.

=== Ola Cars ===
In October 2021, Ola launched its new and pre-owned car marketplace called Ola Cars in 30 cities, which was also expected to sell new vehicles of Ola Electric and other brands. By May 2022, the company had scaled down operations to 17 cities. In June 2022, it closed Ola Cars across all cities and stated that Ola Cars' "infrastructure, technology and capabilities will now be repurposed towards growing Ola Electric’s sales and service network." In August 2024 Ola Electric a subsidiary of Ola that manufactures electric powered two wheelers (scooter) went public through and IPO in India. Shares of the company surged 20% on opening day.

=== Ola Pedal ===
Ola launched a bike sharing service in December 2017.

== Criticism ==
=== Technology ===
Ola Cabs' technology came under criticism regarding the security of its mobile app. The API calls could be replayed to top up its wallet.

In August 2016, a privacy breach occurred when customers' details such as names, phone numbers, and addresses in Bangalore were received as SMS messages by an individual in Chennai. Although these unanticipated messages were reported to Ola, the company ignored them, even under the threat of being reported to the TRAI. The issue was reportedly fixed three weeks later after receiving considerable media coverage and social media attention.

On 19 January 2020, a technical glitch caused multiple users to receive notifications such as "Your ride is on the way" or "Your ride is here" despite them not even attempting to book through the platform. In some cases, cancelling the ride even attempted to automatically book another ride.

=== Billing and payment issues ===
The refund policy of Ola Cabs has been criticized because of charging errors caused by technical glitches in their system. Surge pricing has been an issue with customers, as Ola is said to initially eliminate competition by lowering prices and then hiking up prices through what it calls "surge pricing." The fact that the same ride can cost different amounts depending on the time, day, and the profiles, history, and rating of the driver as well as the passenger has also attracted criticism.

Charges comprise:

- Base fare (fixed amount)
- Distance fare (charged per kilometer)
- Ride time fare (charged per time taken to travel)
- Peak pricing (direct ratio depending on demand for cabs)
- GST (5%)
- Toll charges (toll collection if crossing a toll junction)

=== Driver concerns ===
In December 2016, drivers protested outside the Kukatpally, Hyderabad office of Ola, demanding more transparency over payments. From January 2017, Ola was criticized for continuously dropping the driver incentives, which in turn was affecting driver-partners' monthly income.

Ola and Uber have also been criticized due to their practice of baiting drivers and passengers, initially with discounts and bonuses, and then hiking up fares without passing the proceeds to drivers. Their practice of taking large signing-up amounts from drivers and not considering them employees has also been criticized. Both companies contractually treat drivers as "contractors," thus excusing themselves from any legal obligations.

==== Assaults on and Murders of Ola cab drivers ====
There have been 11 murders and over 90 kidnappings and robberies of drivers working for app-based cab aggregators, including Ola, by criminals posing as passengers using fake profiles. The most recent case happened in the city of Pune in June 2019 when a passenger killed the driver to steal his car. Two other murders of Ola drivers by robbers took place in New Delhi and Agra respectively.

=== Congestion externalities ===
A recent study has shown that Ola may be contributing significantly to congestion in three major Indian cities—Mumbai, Bangalore, and New Delhi. The adverse congestion effects were found to be the highest in the busiest areas of each city during peak hours. The study also reported that many who use these services would have otherwise used more efficient forms of public transport, such as the Delhi Metro.

=== Driver credibility ===
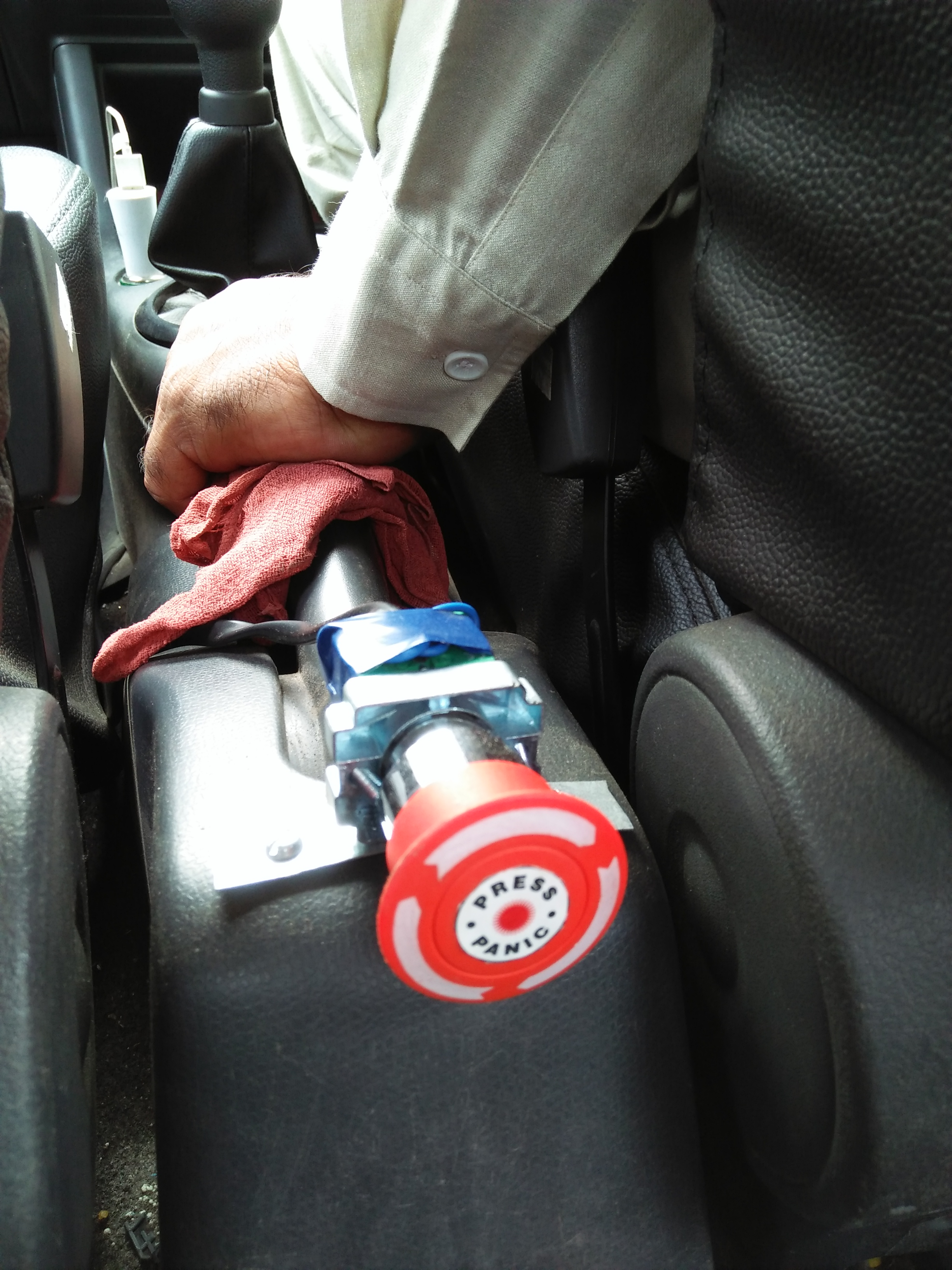
Panic button for passengers in an Ola car in Kolkata

The Delhi Transport Authority in early 2015 questioned the credibility and required verification of drivers working for Ola, along with other competitors such as Uber. The inquiry revealed that approximately 80% of drivers amongst all services did not possess permits to ply commercial transport services in Delhi.

=== License suspension ===
In March 2019, the Karnataka state transport department suspended Ola's operating license for six months for violation of license conditions and violation of Karnataka On-Demand Transportation Technology Aggregator Rules, 2016, on account of Ola running bike taxi services though it only had a license for four-wheeler taxi operations. The company stated that it was working with driving partners to continue functioning and was in touch with authorities to sort things out.

=== Sexist Ad Controversy ===
In 2016, Ola advertised an ad that created controversy for its sexist portrayal of women. It created protest from social media, following which the ad was removed.
