= Keki Mistry =

Indian banker and chief executive

- Born: November 7, 1954 (age 72); India
- Education: Sydenham College of Commerce and Economics (BCom)
- Occupations: Executive; Banker
- Title: Former CEO and Vice chairman of HDFC Ltd

Keki M. Mistry (born 7 November 1954) is an Indian business executive and banker who was the vice chairman and CEO of the Housing Development Finance Corporation (HDFC). He became Chairman of HDFC Bank in 2026.

== Early life ==
Mistry was born on 7 November 1954 in Mumbai to a Parsi family. Mistry completed his school education from Campion School, Mumbai and obtained a bachelor's degree in commerce from Sydenham college. Mistry is a Chartered Accountant from the Institute of Chartered Accountants of India.

== HDFC ==
Mistry joined HDFC in 1981 as an assistant manager of accounts. After serving different roles, he was appointed as vice chairman and CEO on 1 January 2010. He became interim chairman of HDFC Bank in 2026.

== Associations ==
Mistry is an advisor for Cyrus Poonawalla Group, working closely with Adar Poonawalla. He is an independent Operating Advisor at Kedaara. Mistry is also an executive director of HDFC, director of HDFC ERGO, director of HDFC Standard Life Insurance, non-executive & Independent director of HCL Technologies, director od BSE, member of the advisory board of Cox & Kings, interim Chairman at HDFC Bank, independent director at Tata Consultancy Services, director at Mahindra Holidays and Resorts India.

== Family ==
Mistry is married to Arnaaz, they have a daughter Tinaz, and live in Mumbai. Tinaz is married to real estate scion, Ashish Raheja, MD and CEO, Raheja Universal.
