= Renu Sud Karnad =

Indian businesswoman

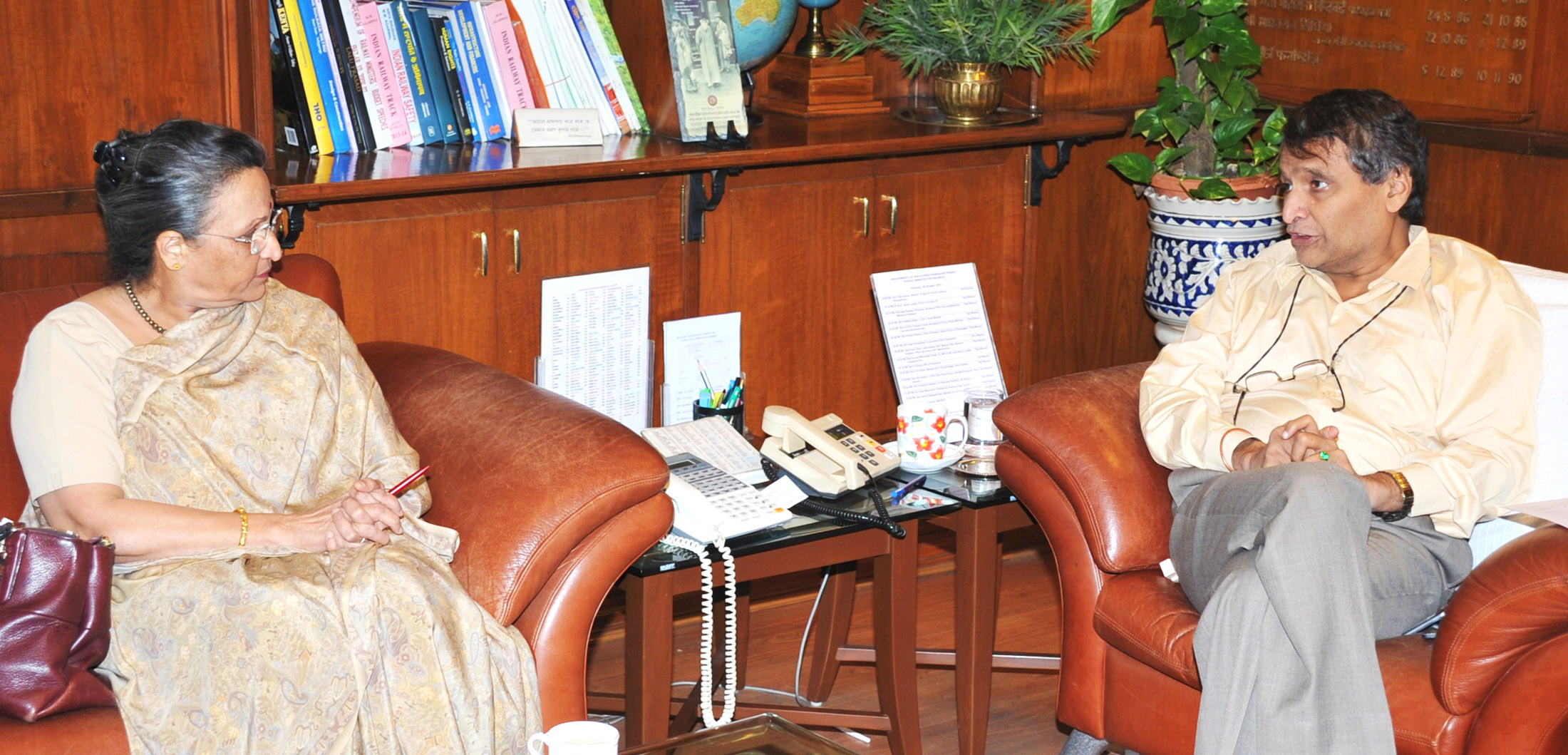
- Ms Renu Sud Karnad with erstwhile Railway minister Suresh Prabhu
- Born: India
- Citizenship: Indian
- Education: University of Mumbai, University of Delhi, Princeton University
- Organization: Housing Development Finance Corporation

Renu Sud Karnad is an Indian businesswoman and the managing director of India's largest Mortgage Financier Housing Development Finance Corp. Ltd. Additionally she also holds seven other positions for companies like HDFC Property Ventures Ltd., HDFC Education & Development Services Pvt Ltd. (both are subsidiaries of HDFC Ltd.) and Non-Executive Chairman at GlaxoSmithKline Pharmaceuticals Ltd. She is also the Vice Chairman-Governing Council at Indraprastha Cancer Society and Research Centre and part of the board of 17 other companies.

== Career ==
Karnad has been the MD of HDFC Ltd since 2010. After graduating with a law degree from the University of Mumbai and a degree in economics from the University of Delhi, she started her career with HDFC at the age of 26 in the year 1978. She took a short break later to study International Affairs at Princeton University in 1984. Karnad was the pursuant of the then new hub and spoke model for banking services introducing easy access by delivering loans at the point of contact. Her efforts in the early years led her to become the head of lending business at HDFC. In the year 2000, she was appointed as an executive director in the company. She was designated as the joint managing director in 2007 and promoted to the post of managing director in 2010. Since then she has been at the helm of affairs. In 2022 she was reappointed as director by the HDFC board. Karnad has been largely credited with the steady growth of HDFC bank over the span of 3 decades.

In 2013, she was listed as one of the Fortune India magazine's most powerful women in business in India for 8 years from 2011 to 2019. She was also listed as the Top 10 women to watch out for in Asia by the Wall Street Journal. Karnad was among the highest paid non promoter executive in the year 2019. In 2020, she was shortlisted by a panel seeking to find a successor to Aditya Puri. Karnad has been the jury for the SABERA awards that acknowledges SDG and ESG aligned initiatives in the field of CSR. Karnad has been credited with the herculean growth of the bank and its success in the current form. She has also been instrumental in getting the merger of HDFC bank with its parent company HDFC. Prior to the HDFC merger Karnad gave up her directorship positions with Maruti Suzuki and ABB India.

== Personal life ==
Karnad is married to strategic affairs analyst Bharat Karnad.

== Views on industry ==
Karnad is an optimist who sees housing as an asset that wouldn't depreciate. She is also of the opinion that investments in housing contribute to nation building in a way as 270 allied industries get employment from the housing sector. She also appreciates the maturity of the Indian consumers stating that despite several bank frauds, the consumers have reposed the faith in the banking system.
