= List of most valuable companies in India =

The total market capitalization of Indian companies was just above INR 500 lakh crores (~US$ 5.3 trillion) as of 31 October 2026. The list here is the list of most valuable companies in India by market capitalization, as listed by the Bombay Stock Exchange.

== 2026 ==
Top 10 companies in India in 2026 by market capitalization as on 06 November 2026:

Rank	Company name	Sector	Market capitalization (Rs Cr)
1	Reliance Industries Limited	Oil exploration and production	17,90,354.37
2	Jio Platforms Limited	Telecommunications	13,11,365.97
3	Bharti Airtel Limited	Telecommunications	13,00,284.35
4	HDFC Bank Limited	Banking and finance	12,10,209.72
5	ICICI Bank Limited	Banking and finance	11,24,574.02
6	State Bank of India	Banking and finance	9,38,492.08
7	Tata Consultancy Services Limited	Information technology	9,02,749.02
8	Bajaj Finance Limited	Finance	6,75,453.79
9	Larsen & Toubro Limited	Infrastructure	5,64,813.56
10	Life Insurance Corporation of India	Insurance	5,02,015.07

== 2021 ==
Top 10 companies in India in 2021] by market capitalization:

Rank	Company name	Market capitalization (Rs Cr)
1	Reliance Industries Limited	14,23,372.44
2	Tata Consultancy Services	12,81,372.44
3	HDFC Bank	8,44,408.61
4	Infosys	7,26,200.07
5	Hindustan Unilever	5,65,520.23
6	ICICI Bank	4,88,520.23
7	HDFC	4,88,220.23
8	State Bank of India	3,85,200.95
9	Bajaj Finance	3,71,425.80
10	Kotak Mahindra Bank	3,54,596.85
11	Bharti Airtel	3,50,592.40
12	Wipro	3,37,444.00
13	HCL Technologies	3,04,464.43
14	Asian Paints	2,87,444.99
15	ITC Limited	2,60,444.99

== 2018 ==
Top 10 companies in India in 2018 by market capitalization. Some companies are part of a conglomerate, which makes the parent company much more valuable than its listed entities.

Rank	Company name	Market capitalization (Rs Cr)
1	Reliance Industries Limited	6,04,372.44
2	HDFC Bank	5,16,408.61
3	HDFC	3,94,520.23
4	Infosys	3,25,200.07
5	Kotak Mahindra Bank	3,21,200.95
6	Maruti Suzuki	1,88,425.80
7	Bharti Airtel	1,58,596.85
8	Axis Bank	1,33,592.40
9	HCL Technologies	1,29,464.43

== See also ==
- List of largest companies in India
- List of public corporations by market capitalization
- List of largest companies by revenue
