= HDFC International Life and Re =

Indian Life reinsurance company

- Company type: Reinsurance
- Industry: Reinsurance
- Founded: 2016
- Headquarters: DIFC, Dubai, United Arab Emirates
- Key people: Yuvraj Narayan (Chairperson); Rahul Prasad (CEO); Board of Directors: Susir Kumar; Prasun Gajiri; Sameer Yogishwar
- Parent: HDFC Life
- Website: www.hdfclifere.com

HDFC International Life and Re Company Limited (HDFC International Life & Re) is a first life reinsurance company based in the Dubai International Financial Centre (DIFC), UAE.

It is a wholly owned international subsidiary of HDFC Life and was incorporated on 10 January 2016 under the previous Companies Law DIFC Law No. 2 of 2009, registration number 2067. HDFC international Life & Re had received its regulatory license from the Dubai Financial Services Authority ("DFSA") effective on January 31, 2016, and is regulated by Dubai Financial Services Authority (DFSA). The company established its overseas branch office at GIFT City, IFSCA in Gujarat India in 2023 to offer US denominated Life & Health and Travel insurance solutions to non resident and resident Indians.

== Geographical reach ==
The company with a registered paid up capital of US$29.5 million, is licensed and regulated by the DFSA to undertake life reinsurance business in the UAE and provide risk-transfer solutions, prudent underwriting solutions and value added services, among others, which includes individual life, group life and group credit life lines of business and currently offers reinsurance capacity in the Gulf Cooperation Council (“GCC”) region which includes life insurers/ cedents in the greater MENA ( Middle East and North Africa) region and India.

== Services ==
HDFC international Life & Re offers reinsurance on treaty and facultative basis As part of proportional reinsurance, it provides ‘quota share’ and/or ‘surplus’ for individual and group life policies as well as credit life policies. The reinsurance company also provides to its cedents customised insuretech platforms.

== Key people ==
Yuvraj Narayan is the chairperson of HDFC International Life & Re.

The CEO of the company is Rahul Prasad.

Board of Directors include Yuvraj Narayan, Susir Kumar, Prasun Joshi and Sameer Yogishwar.

== Associated companies ==
- HDFC Life
- HDFC Bank
- HDFC Securities
- HDFC Mutual Fund
- HDFC Pension
- HDFC ERGO General Insurance
- HDB Financial Services
- HDFC Realty
- HDFC Property Fund
- Credila
- HDFC Sales
