= Time Bank =

Time Bank may refer to:

- Time Banking, the practice of reciprocal service exchange which uses units of time as currency
- Time Bank Zimbabwe, a commercial bank in Zimbabwe
- Times Bank, a commercial bank in India, currently a subsidiary of the HDFC Bank
