= Kirtilal Manilal Mehta =

Indian businessman (1907–1993)

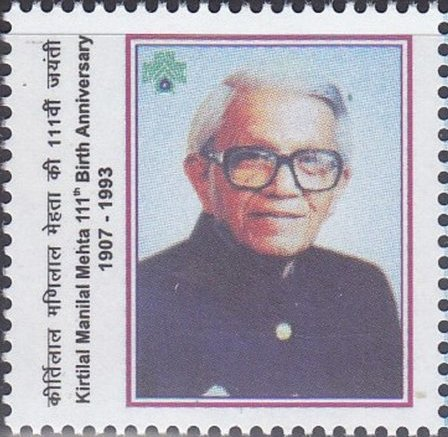
- Kirtilal M. Mehta on Indian postage stamp, 2018
- Born: February 7, 1907; Palanpur, India
- Died: July 21, 1993 (aged 86); Antwerp, Belgium
- Other names: Bapaji
- Organization(s): Beautiful Diamonds; Gembel Group; Lilavati Hospital and Research Centre
- Spouses: Lilavati Mehta; Esther Mehta
- Children: 7
- Awards: Order of Leopold from the King of Belgium

Kirtilal Manilal Mehta (7 February 1907 – 21 July 1993) was an Indian businessman.

== Career ==
Kirtilal Mehta was born in 1907 in Palanpuri Jain community and was a strict Jain vegetarian.

He started his career in 1918 in Rangoon, Burma (now Myanmar). He established diamond manufacturing and export houses, Gembel Group of Companies, which has offices worldwide.

Mehta established his own diamond company in the year 1944, which is known as Beautiful Diamonds, in Bombay (now Mumbai), British India. In 1953, he started his Gembel company in Antwerp, Belgium, followed in 1956 by a Gembel branch in Hong Kong, in 1968 by a Gembel center in Tel Aviv, Israel, and in 1973 by Occidental Gems in Manhattan, US.

=== Philanthropy ===
He founded Lilavati Hospital in Mumbai, which is named after his first wife, Lilavati Mehta, who died due to lack of medical facilities in Chandigarh while they were on a pilgrimage to Haridwar, India. He founded a new hospital and school in his birthplace, Palanpur. He had adopted 50 villages in Gujarat, providing essential amenities including education, water and health facilities.

== Death ==
At 86, Mehta died in a hospital in Antwerp, Belgium, on 21 July 1993.

His funeral was attended by Nicky Oppenheimer, Alec Barbour, Nigel Wisden, Arjun G. Sengupde, the Indian ambassador to Belgium and several De Beers colleagues and leading members of the diamond community and representatives of Belgium, Israeli and Indian governments.

== Awards and honours ==
Mehta received several awards for his outstanding contributions to the trade and economy of the countries where he established his business. He was honoured with the Order of Leopold, the highest order of Belgium given by Boudewijn of Belgium, the King of Belgium. He was awarded An Outstanding Exporter's Award was conferred by the Government of Israel, and the Nawab of Palanpur bestowed the title of Azazur-E-Riazat.

In September 2018, he was honoured posthumously for establishing Lilavati Hospital by Hirani Mata Sthanak Trust and the award was received by his son Prabodh Mehta.

On his 111th birth anniversary Kirtilal Mehta, the Government of India's Postal department released a commemorative postal stamp featuring him and his Lilavati Hospital in 2018.

== See also ==
- Lilavati Hospital and Research Centre
