= Sashidhar Jagdishan =

CEO of HDFC Bank

- Born: 1965 (age 60–61); Mumbai, India
- Education: (BSc) University of Mumbai (MSc) The University of Sheffield
- Occupation: Banker
- Known for: CEO of Indian HDFC Bank

Sashidhar Jagdishan (born 1965) is an Indian banker who is the current managing director and chief executive officer of HDFC Bank, one of India's largest private sector banks by market capitalization.

== Early life and education ==
Jagdishan was born in and raised in Mumbai, India. He completed his secondary education at Don Bosco High School and obtained a Bachelor's degree in Science with a specialization in Physics from the University of Mumbai. He also qualified as a chartered accountant. He went on to obtained a Master's degree in Economics of Money, Banking, and Finance from the University of Sheffield in the United Kingdom.

== Career ==
He joined HDFC Bank in 1996 as a manager in the finance department. Over the years, he took on increasing responsibilities, including being appointed Business Head - Finance and Chief Financial Officer (CFO) in 2008. In 2019, he assumed the role of 'Change Agent of the Bank,' overseeing various critical functions within HDFC Bank.

He was appointed as the CEO of HDFC Bank in October 2020, succeeding Aditya Puri. In 2023, he was recognized as the highest-paid bank chief executive in India.

== Recognition ==
Jagdishan was named the Bank CEO of the Year in Asia Pacific for 2024.

A notable achievement during his tenure was the merger of HDFC Limited into HDFC Bank in 2023, a move that boosted HDFC Bank's market capitalization to over INR 12 trillion (approximately $154 billion).

== Controversies ==
In 2025, Sashidhar Jagdishan faced allegations of financial fraud. The Lilavati Kirtilal Mehta Medical Trust, which owns and controls Lilavati Hospital in Mumbai, filed a First Information Report (FIR) against him and eight others, including former bank employees. The trust alleged that Jagdishan was involved in misappropriating funds, citing a seized cash diary that reportedly indicated his direct receipt of ₹2.05 crore out of a total of ₹14.42 crore misappropriated by the trustees.
