= List of largest companies in India =

This article lists the largest companies in India in terms of their revenue, according to the American business magazines Fortune and Forbes.

== 2025 Forbes list ==
This list is based on the Forbes Global 2000, which ranks the world's 2,000 largest publicly traded companies. The Forbes list takes into account a multitude of factors, including the revenue, net profit, total assets and market value of each company; each factor is given a weighted rank in terms of importance when considering the overall ranking. The table below also lists the headquarters location and industry sector of each company. The figures are in billions of US dollars and are for the year 2024. All 69 companies from India in the Forbes 2000 are listed.

Rank	Forbes 2000 rank	Name	Headquarters	Revenue (billions US$)	Profit (billions US$)	Assets (billions US$)	Value (billions US$)	Industry
1	49	Reliance Industries Limited	Mumbai	108.8	8.4	210.5	233.1	Conglomerate
2	55	State Bank of India	Mumbai	71.8	8.1	807.4	87.6	Banking
3	65	HDFC Bank	Mumbai	49.3	7.7	483.2	133.6	Banking
4	70	Life Insurance Corporation	New Delhi	98.0	4.9	561.4	73.6	Insurance
5	142	ICICI Bank	Mumbai	28.5	5.3	283.5	95.3	Banking
6	207	Oil and Natural Gas Corporation	New Delhi	77.5	5.1	80.6	41.9	Oil and gas
7	259	Indian Oil Corporation	New Delhi	93.8	5.0	57.8	27.8	Oil and gas
8	284	Tata Motors	Mumbai	52.9	3.8	44.4	43.8	Automotive
9	293	Axis Bank	Mumbai	16.7	3.2	182.0	42.3	Banking
10	372	NTPC Limited	New Delhi	21.2	2.4	54.7	42.5	Utilities
11	398	Larsen & Toubro	Mumbai	26.7	1.6	40.7	56.9	Capital goods
12	412	Tata Consultancy Services	Mumbai	29.1	5.5	17.6	166.5	Infotech
13	440	Bank of Baroda	Vadodara	17.1	2.3	198.4	16.2	Banking
14	442	Kotak Mahindra Bank	Mumbai	11.4	2.2	92.0	40.5	Banking
15	472	Bharti Airtel	New Delhi	18.1	0.9	53.3	91.5	Telecommunication
16	488	Coal India	Kolkata	17.2	3.9	28.5	34.8	Metals and mining
17	525	Canara Bank	Bangalore	16.8	1.8	184.0	12.4	Banking
18	533	Power Finance Corporation	New Delhi	11.1	2.4	124.6	18.5	Financials
19	537	Bharat Petroleum	Mumbai	54.1	3.2	24.3	16.4	Oil and gas
20	569	Infosys	Bangalore	18.6	3.2	16.5	71.9	Infotech
21	571	Punjab National Bank	New Delhi	14.8	1.1	191.7	16.5	Banking
22	575	Union Bank of India	Mumbai	14.3	1.7	168.1	12.7	Banking
23	592	Bajaj Finserv	Pune	13.0	1.0	64.5	30.3	Financials
24	593	Mahindra & Mahindra	Mumbai	16.8	1.4	28.3	37.5	Automotive
25	645	JSW Steel Ltd	Mumbai	21.1	1.1	27.4	26.6	Iron and steel
26	684	Hindalco Industries	Mumbai	26.1	1.1	27.1	17.7	Metals and mining
27	746	Grasim Industries	Mumbai	15.3	0.7	47.0	19.8	Diversified
28	764	HCL Technologies	Noida	13.3	1.9	12.0	43.4	Infotech
29	810	ITC Limited	Kolkata	8.5	2.5	10.5	65.4	Consumer goods
30	827	Power Grid Corporation of India	Gurgaon	5.6	1.9	29.6	35.0	Utilities
31	834	Tata Steel	Kolkata	28.3	−0.4	32.7	25.1	Iron and steel
32	901	IndusInd Bank	Mumbai	6.7	1.1	61.8	13.2	Banking
33	922	Indian Railway Finance Corporation	New Delhi	3.2	0.7	58.6	26.5	Financials
34	926	Wipro	Bangalore	10.8	1.3	13.8	28.9	Infotech
35	930	GAIL	New Delhi	16.1	1.2	15.0	16.1	Oil and gas
36	947	Indian Bank	Chennai	7.8	1.0	95.4	8.7	Banking
37	961	Vedanta Limited	Mumbai	17.4	0.5	22.9	19.7	Metals and mining
38	1048	Adani Power	Ahmedabad	6.1	2.5	11.1	29.4	Energy
39	1053	Bank of India	Mumbai	8.1	0.8	110.8	6.7	Banking
40	1059	Adani Enterprises	Ahmedabad	12.7	0.4	19.3	41.9	Holding
41	1161	Sun Pharmaceutical	Mumbai	5.7	1.1	9.6	44.1	Pharmaceuticals
42	1212	IndiGo	Gurgaon	7.9	0.9	8.8	20.2	Airline
43	1219	Adani Ports & SEZ	Ahmedabad	3.2	1.0	14.3	34.6	Shipping
44	1259	IDBI Bank	Mumbai	3.7	0.7	43.7	10.9	Banking
45	1264	Bajaj Auto	Pune	5.4	0.9	4.7	29.4	Automotive
46	1281	Shriram Transport Finance	Chennai	4.4	0.9	29.8	10.7	Financials
47	1384	Asian Paints	Mumbai	4.3	0.7	3.6	32.3	Chemicals
48	1534	Tata Power	Mumbai	7.4	0.5	16.7	16.7	Utilities
49	1562	Titan Company	Bangalore	6.2	0.0	2.3	1.1	Gems and jewellery
50	1604	Jio Financial Services	Mumbai	0.2	0.2	17.4	27.2	Financials
49	1568	Rajesh Exports	Bangalore	32.6	0.1	4.1	2.0	Gems and jewellery
50	1617	DMart	Mumbai	6.1	0.3	2.5	36.6	Retail
51	1693	Jindal Steel and Power	New Delhi	6.0	0.6	9.4	12.4	Iron and steel
52	1697	LIC Housing Finance	Mumbai	3.3	0.4	34.9	4.3	Financials
53	1699	Adani Green Energy	Ahmedabad	1.1	0.1	10.6	34.8	Renewable energy
54	1704	Bajaj Holdings & Investment	Mumbai	0.2	0.9	7.8	11.0	Holding
55	1760	General Insurance Corporation	Mumbai	5.7	0.9	20.9	7.2	Insurance
56	1769	Yes Bank	Mumbai	4.0	0.2	48.7	8.3	Banking
57	1805	Motherson Sumi Systems	Noida	11.4	0.2	9.4	10.5	Automotive
58	1821	Bharat Electronics	Bangalore	2.2	0.4	4.4	21.8	Aerospace and defense
59	1840	Central Bank of India	Mumbai	4.3	0.3	53.7	6.4	Banking
60	1842	Bank of Maharashtra	Pune	2.8	0.5	36.8	5.5	Banking
61	1848	Indus Towers	Gurgaon	3.5	0.7	6.7	11.1	Telecommunication
62	1853	Steel Authority of India	New Delhi	12.9	0.4	15.6	8.3	Iron and steel
63	1869	Federal Bank	Kochi	3.2	0.5	38.1	4.8	Banking
64	1873	DLF	Gurgaon	0.8	0.3	7.2	25.2	Real estate
65	1895	Dr. Reddy's Laboratories	Hyderabad	3.4	0.7	4.6	11.6	Pharmaceuticals
66	1908	Varun Beverages	Gurgaon	2.0	0.3	1.8	23.6	Beverages
67	1949	CIFCL	Chennai	2.3	0.4	18.8	13.0	Financials
68	1957	NMDC	Hyderabad	2.5	0.8	3.9	9.7	Mining
69	1980	ABB India	Bangalore	1.3	0.2	1.3	21.3	Capital goods

== 2025 Fortune list ==
The 50 largest companies by revenue in 2025 according to the Fortune India 500.

Rank	Name	Industry	Revenue (in ₹ crore)	Revenue growth	Profits (in ₹ crore)	Headquarters	State controlled
1	Reliance Industries Limited	Conglomerate	997,795	▲8%	69,648	Mumbai	
2	Life Insurance Corporation	Insurance	893,465	▲4%	48,320	Mumbai	Yes
3	Indian Oil Corporation	Oil and gas	766,008	▼2%	13,598	New Delhi	Yes
4	State Bank of India	Banking	663,343	▲12%	77,561	Mumbai	Yes
5	Oil and Natural Gas Corporation	Oil and gas	624,805	▲0%	36,226	New Delhi	Yes
6	HDFC Bank	Banking	470,916	▲15%	70,792	Mumbai	
7	Tata Motors	Automotive	449,357	▲2%	27,830	Mumbai	
8	Bharat Petroleum	Oil and gas	443,948	▼2%	13,337	Mumbai	Yes
9	ICICI Bank	Banking	294,587	▲25%	51,029	Mumbai	
10	Larsen & Toubro	Capital goods	260,745	▲16%	15,037	Mumbai	
11	Tata Consultancy Services	Infotech	259,286	▲6%	48,553	Mumbai	
12	Hindalco Industries	Metals and mining	243,534	▲13%	16,001	Mumbai	
13	Tata Steel	Iron and steel	220,507	▼3%	3,421	Mumbai	
14	NTPC Limited	Utilities	196,847	▲7%	23,422	New Delhi	Yes
15	Bharti Airtel	Telecommunications	194,387	▲26%	33,556	New Delhi	
16	JSW Steel Ltd	Iron and steel	168,689	▼6%	26,713	Mumbai	
17	Infosys	Infotech	166,590	▲6%	28,165	Bangalore	
18	Mahindra & Mahindra	Automotive	162,941	▲13%	12,929	Mumbai	
19	Vedanta Resources	Metals and mining	160,450	▲7%	14,988	London, UK	
20	Maruti Suzuki India	Automotive	159,407	▲8%	14,500	New Delhi	
21	Axis Bank	Banking	155,917	▲13%	28,055	Mumbai	Yes
22	Coal India	Metals and mining	155,605	▲1%	35,358	Kolkata	Yes
23	Bank of Baroda	Banking	152,884	▲8%	20,716	Vadodara	Yes
24	Canara Bank	Banking	152,658	▲10%	17,540	Bangalore	Yes
25	Grasim Industries	Diversified	151,048	▲14%	3,706	Mumbai	
26	GAIL	Oil and gas	147,417	▲8%	12,450	New Delhi	Yes
27	Punjab National Bank	Banking	141,570	▲15%	18,480	New Delhi	Yes
28	Bajaj Finserv	Financials	133,840	▲21%	8,872	Pune	
29	Nayara Energy	Oil and gas	130,326	▼3%	6,080	Mumbai	
30	Union Bank of India	Banking	129,979	▲10%	18,027	Mumbai	Yes
31	HCL Technologies	Infotech	119,488	▲7%	17,390	Noida	
32	Motherson Sumi Systems	Automotive	114,502	▲16%	3,803	Noida	
33	Power Finance Corporation	Financial services	107,203	▲17%	22,991	New Delhi	Yes
34	Kotak Mahindra Bank	Banking	107,095	▲14%	22,126	Mumbai	
35	Steel Authority of India	Iron and steel	103,861	▼6%	2,372	New Delhi	Yes
36	ITC Limited	Consumer goods	93,705	▲31%	34,747	Kolkata	
37	Wipro	Infotech	92,937	▲1%	13,135	Bangalore	
38	Flipkart	E-commerce	84,230	▲18%	−5,189	Bangalore	
39	IndiGo	Airline	84,098	▲18%	7,258	Gurgaon	
40	Bank of India	Banking	80,625	▲19%	9,548	Mumbai	Yes
41	Indian Bank	Banking	72,051	▲12%	11,261	Chennai	Yes
42	Hyundai Motor India	Automotive	70,282	▼2%	5,640	Gurgaon	
43	Tata Power	Utilities	68,892	▲6%	3,971	Mumbai	
44	Titan Company	Gems and jewellery	68,758	▲27%	3,337	Bangalore	
45	Toyota Kirloskar Motor	Automotive	65,958	▲16%	5,672	Bidadi	
46	Hindustan Unilever	Consumer goods	64,891	▲3%	10,649	Mumbai	
47	Adani Enterprises	Trading	62,652	▲12%	7,112	Ahmedabad	
48	AWL Agri Business	Consumer goods	61,387	▲24%	1,226	Ahmedabad	
49	Avenue Supermarts	Retail	60,599	▲17%	2,708	Mumbai	
50	NABARD	Finance	59,292	▲20%	7,803	Mumbai	Yes

== See also ==
- List of most valuable companies in India
- List of companies of India
- List of largest employers in India
- List of largest companies by revenue
- List of public sector undertakings in India
