= List of largest employers in India =

The largest employers in India include companies, the military, railway and the government. To keep the list manageable in length, only those companies/employers which have at least 100,000 employees are included in the list.

== Largest employers ==
Both private and public companies are included in this list, while conglomerate-level group entities are excluded.

Rank	Employer	Employees	Year	Industry	Country	References
1	Indian Armed Forces	1,400,000	2021	Defence	India	
2	Indian Railways	1,252,200	2024	Transportation	India	
3	Central Armed Police Forces	1,065,000	2021	Home affairs	India	
4	Quess Corp	617,000	2025	Services	India	
5	Tata Consultancy Services	593,314	2025	IT	India	
6	India Post	416,083	2021	Communications	India	
7	UP Police	332,414	2024	State police	India	
8	Infosys	317,240	2024	IT	India	
9	Accenture	300,000	2022	IT	Ireland	
10	Cognizant	254,000	2023	IT	United States	
11	Coal India out of numerical sequence	212,066	2026	Coal mining	India	
12	Reliance Retail	245,581	2023	Retail	India	
13	State Bank of India	232,296	2024	Banking	India	
14	Wipro	231,671	2021	IT	India	
15	HDFC Bank	213,527	2024	Banking	India	
16	HCLTech	208,877	2022	IT	India	
17	Capgemini	175,000	2024	IT	France	
18	IBM	130,000	2017	IT	United States	
19	ICICI Bank	126,660	2023	Banking	India	
20	Tech Mahindra	125,000	2021	IT	India	
21	Deloitte	120,000	2023	Professional services	United Kingdom	
22	Life Insurance Corporation of India	114,000	2021	Insurance	India	
23	West Bengal Police	111,032	2026	State police	India	
24	Axis Bank	104,333	2024	Banking	India	
25	Punjab National Bank	102,349	2024	Banking	India	

== See also ==
- List of Indian IT companies
- List of largest companies in India
- List of companies of India
- Lists of occupations
- List of largest United States–based employers globally
- List of wealthiest organizations
