= Deepak Parekh =

Indian businessman

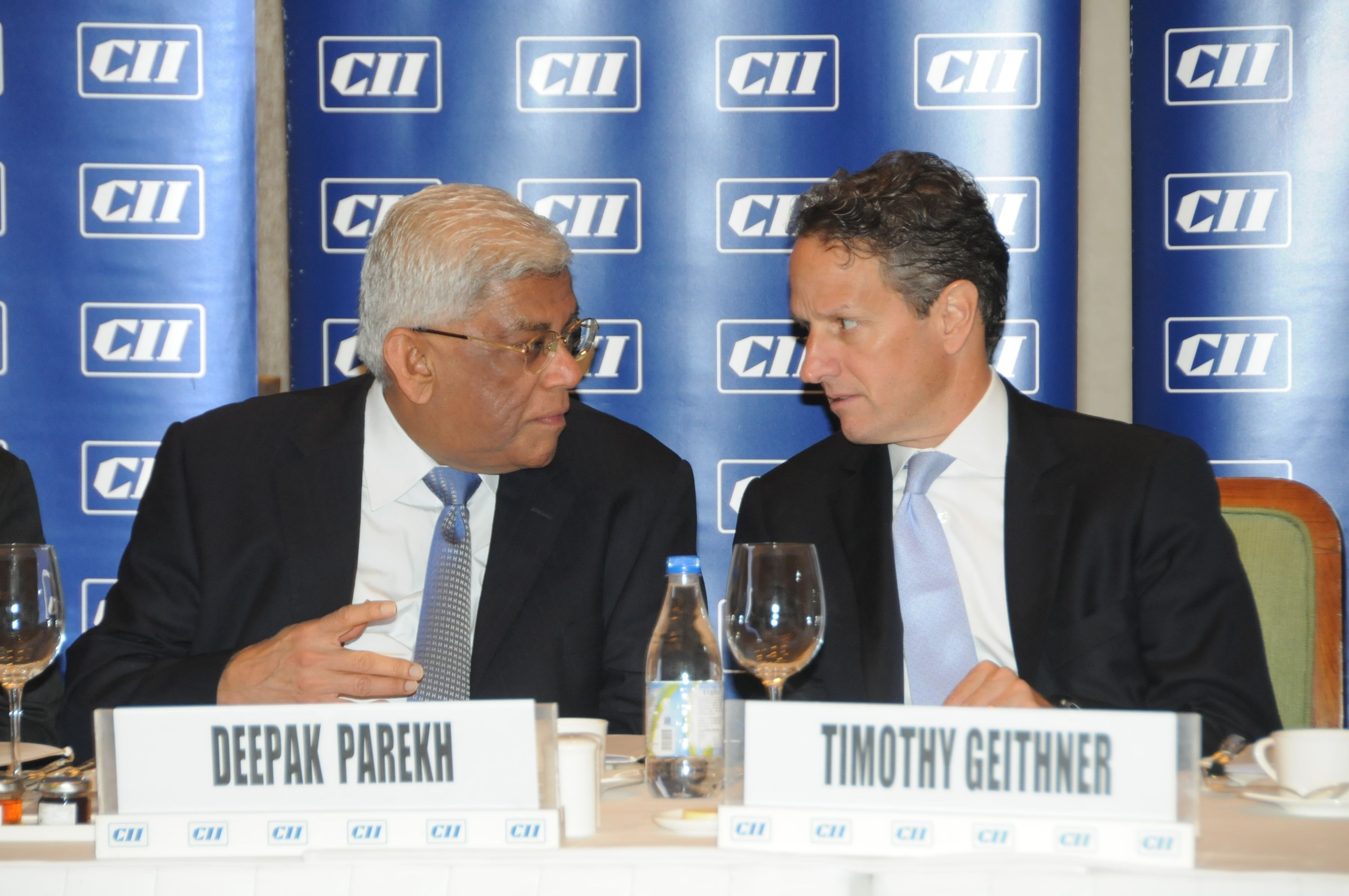
- Parekh (left) seated with Timothy Geithner at a CII meeting in October 2009.
- Born: 18 October 1944 (age 81)
- Education: Sydenham College of Commerce and Economics, Mumbai; Institute of Chartered Accountants in England and Wales
- Occupation: Former Non-Executive Chairman of the HDFC
- Relatives: Hasmukhbhai Parekh (uncle)
- Awards: Padma Bhushan

Deepak Parekh (born 18 October 1944) is an Indian businessman and the former chairman of Housing Development Finance Corporation, India's leading housing private development finance institution. It is based in Mumbai.

== Education ==
Parekh completed his schooling at St. Xavier's High School, Fort and later graduated with a B.Com from Sydenham College affiliated with the University of Mumbai. He went to England in 1965 to qualify as a chartered accountant with the ICAEW; he completed his articleship with Whinney, Smith and Whinney (which later became Ernst & Young) in London.

He also cleared the Certified Associate of Indian Institute of Bankers (CAIIB) of Indian Institute of Banking and Finance. He cleared his ACA exams in the first attempt and was afterwards posted at the firm's consulting arm Ernst & Ernst in New York.

== Career ==
Parekh has worked at Ernst & Young, Grindlays Bank, and Chase Manhattan Bank as its assistant representative for South Asia. He joined Housing Development Finance Corporation (HDFC) in 1978. HDFC was founded by his uncle, Hasmukhbhai Parekh. Parekh also became the Non-Executive Chairman of Infrastructure Development Finance Company Ltd (IDFC), a specialised financial institution for financing infrastructure projects in 1997. He is also the Non-Executive Chairman of Glaxo India Ltd & Burroughs Wellcome (India) Ltd and on the Board of Castrol India Limited, Fairfax India Holdings Corporation, and Siemens Ltd, Mahindra & Mahindra, Indian Hotels Company and SingTel. Parekh is an advisory board member of AIESEC India and US Engineering consultancy giant, AECOM and Tribeca Developers.

Parekh has been a member of various Committees set up by the Government of India. He was appointed Chairman of the high level expert committee formed to recommend measures for strengthening the Unit Scheme in 1964. The Reserve Bank of India appointed him Chairman of the Advisory Group for Securities Market Regulation, which was tasked to compare the level of adherence to international standards in India with that in other countries. He was also Chairman of the Expert Committee constituted by the Ministry of Power to look into the reform efforts in the power sector.

== Awards and honors ==
Deepak Parekh has won several awards including Businessman of the Year 1996 from Business India and the JRD Tata Corporate Leadership Award by All India Management Association (AIMA). He was the first recipient of the Qimpro Platinum Award for Quality for his contributions to the services sector, and the youngest recipient of the Corporate Award for Life Time Achievement by the Economic Times. Padma Bhushan was conferred on him by the Government of India. In 2010 he was the first international recipient of The Institute of Chartered Accountants in England and Wales' Outstanding Achievement Award, for his contribution over many years to the finance and accountancy profession. He was appointed as the advisor to Sunil Gavaskar who was interim chairman of IPL-7. Parekh is also on the Advisory board of IIMUN.
