= Don Bosco High School, Matunga =

Location
- Nathalal Parekh Marg, Matunga; Mumbai, Maharashtra, 400019; India; 19.026024°N 72.858109°E

Information
- Type: English medium school
- Motto: Virtute Robur
- Religious affiliation: Catholic
- Founded: 31 January 1942; 84 years ago
- Founder: Fr. Aurelius Maschio
- Administrator: Fr. Orville Coutinho
- Rector: Fr. Godfrey D'Souza
- Principal: Fr. Flovi D'souza
- Grades: Pre-Primary to Grade 12 and International Baccalaureate
- Gender: All boys
- Website: www.donboscomatunga.com

Don Bosco High School is a Roman Catholic all-boys school in Matunga, Mumbai, India. It has a subsidiary which was built in 1970 in Borivali.

== History ==
In 1937, the general council of Salesians of Don Bosco approved a plan to buy 60,000 square yards (50,000 m^{2}) land in Matunga from the Bombay Municipal Corporation. The Corporation approved the sale on 16 July 1937. The Don Bosco High School (formerly known as The Catholic Educational Institute) run by them was moved from the rented premises at Tardeo to the new Don Bosco campus at Matunga.

Fr. Aurelius Maschio was the main pillar behind the creation of the school. The land brought from the Bombay Municipal Corporation was marshland which was filled with debris to be able to build the school which started off at a partially completed building on 31 October 1941 and later officially inaugurated on the 31 January 1942. This building still serves as the Main/Secondary section of the school.

The foundation stone of the primary section building was blessed and laid on the feast of Don Bosco 31 January 1950. The building was completed in time for the new school year of June 1951. The architect were the famous and well renowned Patki and Dadarkar. All stained glass were imported from Italy. Pope Pius XII had inaugurated the school.

The Shrine of Don Bosco's Madonna, which is located in the school campus at Matunga, was opened on 5 August 1957. The church is credited as being one of the architectural high points of the suburb.

== Facilities ==
The syllabus is in accordance with the Maharashtra Board of Secondary and Higher Secondary Education. The school offers kindergarten (junior and senior) to Standard 10. The subjects offered include English, Marathi, Hindi Entire, Hindi composite/French Composite (French language is offered by the school from 8th standard onwards) Mathematics (Algebra and Geometry), General Science (Science I, Science II) History, Civics, Geography and Economics.

The school houses The NIOS and Pre-NIOS School for less-abled students.

Facilities include football grounds, hockey grounds, basketball courts, Rev. Fr. Aurelius Maschio computer institute, Don Bosco Recreation Centre, Health Club with fitness facilities, tennis courts, cricket grounds, and an astroturf ground.

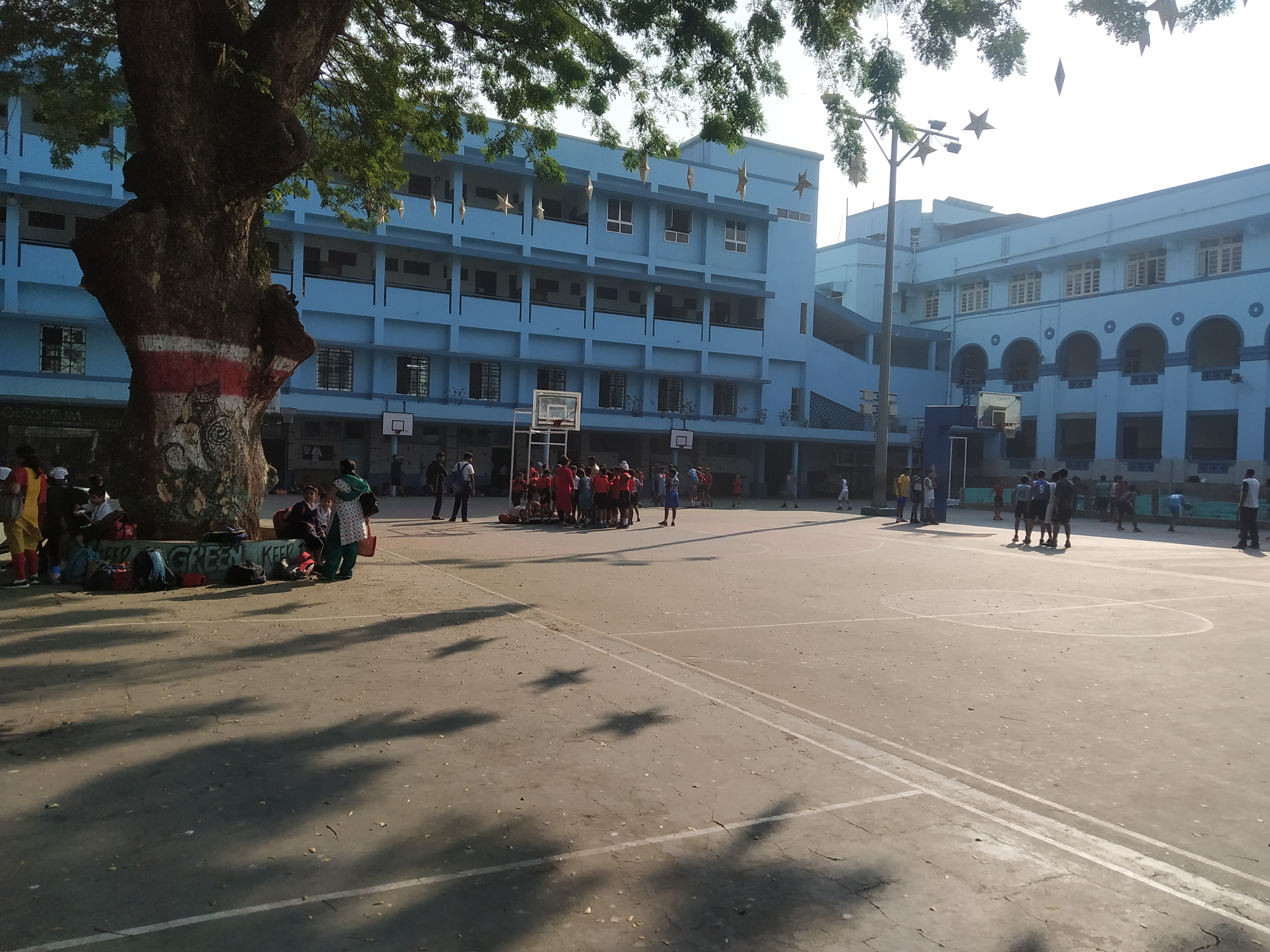
School Building of Don Bosco in Matunga, Mumbai

The school band of Don Bosco High School, Matunga is one of the top 10 bands in India. There is an opportunity of learning different instruments like saxophone, trumpet, and drums.

== Annual events ==
The school organizes a Sports Fest where students participate in games and athletic events. It is a two-day-long festival.

The annual Care n Share' Christmas Panorama is organized with a theme. Causes like Gujarat Earth Quake were taken up and the school contributed to these causes. The Panorama is organized along with a funfair where games are organized by the students. Tokens for these games come at a meagre cost and the amount collected is added to the bounty of the cause along with the sponsorships generated by the students.

The Annual Thanksgiving Day is another opportunity for the students to show-case their talents. The school organizes a show every year, most often a Westend-Broadway musical. The shows are staged over two or three days with the final day being the official Annual Day where deserving students and members of the staff are felicitated.

== Administration ==
- Principal: Mrs. Anita Philip
- Rector: Fr. Godfrey D’Souza

== Emblem ==
The school has the motto In Virtute Robur - which is in the Latin language. Virtute is a noun associated with meanings like - virtue, strength, bravery, manliness, character, excellence. Robur is a Latin word meaning oak, figuratively perhaps indicating strength. The motto can be probably roughly translated as "In virtue lies strength." This meaning can be also inferred by comparing a similar motto from the New Zealand defence force. The school colours are blue and white.

== Notable alumni ==
- Mahesh Bhatt, Film director, producer & screenwriter
- Aditya Mehta, World Snooker Champion
- Mir Ranjan Negi, Former Indian Hockey Captain
- Royston D'Souza, professional footballer
- Farokh Engineer, cricketer
- Piyush Goyal, Politician and cabinet minister of Government of India.
- Trilok Gurtu, Percussionist, music composer, jazz musician
- Hariharan, Indian playback singer
- Shreyas Iyer, Cricketer
- Shashi Kapoor, Bollywood actor
- Shammi Kapoor, Bollywood actor
- Akshay Kumar, Bollywood actor
- Anant Mahadevan, Bollywood, Tamil cinema, TV actor, screenwriter, director
- Mahesh Manjrekar, Actor, Director, and Playwright for Bollywood and Marathi films
- Shams Mulani, Cricketer
- Sajid Nadiadwala, Bollywood producer and director
- Sharad Panday, Cardiac Surgeon
- Jatin Paranjpe, cricketer
- Ravi Shastri, Cricket player, captain and former coach for the India national cricket team.
- Vishal Kotian, Television and bollywood actor
- Sashidhar Jagdishan, CEO of HDFC Bank

== See also ==
- List of schools in Mumbai
