= Prabodh Mehta =

Indian businessman (1936–2020)

- Born: August 21, 1936; India
- Died: November 3, 2020 (aged 84); Antwerp, Belgium
- Occupations: Trustee Of Lilavati Hospital and Research Centre; Vice Chairman of Gembel European NV; Founder of Kay Diamond
- Spouse: Usha Prabodh Mehta (m. 1963)
- Children: 2
- Awards: Order of Leopold II from the King of Belgium in (1993)

Prabodh Kirtilal Mehta (21 August 1936 – 3 November 2020) was an Indian diamond merchant. He is the son of the Late Shri Kirtilal Mehta and the founder of Lilavati Hospital and Research Centre.

He was the trustee of Lilavati Hospital and a chairman of the Gembel Diamond NV, Kay Diamond and Joint Managing Director of Pace Gems in Dubai.

== Early life ==
At age 17 Prabodh Mehta joined Gembel European NV to assist his father Kirtilal Mehta in the diamond business. He was known for his diamond creations.

Along with his school education, he gained knowledge of the diamond industry that helped build his career in the field of diamond sales.

== Career ==
In 1953, Mehta left for Antwerp, Belgium to launch his company of Gembel European NV. After this, he visited Mumbai to set up diamond manufacturing units. He was CEO of Pace Gems, Member Of Board Of Directors Gembel European Sales and Adesh International and COO for Adesh Gems.

== Recognition ==
Mehta received several awards for his diamond achievements and excellence in business globally and social work as a trustee of Lilavati Hospital including the Order of Leopold II from the King of Belgium in 1993 and the Order of the Crown (Belgium) from the King of Belgium in 2004.

== Gallery ==
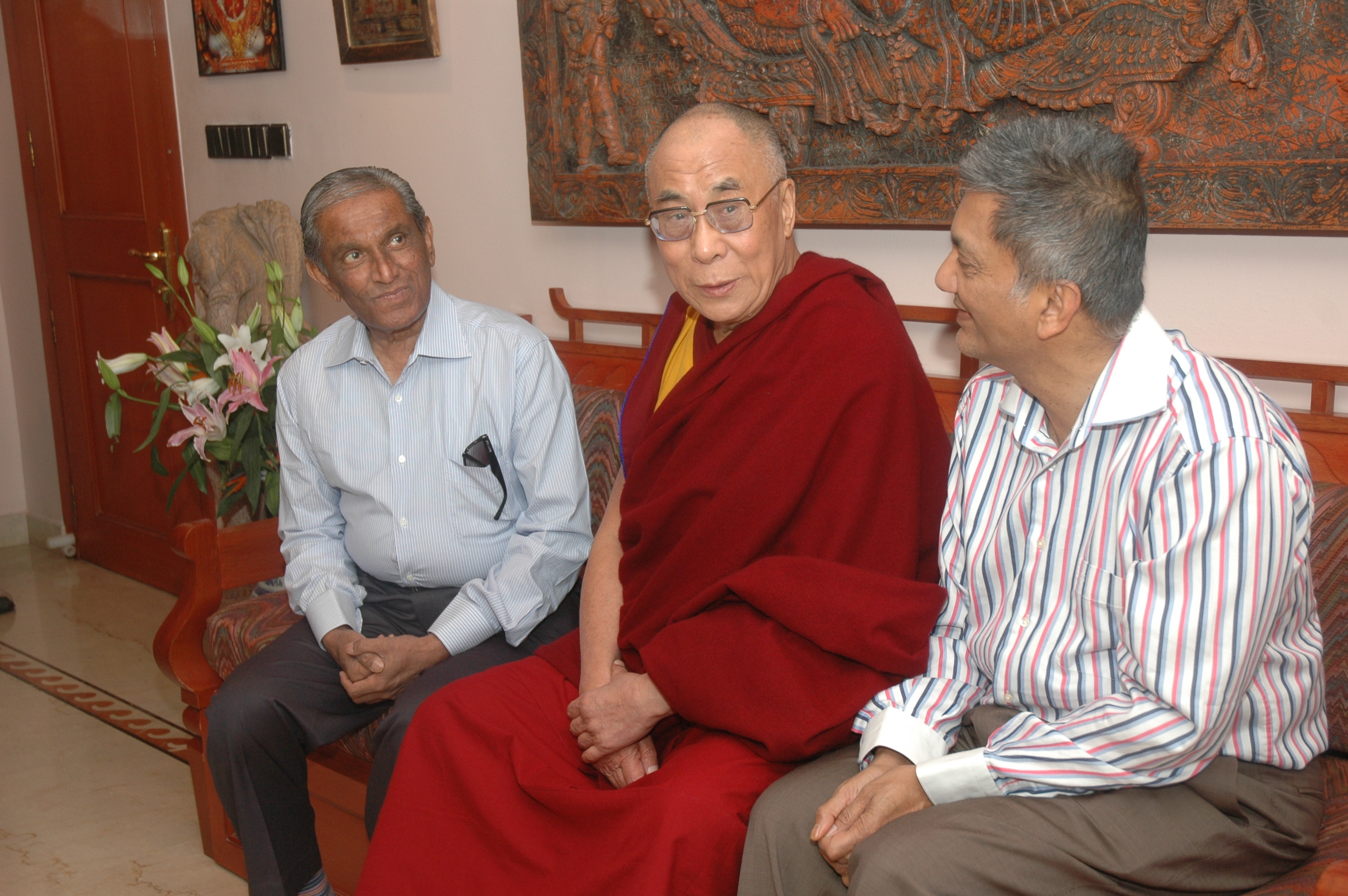
Prabodh Kirtilal Mehta and Rashmi Kirtilal Mehta with the Dalai Lama

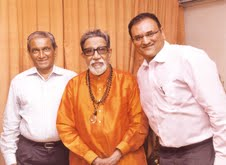
Prabodh Mehta & Chetan Prabodh Mehta

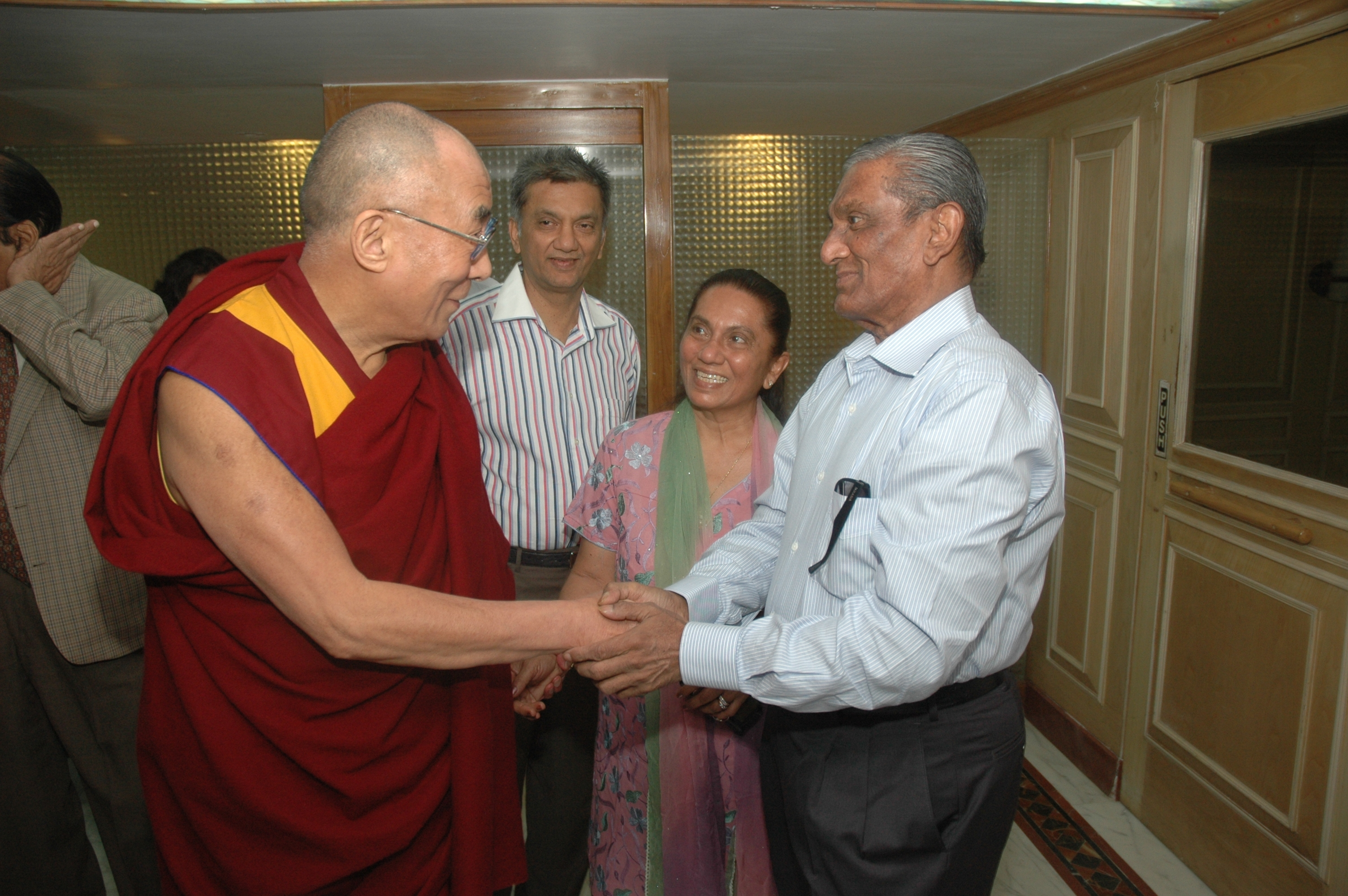
Prabodh Kirtilal Mehta, Rashmi Kirtilal Mehta and Rekha Sheth with the Dalai Lama

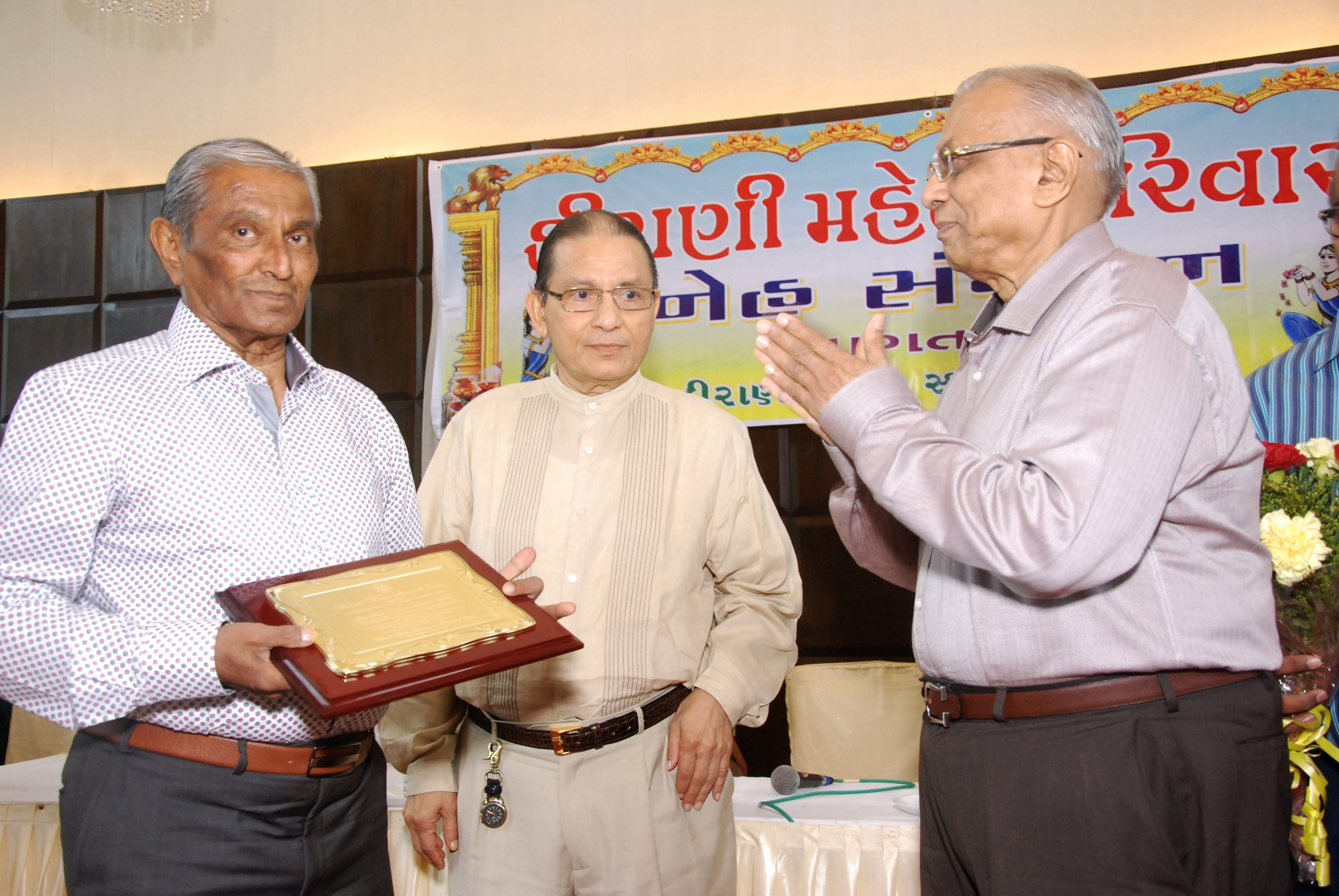
Prabodh Kirtilal Mehta receiving award by Hirani Mata Sthanak Trust on September 22, 2013

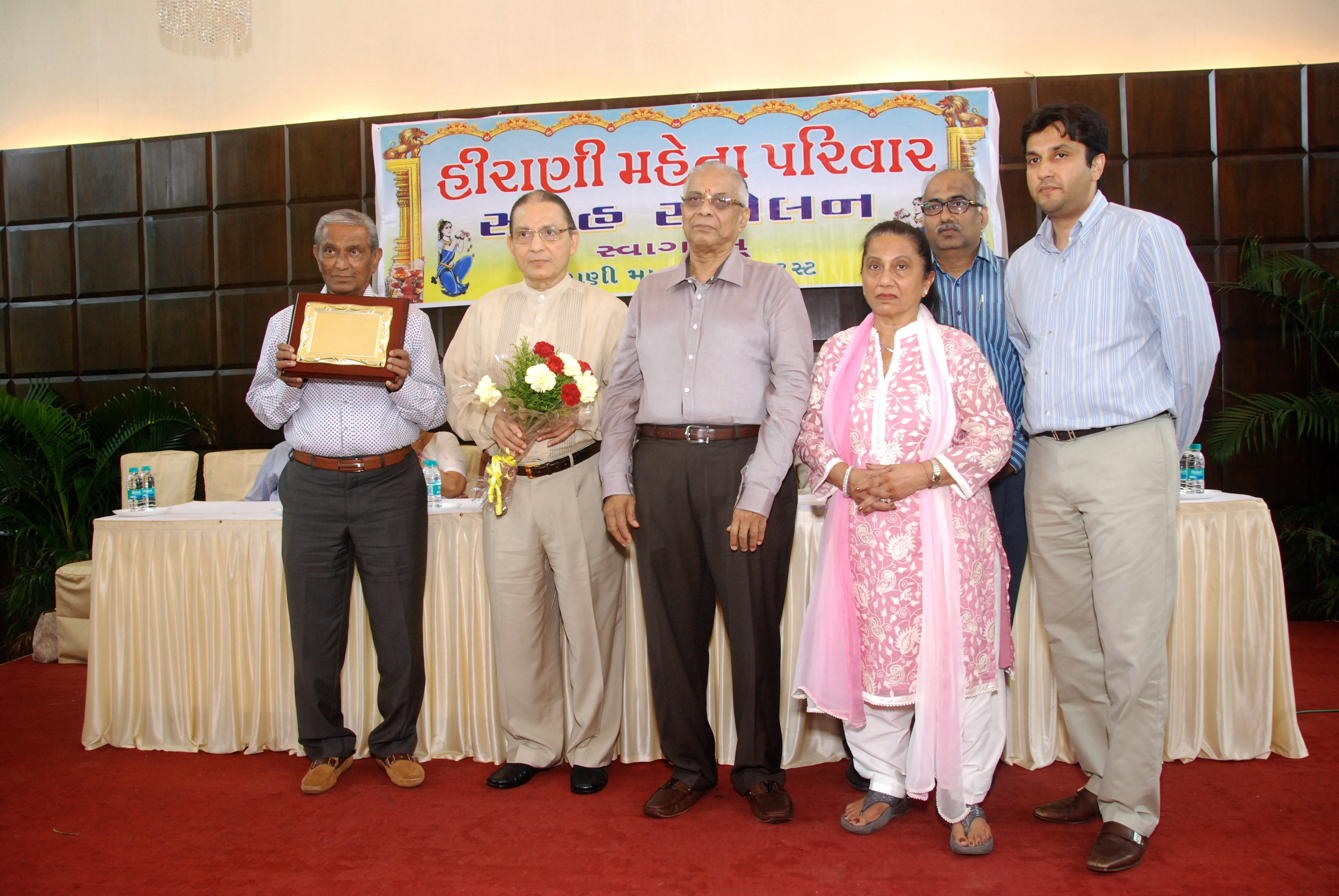
Prabodh Kirtilal Mehta receiving award by Hirani Mata Sthanak Trust on September 22, 2013

== Family ==
Mehta married Usha in 1963. They raised two children: Chetan Mehta (48) and works with Gembel European Sales, Adesh International and Adesh Gems. His daughter Neena Parikh, 44, is married and lives in Dubai.

Mehta died on 3 November 2020, at the age of 84.
