= Hasmukhbhai Parekh =

Indian financial entrepreneur

Hasmukh Thakordas Parekh
- Born: 10 March 1911; Surat, British India
- Died: 18 November 1994 (aged 83); India
- Known for: Founding HDFC and GRUH Finance Ltd.

Hasmukh Thakordas Parekh (10 March 1911 – 18 November 1994) was an Indian financial entrepreneur, writer and philanthropist. He played a role in the development of Industrial Credit & Investment Corporation of India, now ICICI Bank, founded the Housing Development Finance Corporation, and in 1992 was awarded the Padma Bhushan for his contribution to the finance industry in India. The London School of Economics also conferred on him an honorary fellowship.

== Biography ==
Hasmukh Thakordas Parekh was born to a Jain family in Surat, Gujarat. During his early life he lived in a chawl with his father, Thakurdas, and had to juggle a part-time job and studies with the London School of Economics. He subsequently worked as a lecturer at St. Xavier's College, Mumbai, for three years, and later began his financial career with the stock broking firm Harkisandass Lukhmidass. He joined ICICI as Deputy general manager in 1956, became chairman and managing director in 1972. He retired in 1976 and was Chairman of ICICI's Board until 1978.

At 66, when he had already received many honours and was stepping down from ICICI, he started a new institution, the Housing Development Finance Corporation (HDFC), the first of its kind for housing finance in India. On meeting the then Secretary of Finance, Dr Manmohan Singh, the latter told him that HDFC was an unknown venture and that no one knew if it would "click" with the Indian people, but Hasmukh Thakordas Parekh had by then already obtained promises of funding from overseas investors, and he was enthusiastic about the project. H.T. Parekh Library (IFMR) is an archive and reference library. It is used by Institute's faculty members, researchers, staff, students as well as outsiders for their academic and research requirements.
