= Times Bank =

Indian bank

- Company type: Public sector
- Industry: Banking, Insurance, Capital Markets and allied industries
- Founded: 1994
- Founder: Bennett, Coleman & Co. Ltd.
- Defunct: 31 March 2000
- Fate: Acquired by HDFC Bank
- Successor: HDFC Bank
- Headquarters: Mumbai, India
- Number of locations: India
- Area served: India
- Products: Deposits, Personal Banking Schemes, C & I Banking Schemes, Agri Banking Schemes, SME Banking Schemes
- Services: Loans, Deposits
- Owner: HDFC Bank
- Number of employees: 541
- Parent: HDFC Bank
- Divisions: 35 ATMs and 34 branches

The Times Bank was a bank founded in 1994 by the Bennett, Coleman & Co. Ltd. which is the holding company of The Times of India newspaper.

== History ==
In December 1993, The Times Group (which is owner of the Times of India newspaper) received an in-principle approval from the Reserve Bank of India for starting a new private bank.

The Bank was incorporated on 6 July 1994 by the Bennett, Coleman & Co. Ltd. and the Certificate of Commencement of Business was obtained on 22 August 1994.

The Bank opened its first branch on D. N. Road, Mumbai, on 8 June 1995.

In the year 2000, the bank was merged with the Indian private bank HDFC Bank.

== Business activities ==
The bank was a member of the Cirrus ATM network. It had four strategic business units: assets group, trade finance group, services group & syndication & advisory services group. It was also the first bank in India to provide an on-line, real-time debit programme in Delhi & Mumbai.

At the time of its acquisition, Times Bank had 541 employees, 35 branches and 34 ATMs, whereas HDFC Bank had 827 employees, 57 branches and 77 ATMs. Moreover, many of the employees at the Times Bank were former employees of the State Bank of India.

The acquisition of Times Bank by HDFC Bank was a major profit booster for The Times Group.

== See also ==
- Indian banking
- List of banks in India
