= HDFC Life =

Indian life insurance company

HDFC Life Insurance Company Limited
- Trade name: HDFC Life
- Type: Public
- Traded as: BSE: 540777; NSE: HDFCLIFE; NSE NIFTY 50 constituent
- ISIN: INE795G01014
- Industry: Financial services
- Founded: 2000; 26 years ago
- Founder: HDFC Ltd
- Headquarters: Mumbai, India
- Area served: India
- Key people: Vibha Padalkar (MD & CEO); Niraj Shah (ED & CFO)
- Products: Life insurance; Term life insurance; Unit-linked insurance plan; Endowment policy; Money-back policy; Whole life insurance; Retirement plans
- Revenue: ▲₹77,759 crore (US$8.3 billion) (2026)
- Operating income: ▲₹2,285 crore (US$240 million) (2026)
- Net income: ▲₹1,912 crore (US$200 million) (2026)
- Total assets: ▲₹390,502 crore (US$42 billion) (2026)
- Total equity: ▲₹17,407 crore (US$1.9 billion) (2026)
- Number of employees: 38,291 (2026)
- Parent: HDFC Bank (50.39%)
- Website: www.hdfclife.com

HDFC Life Insurance Company Limited, doing business as HDFC Life, is an Indian life insurance company, headquartered in Mumbai. The company offers individual and group insurance services and was incorporated in 2000.

HDFC Life is a subsidiary of HDFC Bank Limited, which holds a majority stake following the amalgamation of the parent Housing Development Finance Corporation (HDFC Ltd.) into the bank.

== History ==
The Insurance Regulatory and Development Authority (IRDA) was constituted in 1999 as an autonomous body to regulate and develop the insurance industry. The IRDA opened up the market in August 2000 with the invitation for application for registrations. HDFC Life obtained the certificate of commencement of business on 12 October 2000 and a certificate of registration from Insurance Regulatory and Development Authority of India (IRDAI) to undertake the life insurance business on 23 October 2000, becoming the first private sector life insurance company in India. The company was a joint venture between Indian housing finance institution HDFC and UK-based investment company Standard Life (now Abrdn).

In 2016, Standard Life increased its stake in HDFC Life from 26% to 35%. In the same year, HDFC Life established its first international subsidiary in the UAE called HDFC International Life and Re.

By 2017, it was the country's third-largest private sector life insurance company with a 16.5 percent share of total private-sector premiums for the Financial Year 2017 and fourth largest in the life insurance industry based on premium earned. It was the second largest private pension fund management company in India in terms of assets under management and subscribers in 2017.

In November 2024, HDFC Life launched a forensic investigation after an unauthorized entity accessed select customer data. The insurer notified regulators, filed a police complaint, and confirmed by March 2025 that the incident was resolved without material operational impact.

In July 2026, HDFC life announced a recovery in policy sales generated through its primary bancassurance partner, parent company HDFC Bank. The company's share of sales within the bank's branch network had previously declined due to heightened competition from rival insurers offering lower premium rates, following regulatory changes that allowed banks to distribute policies from multiple providers.
