= Aditya Puri =

Ex-managing director of HDFC Bank

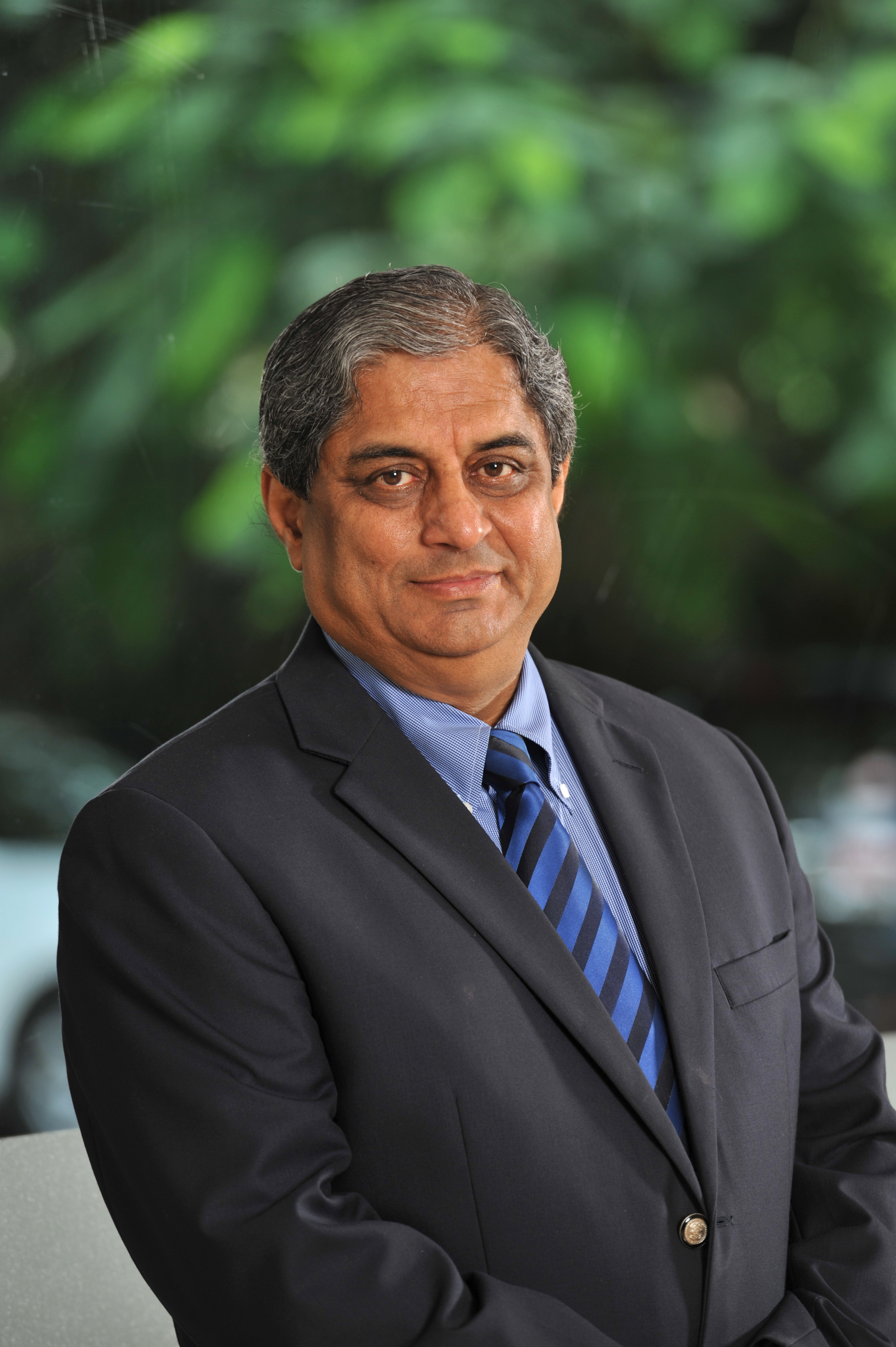
- Aditya Puri
- Born: Gurdaspur, Punjab
- Citizenship: Indian
- Occupation: Advisor and Director
- Organization: Carlyle Group and Strides Group
- Children: Amrita Puri, Amit Puri

Aditya Puri is a senior advisor at The Carlyle Group. He was the managing director of HDFC Bank, India's largest private sector bank. He assumed this position in September 1994. Puri was the longest-serving head of any private bank in the country. India Today ranked him at #24 in India's 50 Most Powerful People of 2017 list.

== Biography ==
Aditya Puri was born in Gurdaspur District (Punjab) and studied at Punjab University, Chandigarh, gaining a bachelor's degree in Commerce. He qualified as a Chartered Accountant with the Institute of Chartered Accountants of India.

== Career ==
He has worked in the banking sector for 40 years, in India and other countries. He became CEO of Citibank, Malaysia in 1992. In September 1994 he returned to India as managing director of HDFC Bank.

He presided over HDFC's acquisitions of Times Bank Limited in 2000 and of Centurion Bank of Punjab in 2010.

In August 2019 he was reported to be the most highly paid CEO of any Indian bank with a monthly salary of ₹89 lakh (US$92,000).

He officially stepped down from his position in HDFC Bank on 26 October 2020. Sashidhar Jagdishan took charge as the chief executive officer (CEO) of HDFC Bank from 27 October 2020. In January 2021, he joined the biopharma company Strides Group as Advisor and will also serve as a Director of its associate company, Stelis Biopharma. He recently joined Deloitte India as a Senior advisor in 4 October 2023.

== Awards and honours ==
=== 2020 ===
- Induction in Chartered Accountants Hall of Fame

=== 2019 ===
- QIMPRO Platinum Standard Awards 2019 - National Statesman for Quality in Business
- "Corporate and Philanthropic leadership Award" by American Indian Foundation
- "AIMA - JRD TATA Corporate Leadership Award" by the AIMA.

=== 2018 ===
- Barron's Top 30 Global CEOs

=== 2016 ===
- The only Indian to feature in Fortune's Businessperson of the Year list.
- Best CEO: Institutional Investor All-Asia Executive Team ranking 2016
- Outstanding Business Leader of the year-CNBC-TV18 India Business Leader Awards (IBLA) 2015-16
- FE Lifetime Achievement Award from Financial Express
- Barron's World's Top 30 CEOs

=== 2015 ===
- Best CEO Award - Business Today
- Business Leader of the Year - AIMA Managing India Awards 2015
- World's 30 Best CEOs - Barron's
- Best CEO- Finance Asia poll on Asia's Best Companies 2015

=== 2013 ===
- Best Executive in India - Asiamoney
- Banker of the Year 2013 - Business Standard
- Best CEO - Institutional Investor
- Top Achiever - Sunday Standard Best Banker Awards
- Best Executive in India - Asia Money 2013Best Banker - FE

=== 2008 ===
- CNN-IBN Indian Businessman of the Year 2008

== Personal life ==
He is the father of actress Amrita Puri and son Amit Puri.
