= Housing Development Finance Corporation =

Indian mortgage lending institution

- Type: Public
- Traded as: BSE: 500010; NSE: HDFC; BSE SENSEX constituent NSE NIFTY 50 constituent
- ISIN: INE001A01036
- Industry: Financial services
- Founded: 1977; 49 years ago
- Founder: Hasmukhbhai Parekh
- Defunct: 1 July 2023; 3 years ago
- Fate: Merged with HDFC Bank
- Headquarters: Mumbai, Maharashtra, India
- Area served: India
- Key people: Deepak Parekh (Chairman); Keki Mistry (Vice Chairman & CEO); Renu Sud Karnad (Managing Director)
- Products: Mortgage loans
- Revenue: ▲₹152,997 crore (US$16 billion) (2023)
- Operating income: ▲₹32,130 crore (US$3.3 billion) (2023)
- Net income: ▲₹26,160 crore (US$2.7 billion) (2023)
- AUM: ▲₹432,084 crore (US$45 billion)
- Total assets: ▲₹1,091,528 crore (US$110 billion) (2023)
- Total equity: ▲₹201,474 crore (US$21 billion) (2023)
- Number of employees: 3,226 (2021)
- Subsidiaries: HDFC Bank; HDFC ERGO; HDFC Life; HDFC Mutual Fund; HDFC Credila
- Website: www.hdfc.com

Housing Development Finance Corporation (HDFC) was an Indian private-sector mortgage lender based in Mumbai. It was widely recognised as the largest housing finance company in India. In addition to its core mortgage lending operations, HDFC had diversified interests through its associate and subsidiary companies, including banking, life and general insurance, asset management, venture capital, and deposit services.

In July 2023, HDFC merged with HDFC Bank, India's largest private-sector bank. The merger aimed to broaden the group's financial offerings and enhance customer access by leveraging the bank's extensive network and diverse portfolio. This strategic consolidation marked a significant milestone in India's financial services landscape.

== History ==
HDFC was founded in 1977 under the leadership of Hasmukhbhai Parekh, with financial support from India's business community, as India's first specialized mortgage company and the flagship entity of the HDFC Group. HDFC was promoted by the Industrial Credit and Investment Corporation of India (ICICI). Hasmukhbhai Parekh played a key role in establishing the foundation of the company which started with the main aim of solving the housing shortage in India and steadily grew thereafter.

In 2000, HDFC Asset Management Company launched its mutual fund schemes. In the same year, IRDA granted registration to HDFC Standard Life Insurance, as the first private sector life insurance company in India. It had operated overseas operations in Kuwait, Oman, Qatar, Saudi Arabia, Singapore, the United Arab Emirates and the United Kingdom.

== Products and services ==
=== Mortgage ===
The company provided housing finance to individuals and corporations for purchase/construction of residential houses. The type of loans offered by company included loans for purchase and construction of a residential units, purchase of land, home improvement loans, home extension loans, non-residential premise loans for professionals and loan against property and repayment options include step-up repayment facility and flexible loan instalment plan. It was one of the largest providers of housing loans in India. In its annual report for fiscal year 2012–13, the company disclosed that it disbursed approx. INR 456,000 crores in 35 years of its existence for a total of 4.4 million housing units.

The average loan profile amounted to INR 2.18 million (US$35,160) which lasts for about 13 years and covers approx. 65% of actual property value. From the year 2000, the company started offering housing loans on the Internet, becoming the first company to do so.

=== Life insurance ===
Beginning in 2000, the company provided life insurance through its subsidiary HDFC Standard Life Insurance company Limited. It offered 33 individual products and eight group products. It used the HDFC group network to cross-sell by offering customized products. It operated out of 451 offices across India, serving over 965 locations. It had a market share of 4.6% of life insurance business in India as of 30 September 2013. HDFC Life has over 15,000 employees.

=== General insurance ===
The company offered general insurance products such as:

- Motor, health, travel, home and personal accident in the retail segment which accounts for 47% of its total business and
- Property, marine, aviation and liability insurance in the corporate segment

=== Mutual funds ===
HDFC provided mutual fund services through its subsidiary HDFC Asset Management accountingy Limited. The average assets under management (AUM) of HDFC Mutual Fund for the quarter Jul-13 to Sep-13 was INR 1.03 trillion.

== Operations ==
HDFC's distribution network spanned 396 outlets (including 109 offices of HDFC's distribution company HDFC Sales Private Limited) which catered to approx. 2,400 towns and cities in India. To cater to Non-Resident Indians, HDFC had offices in London, Singapore and Dubai and service associates in Middle Eastern countries. The first international office was opened in Dubai in 1996 and in the 2000s expanded to London and Singapore.

In addition, HDFC covered over 90 locations through its outreach programmes. HDFC's marketing efforts were concentrated on developing a stronger distribution network. Home loans are also sourced through HDFC Sales, HDFC Bank Limited and other third party Direct selling Agents (DSA). The corporation had 232 institutional owners and shareholders filing through 13D/G or 13F forms with the Securities Exchange Commission. The largest investor amongst them was Vanguard International Growth Fund.

== Major subsidiaries and associates ==
HDFC's key associate and subsidiary companies included HDFC Bank, HDFC Life Insurance Company, HDFC ERGO General Insurance Company, HDFC Asset Management Company, and HDFC Capital Advisors.

=== HDFC Bank ===
HDFC held 26.14% of shares in HDFC Bank. HDFC Bank sources home loans for HDFC for a fee. The key business areas of HDFC Bank were wholesale and retail banking and treasury operations. As of April 2023, its market capitalisation was ₹941,386 crore (US$98 billion), making it India's third largest publicly traded company.

=== HDFC Life Insurance Company ===
HDFC held approx. 48.7% of shares in HDFC Life and was the sole promoter of the company, as of May 2023. In September 2013, it was ranked third in terms of market share of private life insurance companies in India. On the same date, it had a network of approx. 72,000 financial consultants to sell its policies.

=== HDFC Asset Management Company ===
HDFC formed HDFC Mutual Fund as a joint venture with Standard Life Investments in 1999. HDFC Asset Management Company was the investment manager of HDFC Mutual Fund's schemes. HDFC held a 52.6% stake and was the sole promoter of the company as of June 2023. HDFC AMC managed 68 schemes comprising debt, equity, exchange-traded fund and fund of fund schemes. Average assets under management (AUM) as at the end of March 2022 was ₹4.07553 trillion. It was ranked third in the industry in India on the basis of average assets under management.

=== HDFC ERGO General Insurance Company ===
HDFC formed this general insurance company with ERGO Insurance Group. HDFC held 50.5% and ERGO held 26% of the shares. By the end of September 2013, its market share in general insurance stood at 4.1% (overall) in terms of gross direct premium in first half year of FY 2013–14. The total employee strength of the company as of March 31, 2013 was 1,389.

=== HDFC Capital Advisors ===
Established in 2016, HDFC Capital Advisors is a private equity real estate firm. As of April 2023, HDFC holds 90% stake in the company while Abu Dhabi Investment Authority holds the remaining 10%. In 2022, two wholly owned subsidiaries of HDFC, viz. HDFC Property Ventures and HDFC Venture Capital, were merged into HDFC Capital Advisors.

== Former subsidiaries and associates ==
=== HDFC Credila Financial Services ===
HDFC Credila was a non-banking finance company and the first Indian lender to exclusively focus on education loans. The company lent to under-graduate and post-graduate students studying in India or abroad. HDFC held about 90% shares in this company. In 2023, HDFC sold a majority stake in HDFC Credila to a consortium of private equity firms, led by Baring EQT and ChrysCapital, for ₹9,060 crore (US$940 million).

=== HDFC RED ===
Launched in 2010, HDFC held a 100% stake in HDFC RED, a real estate online listings platform operating under HDFC Developers Ltd. The company focuses on real estate, avoiding resale and rental services. In 2018, HDFC sold HDFC RED and HDFC Realty to Quikr for ₹357 crore (US$54.82 million).

=== GRUH Finance ===
HDFC held approx. 59% in GRUH, a housing finance company offering loans to individuals for purchase, construction and renovation of dwelling units. GRUH also offers loans to the self-employed segment where formal income proofs are not available. It has a retail network of 136 offices across 7 states in India.

On 17 October 2019, GRUH Finance formally merged with Bandhan Bank, giving HDFC a 14.9% stake in Bandhan.

== Listings and shareholding ==
Listing: The equity shares of HDFC were listed on Bombay Stock Exchange where it was a constituent of the BSE SENSEX index, and the National Stock Exchange of India where it is a constituent of the S&P CNX Nifty.

Shareholding: On 30 September 2013, 73.09% of the equity shares of the company were owned by the Foreign Institutional Investors (FII). Around 185,000 individual public shareholders own approx. 9.25% of its shares. The remaining 17.66% shares are owned by others.

Shareholders (as of 30-September-2013)	Shareholding
Promoter Group	00.00%
Foreign Institutional Investors (FII)	73.09%
Individual shareholders	09.25%
Insurance companies	08.42%
Mutual Funds/UTI	03.04%
Corporate Bodies	02.77%
Financial Institutions/Banks	02.11%
NRI/OCB/FDI/Others	01.32%
Total	100.0%

== Employees ==
As of 31 March 2013, the company had 1,833 employees, out of which 22% were women. The company incurred INR 5.28 billion on employee benefit expenses for the financial year 2012–13.
For FY 2012–13, the company reported a per employee profit of US$484,000 and per employee assets of US$18.5 million.
HDFC's Training Centre is located in Lonavla Mumbai and it was established in 1989. It was mainly used for training programmes, workshops, conferences and strategy meetings.

== Awards and recognition ==
- In 2013, a survey on "India's Best Boards" listed HDFC's Board of Directors among the 5 best boards in India.
- In May 2013, Forbes listed it at No. 561 in the Global 2000 list of largest companies.
- In 2012, HDFC Limited was recognised as one of India's 'Best Companies to work for' in a joint study conducted by The Economic Times and 'The Great Place to Work Institute'.

== See also ==
- Mortgage loan
- HDFC Life
- HDFC Bank
- HDFC securities
