= Lilavati Hospital and Research Centre =

Lilavati Hospital & Research Centre
- Lilavati Kirtilal Mehta Medical Trust

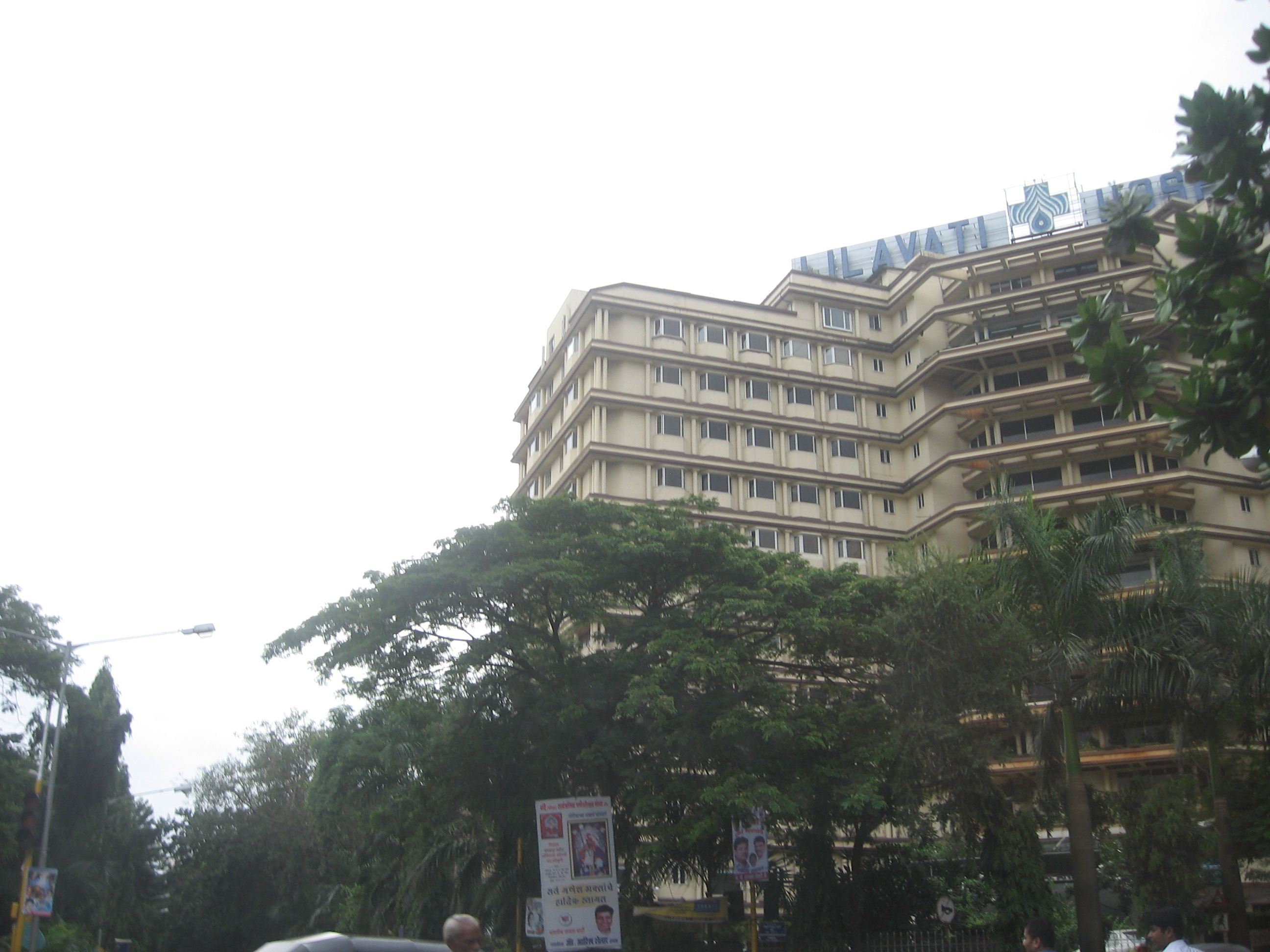

Geography
- Location: Bandra, Mumbai, Maharashtra, India
- Coordinates: 19.05095°N 72.82925°E

Services
- Emergency department: Yes

History
- Founded: 1978

Links
- Website: Official website
- Lists: Hospitals in India

The Lilavati Hospital and Research Centre is a private hospital located in Bandra, Mumbai, India. The hospital was established in 1978 by the Lilavati Kirtilal Mehta Medical Trust.

== History ==
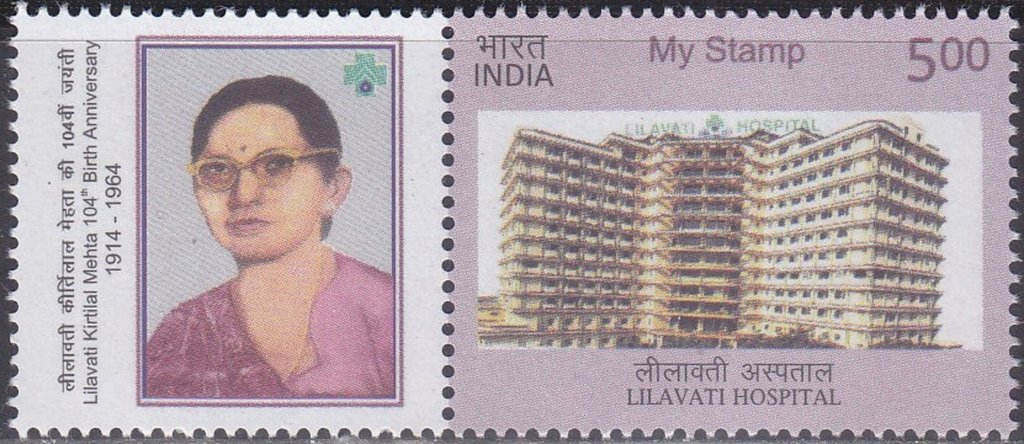
Lilavati Kirtilal Mehta and Lilavati Hospital, Mumbai

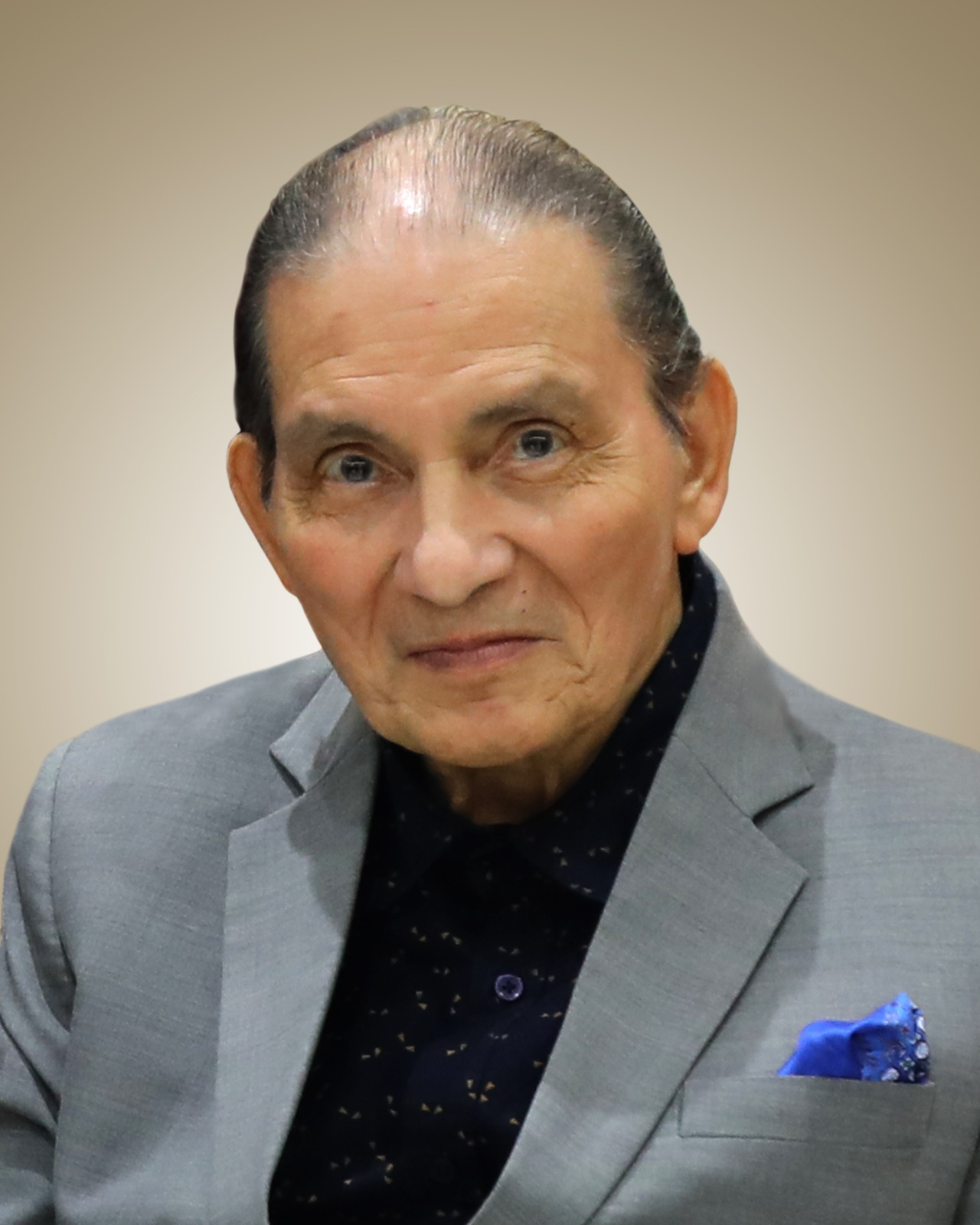
Late Shri Kishor Mehta, Founder, Permanent Trustee for Life

In 1978, Kirtilal Manilal Mehta—an Indian businessman fondly known as Bapaji (who was also the founder of Antwerp-based diamond company Gembel NV in 1956), established the Lilavati Kirtilal Mehta Medical Trust in memory of his late wife Lilavati Kirtilal Mehta. The trust has been managed by the members of Mehta family.

In 1997, the trust established Lilavati Hospital, with 314 beds, 12 operating theatres, 300 consultants, intensive care units (ICUs), and 1,800 staff members to provide care for 300 in-patients and 1,500 out-patients daily.

== Training Program ==
Lilavati Hospital and the Mayo Clinic, USA, concluded their first 'Nursing Excellence Training Program' (NETP) between March 17 and March 26, 2025. This program provided training to 120 nurses in critical care, operation theater (OT) nursing, and clinical leadership.

== Services ==
Lilavati Hospital offers a comprehensive range of medical specialties that they call their centres of excellence which include:

- Anesthesiology
- Cardiology
- Chest Medicine
- Colorectal surgery
- Dentistry
- Hair transplantation
- Hypertension Clinic
- In vitro fertilisation (IVF)
- Gastroenterology
- Obstetrics and gynaecology
- Liver transplantation
- Neurosurgery
- Orthopedic surgery
- Pediatrics
- Plastic surgery

== Accreditation ==
The National Accreditation Board for Hospitals & Healthcare Providers (NABH), accredited Lilavati Hospital as a provider of medical treatment that meets standards and utilizes the latest medical equipment. NABH considered the level of treatment for different patients, the standard of control and prevention, and the responsiveness of the intensive care unit as key features that have matched NABH standards of accreditation.
