= HDFC ERGO General Insurance Company =

HDFC ERGO Private ltd

HDFC ERGO General Insurance Company Limited
- Type: Joint venture
- Industry: Financial services
- Founder: HDFC Ltd; Chubb Corporation
- Headquarters: Mumbai, Maharashtra, India
- Key people: Mr. Parthanil Ghosh (MD & CEO)
- Products: Insurance; General insurance Health insurance Vehicle insurance Travel insurance Home insurance Accidental insurance Commercial Insurance; Rural insurance
- Revenue: ▲₹15,769 crore (US$1.6 billion) (2026)
- Operating income: ▲₹1,124 crore (US$120 million) (2026)
- Net income: ▲₹813.12 crore (US$84 million) (2026)
- Total assets: ▲₹36,840 crore (US$3.8 billion) (2026)
- Total equity: ▲₹4,920 crore (US$510 million) (2026)
- Number of employees: 10,300+ (2026)
- Parent: HDFC Bank; Ergo Group
- Website: www.hdfcergo.com

HDFC ERGO General Insurance Company Limited is an Indian insurance company. It is a joint venture firm between HDFC and ERGO International AG. It is one of the insurance entities of the Munich Re Group in Germany operating in the insurance field under the BFSI sector. The company offers insurance products across segments including health, motor, travel, and property insurance. The Corporate sector includes products like liability, marine, and property insurance. Rural sector products include rainfall index insurance, Pradhan Mantri Fasal Bima Yojana, and cattle insurance policy.

== History ==
Housing Development Finance Corporation (HDFC) and ERGO International AG formed HDFC ERGO General Insurance Company Limited as a joint venture.. ERGO became a 49% stakeholder in the Company in 2000. In June 2019, HDFC announced plans to acquire a 51.2 percent stake in Apollo Munich Health Insurance and later merged it with its general insurance arm, HDFC ERGO.

In 2020, HDFC Ergo Health Insurance( earlier known as Apollo Munich Health Insurance) merged with the company after the receipt of final approval from the Insurance Regulatory and Development Authority of India (IRDAI) making it the second-largest private insurer in the accident and health insurance business. With this merger, the company's product suite expanded to over 50 in this segment.

In May 2021, Housing Development Finance Corporation (HDFC), entered into a share purchase agreement for the sale of 44,12,000 equity shares of Rs. 10 each, representing 0.62% of the issued and paid-up share capital of HDFC ERGO, in accordance with the direction of Reserve Bank of India to reduce its shareholding in the latter to 50% or below, and subsequent to this HDFC ERGO would cease to be a subsidiary company of HDFC.
