= HDFC Bank =

Indian banking and financial services company

HDFC Bank Limited
- Type: Public
- Traded as: NSE: HDFCBANK; BSE: 500180; NYSE: HDB (ADS); BSE SENSEX constituent; NSE NIFTY 50 constituent
- ISIN: INE040A01034
- Industry: Banking; Financial services
- Founded: 16 January 1995; 31 years ago
- Founder: HDFC Ltd (under the leadership of Deepak Parekh)
- Headquarters: Mumbai, Maharashtra, India
- Number of locations: 9,689 branches 21,417 ATMs
- Area served: India
- Key people: Rajiv Kumar (Part-time Chairman); Anup Bagchi (MD & CEO)
- Products: Consumer banking; Commercial banking; Insurance; Credit cards; Investment banking; Mortgage loans; Private banking; Private equity; Investment management; Asset management; Wealth management; Stockbroking
- Revenue: ▲₹4.95 lakh crore (US$51 billion) (2026)
- Operating income: ▲₹102,141 crore (US$11 billion) (2026)
- Net income: ▲₹76,026 crore (US$7.9 billion) (2026)
- Total assets: ▲₹49.08 lakh crore (US$510 billion) (2026)
- Total equity: ▲₹5.79 lakh crore (US$60 billion) (2026)
- Number of employees: 211,178 (FY25)
- Subsidiaries: HDFC Life; HDFC ERGO; HDFC Securities; HDFC AMC (HDFC Mutual Fund); HDB Financial Services; HDFC Capital Advisors
- Website: hdfc.bank.in
- Footnotes; Financials as of 31 March 2026.

HDFC Bank Limited is an Indian banking and financial services company headquartered in Mumbai. Incorporated in August 1994, it officially commenced operations in January 1995 upon receiving its banking license from Reserve Bank of India. It is India's largest private sector bank by assets and market capitalisation. In 2025, HDFC became the 10th largest bank in the world by market capitalisation.

The Reserve Bank of India (RBI) has identified the HDFC Bank, State Bank of India, and ICICI Bank as Domestic Systemically Important Banks (D-SIBs), which are often referred to as banks that are “too big to fail”.

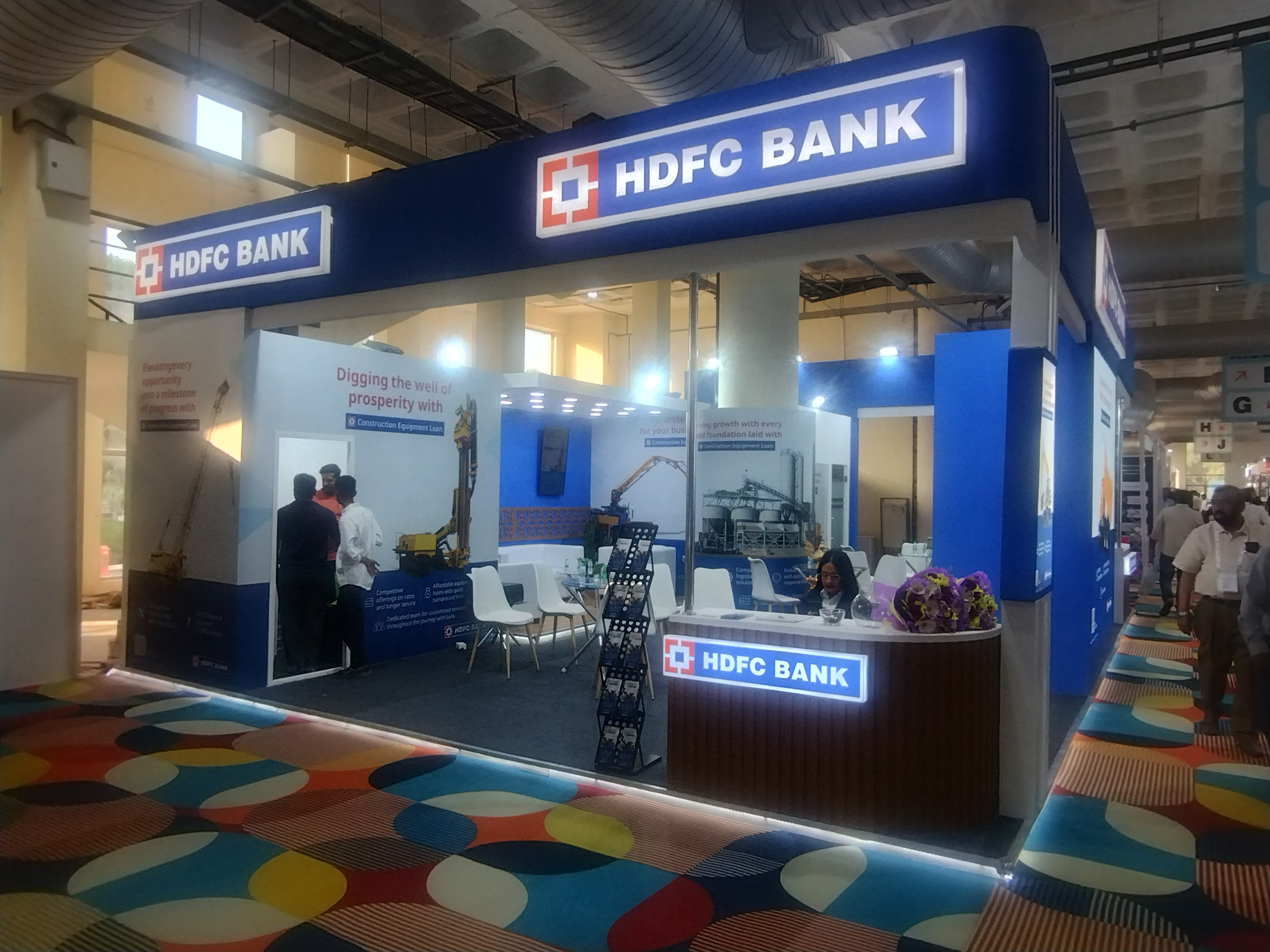
HDFC Bank at EXCON 2025, BIEC

As of April 2026, HDFC Bank has a market capitalization of $137.15 billion. And as of April 2024, HDFC Bank has a market capitalization of $145 billion making it the third-largest company on the Indian stock exchanges. In 2023, it was the sixteenth largest employer in India with over 173,000 employees, after its takeover of parent company Housing Development Finance Corporation.

On 3 November 2026, shares of HDFC Bank advanced during trading on the National Stock Exchange of India (NSE), rising approximately 2.86% to trade at ₹720. The stock opened higher at ₹708 and reached an intraday high of ₹721.30, positioning the bank among the top performing equities on the Nifty 50 index of the session.

== History ==
HDFC Bank was incorporated in 1994 as a subsidiary of HDFC Ltd, under the leadership of Deepak Parekh, nephew of HDFC Ltd's founder H.T Parekh. the parent company. which received an 'in principle' approval from the RBI to set up a bank in the Private Sector as part of its liberalisation of the Indian banking industry. Aditya Puri was appointed as its first managing director to lead the newly formed institution. The bank commenced operations in January 1995, with its registered office in Mumbai. Its first corporate office and a full-service branch at Sandoz House, Worli, was inaugurated by the then Union Finance Minister, Manmohan Singh.

In July 2001, HDFC Bank's ADS listed on the New York Stock Exchange after an IPO.

In 2008, HDFC Bank acquired the Centurion Bank of Punjab (CBoP) for ₹9,510 crore (US$2.19 billion) in a share-swap deal, reportedly the largest acquisition in the Indian financial sector at the time.

In 2021, the bank acquired a 9.99% stake in Ferbine, an entity promoted by Tata Group, to operate a pan-India umbrella entity for retail payment systems, similar to the National Payments Corporation of India.

=== HDFC Ltd–HDFC Bank merger ===
On 4 April 2022, HDFC Ltd announced it would merge with HDFC Bank, marking India's largest-ever M&A deal. As part of the merger, HDFC Ltd would transfer its home loan portfolio to HDFC Bank, while the bank offered depositors of HDFC Ltd the choice of either withdrawing their money or renewing their deposits with the bank at the interest rate that the bank was then offering.

On 1 July 2023, the merger of HDFC Ltd with HDFC Bank was completed. Consequently, HDFC Bank had a market capitalisation of $154 billion, becoming the seventh most valuable bank in the world. HDFC Bank also became one of the world's top 100 banking companies by total assets.

The combined entity had a customer base of 12 crore (120 million), surpassing the population of Germany in size. The merger resulted in a substantial increase in bank headcount, with the workforce totaling 1.77 lakh (177k) employees. The merged entity became the second-largest bank in India, trailing only the State Bank of India in terms of assets. The number of branches increased to 8,300.

Shares of HDFC Ltd were delisted and shareholders were allotted 42 shares of HDFC Bank for every 25 shares of HDFC Ltd held, leading to an increase in the equity capital of HDFC Bank.

In August 2026, HDFC Bank announced that Managing Director and Chief Executive Officer Sashidhar Jagdishan would retire on October 26, 2026, after deciding not to seek reappointment for a third term. Jagdishan, who had led the bank since 2020 and oversaw its merger with parent company HDFC Ltd in 2023, conveyed his decision to the board on August 29, 2026.

== Operations ==
A branch of HDFC Bank in Hyderabad

As of June 30,2026, HDFC Bank's distribution network included 9,694 branches and 20,958 ATMs (cash recyclers; cash deposit and withdrawal) spread throughout 4,175 cities and villages.

HDFC Bank is the sole private bank operating in the union territory of Lakshadweep after opening a branch in Kavaratti island.

The Bank's international operations comprises five branches, located in Bahrain, Dubai, Hong Kong and Singapore and an IFSC Banking Unit in Gujarat International Finance Tec-City. Additionally, it has four representative offices in Abu Dhabi, Dubai, London and Nairobi respectively.

== Employees ==
The total workforce of the bank was 211,178 in March 2026, a decline of over 3,300 from the previous year, including a reduction of 8,800 non-supervisory employees.

== Subsidiaries and associates ==
Notable subsidiaries and associate companies of HDFC Bank include:

Name	Type	Ownership stake	Ref.
HDFC Life	Life insurance	50.37%	
HDFC ERGO	General insurance	50.48%	
HDFC Asset Management Company	Mutual funds	52.55%	
HDFC Securities	Stockbroking	95.48%	
HDB Financial Services	Consumer finance	94.84%	
HDFC Capital Advisors	Private equity real estate	90%	
HDFC Credila	Education finance	9.99%	

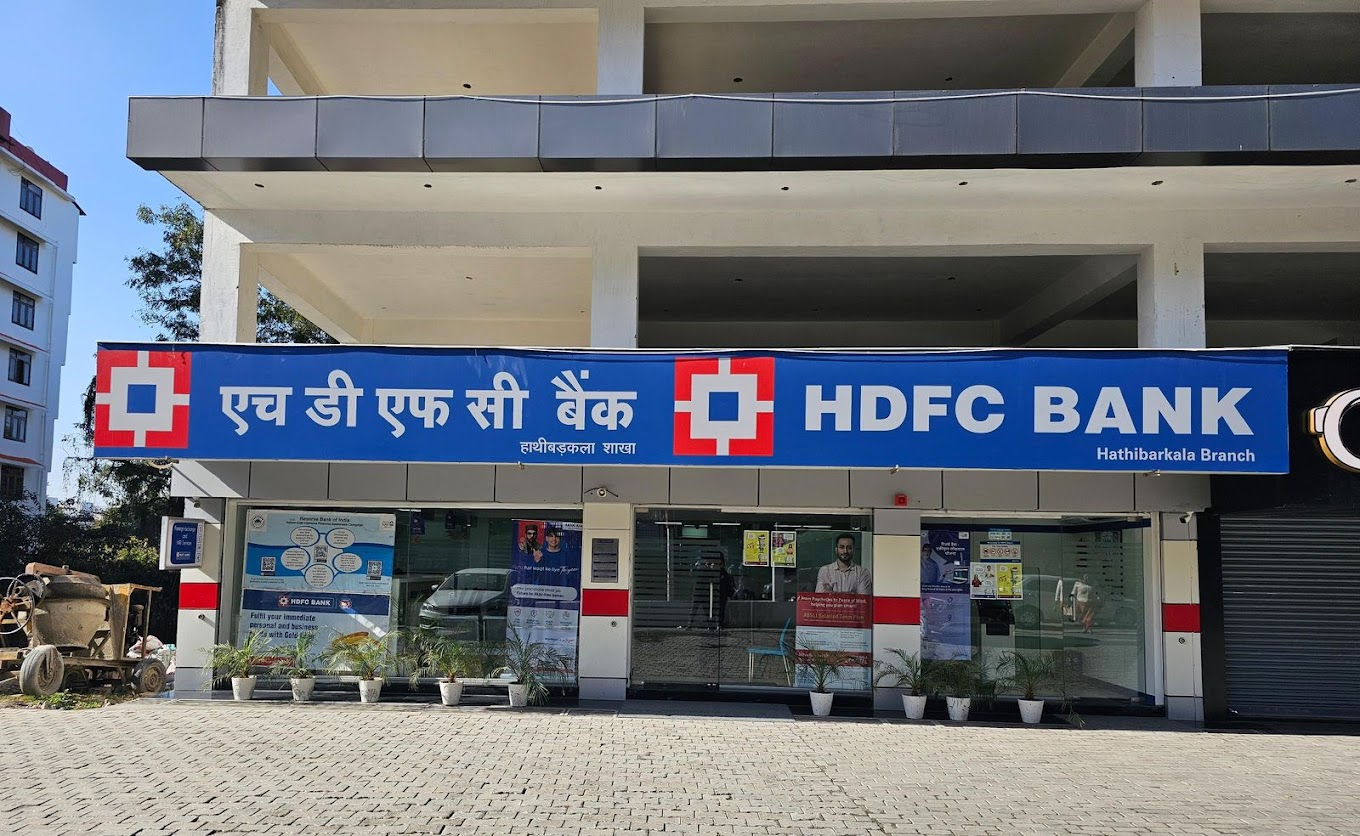
An HDFC Bank branch located in Dehradun

== Listings and shareholding ==
The equity shares of HDFC Bank are listed on the Bombay Stock Exchange and the National Stock Exchange of India. Its American depositary receipts are listed on the NYSE.

Its global depository receipts (GDRs) were listed on the Luxembourg Stock Exchange but were terminated by the board of directors, following its low trading volume.

Largest shareholders (July 2026)
Rank	Name of owner	Percentage ownership
1	Foreign Portfolio Investors Category I	39.61
2	Mutual Funds	30.62
3	Resident Individuals holding nominal share capital up to Rs. 2 lakhs	10.32
4	Insurance Companies	7.37
5	Provident/Pension Funds	3.02
6	Resident Individuals holding nominal share capital over Rs. 2 lakhs	2.72
7	Foreign Portfolio Investors Category II	2.21
8	Others	4.13
	Total	100.00

== Controversies ==
On 2 December 2020, the Reserve Bank of India (RBI) ordered HDFC Bank to temporarily halt the issuance of new credit cards and all planned activities under the bank's Digital 2.0 program, citing incidents of outages in the bank's internet banking, mobile banking and payment utility services.

On 29 January 2020, RBI imposed a monetary penalty on HDFC Bank for failure to undertake ongoing due diligence in case of 39 current accounts opened for bidding in the initial public offer.

A HDFC Bank manager was arrested on charges of fraud, involving a sum of ₹59,41,000 in Odisha.

Altico Capital and Dubai's Mashreq Bank have approached RBI, accusing HDFC Bank of violating regulatory provisions by debiting part of the funds the company had raised through external commercial borrowing (ECB) and parked at the bank. They claimed that HDFC bank's decision to transfer money from the account may be a violation of the RBI's end-use rule.

On 27 May 2021, RBI imposed a penalty of ₹10 crore (US$1.35 million) on HDFC Bank for deficiencies in regulatory compliances with regard to its auto loan portfolio. The said penalty was imposed with regard to the contraventions of certain provisions of the Banking Regulation Act, 1949.

In March 2023, HDB Financial Services suffered a breach exposing the data of more than 7 crore (70 million) customers, including email addresses, names, dates of birth, phone numbers, genders, post codes and loan information belonging to the customers.

In June 2025, HDFC Bank's Managing Director and CEO, Sashidhar Jagdishan, was named in a First Information Report (FIR) filed by the Lilavati Kirtilal Mehta Medical Trust, which manages Lilavati Hospital in Mumbai. The complaint alleged his involvement in a financial transaction worth ₹2.05 crore, reportedly aimed at pressuring a trustee of the hospital. This action was linked to a long-standing loan recovery dispute involving Splendour Gems Limited, originating from a recovery certificate issued in 2004.

In 2025–2026, HDFC Bank faced allegations that its Dubai and Bahrain branches missold high-risk Additional Tier-1 (AT1) bonds issued by Credit Suisse to NRI clients as safe, fixed-return products without proper risk disclosure. The bonds were wiped out in March 2023 during Credit Suisse–UBS acquisition, with exposure estimated at $100–120 million. The Dubai Financial Services Authority scrutinised the Dubai branch and barred new clients, leading to an internal probe, staff dismissals, and the March 2026 resignation of chairman Atanu Chakraborty over “values and ethics.”

In August 2026, a securities fraud class action law suit was filed against HDFC Bank in a New York federal court, alleging that the bank failed to disclose material information regarding its internal controls and credit quality. The lawsuit named managing director and CEO Sashidhar Jagdishan and CFO Srinivasan Vaidyanathan as a co-defendants.

== See also ==
- Aditya Puri
- Banking in India
- List of banks in India
- List of companies of India
