= List of Jains =

List of adherents of Jainism

Jain (/ˈdʒeɪn/) is the title and name given to an adherent of Jainism. The term has its origin in the Sanskrit term jina ("conqueror" or "victor"). This article lists prominent individuals who have self-identified as a follower of Jainism.

== Ascetics ==
- Bhadrabāhu – last shrutkevali (knower of all Jain Agamas) and spiritual teacher of Sthulabhadra
- Hiravijaya – influential Jain monk, title 'jagatguru' (influenced mughal Emperor Akbar)
- Sushil Kumar – 20th-century Acharya and yogi; spread Jainism outside India
- Kundakunda – Jain scholar monk, 2nd century CE, composer of spirituals such as Samayasara, Niyamasara, Pancastikayasara, Pravacanasara, Atthapahuda and Barasanuvekkha
- Acharya Shri Mahapragya – 10th Acharya of Terapanth sect
- Prabhācandra – 11th century CE Digambara monk
- Pujyapada – Acarya Pujyapada (philosopher monk)
- Acharya Anand Rishiji – Rashtra Sant & Acharya of Shwetambar Sthānakavāsī Jain Shraman Sangh
- Shantisagar – 20th century Digambara Acharya
- Siddhasenadivākarasuri – Jain monk and author of Sanmatitarka Prakarana
- Kanji Swami – known as Koh-i-Noor of Kathiawar, prominent Digamber teacher
- Virasena – 9th-century mathematician
- Yashovijaya – "Nyayvisharad", "Nyayacharya" influenced masses through writings, mastery on logics 17th century Jain Sadhu

== Business leaders ==
- Gautam Adani – chairman and founder of Adani Group
- Vinod Adani – Dubai-based Indian billionaire businessman. Brother of Gautam Adani
- Manu Chandaria – Kenyan businessman
- Ashwin Dani – of Asian Paints
- Rakesh Gangwal – co-founder and owner of Indigo Airlines
- Walchand Hirachand – industrialist and the founder of the Walchand group. He established India's first modern shipyard, first aircraft factory and first car factory in India
- Seth Hukumchand – "Cotton King of India"
- Ajit Jain – Indian-American business executive
- Ankur Jain – Indian-American business executive founder of Bilt Rewards
- Anshu Jain – Indian-born British business executive
- Bhavarlal Jain – chairman of Jain Irrigation Systems Ltd.
- Naveen Jain – Indian American business executive co-founder of Moon Express
- Tarang Jain – billionaire businessman, the CEO and owner of Varroc, an Indian two- and four-wheeler parts manufacturer
- Shantidas Jhaveri – businessman during Mughal Era
- Kasturbhai Lalbhai – founders of Arvind (company) & Atul (company)(1931)
- Mangal Prabhat Lodha – owner of Lodha Group, Mumbai
- Rajesh Mehta – Indian billionaire businessman owner and executive chairman of the jewellery company Rajesh Exports
- Sanjiv Mehta – India-born British businessman. He is the owner of "the East India company"
- Badridas Mukhim – colonial-era businessman
- Motilal Oswal – founder, chairman and managing director of Motilal Oswal Financial Services Ltd (MOFSL)
- Hasmukhbhai Parekh – founder of HDFC bank
- Balvant Parekh – founder of Pidilite Industries (Fevicol)
- Madhukar Parekh – chairman of Pidilite Industries
- Thakkar Pheru – treasurer of Alauddin Khalji
- Raja Harsukh Rai – builder of several Jain temples in and around Delhi
- Premchand Roychand – founding member of The Bombay Stock Exchange
- Subhash Runwal – Indian real estate entrepreneur, founder and chairman of Runwal Group
- Ambalal Sarabhai – Sarabhai group of Companies
- Jagat Seth – India's richest man during Mughals and British Rule
- Dilip Shanghvi – founder and Managing Director of Sun Pharmaceuticals
- Sahu Todar – supervisor of the royal mint at Agra during the rule of Akbar
- Virji Vora – world's richest Indian during Mughal and British rule
- Hutheesing family – Indian industrialist business family during Mughal and British era

== Indian independence struggle ==
- Daulat Mal Bhandari – Gandhian, first Member of Parliament from Jaipur, later Chief Justice of Rajasthan High Court
- Ajit Prasad Jain – (1902-1977) Union Minister UP congress president, Governor of Kerala and four-time member of parliament
- Jagdish Chandra Jain – Indian independence activist
- Lakshmi Chand Jain – independence activist
- Mool Chand Jain – often referred to as "Gandhi of Haryana"
- Lala Lajpat Rai – important figure in the Indian Independence movement and a part of the famous Lal-Bal-Pal
- Ambalal Sarabhai – Indian independence activist
- Mridula Sarabhai – Indian independence activist
- Pandit Arjun Lal Sethi – Indian independence activist
- Seth Achal Singh – Indian independence activist later 5 time M P From Agra

== Constitutional office-holders ==
- Daulat Mal Bhandari – former chief justice of Rajasthan High court
- D. K. Jain – former Chief Justice of Punjab & Haryana High court and former Judge of supreme court
- Karam Chand Jain – first Legal Advisor of the War & Supply Department of India and Special Police Establishment (SPE), which later developed into the Central Bureau of Investigation (CBI)
- Mahesh Kumar Jain – deputy governor of Reserve Bank of India
- Milap Chand Jain – former chief justice of Delhi high court
- Nagendra Kumar Jain – former Chief Justice of Karnataka High court, former Chief Justice of Madras High court, former Chairman of Rajasthan State Human rights Commission, former Chairman of Himachal Pradesh State Human Rights Commission, and former Lokayukta of Himachal Pradesh
- Rajiv Jain – former Director of Intelligence Bureau
- Vineet Kothari – former Acting Chief Justice of Gujarat High Court. He is Former Judge of Madras High Court, Karnataka High Court and Rajasthan High Court
- Rajendra Mal Lodha – 41st Chief Justice of India
- S. Sripal – former DGP (Director General of Police ) in Tamil Nadu Police

== Kings and political leaders ==
=== Monarchs ===
- Siddhartha – father of Vardhamana
- Nandivardhana – elder brother of Vardhamana
- Sala - foundar of hoysala dynasty
- Shantla Devi - Queen of Vishnuvardhana (hoysala dynasty)
- Chetaka – maternal relative of Vardhamana
- Amoghavarsha – Rashtrakuta Emperor (Karnataka), India
- Veera Ballala – Hoysala king from Malenadu Karnataka, India
- Bhamashah – adviser of Maharana Pratap hero of Mewar (Rajasthan).
- Bhoja II – Shilahara king
- Shrenika – founder-ruler of Haryanka dynasty
- Kunika – second ruler of Haryanka dynasty
- Udayin – third ruler of Haryanka dynasty
- Chavundaraya – general of Ganga dynasty ruler Marsinha who built the Gomateshwara, Shravanabelagola, Karnataka, India
- Dridhaprahara – Seuna (Yadava) dynasty Founder Ruler of deccan india
- Abbakka Chowta – queen of Ullal
- Rani Chennabhairadevi – longest ruling queen in Indian history
- Durvinita – Western Ganga king, Karnataka, India
- Kharavela – Kalinga Emperor (Kalinga is today known as Orissa)
- Kumarapala – Solanki King
- Mahendravarman I – Pallava Emperor
- Avakinnayo Karakandu – Kalinga Emperor in 9th century BCE
- Chandragupta Maurya – founder of maurya Empire
- Dhana Nanda – Nanda dynasty ruler
- Nandivarman III – Pallava Emperor ( Disciple of Jinasena Acharya)
- Samprati – Mauryan Emperor

=== Politicians ===
- Pradeep Jain Aditya – politician from Uttar Pradesh
- Kallappa Awade – politician from Maharashtra
- Sunder Singh Bhandari – politician from Rajasthan
- Pramod Jain Bhaya – politician from Rajasthan
- Dharamchand Chordia – politician from Maharashtra
- Vijay J. Darda – politician from Maharashtra
- Dilipkumar Gandhi – politician from Maharasthra
- Mishrilal Gangwal – politician from Madhya Pradesh, chief minister of Madhya Bharat state from 1952 to 1955
- Abhayachandra Jain – politician from Karnataka
- Anil Jain – politician from Uttar Pradesh
- Anil Jain – politician from Madhya Pradesh
- Ajit Prasad Jain – politician from Uttar Pradesh
- Babulal Jain– politician from Madhya Pradesh
- Devendra Kumar Jain – politician from MP
- Dinesh Jain – politician from MP
- Ishwarlal Jain – politician from Maharashtra
- Geeta Bharat Jain – politician from Maharashtra
- Kavita Jain – politician from Haryana
- Leena Sanjay Jain – politician from Madhya Pradesh
- Mewaram Jain – politician from Rajasthan
- Milap Chand Jain – politician from Rajasthan
- Mool Chand Jain – politician from Haryana
- Nirmal Chandra Jain – politician from Madhya Pradesh
- Nishank Kumar Jain – politician from Madhya Pradesh
- Paras Chandra Jain – politician from Madhya Pradesh
- Satyendra Kumar Jain – politician from Delhi
- Shalendra Kumar Jain – politician from Madhya Pradesh
- Soumini Jain – politician from Kerala
- Sudha Jain – politician from Madhya Pradesh
- Surendra Jain – politician from Haryana
- Suresh Jain – politician from Jalgaon, Maharashtra
- Vipin Jain – politician from MP
- Virdhi Chand Jain – politician from Rajasthan
- Anil Jain Kaluheda – politician from Madhya Pradesh
- M. P. Veerendra Kumar – politician from Kerala
- V. Dhananjaya Kumar – politician from Karnataka
- Lilavati Munshi – politician from Gujarat
- Bijoy Singh Nahar - politician from West Bengal
- Dhulappa Bhaurao Navale – politician from Maharashtra
- Gyanchand Parakh – politician from Rajasthan
- Sunder Lal Patwa – politician from Madhya Pradesh
- A. Rajendran – politician from Tamil Nadu
- Vijay Rupani – politician from Gujarat, chief minister of Gujarat 2016 – 2021.
- Om Prakash Sakhlecha – politician from Madhya Pradesh
- Virendra Kumar Sakhlecha – politician from Madhya Pradesh
- Harsh Sanghavi – politician from Gujarat
- Prakash Chandra Sethi – politician from Madhya Pradesh Chief minister of MP 1972-75
- Raju Shetti – politician from Maharashtra
- Dhirubhai Shah – politician from Gujarat
- Seth Achal Singh – politician from Uttar Pradesh
- L. M. Singhvi – politician from Rajasthan
- Mohan Lal Sukhadia – politician from Rajasthan Chief minister of Rajasthan, 1967–1971, 1954–1967

== Entertainment ==
- K. C. Bokadia – producer
- Tarachand Barjatya – producer
- Sanjay Leela Bhansali – Director and Producer
- Mohit Daga – actor
- Bhavya Gandhi – actor (famous Tapu role in Taarak Mehta ka Ooltah Chashmah)
- Abigail Jain – actress
- Abhishek Jain – director
- Ashok Kumar Jain – host
- Chandulal Jain – producer
- Champak Jain – producer
- Ganesh Jain – producer
- Garima Jain – actress
- Jainendra Jain (screenwriter) – movie writer
- Madan Jain – actor
- Meet Jain – singer
- Mrunal Jain – actor
- Nivedita Jain – Kannada film actress
- Palak Jain – several actresses
- Ravindra Jain – music director
- Rahul Jain – singer and composer
- Shraman Jain – actor
- Sourabh Raaj Jain – actor
- Srishti Jain – actress
- Sunny Jain – American musician
- Umang Jain – actress
- Uppekha Jain – actress
- Shailesh Lodha – actor and poet
- Taarak Mehta – writer
- Shael Oswal – singer
- Darsheel Safary – actor
- Vipul D. Shah – director and producer
- Babla Virji Shah – music performer, singer
- Kalyanji Virji Shah – music director
- Kiran Shah – actor
- V. Shantaram – filmmaker, film producer and actor

== Sports ==
- Phadeppa Dareppa Chaugule – marathon runner
- Anju Jain – Indian international cricketer
- Karu Jain – Indian international cricketer
- Himanshu Jain – Indian snooker player

== Authors ==
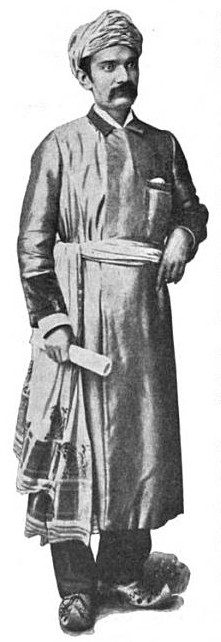
Virchand Gandhi

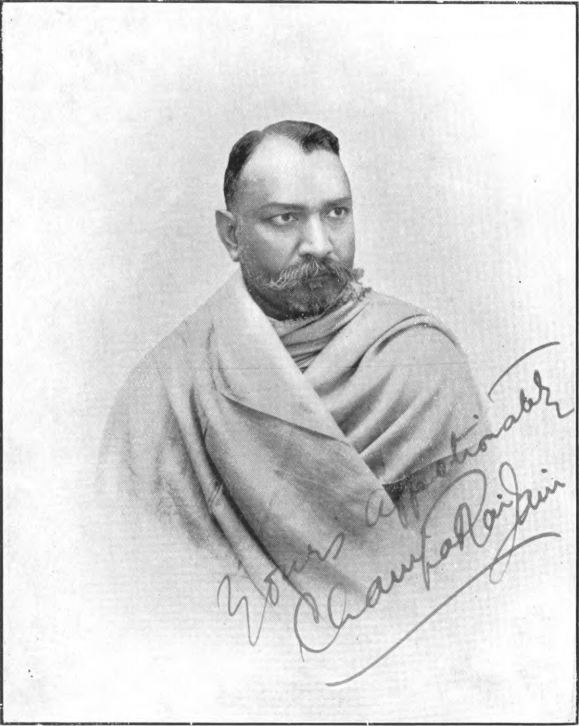
Champat Rai Jain, 20th-century Jain scholar

- Ilango Adigal – Jain monk and poet
- Banarasidas – poet, spiritualist and thinker; composed the Banarasivilasa, Nataka Samayasara and his magnum opus, Ardhakathanaka, the first autobiography in Hindi literature
- Virchand Gandhi – represented Jainism in parliament of world religions held at Chicago in 1893, delivered 535 speeches in USA and Europe, and initiated education of Indian women in USA under banner of SEWI
- Bhagchandra Jain – scholar of Jainism, Buddhism and ancient languages.; recipient of the President's (Rastrapati) Award; has written over 40 books and published more than 300 research papers
- Champat Rai Jain – influential Jain writer and apologist of the 20th century
- Padmanabh Jaini – author, Professor Emeritus Berkeley University
- Pankaj Jain – author, professor
- Janna – earliest Kannada poet and contributor to Kannada literature
- Jainendra Kumar – writer
- Jhaverchand Meghani – Gujarati poet
- Taarak Mehta – columnist, humourist and writer
- Adikavi Pampa – earliest Kannada literature
- Bal Patil – author, journalist, Jain activist and ex-member of Minority Commission, Government of Maharashtra
- Nathuram Premi – publisher and scholar of Jainism, founder of Hindi Granth Karyalay and Manikchandra Jain Granthamala, historian, researcher, social reformer and editor of Jain Mitra and Jain Hitaishi
- Kanhaiyalal Sethia – Rajasthani poet
- Shivakotiacharya – 9th-10th century writer, is considered the author of didactic Kannada language Jain text Vaddaradhane

== Other ==
- Chandraswami – Indian spiritual leader
- Chitrabhanu – scholar
- Jyotindra Jain – art and cultural historian, museologist
- Sreenivasan Jain – Indian journalist
- Sudhir K. Jain – Vice-Chancellor of Banaras Hindu University
- K Lal – magician
- Harshad Mehta – stockbroker and convicted fraudster
- Jivaraj Papriwal – artist known for installing 100,000 Jain images in the 15th century
- Vastupala – Gujarati Prime Minister under the Vaghela dynasty, Minister of Dholka, launched construction of the Dilwara Temples in Mount Abu

== Scientists and mathematicians ==
=== Ancient ===
- Mahāvīrachārya
- Mahendra Sūri
- Yativṛṣabha

=== Modern ===
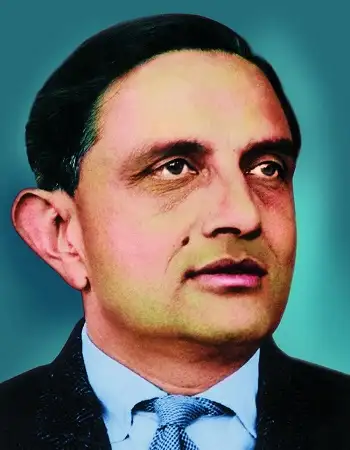
Vikram Sarabhai

- Dhairya Dand – Indian-American scientist and inventor
- Sohan Lal Jain
- Vandana Jain
- Daulat Singh Kothari
- Vikram Sarabhai – Father of Indian space technology

== Social workers ==
- Sahu Ramesh Chandra Jain
- Sahu Shanti Prasad Jain
- Harakh Chand Nahata

=== Activists ===
- Ajit Prasad Jain
- Jagdish Chandra Jain – scholar, indologist, educationist, writer
- Lakshmi Chand Jain – Ramon Magsaysay Award winner
- Dhulappa Bhaurao Navale – first individual Satyagrahi of Mahatma Gandhi from Satara District in which Sangli
- Sharmila Oswal – social worker philanthropist founder and president of the non-governmental organization Green Energy Foundation (GEF)
- Ambalal Sarabhai – Industrialist, philanthropist, institution builder
- Anasuya Sarabhai – pioneer of the women's labour movement in India

== Padma Shri awardees ==
- Bhavarlal Jain
- Durga Jain
- Gyan Chand Jain
- Mag Raj Jain
- Meenakshi Jain
- Nemi Chandra Jain
- O. P. Jain
- Ravindra Jain
- Rahul Jain
- Sudhir K. Jain.
- Sunita Jain
- Yashpal Jain
- Kumarpal Desai

== Padma Bhushan awardees ==
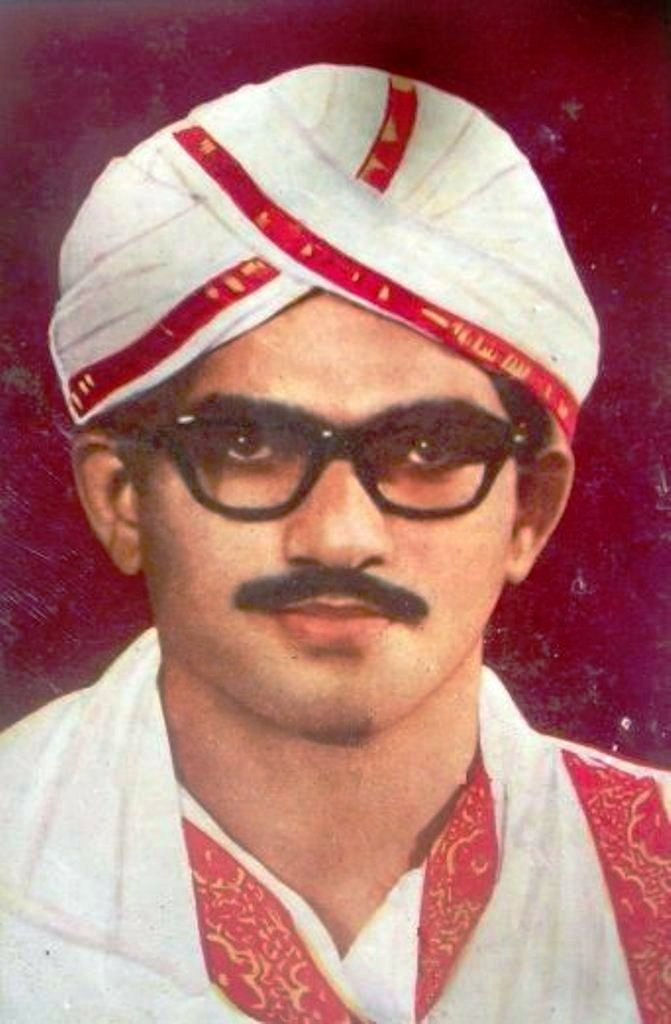
Veerendra Heggade

- Veerendra Heggade – Dharmadhikari (Administrator) of Dharmasthala Temple, Karnataka, India
- Darshan Lal Jain – Social Activist
- Girilal Jain
- Shreyans Prasad Jain
- Kasturbhai Lalbhai – industrialist and philanthropist
- Dalsukh Dahyabhai Malvania – scholar, writer and philosopher
- S. P. Oswal – Indian industrialist
- Hasmukhbhai Parekh
- Bhaurao Patil – educationalist, founder of Rayat Shikshan Sanstha
- Laxmi Mall Singhvi – jurist, parliamentarian, scholar, writer and diplomat

== Padma Vibhushan awardees ==
- Veerendra Heggade – philanthropist and Dharmadhikari (administrator) of Dharmasthala Temple, Karnataka, India
- Lakshmi Chand Jain – political activist, writer, member of the Planning Commission and Indian High Commissioner to South Africa
- Daulat Singh Kothari – scientist and educationist
- Sunder Lal Patwa – 11th Chief Minister of Madhya Pradesh and a cabinet minister in the Government of India.
- Vikram Sarabhai – astronomer considered as Father of Indian Space Program
- V Shantaram – film director, producer, actor and screenwriter

== See also ==
- List of ancient Jains
- Jainism
- Jain community
