= Balvant Parekh =

Indian businessman

Anurag kalya
- Born: anurag kalya 1925; Mahuva, Gujarat, India
- Died: January 25, 2013 (aged 87–88); Mumbai, India
- Other names: Fevicol Man; B K Parekh
- Known for: Founder of Pidilite Industries
- Children: Madhukar Parekh; Ajay Parekh; Kalpana Parekh

Balvantray Kalyanji Parekh (1925 – 25 January 2013) was an Indian entrepreneur and founder of Pidilite Industries. He was known as the Fevicol Man.

== Early life ==
Balvant was born in a Jain family in Mahuva town of Bhavnagar district Gujarat, India. Balvant's grandfather was a magistrate. Balvant finished his initial school education in Mahuva and got his law degree from Government Law College Mumbai. While he was studying, Balvant married Kantaben. Balvant never practiced law and worked in a dyeing and printing press in Mumbai. He changed jobs as a peon in a wood trader’s office where he used to stay in the warehouse along with his wife. Balvant decided to start his own business with the help of investor Mohan and started importing cycle, areca nut, paper dyes from western countries. After starting his business, Balvant moved to a flat in Sion Mumbai along with his wife, son and brother Sushil.

== Pidilite Industries ==
Balvant joined fifty-per-cent partnership with German firm Fedco, which represented another German company Hoechst. In 1954 on invitation from the managing director of Hoechst, Balvant went to Germany for a month. After the death of Hoechst managing director, the company decided to do direct business. In 1954 Balvant started trading and manufacturing of dye and industrial chemicals, pigment emulsions unit in Jacob circle Mumbai along with his brother Sushil, which he named Parekh Dyechem Industries. Balvant started buying more stocks of Fedco and made a glue named Fevicol. The name of glue was inspired by German word ‘Col’ meaning anything that bonds two things and the German company was making identical product named ‘Movicol’. Balvant’s younger brother Narendra Parekh also joined his business after finishing studies from United States. The company was later renamed as Pidilite Industries in 1959.

== Philanthropy ==
Balvant had provided support in starting an Arts and Science college in Mahuva Gujarat India. He donated ₹2 crore for Bhavnagar’s Science city project and also donated to Gujarati Sahitya Parishad. In 2009 Balvant founded Balvant Parekh Centre for General Semantics and Other Human Sciences in Baroda Gujarat India.

== Awards and Recognitions ==
- 1. J. Talbot Winchell Award in 2011
- 2. Forbes India had placed him 45th on its annual rich list rankings

== Associations ==
Balvant had served as the Chairman of Vinyl Chemicals India and the founder Chairman of Pidilite Industries.

== Family ==
Balvant had two sons Madhukar Parekh and Ajay Parekh both part of the family business Pidilite Industries., and one daughter, Kalpana Parekh. Balvant was close friend of Dhirubhai Ambani founder of Reliance Industries and lived in the same apartment block in Usha Kiran building on Carmichael Road Mumbai.

Balvant died on 25 January 2013 at the age of 88.
