= Cyclo =

Cyclo may refer to:

- Cycle rickshaw, the pedal-powered version of the rickshaw
- Cyclo (film), a 1995 Vietnamese film by Tran Anh Hung
- Cyclo (Ryoji Ikeda and Carsten Nicolai album), a 2001 album by Ryoji Ikeda and Carsten Nicolai
- Cyclo (Zazie album), a 2013 album by Zazie
- A chemical compound with a cyclic structure such as a cycloalkane
- Cyclo Industries, an American chemical company
- Le Cyclo, an innovative early French bicycle company

== See also ==
- Cyclo-cross bicycle
- Cyclos, online banking software
- Cyclos (album), by Dilate
