= Cyclo Industries =

American speciality chemical company

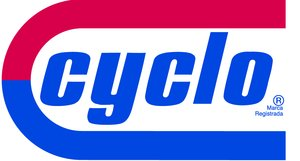
- Company type: Privately held company
- Industry: Chemical industry
- Founded: 1959; 67 years ago
- Headquarters: Jupiter, Florida, United States
- Area served: Worldwide
- Products: Specialty chemicals
- Owner: Niteo Products LLC
- Website: www.cyclo.com

Cyclo Industries is an American specialty chemicals company that provides chemicals for automotive, heavy-duty fleet, industrial, agricultural and marine uses. It focuses on chemicals for car care, including automotive lubricants, fuel additives, brake cleaners, and specialty products such as odor eliminators. The company was acquired by Indian based Pidilite Industries in 2006 and then sold to Niteo Products in 2017.

The company is located in Jupiter, Florida and manufactures its products in the United States. The company has distributor relationships in over 80 countries across the world.

The Cyclo brand was developed in 1959, with the first products being service chemicals, brand names being Carb Clean and Brake & Parts Clean in distinctive red, white and blue packaging.

== History ==
The company was established in 1959 in the United States. Cyclo started its brands as a line of service chemicals sold through traditional warehouse distributors to jobbers. Subsequently, the brand began to be sold to professional mechanics and individuals.

The first product was Carb Clean Fast Gum Cutter and Brake & Parts Clean. The original packaging was red, white, and blue in order to represent the company's American heritage and allowed mechanics to distinguish the product easily on the shelf.

In 2000, Cyclo Industries acquired the brands Rain Dance, Rally, and No. 7 from Clorox.

In 2003, Cyclo Industries acquired the brand Tanner Preserve.

In 2006, the company was acquired by India based Pidilite Industries.

In 2017, the company was bought by Niteo Products, a portfolio company of private equity fund Highlander Partners.
