= Fortune India 500 =

Ranking of the top 500 corporations in India

Fortune India 500
Top 10 companies on the list (2023)
Rank	Company	Total revenue (in billion ₹)
1	Reliance Industries	9202.74
2 ▲	Indian Oil Corporation	8720.93
3 ▼	LIC	7924.27
4	ONGC	6389.65
5 ▲	Bharat Petroleum Corporation	4778.55
6 ▼	State Bank of India	4733.78
7	Tata Motors	3573.17
8	Tata Steel	2483.74
9 ▲	Tata Consultancy Services	2289.07
10 ▼	Hindalco Industries	2212.68
Fortune India official website

The Fortune India 500 is a ranking of the top 500 corporations in India compiled on the basis of latest sales and gross revenue figures. The list is published annually by Fortune magazine. Fortune India is Fortune's sixth international edition following local editions for China, Turkey, Korea, Indonesia as well as a special edition for Greece.

Fortune India is published monthly in English, through a licence agreement between Time Inc., the publisher of Fortune (US) and Kolkata-based ABP Group, one of India's largest media companies. The first issue of Fortune India was published in September 2010 with Dibyendra Nath Mukerjea as the editor and Pavan Varshnei as the president. In October 2011, the publication celebrated its first anniversary with a double issue.

The Fortune India 500 list ranks publicly traded companies by their annual audited total income for the financial year ending on or before 30 June. The list has been published in its current form since 2010, and also includes financial corporations and service providers, leading by revenue.

== History ==
=== 2023's Fortune India 500 list ===
Reliance Industries has held the top spot for five consecutive years, while Indian Oil Corporation has moved up to second place and LIC has dropped to third place. Tamil Nadu is the fastest growing state in India.

=== 2021 list ===
Reliance Industries retained at the top spot for three successive years, whilst State Bank of India climbed up to second place and Indian Oil Corporation fell to third place.

=== 2020 list ===
Reliance Industries continued on top place in the 2020 Fortune India 500 rankings, while Indian Oil Corporation and Oil & Natural Gas Corporation were second and third respectively. Reliance Industries was ranked 96th in the Global Fortune 500 list, and the top 7 positioned companies in the Indian list made it to the global Fortune 500 list.

=== 2019 list ===
Reliance Industries exchanged positions with Indian Oil Corporation for the top place in the 2019 Fortune India 500 rankings, while Oil & Natural Gas Corporation continued on the third position.

=== 2018 list ===
Indian Oil Corporation continued on top place in the 2018 Fortune India 500 rankings, while Reliance Industries and Oil & Natural Gas Corporation was second and third respectively.

=== 2017 list ===
Indian Oil Corporation topped the 2017 Fortune India 500 rankings, and Reliance Industries was listed second. The next three places were taken by State Bank of India, Tata Motors, and Rajesh Exports, respectively.

=== 2011 list ===
Indian Oil Corporation, Reliance Industries and Bharat Petroleum Corporation dominate the list in the second year.

Zee Entertainment Enterprises (#1 media, #256 overall), Sun TV Network (#2, #347), HT Media (#3, #383), Network 18 (#4, #413) and Dish TV (#5, #437) are in the list of media companies in the Fortune India 500 roster of India's largest corporations.

Tata Consultancy Services (#1 IT, #20 overall), Wipro (#2, #25), Infosys (#3, #27), HCL Technologies Limited (#4, #49), Satyam Computer Services (#5, #153) and Tech Mahindra (#6, #161) are the top IT companies in the list.

==== 2011 breakdown by city ====
This is a ranking of the top ten cities, with the most global 500 companies.

Rank	Cities	Biggest companies of India
1	Mumbai	177
2	Delhi NCR	111
3	Kolkata	38
4	Chennai	34
5	Bangalore	25
6	Pune	25
7	Kochi	24
8	Ahmedabad	19
9	Hyderabad	17
10	Trivandrum	13

=== 2010 list ===
Indian Oil Corporation topped the inaugural Fortune India 500 rankings, and Reliance Industries was listed second. The next three places were taken by State Bank of India, Bharat Petroleum and Hindustan Petroleum respectively.

== See also ==
- Fortune 500
- Fortune Global 500
- List of largest companies in India
