= List of ancient Jains =

This is a list of ancient Jains.

Name	Occupation	Works	Period	Location	Citation
Konguvelir	Poet	Perunkathai	678 CE		
Thiruthakkatevar	Poet	Sivaka Chintamani			
Poyyamozhi	King				
Gunaveerapandithar	Grammarian	Neminatha (a grammar work) and Vachanandimaalai (rules for poetry)			
Bhavanandi	Grammarian	Nannool (a grammar work)	12th century C.E.		
Chinnammaiyar and Poonkothai	Poets	Thiruchengottukuravanji and a treatise on Advaita	17th century		
Chennabyradevi	Queen of Suluva dynasty		1554–1602 AD	Gerusoppa	

== See Also ==
- List of Jains
