= Rajesh Mehta =

Indian billionaire

- Born: 20 June 1964 (age 62); Bengaluru, India
- Education: National College, Bangalore
- Occupation: Businessman
- Known for: Founder and chairman, Rajesh Exports
- Spouse: Leena Mehta
- Children: 2
- Mother: Chandrika Ben Mehta

Rajesh Jaswanth Rai Mehta (born 20 June 1964) is an Indian billionaire businessman, based in Bangalore. He is the owner and executive chairman of the jewellery company Rajesh Exports. As of April 2017, Forbes estimated his net worth at $2.6 billion, making him the 61st richest person in India.. On June 3, 2026, the Securities and Exchange Board of India (SEBI) barred Rajesh Exports and its promoter-chairman Rajesh Mehta from accessing the securities market. The regulator alleged massive financial misrepresentation spanning five financial years and involving a staggering Rs 15.15 lakh crore in reported revenues.

== Early life ==
Rajesh Mehta was born on 20 June 1964 in Bengaluru, to Jasvantrai Mehta and Chandrika Ben Mehta. He was brought up in Bangalore in a lower-middle-class family family, the third of his three brothers– Bipin, Prashant, and Mahesh. His father migrated from Morbi (Gujarat) to Bangalore in 1946 and worked at a private firm. Later, he quit the job and started a small business of trading semi-precious stones in Gujarat under the name of ‘Rajesh Diamond Company’.

== Career ==
He went to St. Joseph’s School and studied at National College for two years. He aspired to be a doctor but chose his father’s jewellery business instead. He and his brother Prashant took over the family business. He approached Bipin, the eldest brother, who worked at a bank, for a loan of Rs 1,200 and started a silver trading business. He bought jewellery from Chennai and sold it back at Rajkot to their relatives at a profit. He gradually started selling jewellery to retailers and wholesalers based in Gujarat.

They later started buying silver jewellery from Gujarat and sold it to retailers and wholesalers at Bangalore, Chennai, and Hyderabad. Through this way he popularized multiple ethnic Indian jewellery designs and cultures in different states of India. He formed an entity called ‘Rajesh Art Jewellers’ and started bartering goods. The company’s capital base increased by 50% with every barter cycle.

The silver jewellery business was successful, and Mehta moved into gold jewellery in 1989, setting up a 10-worker manufacturing unit in his garage at Bangalore. This company was named ‘Rajesh Exports’. It exported gold to United Kingdom, Dubai, Oman, Kuwait, the US, and Europe, and made a business of INR 20 million by the year 1992. The export business eventually grew to INR 1.2 billion by 1998. Mehta then opened a standalone retail store, which is now called ‘Shubh Jewellers’. There are 81 Shubh stores in Karnataka.

=== Rajesh Exports ===
Mehta founded Rajesh Exports in 1989 along with his brother Prashant Mehta. The company quickly rose into prominence with its first organized gold jewellery manufacturing facility in India. In 1991, they also established the country’s first research and development facility in the jewellery sector. Rajesh Exports processes 35% of the world’s gold. It is also listed in National Stock Exchange (NSE) and Bombay Stock Exchange (BSE). Rajesh Exports was included in the Fortune 500 list as the 423rd company.

In 2026, the company was accused of having committed a fraud of 15 lakh crore by Securities and Exchange Board of India (SEBI).

=== Valcambi Exports ===
In 2015 Rajesh Exports acquired Valcambi, the world’s largest gold refining facility, based in Switzerland. It can produce 400 tons of small sized gold bars and 500 tons of kilo bars every year. The gold bars produced are certified by the London Bullion Market Association (LBMA).

== Recognition ==
- Udhyog Shree Award
- Jeweller of the Year Award presented by the Karnataka Government
- Outstanding Businessman Award presented by Harun Business Institute of China
- Indian Affairs Transformational Business Leader of the Year 2018 by Satya Brahma founded India Leadership Conclave 2018.
- Indian Affairs Transformational Business Reformer of the Year 2021 by Satya Brahma founded India Leadership Conclave 2021.

== Personal life ==
Rajesh Mehta is the son of Chandrika Ben Mehta and is married to Leena Mehta.

His son Siddharth Mehta is the head of information technology team at Rajesh Exports Bangalore, which builds customised software for in-house processes.
