= Surendra Jain =

Indian politician

Surendra Kumar Jain
- सुरेंद्र कुमार जैन
- Born: 1954 (age 71–72); Rohtak, Punjab (modern-day Haryana)
- Citizenship: Indian
- Education: Graduate
- Alma mater: Delhi School of Economics SRCC
- Known for: National convener of Bajrang Dal
- Notable work: Role in Ram_Janmabhoomi Movement
- Title: 3rd President of Bajrang Dal
- Predecessor: Prakash Sharma
- Political party: Vishwa Hindu Parishad
- Website: Official blog

Surendra Kumar Jain is the international Joint General Secretary of Vishwa Hindu Parishad (VHP). He has retired from Principal, Hindu College Rohtak (Haryana) in India in 2013. He was the third president (national convener) of the Bajrang Dal after Vinay Katiyar and Jaibhan Singh Pawaiya. He was succeeded as president of Bajrang Dal by Prakash Sharma on 12 June 2002. He graduated from the Shri Ram College of commerce in New Delhi and obtained a post graduate degree from the Delhi School of Economics.
