= Rajesh Exports =

Gold retailer in India

Rajesh Exports Limited
- Type: Public
- Traded as: BSE: 531500; NSE: RAJESHEXPO
- ISIN: INE343B01030
- Industry: Jewellery; Precious metals Retail
- Founded: 1 February 1995
- Headquarters: Bangalore, India
- Key people: Rajesh Mehta (Executive Chairman)
- Products: Jewellery; Gold bullion Gold bars Medallions
- Services: Refining; Assaying
- Revenue: ▲₹778,716 crore (US$81 billion) (FY26)
- Operating income: ▼₹154 crore (US$16 million) (FY26)
- Net income: ▲₹113 crore (US$12 million) (FY26)
- Total assets: ▲₹30,728 crore (US$3.2 billion) (FY26)
- Total equity: ▲₹17,269 crore (US$1.8 billion) (FY26)
- Number of employees: 160 (permanent workforce, March 2025)
- Website: www.rajeshindia.com

Rajesh Exports Limited is an Indian multinational gold retailer headquartered in Bangalore, Karnataka. The company refines, designs, and sells gold and jewelry. It was ranked 7th on the Fortune India 500 list in 2020, with revenues of ₹2.90 trillion, and 462nd in the Fortune Global 500. The present managing director is Prashant Mehta and the executive chairman is Rajesh Mehta.

== History ==
The company was founded in 1989 as Rajesh Exports Limited by Rajesh Mehta and his brother Prashant Mehta both born in a middle class Jain family. The brothers started manufacturing in a ten-person shop located in their garage in Bangalore.

By 1990, the company opened a retail front and rapidly expanded.

In 2001, the company built a large manufacturing facility in Bangalore.

In 2011, the company raised $134.9 million by converting the foreign currency convertible bonds they had issued in 2007.

In 2015, the company acquired the largest gold refiner in the world, Valcambi of Balerna, Switzerland, for $400 million. As of 2018, they were planning to expand their Shubh Jewellers retail store.

In 2026, the company was accused of having committed a fraud of 15 lakh crore by Securities and Exchange Board of India (SEBI).

== See also ==
- List of companies of India
- List of largest companies by revenue
- List of corporations by market capitalization
- Make in India
- Forbes Global 2000
- Fortune India 500
