= Madhukar Parekh =

Indian [Billionaire] entrepreneur and chemical engineer

- Education: UDCT (B.Sc.); University of Wisconsin (M.S.)
- Occupation: Chairman Pidilite Industries
- Children: 2 daughters
- Father: Balvant Parekh

Madhukar Balvantray Parekh is an Indian entrepreneur, Chairman of Pidilite Industries, a global company among the leaders in adhesives and sealants, construction chemicals, and hobby colors. Madhukar is 16th richest Indian with a net worth of US$7.5 billion as of 2019.

In October 2024, Parekh and his family were ranked 17th on the Forbes list of India’s 100 richest tycoons, with a net worth of $14.6 billion.

== Early years ==
Parekh is the son of Balvant Parekh, born in a Gujarati Jain family who founded Pidilite Industries in 1959. Parekh secured rank 4 in IIT JEE examination yet remained to study at UDCT. Parekh completed Bachelor of Engineering in Chemical Engineering from the University Department of Chemical Technology of University of Mumbai and a Masters in Chemical engineering from University of Wisconsin the United States in 1969. He joined Abbot Laboratories USA after his master's degree.

Parekh joined his family business, Pidilite Industries, in 1971

== Awards & Recognitions ==
- Ranked 13 on Business Today Top 25 business leaders in India 2012
- Chemtech Business leader of the Year 2013
- EY Entrepreneur of the year - Consumer products 2014

== Associations ==
Parekh serves as the chairman and managing director of Vinyl Chemicals India Limited, an Independent non executive director of Excel Industries Limited. He also serves as an Executive Director of Pidilite Industries and Vinyl Chemicals India Ltd.
