= Harakh Chand Nahata =

Indian businessman (1936–1999)

Harakh Chand Nahata Shri Harakh Chand Nahata
- Born: 18 July 1936; Bikaner, Rajasthan, India
- Died: 21 February 1999 (aged 62); New Delhi, India
- Occupations: Commodities Trader; Film Financier; Real Estate Developer
- Spouse: Rukhmani Devi Nahata
- Children: 4 Sons

Harakh Chand Nahata (18 July 1936 – 21 February 1999) was a prominent Indian businessman, film financier and social leader.

== Early life ==
He was born in Bikaner, Rajasthan on 18 July 1936. His uncle, Agar Chand Nahata, and elder brother, Bhanwar Lal Nahata, were acknowledged authorities on Prakrit literature, Jain canonical literature and scriptures. The family has a private collection of more than 85,000 books, manuscripts, works of arts etc. at Abhay Jain Granthagar in Bikaner. His family has more than 175 years of business presence in the field of trading and distribution in Assam, Meghalaya, West Bengal, Calcutta, Tripura and the former East Bengal (now Bangladesh).

He completed his schooling at Bikaner and his college education in Calcutta.

He died on 21 February 1999 in New Delhi, after a brief illness.

== Business and trade ==
=== Tripura Town Out-Agency ===
Nahata was the first person to start road transportation in the difficult and inhabitable terrain of Tripura. Handling the largest Railway Out agency in Tripura (Tripura Town out Agency) and establishing a large network of road transport at heavy costs and risks, he was instrumental in starting economic development and two-way traffic to bring economic gains for the tribal people and the state of Tripura.

=== Technicians' studio ===
Nahata contributed a lot for the development of cinema in Eastern India through his Technicians Studio. Calcutta, with which many internationally acclaimed directors like Satyajit Ray, Hritwik Ghatak & Basu Bhattacharya etc. were associated. Later, he turned a film financier and realtor. He encouraged many upcoming artists of films and performing arts with his advice, help and patronage. He was a connoisseur of art and literature and secretly helped many budding artists, poets and writers. He spotted talents of writers and published many books at his own cost to encourage them including a Hindi monthly magazine.

For his multi-faceted contributions to trade and industry, Nahata was honoured with awards by the Vice President of India and Lieutenant-Governor of Delhi.

== Social contributions ==
He was a well-known social leader and philanthropist, associated with more than 60 socio-religious organizations and Trusts like Heart Care Foundation of India, Shanti Mandir-Bithari, Prakrit Bharati, Rishabhdev Foundation, Veerayatan, Rajasthan Bharati, Shri Ambika Niketan Trust, Ahimsa International, Shri Jain Mahasabha. Bharat Jain Mahamandal, Vishwa Jain Parishad and many others in different capacities. From (1990 onwards) he was the President of Akhil Bhartiya Shree Jain Shwetamber Khartargachha Mahasangh, the apex national representative body of thousands of Jains of this sect.

== Commemorations ==
RELEASE OF MEMORIAL BOOK 'PRANAM' IN NEW DELHI

A 625 page voluminous memorial book 'Pranam' was released at FICCI Auditorium, New Delhi on 21.02.2001, by Union Cabinet Minister, Shri Sunder Lal Patwa and Dr. Satya Narayan Jatia, Ex-Chief Minister of Delhi Dr. Sahib Singh Verma, Diplomat, Eminent Lawyer and Member of Parliament Dr. L.M. Singhvi, Famour Film Star and MP Shri Raj Babbar and many other dignitaries graced the momentous occasion.

Dara Singh inaugurating Harakh Chand Nahata Marg

HARAKH CHAND NAHATA MARG, NEW DELHI

On 1 March 2007, the wrestler, actor and member of the Rajya Sabha, Dara Singh, opened Harakh Chand Nahata Marg, a road that interconnects three villages of South-West Delhi, namely Nanakheri, Badusarai and Raghopur. Nahata's family is in the process of developing a Farmhouse Scheme in that area by the name of Westyn Park.

Hema Malini unveiling the bust of Shri Harakh Chand Nahata

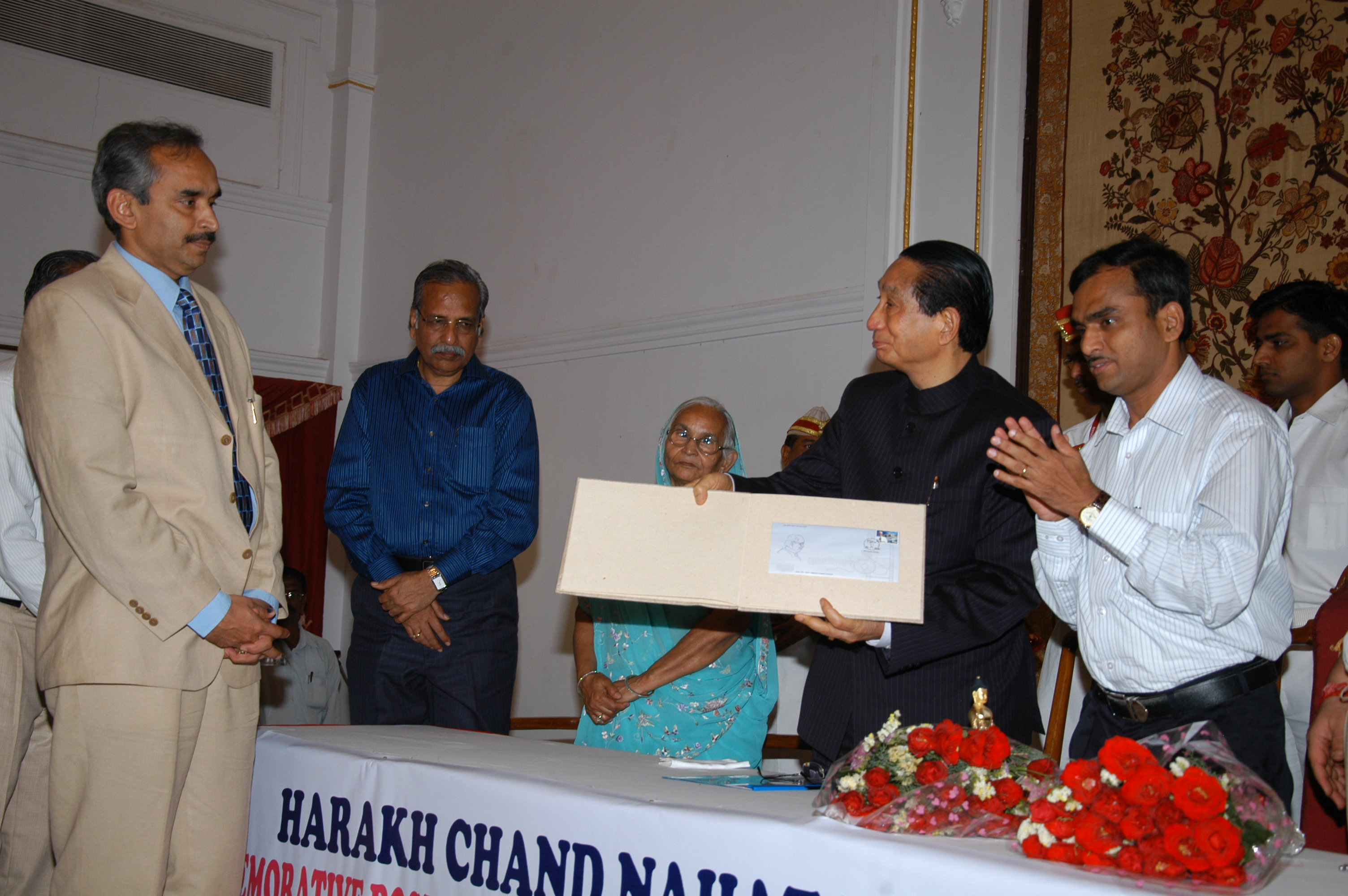
Hon. Governor Shri S. C. Jamir releasing the Stamp

BUST UNVEILING, BHATI, NEW DELHI

In a ceremony held on the occasion of Mahavir Jayanti on 31 March 2007, Hema Malini, an actor, dancer and member of the Rajya, unveiled a marble bust of Nahata at Mahabalipuram Teerth, Village Bhatti, New Delhi.

RELEASE OF COMMEMORATIVE POSTAGE STAMP BY THE DEPARTMENT OF POSTS, GOVERNMENT OF INDIA

A commemorative 5-rupee stamp was released by Shri S. C. Jamir, Governor of Maharashtra, on Shri Harakh Chand Nahata on 28 February 2009 in Mumbai to honor his selfless service to society and India.

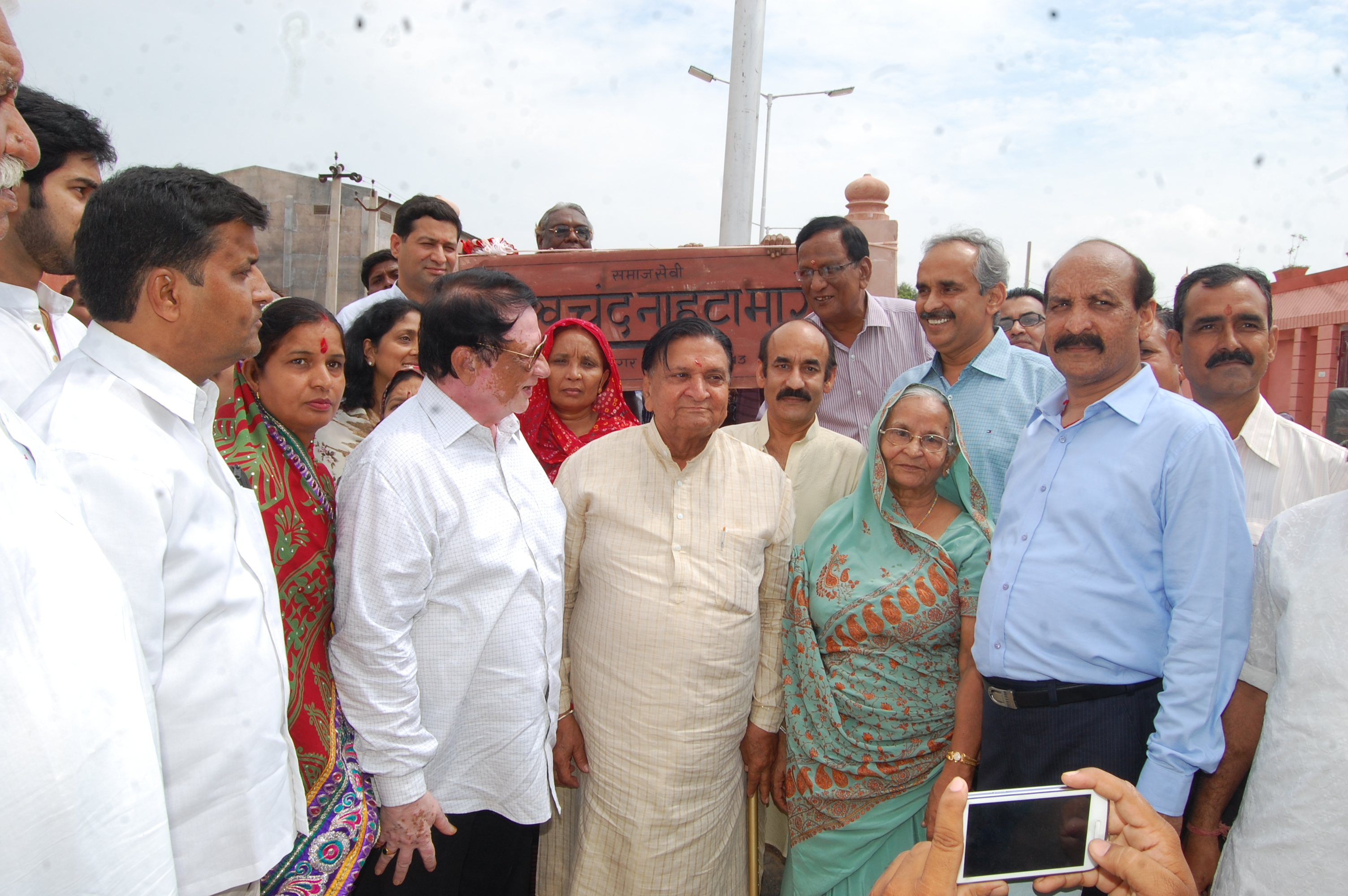
Harakh Chand Nahata Marg inauguration in Bikaner by Mayor Shri Bhawani Shankar Sharma

HARAKH CHAND NAHATA MARG, BIKANER, RAJASTHAN

On 28 September 2013, a 100 feet wide, 2 km prominent road connecting National Highway 89 to Rani Bazaar Industrial Area, Bikaner was named "Harakh Chand Nahata Marg" to honor him and his contributions. The inauguration was presided over by the Mayor of Bikaner Shri Bhawani Shankar Sharma in the presence of the Deputy Mayor Smt. Shakeela Banu, Shri Janardhan Kala, President City Congress Committee, Shri Chandra Prakash Gehlot, President Block Congree Bikaner, Shri Kanhaiya Lal Bothra. Also, in the picture is his wife Smt. Rukhmani Devi Nahata along with her sons.

BUST UNVEILING, BHADDILPUR, JHARKHAND

A marble bust of Nahata was unveiled at Shri Bhaddilpur Kalyanak Tirth (Jharkhand) by (Retd.) Justice Shri U.N. Bhachawat on 12 May 2012.

BUST UNVEILING, MITHILA, BIHAR

Shri Pramod Kumar, Minister of Art & Culture, Government of Bihar, integrated a marble bust of Nahata at Shri Mithila Kalyanak Tirth (Bihar) on 1 February 2020.

RELEASE OF COMMEMORATIVE PURE SILVER COIN, BIKANER, RAJASTHAN

A Commemorative Silver Coin of 99.9% purity and weighing 40 grams, was issued by the Ministry of Finance, Government of India and was released by His Excellency Shri Haribhau Bagade, Governor of Rajasthan on 2 February 2025 in Bikaner, Rajasthan. Hon'ble Union Minister of Culture Shri Gajendra Singh Shekhawat also graced this momentous occasion with his presence.

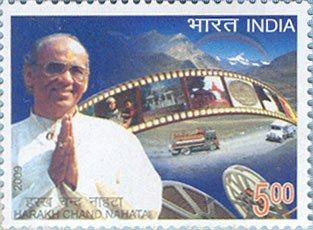
Harakh Chand Nahata Stamp of India - 2009
