= Sharmila Oswal =

- Born: Alibaug, Maharashtra, India
- Occupations: Social Worker; Philanthropist
- Known for: Green Energy Foundation, Jain International Trade Organisation
- Website: Sharmila Oswal

Sharmila Oswal is the founder and President of the non-governmental organization Green Energy Foundation (GEF), and the chairperson of Jain International Trade Organisation (JITO) women's wing.

== Career ==
In 2009, the NGO Green Energy Foundation (GEF) led a program in Pune to work with communities and institutions to save energy through more effective waste management. Oswal explained how the program would focus on education to help people help themselves, including for women and children, and would include composting and organic vegetable gardening.

In 2010, GEF and UNESCO launched an education program 'Ecovarsity' about environmental issues, that Oswal explained would work with universities to offer workshops, certificate courses, and distance-learning degree courses, as well as vocational courses and research programs.

In 2010, GEF submitted a report it prepared, titled, "Harvesting rain water to meet the water shortage in Pune," to Pune Mayor Mohansingh Rajpal. Oswal explained the study took six months to complete, and advocated for the government to create a rain harvesting cell and surveillance committee to help avert a crisis.

In 2011, GEF announced a project to build public toilets, and Oswal explained, "The effect of unavailability of public toilets for women is severely limiting the mobility of this gender and their ability to work efficiently," and that GEF would focus its efforts on the most vulnerable population.

In 2012, GEF launched the Arunodaya Project to distribute solar lamps to families, to replace candles and kerosene lamps. Oswal noted the disparities between areas busy with construction and the villages that were the focus of the NGO's efforts.

In 2016, GEF worked with the Union ministry of drinking water and sanitation to implement a model of rainwater harvesting and a simple potable water filter developed by the NGO. Oswal explained how the model had traveled from Pune to Marathwada and received a good response from residents, and how the goal was to encourage rainwater harvesting before the monsoon season to avoid a crisis. Owsal's outreach for the project included her participation as an expert in the Massachusetts Institute of Technology's 2017 Water Diplomacy Workshop.

In 2017, Jain International Trade Organisation (JITO), a business and professional association, launched a project to train volunteers to encourage digital currency transactions instead of cash. Oswal advocated for digital transactions to reduce corruption. In 2017, JITO also launched the 'Jito Women Digital Warriors' program, led by Oswal, to train women about digital currency transactions, which Oswal advocated "to promote digital economy through every home, market, community and the country." Oswal also launched a Facebook page to promote the campaign and said the response to the campaign was encouraging, including from PM Modi.

== Honors and awards ==
- Rotary International Woman of the Year in 2007

== Personal life ==
Oswal's family has a business that manufactures wastewater recycling systems.
