= Mool Chand Jain =

Indian politician

Babu Mool Chand Jain
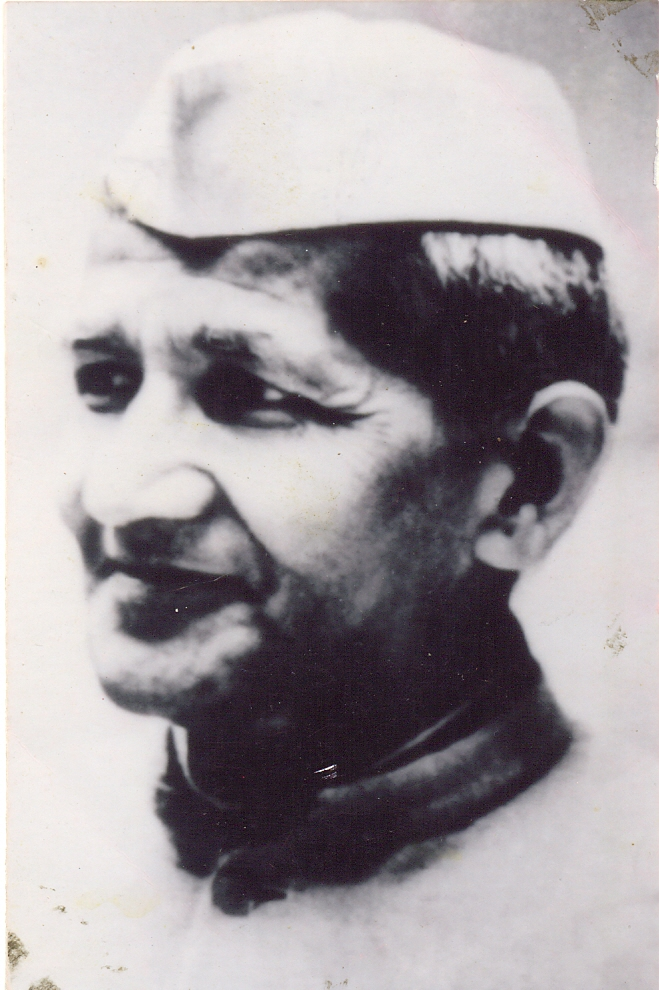
- Babu Mool Chand Jain (1915–1997)
- Born: 20 August 1915; SikanderPur Majra, Gohana, Sonepat
- Died: 12 September 1997 (aged 82); Karnal

Babu Mool Chand Jain (20 August 1915 – 12 September 1997), often referred to as "Gandhi of Haryana", - a Gandhian who was a member of the Congress Party, Vishal Haryana Party, Janata Party, Lok Dal and then Haryana Vikas Party at different times. He was a freedom fighter in the Indian independence movement, parliamentarian, lawyer, Satyagrahi social activist, and Indian statesman who also served as Excise & Taxation and Public Works Department Minister in Joint Punjab as well as Finance Minister, Deputy Chairman (Planning Board).

== Early life (1915–1937) ==
Babu Mool Chand Jain was born on 20 August 1915 in a village called Sikanderpur Majra in the city of Gohana in District Sonepat. He topped his village primary school (which is now named after him), 10th Grade (Gohana) and F.Sc (Rohtak) in Haryana. He received his bachelor's degree in 1935 from S.D. College Lahore (now in Pakistan).

== Gandhian Civil Disobedience (1938–1947) ==
In 1937, he started his law practice in Gohana. In 1939, he was seriously injured and assumed dead at village Asaudha in Rohtak when hundreds of volunteers of freedom movement were attacked by the followers of Zamindara League who were armed with local metallic weapons including bhallas, barchhas and gandasas. He participated in the Individual Civil Disobedience Movement in 1941.

He started law practice in Karnal but continued active participation in the freedom movement. He was elected General Secretary of District Congress.

== Post Indian Independence (1948–1965) ==
=== Early Service and Bhoodan Movement ===
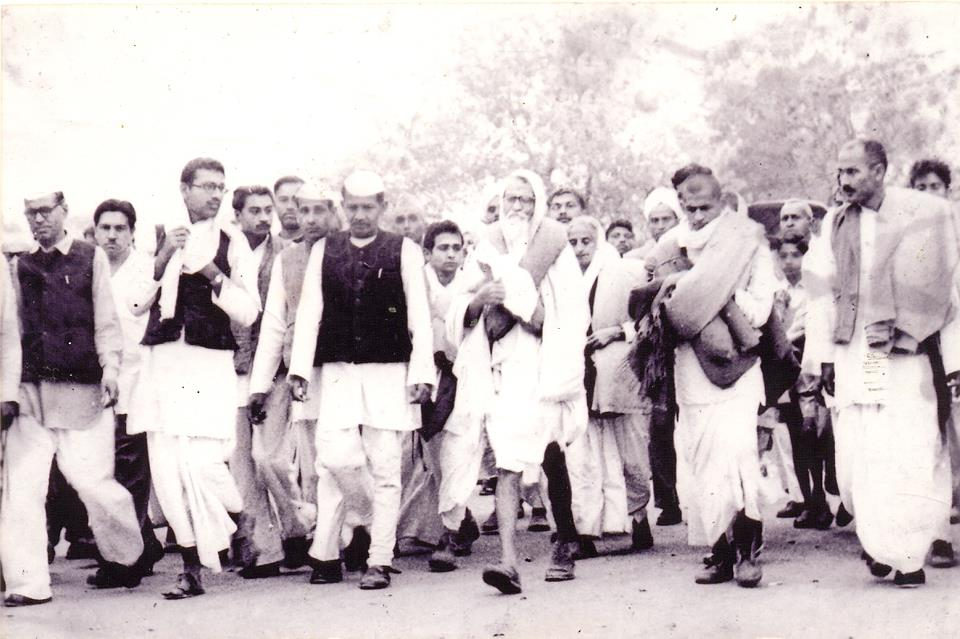
Jain (in center wearing white cap) with Vinoba Bhave

After independence, he was first elected General Secretary and later President of the District Indian National Congress Committee Karnal. He was also General Secretary of the Kasturba Gandhi National Memorial Fund Committee and the Gandhi National Memorial Fund Committee in 1947-49. He edited a weekly newspaper ‘Balidaan’ during the year 1947-52 while he led old tenant's movement in Karnal. This agitation succeeded and Punjab Government had to issue instructions to restore the lands to those old tenants who had been uprooted earlier. Before being inducted in Cairon ministry, Babuji was engaged in Bhoodan Movement of Vinoba Bhave in entire Panjab and donated one sixth of his income as "Sampatti Daan" for several years.

=== Punjab Cabinet Minister ===
In 1952, he was elected to the Punjab Legislative Assembly from Samalkha and took active part in the proceedings of the Assembly. In March 1956, he was included in the Cabinet of Partap Singh Kairon State Government as Excise & Taxation and Public Works Department (PWD) Minister.

=== Member of Parliament (Lok Sabha) (1957–1962) ===
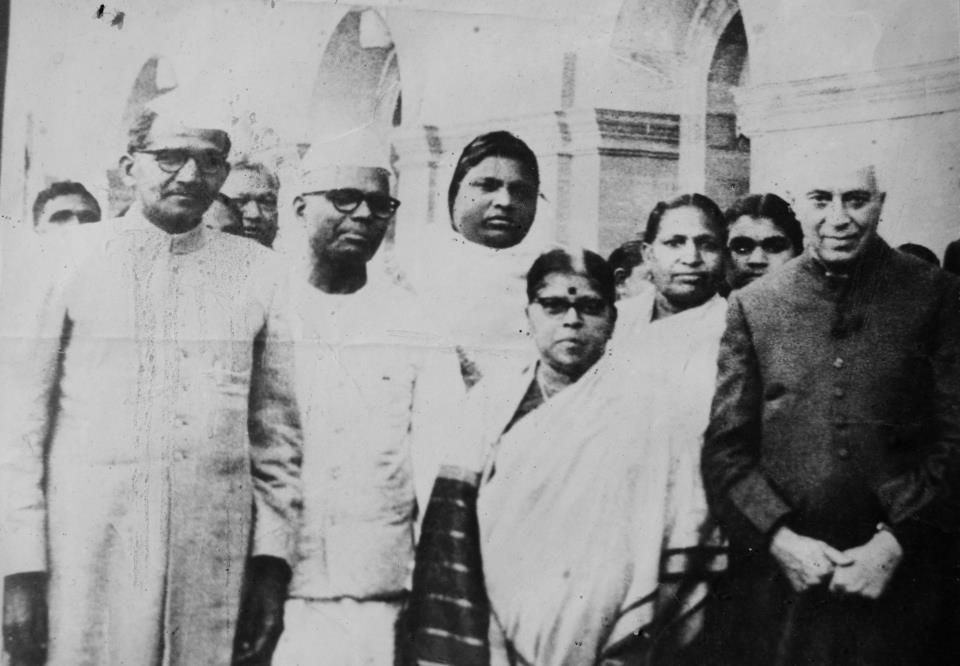
Jain (on extreme left) with Prime Minister Jawahar Lal Nehru

In 1957 he was elected Member of Indian Parliament from Kaithal (Lok Sabha Constituency). He spent only Rs. 4000/- on his election campaign. As MP, he soon came in the good books of Nehruji and was made member of several important committees appointed by the Union Government such as Direct Taxes Advisory Committee, Small Scale Industries Board and Cooperative Farming Board etc. He was also convener of Finance Standing Committee along with Sh. Morarji Desai, the then Finance Minister of India. After the formation of Panchayati Raj Committees in Rajasthan & Andhra Pradesh, Babuji was made one of the member of five member committee constituted by Nehruji, to look after the affairs of Panchyati Raj Committees in these States. This committee submitted its report to the Prime Minister after visiting Rajasthan, Andhra Pradesh and Gujrat. In 1962, he fought Sardar Pratap Singh Kairon for his involvement in the murderous attack on Ram Pyara, MLA of Punjab (see his letters).

== Contributions to Haryana ==
=== Creation of the state and early growth (1965–1968) ===
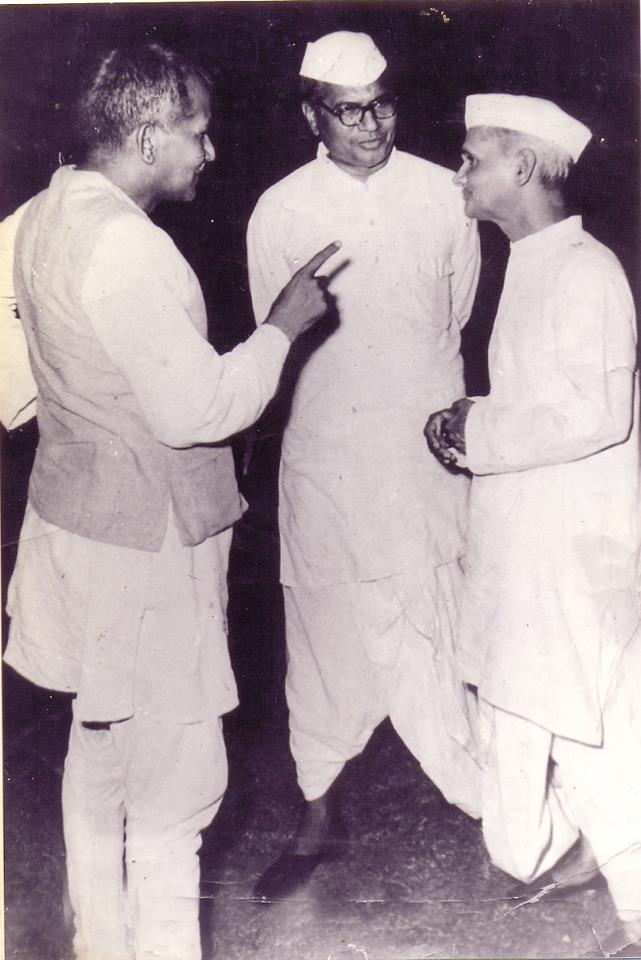
Jain (on left) with Prime Minister Lal Bahadur Shashtri (on right) and Balwant Rai Tayal, 1964

During 1965-67, Babuji actively directed the campaign for creation of a separate Haryana State. He was the General Secretary of All Party Haryana Action Committee which was presided by Ch. Devi Lal. After the creation of Haryana in 1966, he was elected to the state assembly from Gharaunda on Congress Party ticket. He went on to become Finance Minister in the cabinet of Rao Birender Singh. He contested 1968 election on the VHP ticket from Indri assembly constituency and lost his security deposit.

=== Political and Moral Leadership in Haryana (1977–1989) ===
After his release from jail during [the Emergency], he left the Vishal Haryana Party and joined the Janata Party. He was elected to the Haryana Assembly on Janata Party ticket from Samalkha in June 1977 and served as Finance Minister in the cabinet of Ch. Devi Lal starting in December 1978.

Babuji then joined the Lok Dal and became the Vice President of Haryana Pradesh Lok Dal. In 1985-87, he played a major role in the Nyayay Yudh Movement launched by Ch. Devi Lal against clause 7 & 9 of the Rajiv-Longowal Punjab Accord. He was a member of the executive committee of Haryana Sangharsh Samiti and was imprisoned several times during that agitation. After the formation of the Govt. of Ch. Devi Lal, Babuji's service to Haryana was recognized and he was appointed Deputy Chairman of the State Planning Board, Haryana. He was also appointed Chairman of Morni Hills Area Development Committee, Chairman of high powered committee in generating moral education in the educational institutions of the state, Chairman of the Jail Reforms Committee, Pay Anomalies Committee and the HAFED Affairs Committee. He was also appointed member of the High Level Public Undertaking Committee and Agroha Development Board.

He resigned from the post of Deputy Chairman Planning Board in July 1989 on account of his difference of opinion with the then Chief Minister, Ch. Devi Lal on various issues including Sh. Om Prakash Chautala's interference and his role in Meham constituency of Rohtak district in Haryana against Mr. Dangi. After his resignation, Babuji participated actively in the fight against Mr. Chautala.

== Imprisonment during Indian Emergency (1975) ==
Babuji took active part in the movement launched by Sh. Jayaprakash Narayan during the year 1973-75. He was the convener of Karnal District's Sampoorna Kranti Abhiyaan. After the proclamation of emergency in June 1975, he was arrested immediately and was detained for more than 19 months in multiple far-off jails of Haryana.

== Public Service and Rural Library Movement (1990–1997) ==
In 1990, Diamond Jubilee of Babuji was celebrated at a huge public gathering in Karnal where an Abhinandan Granth was presented to him by the People of Haryana as a token of love and regard in recognition of his services to the state.

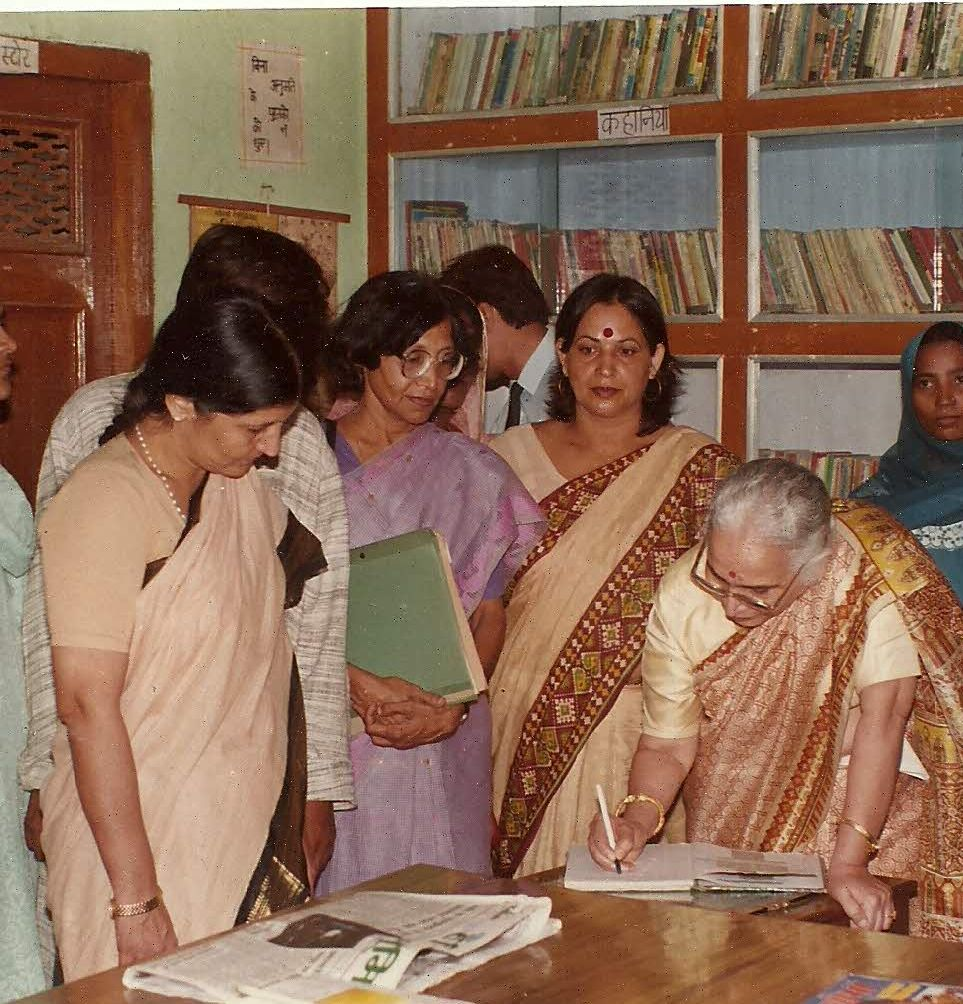
Visitors signing at the village library established by Babuji, 1998

Babuji was deeply concerned with improving the education system of the nation. He considered moral education and Library Movement as the most important factors necessary to transform the education system. In 1991, he established a library and a reading room in his native village, Sikanderpur Majra in Gohana (Sonepat). This library is regarded as the best library in rural Haryana. The residents of this village celebrate the birthday of Babuji as ‘Library Day’ every year

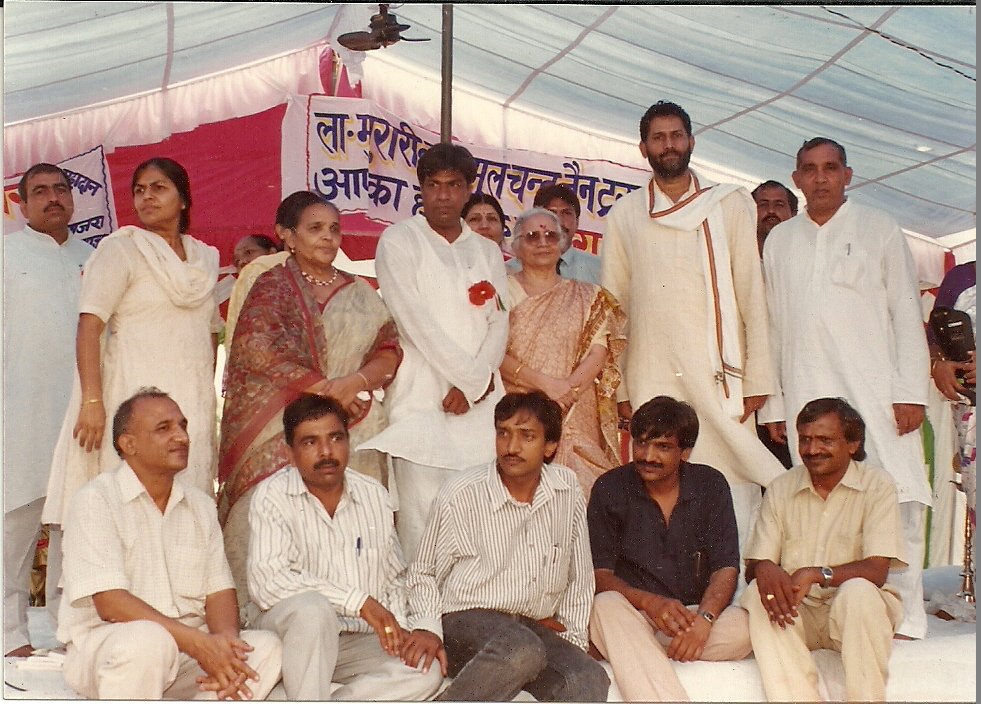
Smt Suman Krishna Kant with Babuji's Family Members, 1998

Babuji worked for the Sarva Sewa Sangh and was a special invitee to its executive meetings until the end of his life. He was the founder Trustee and an active member of the Governing Body of Maharaja Agrasen Medical and Research Institution. Babuji was also a life-member of the executive committee of Dayanand Centenary Dental College Yamunanagar; Chairman of North India Freedom Fighter Association and Chairman of State Azadi Bachaoo Andolon Samiti Haryana till his death. During 1991-1994 he arranged a series of lectures of late Rajeev Dixit (who was convener of Swabhiman Manch by Swami Ram Dev in Patanjali Yog Ashram, Haridwar) throughout Haryana to make the people aware of the adverse effects of multinational corporations.

It was due to the secularist aspect of his personality that he was made a member of the Governing body of Guru Gobind Singh Foundation, Chandigarh.

== International engagements ==
Babuji was the president of Haryana Indo-Soviet Cultural Friendship Society. He held this office until his death. He visited Soviet Union twice in the year 1972 and 1980. He also visited Afghanistan and Bulgaria.

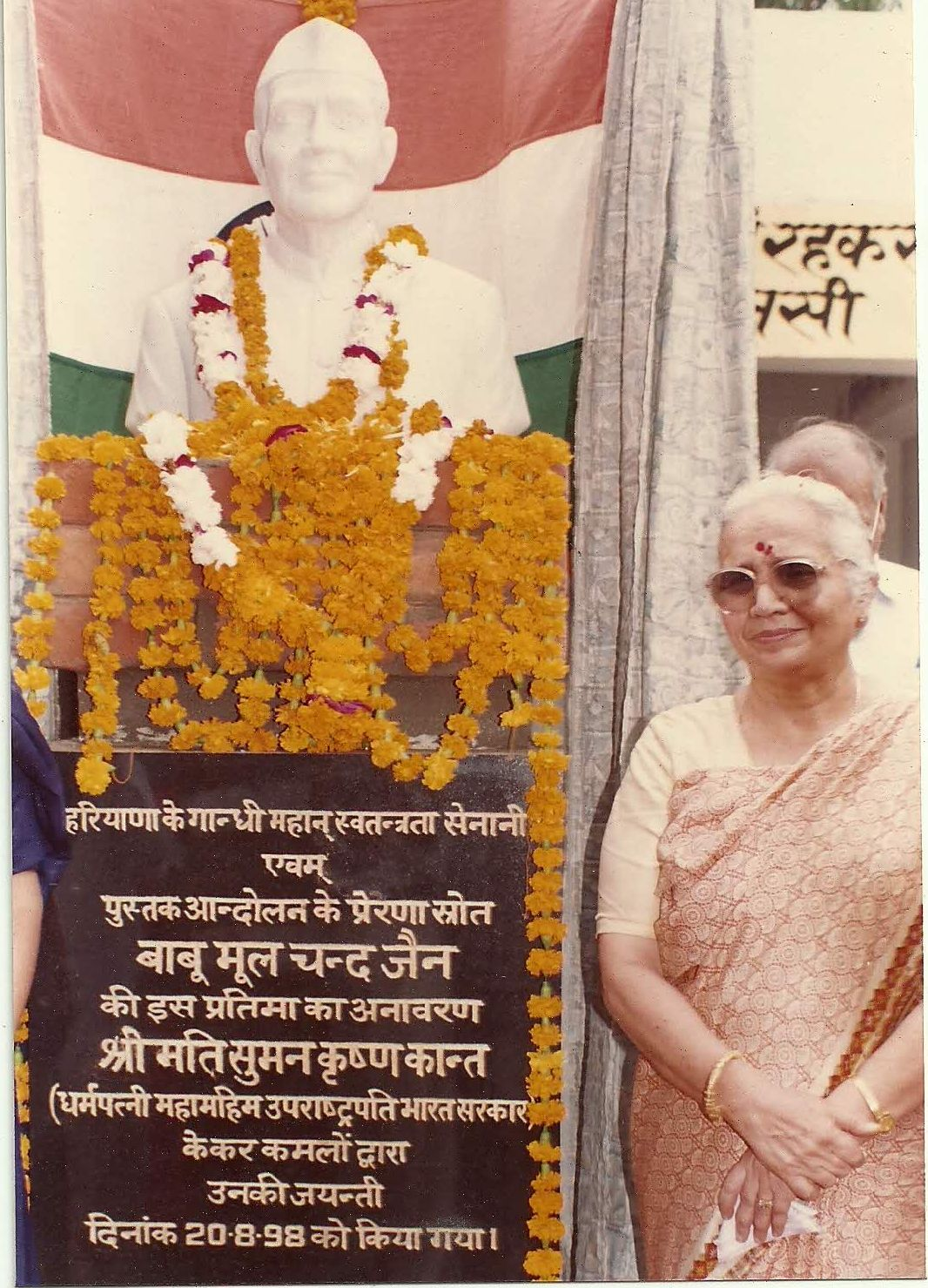
Smt. Suman Krishan Kant unveiling statue of Babuji on 20 August 1998 after his death

In November 1996, Babuji visited the U.S.A. as a member of Guru Gobind Singh Foundation (Chandigarh), to celebrate the 300th anniversary of Khalsa Panth and to celebrate 1999 as the year of ‘Human Spirit’. While in USA, he studied deeply the constitutions of USA, France and other countries in a quest to search for the solutions to Indian problems of corruption, criminalization of politics and instability of central and state governments. He reached the conclusion that India's salvation lies in adopting Presidential form of government instead of parliamentary form of Government. Prime Minister Sh. Atal Bihari Vajpayee had already started a debate on parliamentary vs. presidential form of Government through media while he was leader of the opposition for the Central Government. Babuji genuinely re-activated this discussion through his engagements with Bar councils and meetings with media representatives.

== Last years (1996–1997) ==
In 1996, on account of his high stature and sacrifices for the nation, Babuji was made member of the State Level Committee to commemorate the 50th Anniversary of Independence and the state level committee to celebrate the birth centenary of Netaji Subhash Chand Bose by the state Govt. headed by Ch. Bansi Lal. On 14 August 1997, about a month before his death Babu ji joined Haryana Vikas Party. Ch. Bansi Lal (Chief minister of Haryana), visited his native village Sikanderpur Majra (Sonepat) as chief guest to bless him on his 82nd birthday and laid a commemorative stone on the wall of village Chaupal from where Babuji had courted arrest on 6 March 1941 during Satyagraha.

On 12 September 1997 Babuji died at his residence in Karnal. The birth Centenary of Babu Mool Chand Jain was celebrated on 23 August 2015 at NDRI Karnal. The Governor of Haryana, Sh Kaptan Singh Solanki was the Chief Guest. The Govt. of Haryana honoured the late freedom fighter by renaming the ITI Karnal to Babu Mool Chand Jain ITI Karnal. He was once a Member of Parliament (Lok Sabha) and three times MLA. He is survived by four daughters and three sons.
