= Yashpal Jain =

Indian writer (1912–2000)

- Born: 1 September 1912; Vijaygarh, Aligarh district, United Provinces of Agra and Oudh, British India
- Died: 10 October 2003 (Age 88); Nagda, Madhya Pradesh, India
- Occupation: Writer
- Awards: Padma Shri

Yashpal Jain (1912 - 2000) was an Indian writer.

== Early life ==
He was born on 1 September 1912 at Vijaygarh, in Aligarh district, United Provinces of Agra and Oudh, British India. He published many books, including children's books. Ajanta Ellora, Ahimsa, the Infallible Weapon and Pilgrimages of India are some of his notable works. The Government of India awarded him the fourth highest civilian award of Padma Shri in 1990.

He died on 10 October 2003.
