= Tarang Jain =

Indian billionaire businessman

- Born: 1962 or 1963 (age 62–63); Aurangabad, Maharashtra, India
- Education: Bombay University; International Institute for Management Development
- Occupation: Businessman
- Known for: 86% owner of Varroc
- Title: Managing director (CEO), Varroc
- Spouse: Married
- Children: 2
- Relatives: Rahul Bajaj (uncle)

Tarang Jain (born 1962/1963) is an Indian billionaire businessman, the CEO and 86% owner of Varroc, an Indian two- and four-wheeler parts manufacturer.

As of October 9, 2024, Anurang Jain and his family were ranked 88th on Forbes' list of India's 100 richest individuals, with a net worth of US$3.65 billion.

== Early life and education ==
His mother Suman is the sister of Rahul Bajaj. His father is Naresh Chandra Jain, who founded Varroc, and he has an identical twin brother Anurang Jain, who runs another car components company, Endurance Technologies.

Jain earned a bachelor's degree from University of Mumbai, and an MBA from IMD Business School in Lausanne, Switzerland.

== Career ==
Jain founded Varroc in 1990.

In 2012, he bought Visteon's global lighting interests, the world’s sixth-largest lighting business, for $90.5 million.

== Personal life ==
Jain is married, with two children, and lives in Aurangabad, India.
