= Valcambi =

Swiss refinery

- Formerly: Valori & Cambi
- Company type: S.A. (corporation)
- Industry: Refining
- Founded: Balerna, Ticino, Switzerland (May 15, 1961; 65 years ago)
- Headquarters: Balerna, Switzerland
- Area served: Worldwide
- Key people: Federico Domenghini (Chairman); Michael Mesaric (CEO)
- Products: Precious metals
- Number of employees: 155
- Parent: Rajesh Exports
- Website: www.valcambi.com

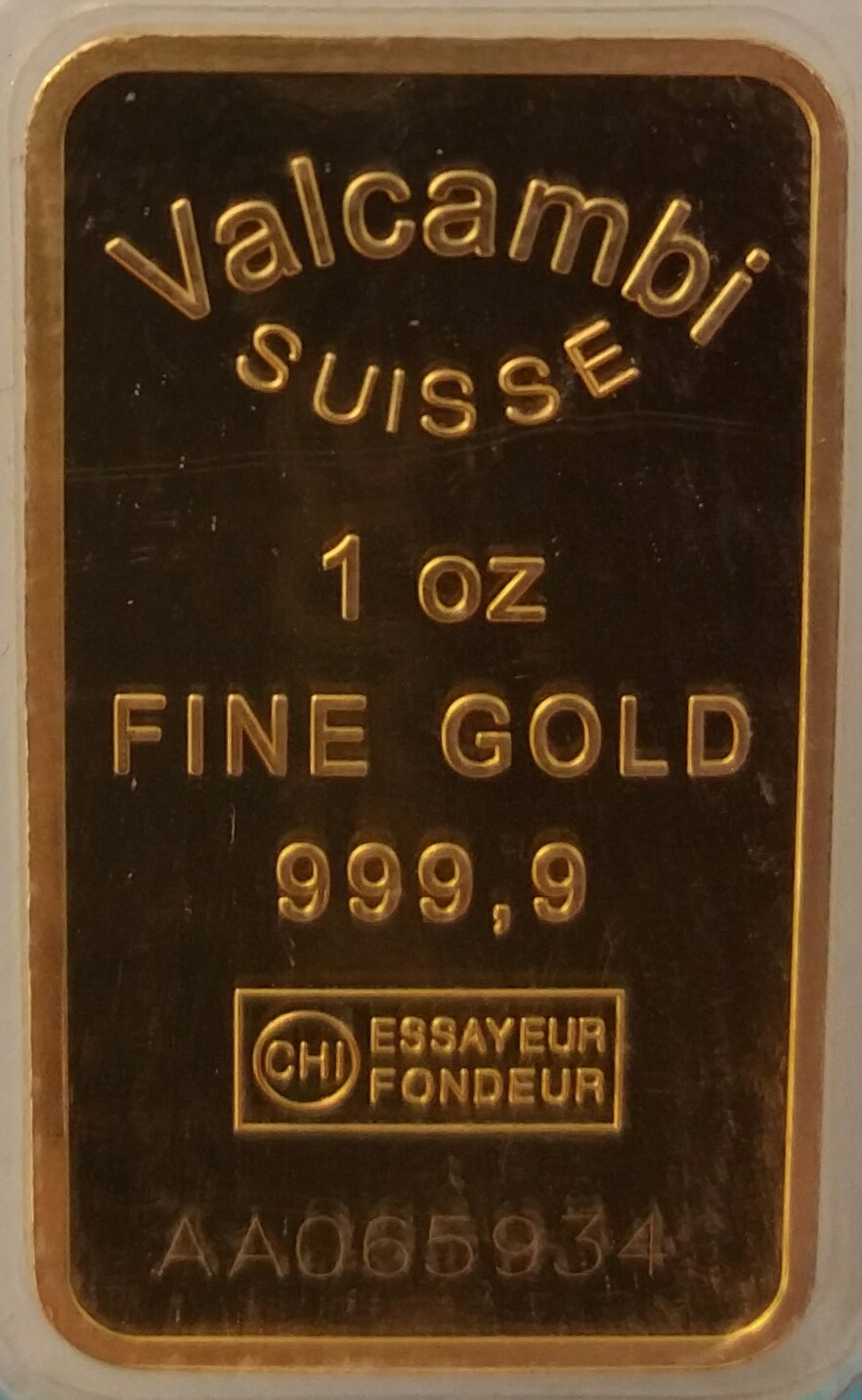
An example of a Valcambi minted gold bar.

Valcambi is a precious metals refining company located in Balerna, Switzerland, and a subsidiary of Rajesh Exports Limited. Valcambi is owned by European Gold Refineries, which is owned by Global Gold Refineries AG, which in turn is 95% owned by REL Singapore PTE Ltd. and 5% by Rajesh Exports Limited India. Valcambi is thus 100% controlled by Rajesh Exports, the parent company of REL Singapore.

They refine gold, silver, platinum and palladium into various forms including cast and minted bars, rounds, coins, and other semi-finished casting products. It is among the world's largest precious metals refiners and refines more gold than any other. Additionally, the company provides precious metals assay, transportation, and storage services.

== History ==
The company was formed on May 15, 1961, as Valori & Cambi by a group of five Swiss businessmen/entrepreneurs from Mendrisio. The name was changed to Valcambi on June 30, 1967. In 1967, Credit Suisse bought 50% of the Valcambi refinery, followed by the purchase of another 30% stake in 1968. The remaining 20% was purchased in 1980, giving Credit Suisse 100% control of the firm.

In 2003, European Gold Refineries SA purchased 100% of Valcambi from Credit Suisse for approximately $400 million.

In 2015, Rajesh Exports Limited, a Bengaluru-based jeweller, acquired Valcambi for $400 million in an all-cash deal. The company bought out the stakes of US miner Newmont Mining Corporation and a group of global investors to own 100% equity in Valcambi.

On 10 September 2015, a Bern Declaration report, "A Golden Racket," revealed that Valcambi had purchased gold traced to artisanal mines in Burkina Faso. It claimed that Valcambi had imported seven tonnes of gold in 2014 that were smuggled into Togo and sold to Wafex Sàrl, a subsidiary of the Ammar Group. A Geneva-based company, MM Multitrade, then imported it into Switzerland and sold it to Valcambi. In response to the report, Valcambi denied receiving any gold from mines mentioned by Berne Declaration and emphasized its conforming to procedures when procuring gold in a press release dated 12 September 2015.

On 27 October 2023, Valcambi resigned from its 40-year membership with the Swiss Association of Precious Metal Manufacturers and Traders (ASFCMP), citing "irreconcilable differences" with some members of the ASFCMP's board regarding excluding certain countries as suppliers for its gold.
