= Jagdish Chandra Jain =

Indian schiolar and writer (1909-1994)

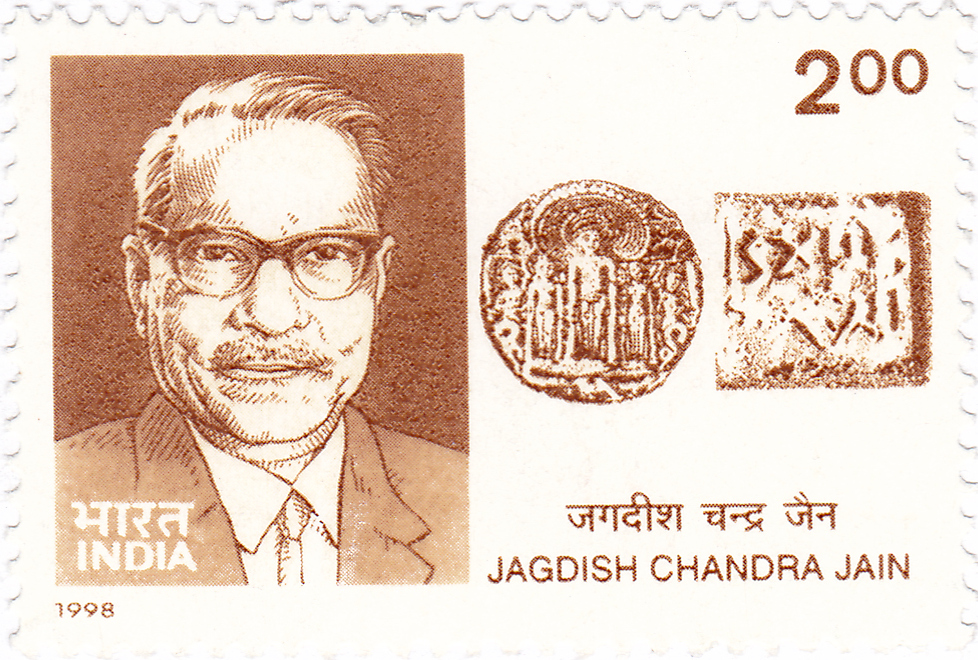
- Jagdish Chandra Jain on a 1998 stamp of India
- Born: 20 January 1909; Basera, Uttar Pradesh, India
- Died: 28 July 1994 (aged 85); Mumbai, India
- Education: Gurukula, Banaras Hindu University and Shantiniketan under Rabindranath Tagore
- Known for: Writer, professor, thinker, and freedom fighter during the Indian independence movement

Jagdish Chandra Jain (20 January 1909 – 28 July 1993) was a scholar, indologist, educationist, writer, and freedom fighter during the freedom struggle of India. He authored over 80 books on a variety of subjects, including Jain philosophy, Prakrit literature, and Hindi textbooks for children. Jain was the chief prosecution witness in Gandhi's murder trial. He repeatedly tried to warn the government of the conspiracy to assassinate Mahatma Gandhi, which became to known to him after Madan Lal Pahwa, a Punjabi refugee and one of the conspirators of the murder of Mahatma Gandhi, confided to him of their plan. Jain's attempts to warn the government met deaf ears. He recounted his personal experiences in two books: I Could Not Save Bapu and The Forgotten Mahatma. He died from cardiac arrest in July 1993 in Bombay at the age of 84.

== Early childhood ==
Jagdish Chandra Jain was born in 1909 in a village called Basera situated in the Doab region of western Uttar Pradesh, about 12 miles from Muzaffarnagar. He belonged to an educated Jain family. His father, Sri Kanjimal Jain, owned a small shop selling the traditional Unani medicine. Jagdish Chandra was the youngest of the two brothers. His one brother and sister died at a young age.

In 1911, when Jagdish Chandra was two-and-a-half years old, disaster struck when his father died, a victim of the plague, leaving his mother as sole care-taker of the two boys. After a few stormy years, his elder brother, Gulshanrai, who lost one of his eyes due to smallpox, began to look after the family. At the age of six, Jagdish Chandra was sent to the village Pathashala (school), where he attended primary school. It was a very small school where Muslim students also read. At the age of nine, he completed his studies in Pathashala, after which his elder brother admitted him to a gurukula. The rigorous discipline of the ashram life left a tangible impact on his subsequent life.

== College years – sprouting the seed ==
In 1923, Jagdish Chandra went to Varanasi and got himself admitted to Syadvad Jain Mahahvidyalay (located on the banks of the Ganges), where he studied Sanskrit, Jain religion, vyakaran (grammar), sahitya (literature) and nyaya (logic). It was here, through his own experience that he realised the eminence of India's cultural heritage. He received the Sastri degree. In the later years he also studied Ayurveda (traditional science of Indian medicine).

He continued his studies at Banaras Hindu University and obtained his B.A. degree followed by an M.A. in Philosophy in 1932.

In 1929, he married Kamalshri. Though born in a prosperous family of Tissa in Uttar Pradesh, she willingly gave up her luxurious life-style and moulded her own aspirations to support her husband. Indeed, when Jagdish Chandra was later detained during India's freedom struggle, Kamalshri suffered immensely being alone with her small children—an irony that mimicked Jagdish Chandra's own childhood.

Jagdish Chandra's college life was neither smooth nor peaceful. He was in fact then a street boy struggling hard for his daily bread. The precarious existence, the agony of somehow passing the day, and of somehow managing to survive, naturally created in him a revolutionary spirit. After a few years, Jagdish Chandra received a scholarship to work as a research scholar in Shantiniketan (abode of peace) in West Bengal, which was the ashram of Rabindranath Tagore. The experience of personal contact with Rabindranath Tagore contributed to his spiritual development and creative spirit.

This was the turning point in Jagdish Chandra's life. He felt that British rule in India was the root cause of all evil, and naturally created in him an urge to change society. When Mahatma Gandhi launched the Satyagraha movement in 1930, Jagdish Chandra left his studies and joined the movement. He left Varanasi and went back to his village in Basera to organise the people. He called for volunteers for the civil disobedience movement and delivered fiery speeches. His enthusiasm was keenly observed and very soon an arrest warrant was issued against him. Fortunately, under the cover of darkness he was able to escape.

Jagdish Chandra left his village and went to Ajmer, where he was employed as a school teacher. But his Gandhi cap came in the way. The headmaster objected to the use of the cap; his argument was that since Ajmer was a state of British India he could not be permitted to wear it. Committed to a principle as he was, Jagdish Chandra quit his job. Settling into an academic career was never easy for young Jagdish Chandra; his manifold skills and intensity of social commitment never stopped pulling him in different directions.

In 1934, he taught European students Hindi at St. Mary's European High School. While teaching there, he felt the need for good text books in Hindi. He proceeded to prepare a set of Hindi text books that were later prescribed by the education department of the government of Maharashtra for secondary schools. He then joined Ramnarain Ruia College as a professor of Sanskrit and soon headed the Hindi department. By then, he was a qualified PhD advisor in Hindi while he himself did his doctorate in sociology. But the permanent post of a professor and the prospect of a peaceful scholarly life did not satisfy him. Jagdish Chandra felt that he could not remain indifferent to the socio-political changes which were taking place. India was passing through a critical period—there was unrest and repression all over the country; World War II had begun; Mahatma Gandhi was leading the rigorous Quit India Movement; and Netaji Subhash Chandra Bose had escaped from his house detention and reached Berlin from where he was broadcasting for his countrymen. As a result, Jagdish Chandra rejoined the freedom movement and soon after was arrested and detained in the Worli Detention camp in September 1942. During his prison years his political views further sharpened.

== Assassination of Mahatma Gandhi ==
The assassination of Mahatma Gandhi on 30 January 1948 was a memorable event in Jain's life. Jagdish Chandra gave advance information to the Bombay Government – the Chief Minister B.G. Kher and the Home Minister Morarji Desai – that a conspiracy was going on to kill the Mahatma. The fact was that Madanlal Pahwa, a Punjabi refugee and one of the conspirators of the murder of Mahatma Gandhi, was known to him. The man was grateful to Prof. Jain because the latter had helped him secure occupation. Once in a weak moment, Madanlal told Prof. Jain that they were planning to assassinate the Mahatma. At once, Prof. Jain informed the Chief Minister and the Home Minister of Bombay of this conspiracy and suggested that proper security measures be taken. However, the government did not take up the matter seriously and Morarji Desai, who was then the Home Minister of Bombay, rudely shouted saying, “In that case, you are the conspirator and I will arrest you.” On 20 January 1948 Madanlal blasted a bomb during the prayer meeting of Mahatma Gandhi at the Birla House, Delhi. The attempt failed and Madanlal was arrested. Prof. Jain repeatedly urged the government to give him a chance to interrogate Madanlal since he was confident that he would be able to persuade Madanlal to give up the names of the other conspirators and disclose the nature of the conspiracy. But the government remained stout and the assassination of Mahatma took place ten days later. Subsequently, Jain appeared in the Gandhi murder trial at the Red Fort in Delhi as the chief prosecution witness on behalf of the government of India. He exposed the callousness of the government in this regard in two of his books: I Could Not Save Bapu and The Forgotten Mahatma

== Government issued stamp ==
In July 1993, Jain died from cardiac arrest in Bombay (Mumbai). To pay tribute, the government of India released a commemorative postal stamp in his memory. The Bombay Municipal Corporation (BMC) also named the street of his residence after his name.

== Books authored ==
Jain wrote over 80 books on a variety of subjects, including Jainism, Prakrit literature. Some of his books have been used in various Indian universities. He has also contributed numerous research articles in Hindi and English magazines and journals.

- Jambusvāmicarita in Sanskrit, edited from manuscript. 1936.
- Shrīmad Rājacandra. 1937. (Revised edition: Shrimad Rājachandra Bhaktaratna, 1967).
- Mahāvīra Vardhamāna. 1945, 68 pp.
- Life in Ancient India as Depicted in the Jain Canons, with Commentaries; an administrative, economic, social, and geographical survey of ancient India based on the Jain canons. 1947, 420 pp.
- The Forgotten Mahatma. 1987. Jain's account as a prosecution witness of the assassination of Mahatma Gandhi by Nathuram Vinayak Godse, and the trial; includes his views on Gandhi's role in India's independence, and the relevance of his philosophy today.
- I Could Not Save Bapu. 1949, 241 pp.
- Amidst the Chinese people. 1955, 152 pp.
- The Murder of Mahatma Gandhi: prelude and aftermath. 1961, 175 pp.
- Do hazāra varsha purānī kahāniyām̐. 1965, 188 pp.
- Prācīna Bhārata kī śreshṭha kahāniyām̐. 1970, 140 pp.
- Prākr̥ta Jaina kathā sāhitya. 1971, 196 pp.
- The Gift of Love and other Ancient Indian Tales about Women. 1976, 99 pp.
- Prakrit Narrative Literature: origin and growth. 1981, 240 pp.
- Women in Ancient Indian Tales. 1981, 110 pp.
- Life in Ancient India as Depicted in Jaina Canon and Commentaries (6th Century B.C. to 17th Century A.D.) . 1984, 531 pp.
- Prākr̥ta sāhitya kā itihāsa, Īsavī san ke pūrva pāncāvīṃ śatābdī se Īsavī san kī aṭhārahavīṃ śatābdī taka. 1985, 690 pp.
- History and Development of Prakrit Literature. 2004, 520 pp.
