= Palak Jain =

Palak Jain may refer to:

- Palak Jain (actress, active since 2003)
- Palak Jain (actress, active since 2019)
- Palak Jain (actress and model)
