= Varroc =

Indian automotive component manufacturer

Varroc Group
- Type: Public
- Traded as: NSE: VARROC; BSE: 541578
- Industry: Automotive components
- Founded: 1990
- Founder: Tarang Jain
- Headquarters: Aurangabad, Maharashtra
- Owner: Tarang Jain family (75%)
- Website: varroc.com

Varroc is an Indian multinational automotive component manufacturer and supplier of exterior lighting systems, powertrains, electrical and electronics, body and chassis parts to passenger car and motorcycle segments. The company was founded by Tarang Jain in 1990 and is currently headquartered at Aurangabad in Maharashtra, with 35 manufacturing facilities and 11 engineering centres in 10 countries across three continents.

== History ==
Varroc was established by Tarang Jain in 1990, in Aurangabad, India with the commencement of the company's polymer division. Between 1992 and 1998, the company focused on product diversification and capacity expansion and started its electrical and metallic division. Varroc started more polymer manufacturing facilities in 1997 in Pune and Aurangabad.

In 2001, Varroc expanded its development capabilities by collaborating with Mitsuba Corporation, a Japanese manufacturer of automobile parts. The company collaborated with Brussels based materials technology company, Umicore, in 2005 and started production of automotive catalytic converter.

Between 2007 and 2010, Varroc acquired IMES, Poland and Italy to strengthen forging business in European markets, off-road and oil drilling industry. The company also invested in manufacturing capability for polymers in National Capital Region to cater to OEMs in North India.

In 2011, Varroc acquired European two wheelers lighting organization Tri.O.M. S.p.A. including its R&D center. In 2012, Varroc's turnover crossed the US$1 billion mark with the acquisition of Visteon's Lighting Business along with its two R&D centers.

Varroc established its eighth polymer plant in Pithampur, Indore, in 2012, which caters to Volvo, Eicher and Mahindra Two Wheelers. Another polymer plant was established in Bengaluru that caters to HMSI and passenger car segment. The company also invested in design and set up of the 10th polymer plant at Chennai to supply Yamaha Motor Company.

In 2015, Varroc partnered with UK Based manufacturer and supplier Scorpion Automotive Ltd to provide security-based products for two-wheelers.

== Operations ==
The company has five business verticals under its umbrella:

=== Varroc Lighting Systems ===
Varroc Lighting Systems (VLS), headquartered out of Plymouth, Michigan, is a supplier of exterior lighting for passenger cars and commercial vehicles. The division has six manufacturing plants across North American, European, and Asian countries and six Engineering centers in the Czech Republic, France, China, Germany, Poland, Mexico, Romania and India.

=== Triom Lighting ===
Triom Two-Wheeler Lighting, the lighting system arm of Varroc for the two-wheeler industry, develops electronics and lighting solutions for the automotive market in India and Europe. The division produces high quality two-wheeler lighting systems. It has four manufacturing plants – two in Europe, one in Vietnam, and one in Mexico – as well as an engineering center in Italy.

=== Electrical ===
Varroc's Electrical division offers complete solutions in electrical components and assemblies for the two, three, four wheeler, off-road as well as commercial vehicles segments. The division has five manufacturing facilities located in the states of Maharashtra and Uttarakhand. Tier 1 auto component manufacturer which supplies to leading OEMs both in India and overseas, has clarified its position on the patent violation allegations levelled by Flash Electronics India against Royal Enfield in the US regarding production of a key component for two-wheelers/motorcycles.

=== Polymer ===
Varroc polymer provides solutions to the automotive segments. The division produces a wide range of injection and compression moulded automotive and allied rubber components. Varroc is the largest polymer solution provider to the two-wheeler industry in India.

== Awards and accolades ==
=== 2016 ===
- Emerging Manufacturing Giant citation honour by Devendra Fadnavis, Chief Minister of Maharashtra, India on behalf of Indian Merchants' Chamber.
- India Automotive Lighting Technology Innovation Leadership Award” at the Frost & Sullivan’s GIL 2016: India Awards.
- Environmental Youth of the Year award 2016 for implementing green initiatives from Clean & Green India jointly with SingEX, Singapore and Franchise India.
- Kaizen Award in Innovative Kaizen Category during 26th CII–TPM Club National Kaizen Conference Cum Competition held at New Delhi.

=== 2015 ===
- Best Supplier Award 2015 from Danfoss for best performance in quality and delivery to multiple Danfoss global locations & proactive planning for keeping commitments.
- New Product Development Award by HMSI.

=== 2013 ===
- Tarang Jain received Forbes Next Generation Entrepreneur award.
