= Fevicol =

Indian adhesive brand

- Logo of the adhesive brand Fevicol
- Product type: Adhesive, glue, sealant
- Current owner: Pidilite Industries
- Produced by: Pidilite Industries
- Country: India
- Introduced: 1959
- Related brands: FeviKwik, Dr. Fixit
- Markets: India, US, Brazil, Thailand, Egypt, Bangladesh, Dubai
- Registered as a trademark in: List: Bahrain; Cambodia; Egypt; Indonesia; India; Malaysia; Philippines; Singapore; Thailand; Tunisia; United States; Vietnam
- Website: fevicol.in

Fevicol is an Indian brand of adhesives owned by Pidilite Industries.

== History ==
First introduced in India in 1959, Fevicol was launched as a user-friendly alternative to traditional collagen and fat-based adhesives, known locally as "saresh", which required melting before application. The brand initially focused on providing adhesives for industrial applications and has since expanded its presence to 54 countries, with a significant market footprint in India.

== Product descriptions ==
Fevicol is marketed as a white adhesive, described in company literature as a poly-synthetic resin. It is manufactured through the synthesis of formaldehyde and urea.

The product line includes various formulations designed for specific qualities such as bonding strength, impact resistance, curing time, sag resistance, shrinkage, versatility, fire resistance, shock and vibration resistance, and non-staining properties.

Variants like "Fevicol SH" are synthetic resin adhesives primarily used in wood working and applications where at least one surface is porous. It is commonly used for bonding wood, plywood, laminate, veneers, MDF, cork, and in the manufacturing of sporting goods and bookbinding. SH typically achieves handling strength within 8 to 10 hours, with full curing in 24 hours. The "Fevicol MR" variant is meant for home and office use, and in art and crafts.

Fevicol Design Ideas, initiated in 1991 as the Fevicol Furniture Book, serves as a platform to showcase furniture design concepts. The series comprises 31 volumes and has expanded to an online resource where users can access design ideas and connect with contractors and interior designers.

== In popular culture ==
Fevicol is recognized as a generic term for white glue among consumers in India.

Prominent catchphrases from Fevicol TV advertisements include "Dum Laga Kar haisya, zor laga kar haisya" and "Fevicol ka mazboot jodh hai, tootega nahi".

The song "Fevicol Se", featured in the 2012 film Dabangg 2, uses the brand’s adhesive properties as a metaphor. The lyrics goes "Mere photo ko seene se yaar, chipka le saiyan Fevicol se", roughly translating to "stick my photo against your heart using Fevicol".

== See also ==
- List of generic and genericized trademarks
