= Pidilite Industries =

Indian multinational adhesives manufacturing company

Pidilite Industries Limited
- Type: Public
- Traded as: BSE: 500331; NSE: PIDILITIND
- ISIN: INE318A01026
- Industry: Chemical industry
- Founded: 1969; 57 years ago in Jacob Circle, Mumbai
- Founder: Balvantray Kalyanji Parekh
- Headquarters: Andheri, Mumbai, India
- Area served: Worldwide
- Key people: Madhukar Parekh (Chairman); Apurva N. Parekh (Vice Chairman); Sudhanshu Vats (Managing Director); Kavinder Singh (Joint Managing Director)
- Products: Adhesives, sealants, construction chemicals, waterproofing chemicals, paint chemicals, pigments, arts and crafts materials, industrial chemicals
- Brands: Fevicol, Fevikwik, M-Seal, Dr. Fixit, Fevicryl, Fevistik, Roff
- Revenue: ▲₹14,867.01 crore (US$1.5 billion) (2026)
- Operating income: ▲₹3,354.30 crore (US$350 million) (2026)
- Net income: ▲₹3,336.25 crore (US$350 million) (2026)
- Number of employees: 8,835 (2026)
- Subsidiaries: Selected subsidiaries: Fevicol Company Ltd.; Pidilite Ventures Pvt. Ltd.; ICA Pidilite Pvt. Ltd.; Pidilite Litokol Pvt. Ltd.; Tenax Pidilite India Pvt. Ltd.; Pidilite MEA Chemicals LLC; Pidilite International Pte. Ltd.; Pidilite Speciality Chemicals Bangladesh Pvt. Ltd.
- Website: www.pidilite.com
- Footnotes; Financial figures as of 31 March 2026.

Pidilite Industries Limited is an Indian adhesives manufacturing company based in Andheri (East), Mumbai. The company is the leading adhesives manufacturer in India. Pidilite also manufactures products in verticals such as art materials and stationery; food and fabric care; car products, adhesives, and sealants; and speciality industrial products like adhesives, pigments; textile resins, leather chemicals, and construction chemicals.

Pidilite markets the Fevicol range of adhesives. Its other brands are FeviKwik, FeviGum, Fevicryl, Dr. Fixit, D-klog, Roff, Cyclo, Ranipal, Hobby Ideas, M-seal, and Acron. Pidilite has launched Dr.Fixit Heatshield, a heat-reducing exterior coating that is developed by R&D team in India & Singapore.

The company has manufacturing facilities across India including in Mahad (Maharashtra), Vapi (Gujarat), Baddi and Kala Amb (both in Himachal Pradesh).

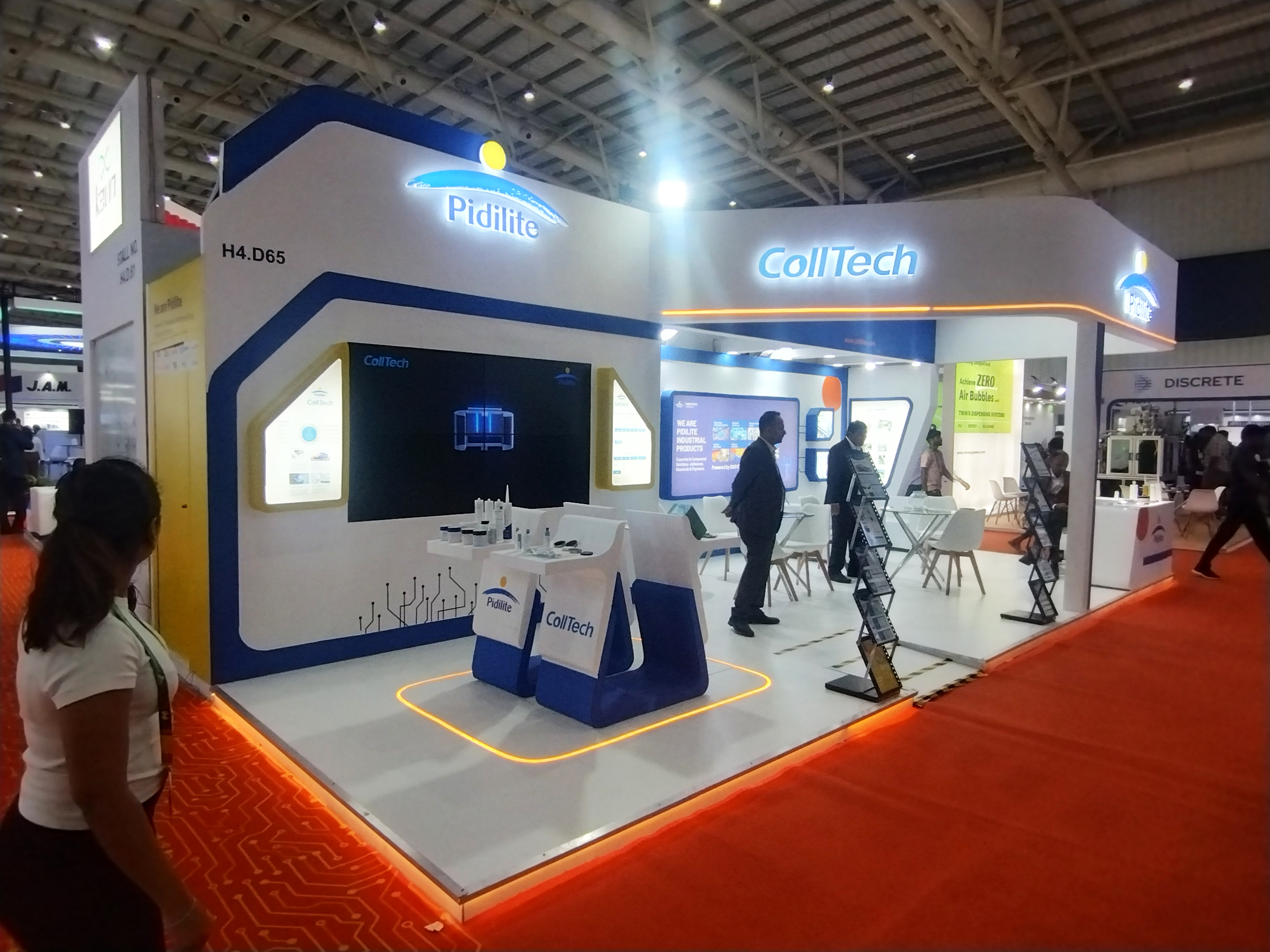
Pidilite and its collab partner CollTech Shenzen, at Electronica 2025, BIEC

== History ==
The company was founded in 1959.

In 2015, Pidilite acquired a 70% majority stake in Nina Waterproofing Systems for ₹100 crore (US$15.59 million).

In 2016, Pidilite formed a joint venture with Industria Chimica Adriatica Spa (ICA), an Italian company. The joint venture is named ICA Pidilite.

In 2018, Pidilite acquired a 70% stake in CIPY Polyurethanes for ₹96 crore (US$14.04 million).

In 2020, Pidilite acquired Huntsman Corporation's Indian subsidiary for ₹2,100 crore (US$283.4 million) to strengthen their retail adhesives and sealants portfolio.

In 2022, Pidilite Industries partnered with 100x.VC.

In 2023, Pidilite Industries formed two joint ventures: Pidilite Litokol with Litokol, an Italian company, and Tenax Pidilite with Tenax, also an Italian company. As part of the joint venture agreements, both Litokol and Tenax transferred technology to Pidilite. In 2024, ICA Pidilite signed an agreement to license certain ultraviolet technologies from ICA.
